= Tamel =

Tamel may refer to:

- Tamel (Santa Leocádia), a parish in the municipality of Barcelos, Portugal
- Tamel (São Pedro Fins), a parish in the municipality of Barcelos, Portugal
- Tamel (São Veríssimo), a parish in the municipality of Barcelos, Portugal

== See also ==
- Tamil
