= Vila Cova =

Vila Cova may refer to several locations in Portugal:

- Vila Cova (Barcelos), a parish in the municipality of Barcelos
- Vila Cova (Fafe), a parish in the municipality of Fafe
- Vila Cova (Penafiel), a parish in the municipality of Penafiel
- Vila Cova (Vila Real), a parish in the municipality of Vila Real
- Vila Cova à Coelheira (Seia), a parish in the municipality of Seia
- Vila Cova à Coelheira (Vila Nova de Paiva), a parish in the municipality of Vila Nova de Paiva
