= Fornelos =

Fornelos may refer to:

== Places ==
=== Portugal ===
- Fornelos (Barcelos), a civil parish in the municipality of Barcelos
- Fornelos (Cinfães), a civil parish in the municipality of Cinfães
- Fornelos (Fafe), a civil parish in the municipality of Fafe
- Fornelos (Ponte de Lima), a civil parish in the municipality of Ponte de Lima
- Fornelos (Santa Marta de Penaguião), a civil parish in the municipality of Santa Marta de Penaguião
