= Negreiros e Chavão =

- Civil parish
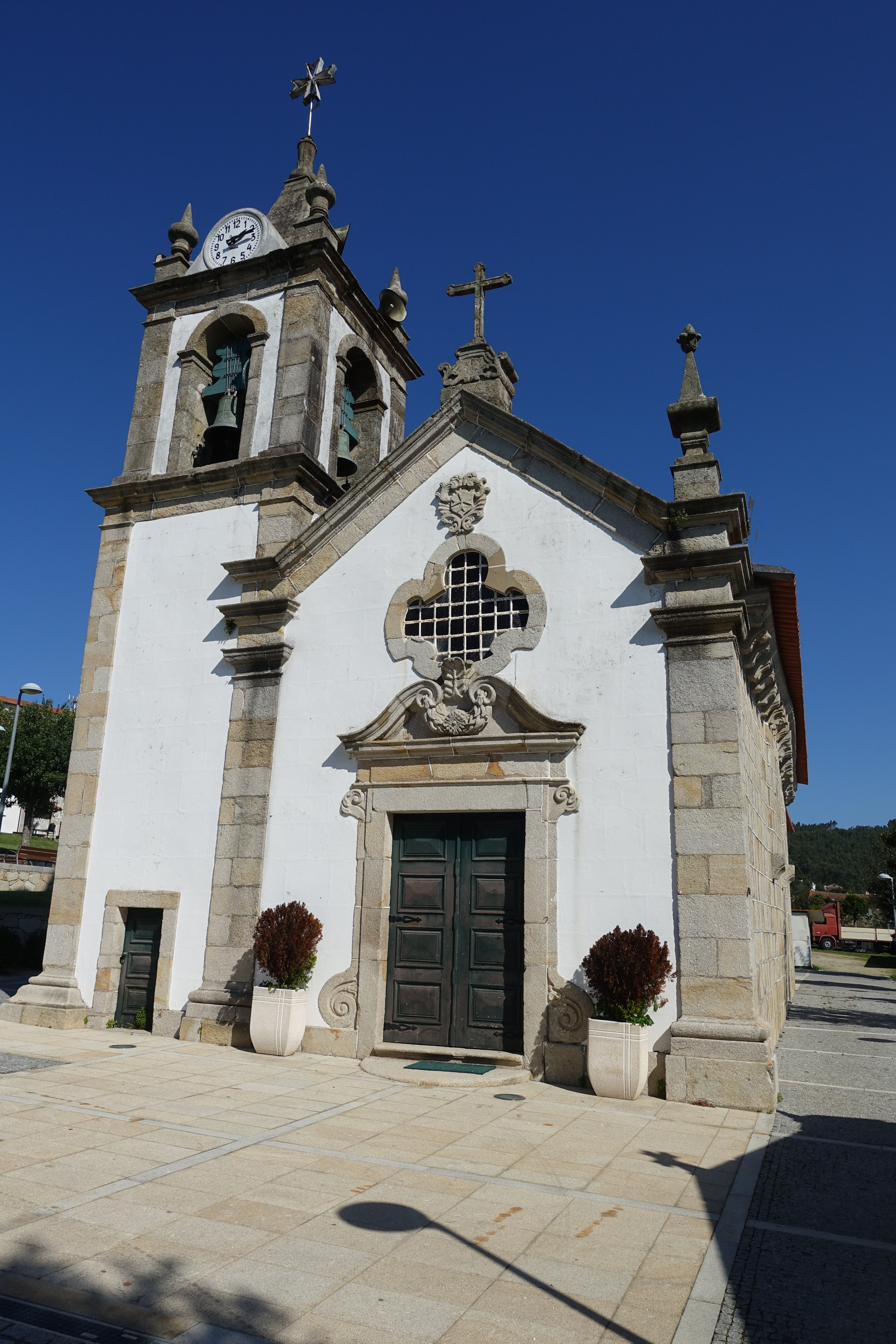
- Church of Chavão

- Location in Portugal
- Coordinates: 41.431°N 8.617°W
- Country: Portugal
- Region: Norte
- Intermunic. comm.: Cávado
- District: Braga
- Municipality: Barcelos

Area
  - Total: 6.96 km^{2} (2.69 sq mi)

Population (2011)
  - Total: 2,364
  - Density: 340/km^{2} (880/sq mi)
- Time zone: UTC+00:00 (WET)
  - Summer (DST): UTC+01:00 (WEST)

Negreiros e Chavão is a civil parish in the municipality of Barcelos, Portugal. It was formed in 2013 by the merger of the former parishes Negreiros and Chavão. The population in 2011 was 2,364, in an area of 6.96 km^{2} (2.69 sq mi). The main monument of Chavão is the parish church, of Baroque style with a few Romanesque elements.
