= Aborim =

- Civil parish
- Location in Portugal
- Coordinates: 41.608°N 8.634°W
- Country: Portugal
- Region: Norte
- Intermunic. comm.: Cávado
- District: Braga
- Municipality: Barcelos

Area
  - Total: 6.18 km^{2} (2.39 sq mi)

Population (2011)
  - Total: 891
  - Density: 140/km^{2} (370/sq mi)
- Time zone: UTC+00:00 (WET)
  - Summer (DST): UTC+01:00 (WEST)
- Website: https://web.archive.org/web/20091008120913/http://www.aborim.com/

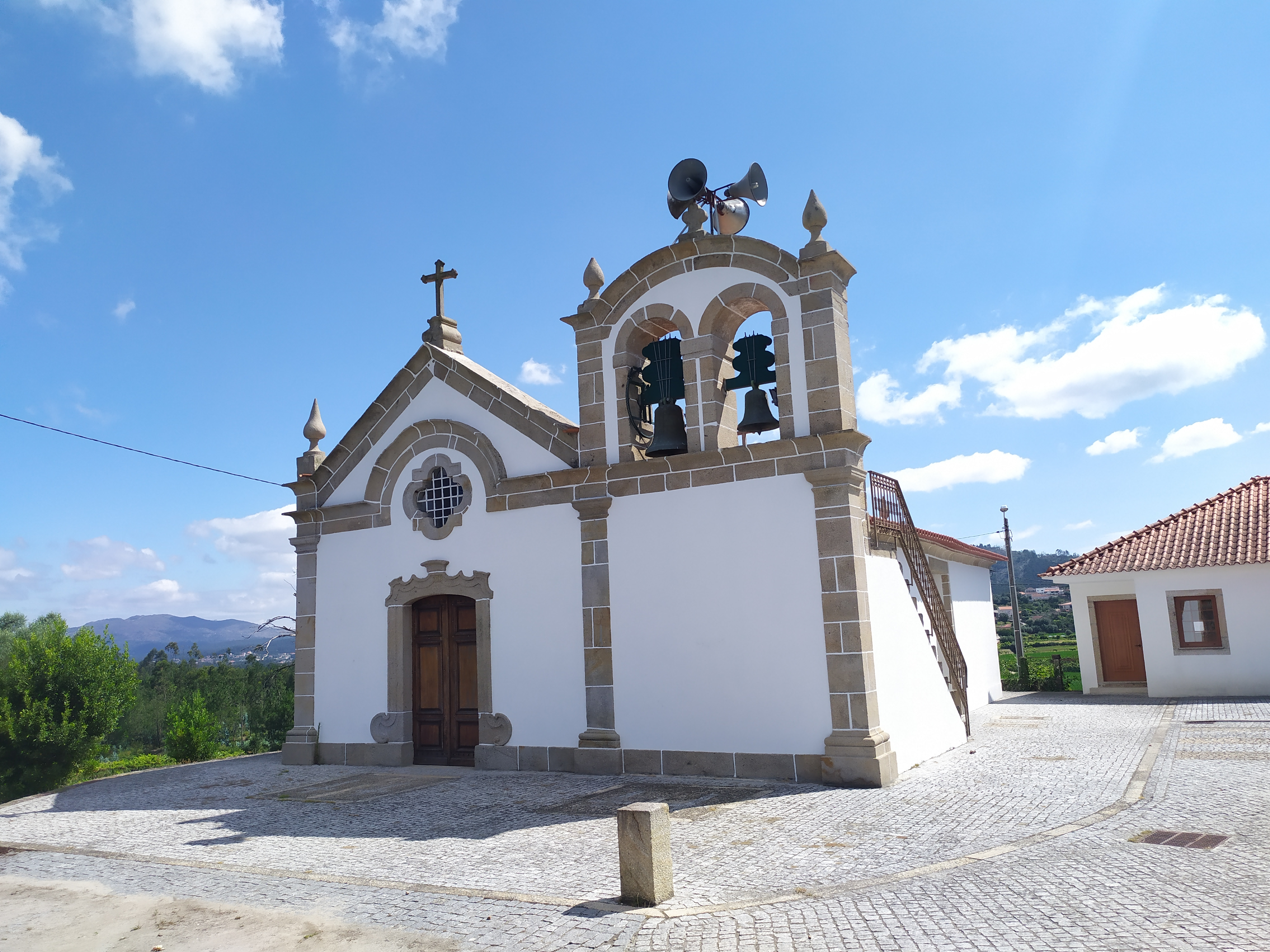
Aborim

Aborim is a Portuguese freguesia ("civil parish"), located in the municipality of Barcelos. The population in 2011 was 891, in an area of 6.18 km^{2}.
