= Macieira de Rates =

Parish in the municipality of Barcelos, Portugal

- Civil parish
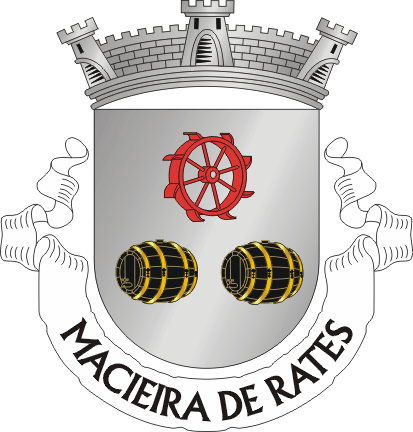
- Coat of arms

- Location in Portugal
- Coordinates: 41.436°N 8.633°W
- Country: Portugal
- Region: Norte
- Intermunic. comm.: Cávado
- District: Braga
- Municipality: Barcelos

Area
  - Total: 7.85 km^{2} (3.03 sq mi)

Population (2011)
  - Total: 2,083
  - Density: 270/km^{2} (690/sq mi)
- Time zone: UTC+00:00 (WET)
  - Summer (DST): UTC+01:00 (WEST)

Macieira de Rates is a Portuguese parish, located in the municipality of Barcelos. The population in 2011 was 2,083, in an area of 7.85 km^{2}.
