= Ucha, Portugal =

Ucha
- Civil parish
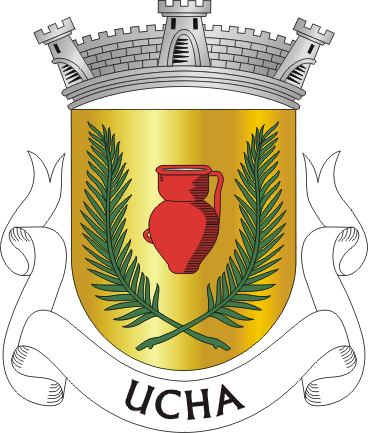
- Coat of arms

- Location in Portugal
- Coordinates: 41.576°N 8.518°W
- Country: Portugal
- Region: Norte
- Intermunic. comm.: Cávado
- District: Braga
- Municipality: Barcelos

Area
  - Total: 4.27 km^{2} (1.65 sq mi)

Population (2011)
  - Total: 1,420
  - Density: 333/km^{2} (861/sq mi)
- Time zone: UTC+00:00 (WET)
  - Summer (DST): UTC+01:00 (WEST)

Ucha is a Portuguese parish, located in the municipality of Barcelos. The population in 2011 was 1,420, in an area of 4.27 km^{2} (1.65 sq mi).
