= Lijó =

- Civil parish
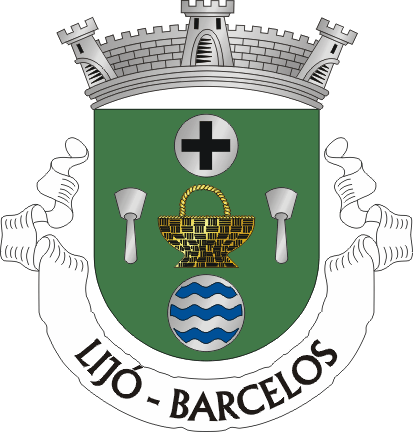
- Coat of arms

- Location in Portugal
- Coordinates: 41.569°N 8.615°W
- Country: Portugal
- Region: Norte
- Intermunic. comm.: Cávado
- District: Braga
- Municipality: Barcelos

Area
  - Total: 4.42 km^{2} (1.71 sq mi)

Population (2011)
  - Total: 2,306
  - Density: 522/km^{2} (1,350/sq mi)
- Time zone: UTC+00:00 (WET)
  - Summer (DST): UTC+01:00 (WEST)

Lijó is a Portuguese freguesia ("civil parish"), located in the municipality of Barcelos. The population in 2011 was 2,306, in an area of 4.42 km^{2} (1.71 sq mi).
