= Areias (Barcelos) =

- Civil parish
- Location in Portugal
- Coordinates: 41.557°N 8.544°W
- Country: Portugal
- Region: Norte
- Intermunic. comm.: Cávado
- District: Braga
- Municipality: Barcelos

Area
  - Total: 2.51 km^{2} (0.97 sq mi)

Population (2011)
  - Total: 1,014
  - Density: 404/km^{2} (1,050/sq mi)
- Time zone: UTC+00:00 (WET)
  - Summer (DST): UTC+01:00 (WEST)

Areias, Barcelos, Portugal

Areias is a freguesia ("civil parish") in the municipality of Barcelos, Portugal. The population in 2011 was 1,014, in an area of 2.51 km^{2}.
