= Lama (Barcelos) =

- Civil parish
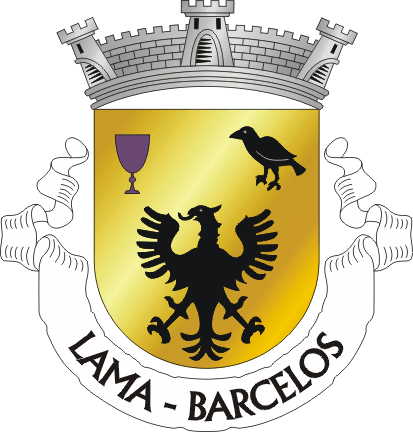
- Coat of arms

- Location in Portugal
- Coordinates: 41.567°N 8.533°W
- Country: Portugal
- Region: Norte
- Intermunic. comm.: Cávado
- District: Braga
- Municipality: Barcelos

Area
  - Total: 3.27 km^{2} (1.26 sq mi)

Population (2011)
  - Total: 1,271
  - Density: 389/km^{2} (1,010/sq mi)
- Time zone: UTC+00:00 (WET)
  - Summer (DST): UTC+01:00 (WEST)

Lama is a Portuguese freguesia ("civil parish"), located in the municipality of Barcelos. The population in 2011 was 1,271, in an area of 3.27 km^{2} (1.26 sq mi).
