= Abade de Neiva =

- Civil parish
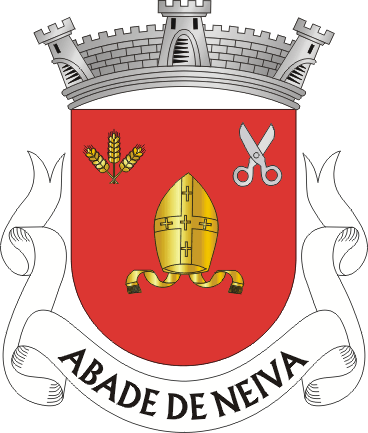
- Coat of arms

- Location in Portugal
- Coordinates: 41.555°N 8.637°W
- Country: Portugal
- Region: Norte
- Intermunic. comm.: Cávado
- District: Braga
- Municipality: Barcelos

Area
  - Total: 7.50 km^{2} (2.90 sq mi)

Population (2011)
  - Total: 2,024
  - Density: 270/km^{2} (699/sq mi)
- Time zone: UTC+00:00 (WET)
  - Summer (DST): UTC+01:00 (WEST)
- Website: http://www.abadedeneiva.maisbarcelos.pt/

Abade de Neiva is a Portuguese freguesia ("civil parish"), located in the municipality of Barcelos. The population in 2011 was 2,024, in an area of 7.50 km^{2} (2.90 sq mi).
