= Vila Seca (Barcelos) =

- Civil parish
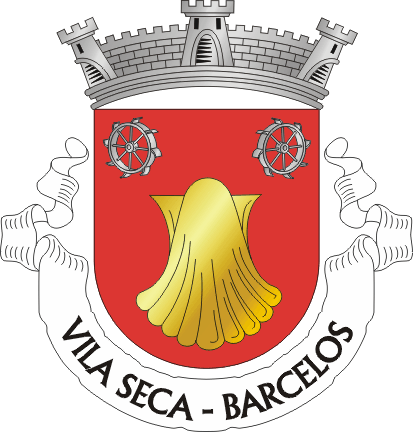
- Coat of arms

- Location in Portugal
- Coordinates: 41.501°N 8.686°W
- Country: Portugal
- Region: Norte
- Intermunic. comm.: Cávado
- District: Braga
- Municipality: Barcelos

Area
  - Total: 4.34 km^{2} (1.68 sq mi)

Population (2011)
  - Total: 1,197
  - Density: 280/km^{2} (710/sq mi)
- Time zone: UTC+00:00 (WET)
  - Summer (DST): UTC+01:00 (WEST)

Vila Seca is a Portuguese parish, located in the municipality of Barcelos. The population in 2011 was 1,197, in an area of 4.34 km^{2}.

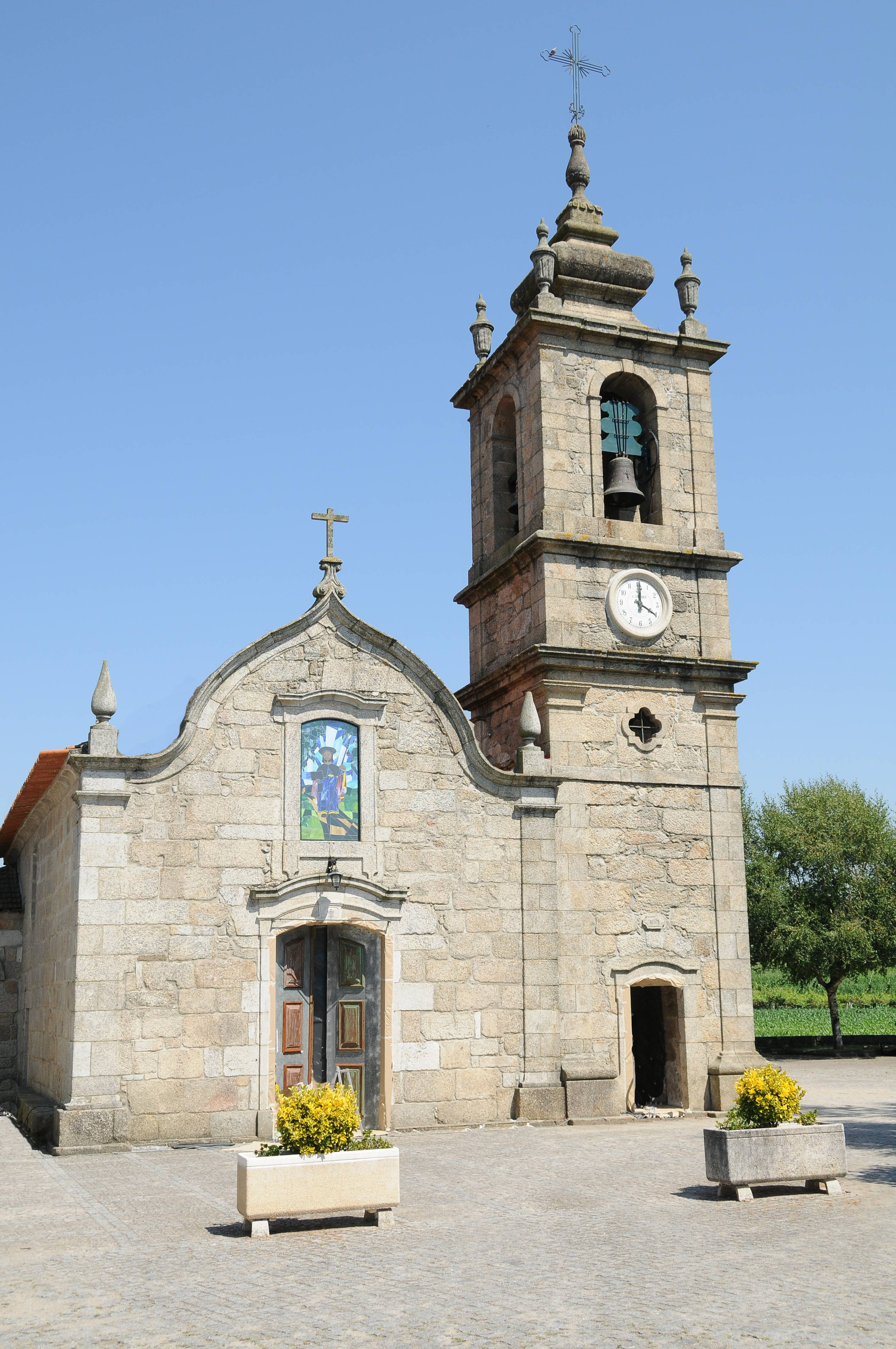
Vila Seca Church
