= Cristelo (Barcelos) =

- Civil parish
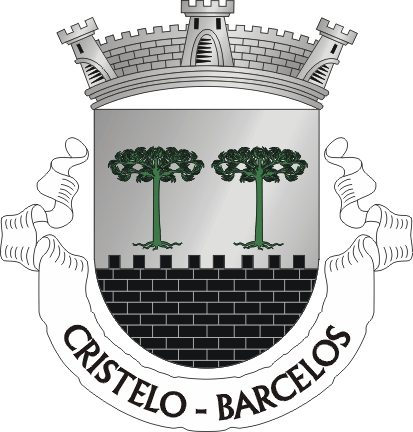
- Coat of arms

- Location in Portugal
- Coordinates: 41.479°N 8.697°W
- Country: Portugal
- Region: Norte
- Intermunic. comm.: Cávado
- District: Braga
- Municipality: Barcelos

Area
  - Total: 7.71 km^{2} (2.98 sq mi)

Population (2011)
  - Total: 1,875
  - Density: 243/km^{2} (630/sq mi)
- Time zone: UTC+00:00 (WET)
  - Summer (DST): UTC+01:00 (WEST)

Cristelo is a Portuguese freguesia ("civil parish"), located in the municipality of Barcelos. The population in 2011 was 1,875, in an area of 7.71 km^{2} (2.98 sq mi).

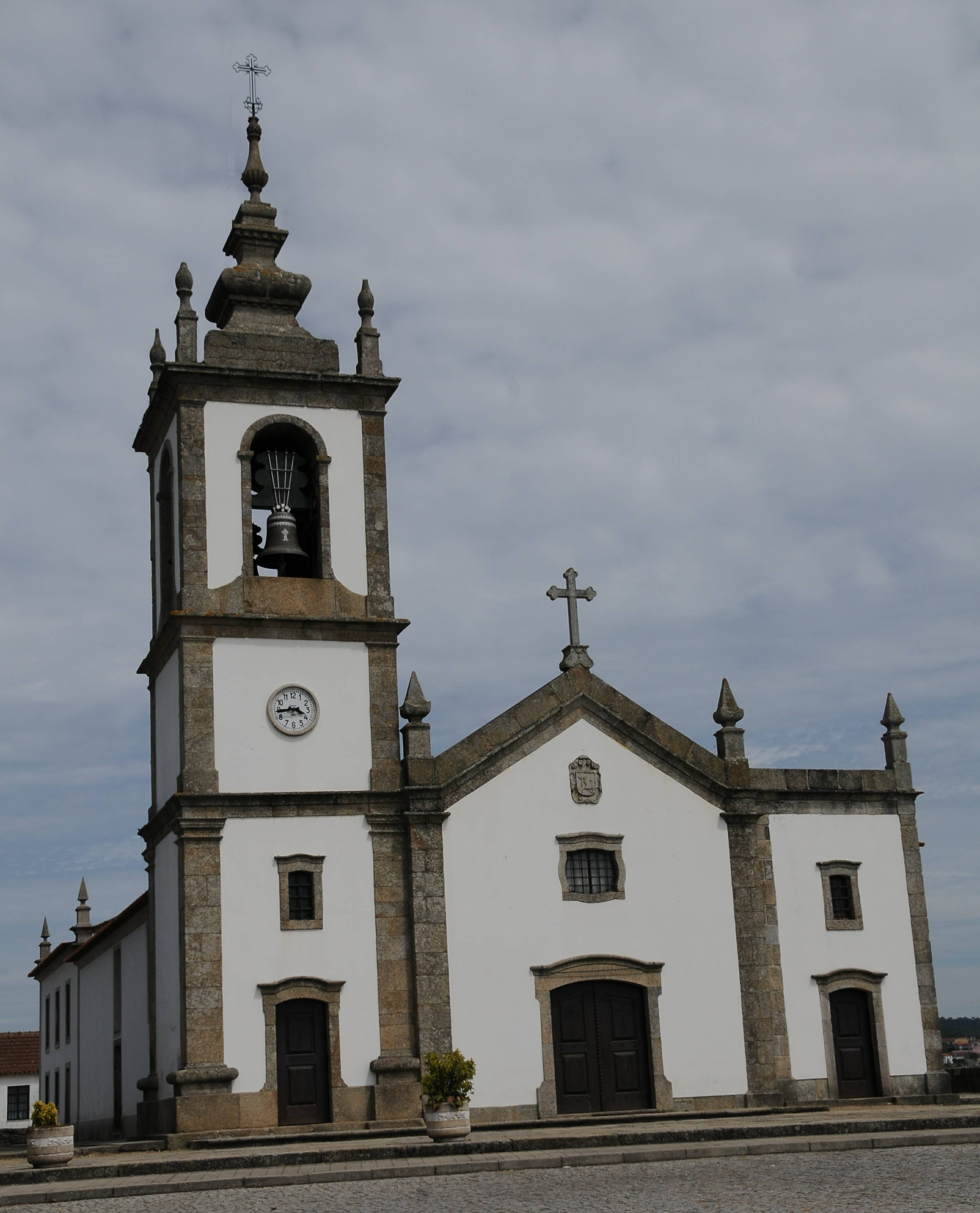
Cristelo Church
