= Oliveira (Barcelos) =

- Civil parish
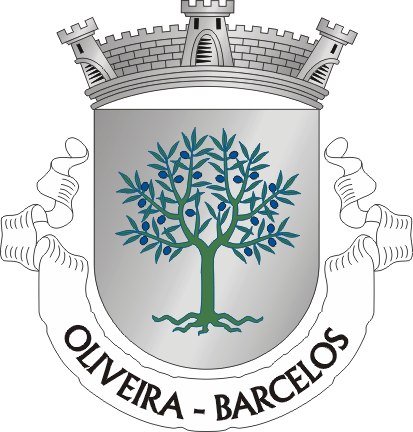
- Coat of arms

- Location in Portugal
- Coordinates: 41.584°N 8.544°W
- Country: Portugal
- Region: Norte
- Intermunic. comm.: Cávado
- District: Braga
- Municipality: Barcelos

Area
  - Total: 5.46 km^{2} (2.11 sq mi)

Population (2011)
  - Total: 1,004
  - Density: 184/km^{2} (476/sq mi)
- Time zone: UTC+00:00 (WET)
  - Summer (DST): UTC+01:00 (WEST)

Oliveira is a Portuguese parish, located in the municipality of Barcelos. The population in 2011 was 1,004, in an area of 5.46 km^{2} (2.11 sq mi).
