= Arcozelo =

Arcozelo may refer to the following places in Portugal:

- Arcozelo (Barcelos), a parish in the municipality of Barcelos
- Arcozelo (Gouveia), a parish in the municipality of Gouveia
- Arcozelo (Ponte de Lima), a parish in the municipality of Ponte de Lima
- Arcozelo (Vila Nova de Gaia), a parish in the municipality of Vila Nova de Gaia
- Arcozelo (Vila Verde), a parish in Vila Verde Municipality

== See also ==
- Arcozelos, a parish in the municipality of Moimenta da Beira
