= Pereira (Barcelos) =

- Civil parish
- Location in Portugal
- Coordinates: 41.495°N 8.630°W
- Country: Portugal
- Region: Norte
- Intermunic. comm.: Cávado
- District: Braga
- Municipality: Barcelos

Area
  - Total: 3.85 km^{2} (1.49 sq mi)

Population (2011)
  - Total: 1,318
  - Density: 340/km^{2} (890/sq mi)
- Time zone: UTC+00:00 (WET)
  - Summer (DST): UTC+01:00 (WEST)

Pereira is a Portuguese parish, located in the municipality of Barcelos. The population in 2011 was 1,318, in an area of 3.85 km^{2}.
