= Carapeços =

- Civil parish
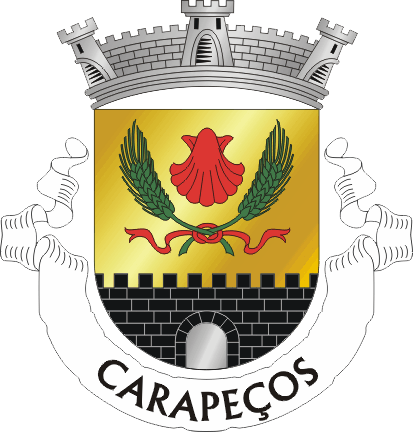
- Coat of arms

- Location in Portugal
- Coordinates: 41.584°N 8.633°W
- Country: Portugal
- Region: Norte
- Intermunic. comm.: Cávado
- District: Braga
- Municipality: Barcelos

Area
  - Total: 8.12 km^{2} (3.14 sq mi)

Population (2011)
  - Total: 2,277
  - Density: 280/km^{2} (730/sq mi)
- Time zone: UTC+00:00 (WET)
  - Summer (DST): UTC+01:00 (WEST)

Carapeços is a Portuguese freguesia ("civil parish"), located in the municipality of Barcelos. The population in 2011 was 2,277, in an area of 8.12 km^{2}.
