= Aldreu =

- Civil parish
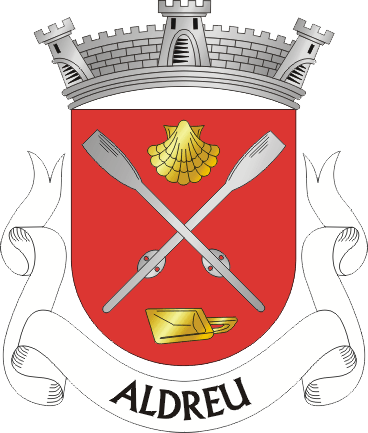
- Coat of arms

- Location in Portugal
- Coordinates: 41.609°N 8.717°W
- Country: Portugal
- Region: Norte
- Intermunic. comm.: Cávado
- District: Braga
- Municipality: Barcelos

Area
  - Total: 4.80 km^{2} (1.85 sq mi)

Population (2011)
  - Total: 904
  - Density: 188/km^{2} (488/sq mi)
- Time zone: UTC+00:00 (WET)
  - Summer (DST): UTC+01:00 (WEST)

Aldreu is a Portuguese freguesia ("civil parish"), located in the municipality of Barcelos. The population in 2011 was 904, in an area of 4.80 km^{2} (1.85 sq mi).
