= Roriz (Barcelos) =

- Civil parish
- Location in Portugal
- Coordinates: 41.587°N 8.589°W
- Country: Portugal
- Region: Norte
- Intermunic. comm.: Cávado
- District: Braga
- Municipality: Barcelos

Area
  - Total: 6.53 km^{2} (2.52 sq mi)

Population (2011)
  - Total: 2,152
  - Density: 330/km^{2} (850/sq mi)
- Time zone: UTC+00:00 (WET)
  - Summer (DST): UTC+01:00 (WEST)
- Website: https://roriz.pt/

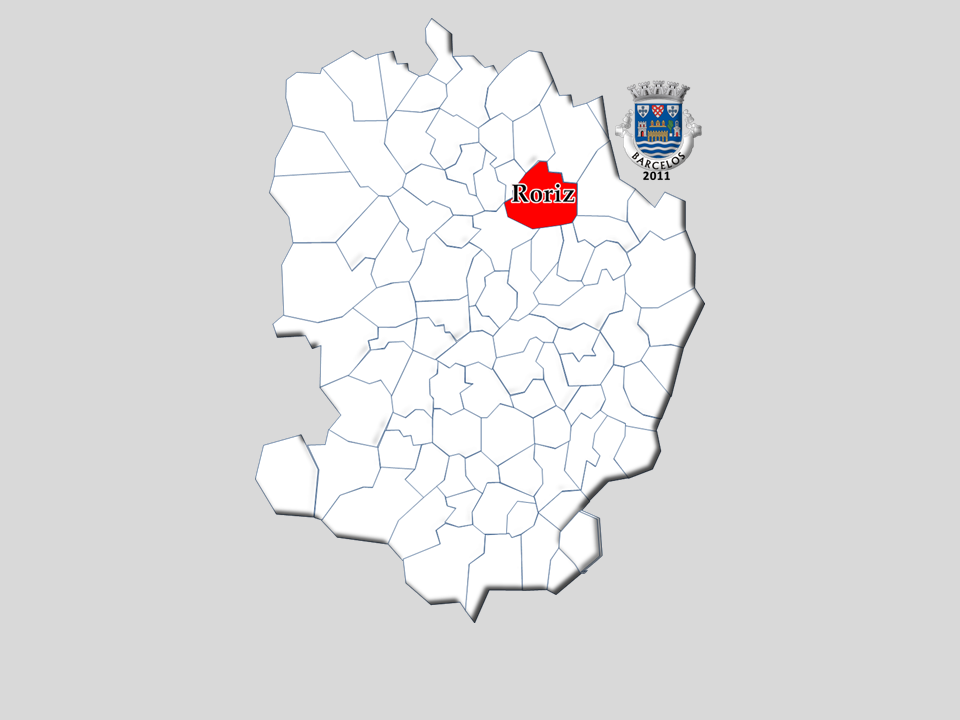
The location of Roriz within Barcelos parish

Roriz is a Portuguese freguesia ("civil parish"), located in the municipality of Barcelos in the district of Braga. The population in 2011 was 2,152, in an area of 6.53 km^{2}.

== History ==
The parish was first mentioned in a census organized by D. Pedro, bishop of Braga, between 1085 and 1091, where it was referenced as "De Sancto Micahel de Rooriz". There are subsequent mentions of this parish in the Royal Portuguese commissions of 1220 and 1258.

A richer historical depiction of the parish can be found in the Parochial Memories of 1758, which mention the importance of the agricultural practice as sustenance for its residents. The most abundant crops are reported to have been corn, millet, beans and rye, with a mention of winemaking.

As of 1841, the parish of Quiraz, which until then had been independent, was annexed to Roriz.
