= Gilmonde =

- Civil parish
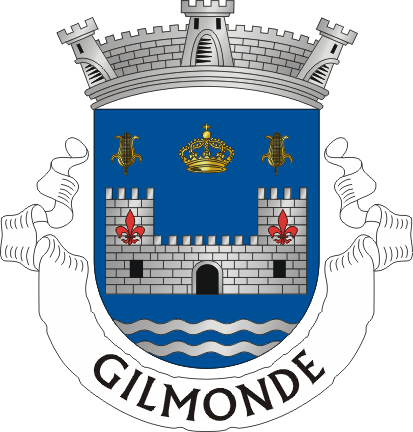
- Coat of arms

- Location in Portugal
- Coordinates: 41.510°N 8.657°W
- Country: Portugal
- Region: Norte
- Intermunic. comm.: Cávado
- District: Braga
- Municipality: Barcelos

Area
  - Total: 5.58 km^{2} (2.15 sq mi)

Population (2011)
  - Total: 1,516
  - Density: 272/km^{2} (704/sq mi)
- Time zone: UTC+00:00 (WET)
  - Summer (DST): UTC+01:00 (WEST)

Gilmonde is a Portuguese freguesia ("civil parish"), located in the municipality of Barcelos. The population in 2011 was 1,516, in an area of 5.58 km^{2} (2.15 sq mi).

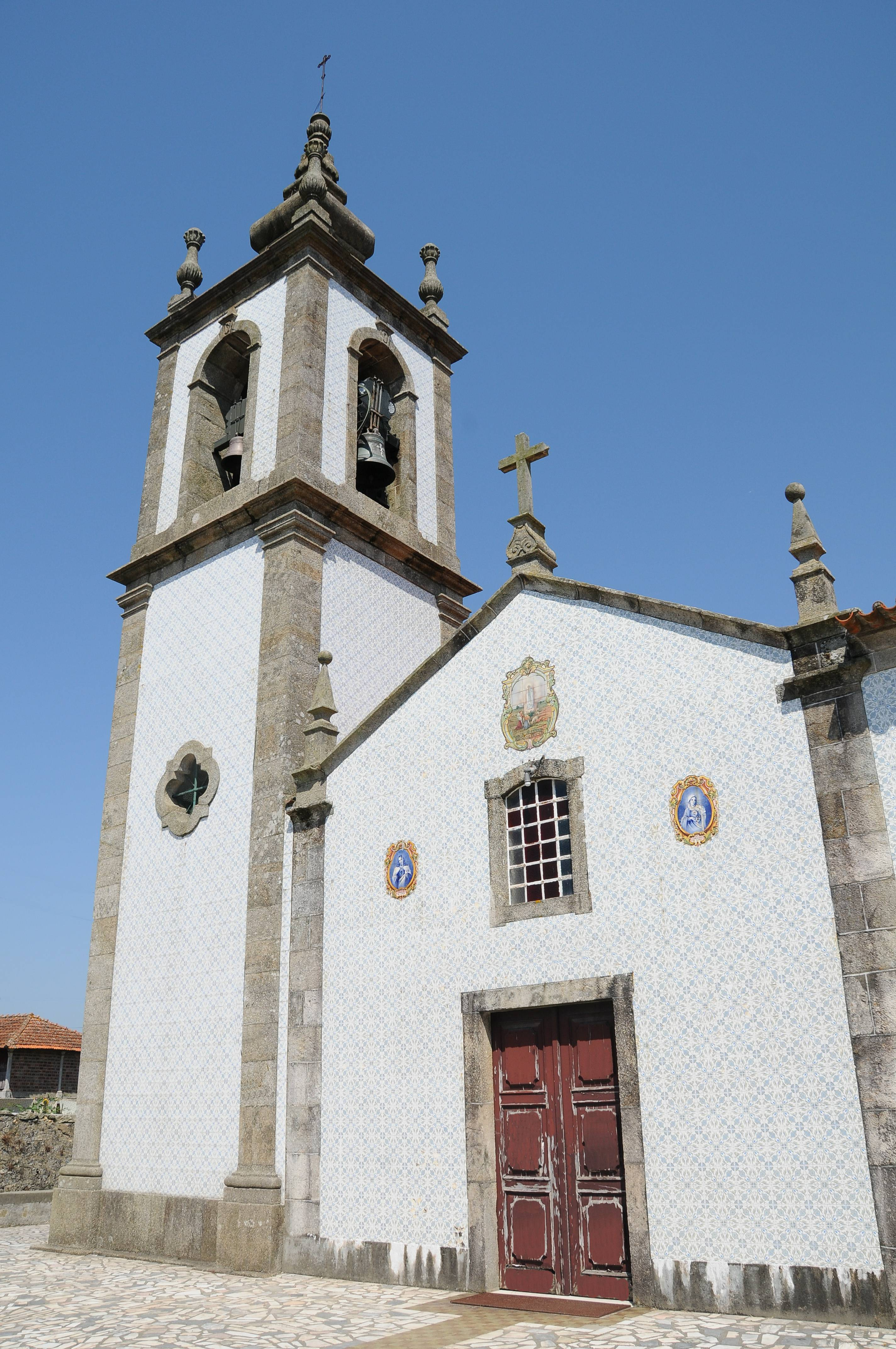
Gilmonde Church
