= Silva (Barcelos) =

- Civil parish
- Location in Portugal
- Coordinates: 41.568°N 8.629°W
- Country: Portugal
- Region: Norte
- Intermunic. comm.: Cávado
- District: Braga
- Municipality: Barcelos

Area
  - Total: 2.18 km^{2} (0.84 sq mi)

Population (2011)
  - Total: 913
  - Density: 419/km^{2} (1,080/sq mi)
- Time zone: UTC+00:00 (WET)
  - Summer (DST): UTC+01:00 (WEST)

Silva is a Portuguese freguesia ("civil parish"), located in the municipality of Barcelos. The population in 2011 was 913, in an area of 2.18 km^{2} (0.84 sq mi).
