= Moure (Barcelos) =

- Civil parish
- Location in Portugal
- Coordinates: 41.501°N 8.556°W
- Country: Portugal
- Region: Norte
- Intermunic. comm.: Cávado
- District: Braga
- Municipality: Barcelos

Area
  - Total: 2.54 km^{2} (0.98 sq mi)

Population (2011)
  - Total: 925
  - Density: 364/km^{2} (943/sq mi)
- Time zone: UTC+00:00 (WET)
  - Summer (DST): UTC+01:00 (WEST)

Moure is a Portuguese parish, located in the municipality of Barcelos. The population in 2011 was 925, in an area of 2.54 km^{2}.

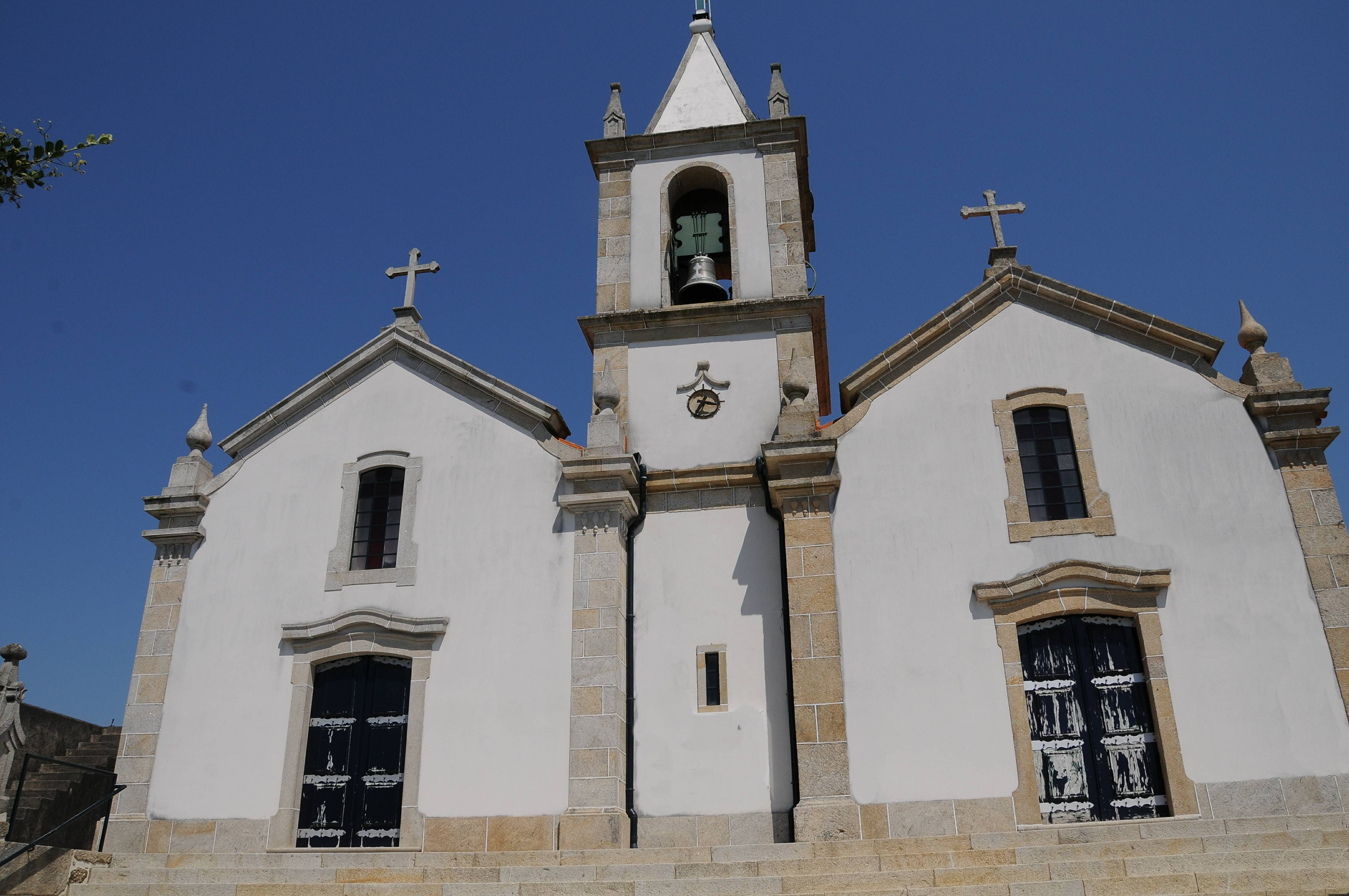
Moure Church
