= Fragoso =

- Civil parish
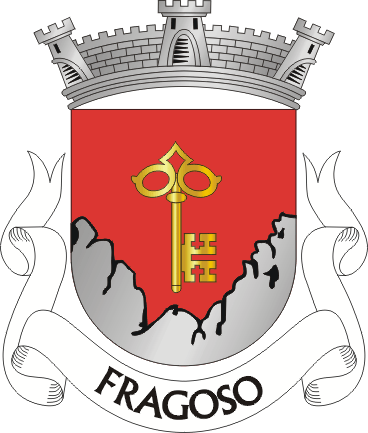
- Coat of arms

- Location in Portugal
- Coordinates: 41.615°N 8.704°W
- Country: Portugal
- Region: Norte
- Intermunic. comm.: Cávado
- District: Braga
- Municipality: Barcelos

Area
  - Total: 12.59 km^{2} (4.86 sq mi)

Population (2011)
  - Total: 2,193
  - Density: 170/km^{2} (450/sq mi)
- Time zone: UTC+00:00 (WET)
  - Summer (DST): UTC+01:00 (WEST)
- Website: http://www.fragoso.maisbarcelos.pt/

Fragoso is a Portuguese freguesia ("civil parish"), located in the concelho ("municipality") of Barcelos. The population in 2011 was 2,193, in an area of 12.59 km^{2}.

Its name is derived from the word fragoso, meaning "rocky" or "uneven". It is derived from the word fraga, meaning "cliff". Its Orago, or Patron Saint, is St. Peter the Apostle. The Count of Fragoso was a retainer of the Bishop of Braga.
