= Barcelinhos =

- Civil parish
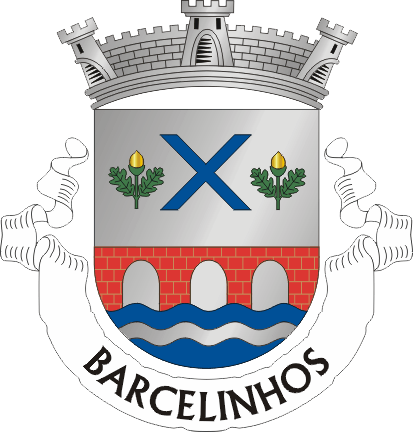
- Coat of arms

- Location in Portugal
- Coordinates: 41.524°N 8.627°W
- Country: Portugal
- Region: Norte
- Intermunic. comm.: Cávado
- District: Braga
- Municipality: Barcelos

Area
  - Total: 2.76 km^{2} (1.07 sq mi)

Population (2011)
  - Total: 1,781
  - Density: 645/km^{2} (1,670/sq mi)
- Time zone: UTC+00:00 (WET)
  - Summer (DST): UTC+01:00 (WEST)
- Website: http://www.barcelinhos.maisbarcelos.pt/

Barcelinhos is a Portuguese freguesia ("civil parish"), located in the municipality of Barcelos. The population in 2011 was 1,781, in an area of 2.76 km^{2} (1.07 sq mi).

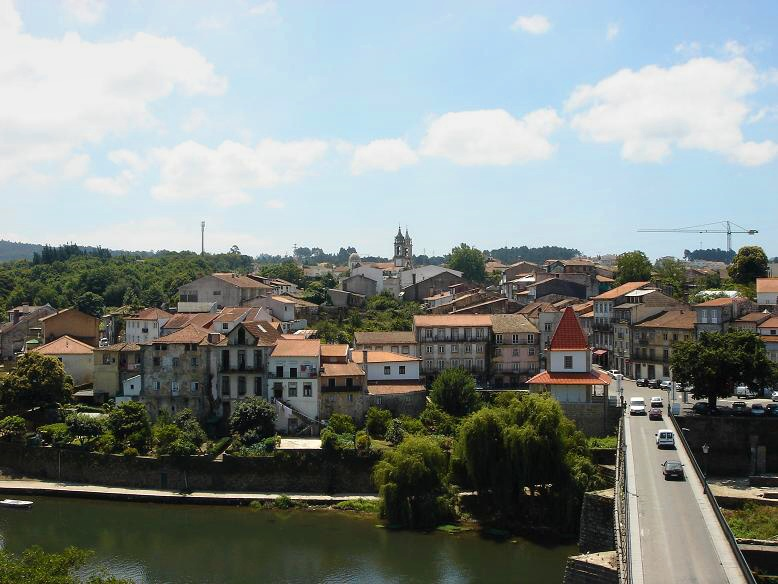
Barcelinhos as seen from Barcelos
