= Panque =

- Civil parish
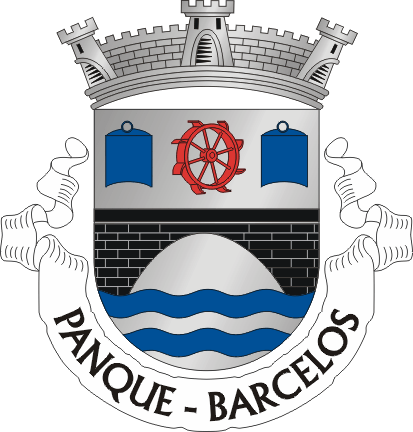
- Coat of arms

- Location in Portugal
- Coordinates: 41.635°N 8.595°W
- Country: Portugal
- Region: Norte
- Intermunic. comm.: Cávado
- District: Braga
- Municipality: Barcelos

Area
  - Total: 6.29 km^{2} (2.43 sq mi)

Population (2011)
  - Total: 680
  - Density: 110/km^{2} (280/sq mi)
- Time zone: UTC+00:00 (WET)
  - Summer (DST): UTC+01:00 (WEST)

Panque is a Portuguese freguesia ("civil parish"), located in the municipality of Barcelos. The population in 2011 was 680, in an area of 6.29 km^{2} (2.43 sq mi).
