= Palme (Barcelos) =

- Civil parish
- Location in Portugal
- Coordinates: 41.585°N 8.718°W
- Country: Portugal
- Region: Norte
- Intermunic. comm.: Cávado
- District: Braga
- Municipality: Barcelos

Area
  - Total: 8.31 km^{2} (3.21 sq mi)

Population (2011)
  - Total: 1,073
  - Density: 129/km^{2} (334/sq mi)
- Time zone: UTC+00:00 (WET)
  - Summer (DST): UTC+01:00 (WEST)

Palme is a Portuguese freguesia ("civil parish"), located in the municipality of Barcelos. The population in 2011 was 1,073, in an area of 8.31 km^{2} (3.21 sq mi).
