= Cossourado =

- Civil parish
- Location in Portugal
- Coordinates: 41.633°N 8.619°W
- Country: Portugal
- Region: Norte
- Intermunic. comm.: Cávado
- District: Braga
- Municipality: Barcelos

Area
  - Total: 6.44 km^{2} (2.49 sq mi)

Population (2011)
  - Total: 825
  - Density: 128/km^{2} (332/sq mi)
- Time zone: UTC+00:00 (WET)
  - Summer (DST): UTC+01:00 (WEST)
- Website: http://www.cossourado.com

Cossourado is a Portuguese freguesia ("civil parish"), located in the municipality of Barcelos. The population in 2011 was 825, in an area of 6.44 km^{2} (2.49 sq mi).
