= Airó =

- Civil parish
- Location in Portugal
- Coordinates: 41.516°N 8.563°W
- Country: Portugal
- Region: Norte
- Intermunic. comm.: Cávado
- District: Braga
- Municipality: Barcelos

Area
  - Total: 3.02 km^{2} (1.17 sq mi)

Population (2011)
  - Total: 913
  - Density: 302/km^{2} (783/sq mi)
- Time zone: UTC+00:00 (WET)
  - Summer (DST): UTC+01:00 (WEST)

Airó is a Portuguese freguesia ("civil parish"), located in the municipality of Barcelos. The population in 2011 was 913, in an area of 3.02 km^{2}.
