= Milhazes, Vilar de Figos e Faria =

- Civil parish
- Location in Portugal
- Coordinates: 41.491°N 8.661°W
- Country: Portugal
- Region: Norte
- Intermunic. comm.: Cávado
- District: Braga
- Municipality: Barcelos

Area
  - Total: 12.14 km^{2} (4.69 sq mi)

Population (2011)
  - Total: 2,066
  - Density: 170/km^{2} (440/sq mi)
- Time zone: UTC+00:00 (WET)
  - Summer (DST): UTC+01:00 (WEST)

Milhazes, Vilar de Figos e Faria is a civil parish in the municipality of Barcelos, Portugal. It was formed in 2013 by the merger of the former parishes Milhazes, Vilar de Figos and Faria. The population in 2011 was 2,066, in an area of 12.14 km^{2}.

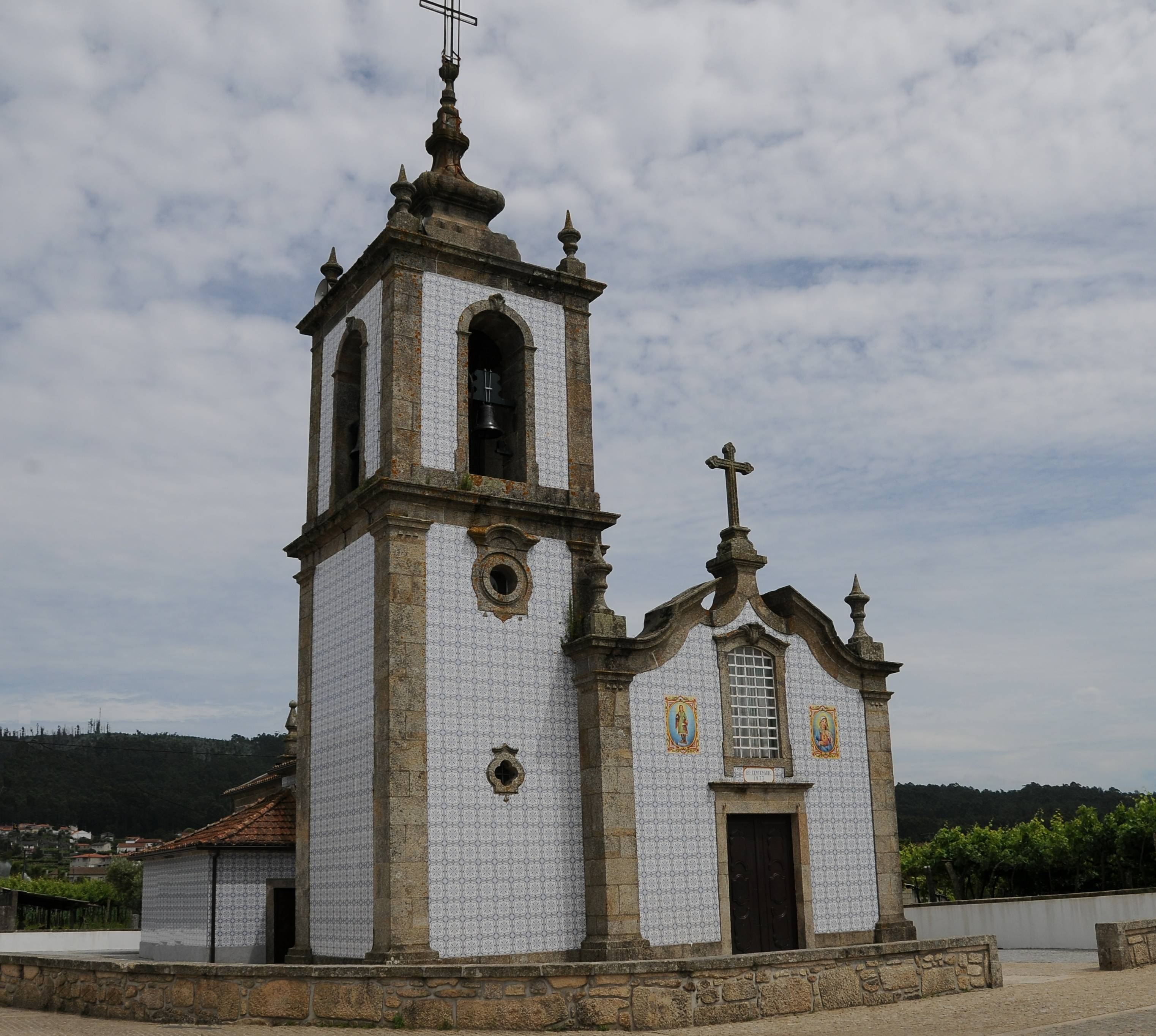
Milhazes Church

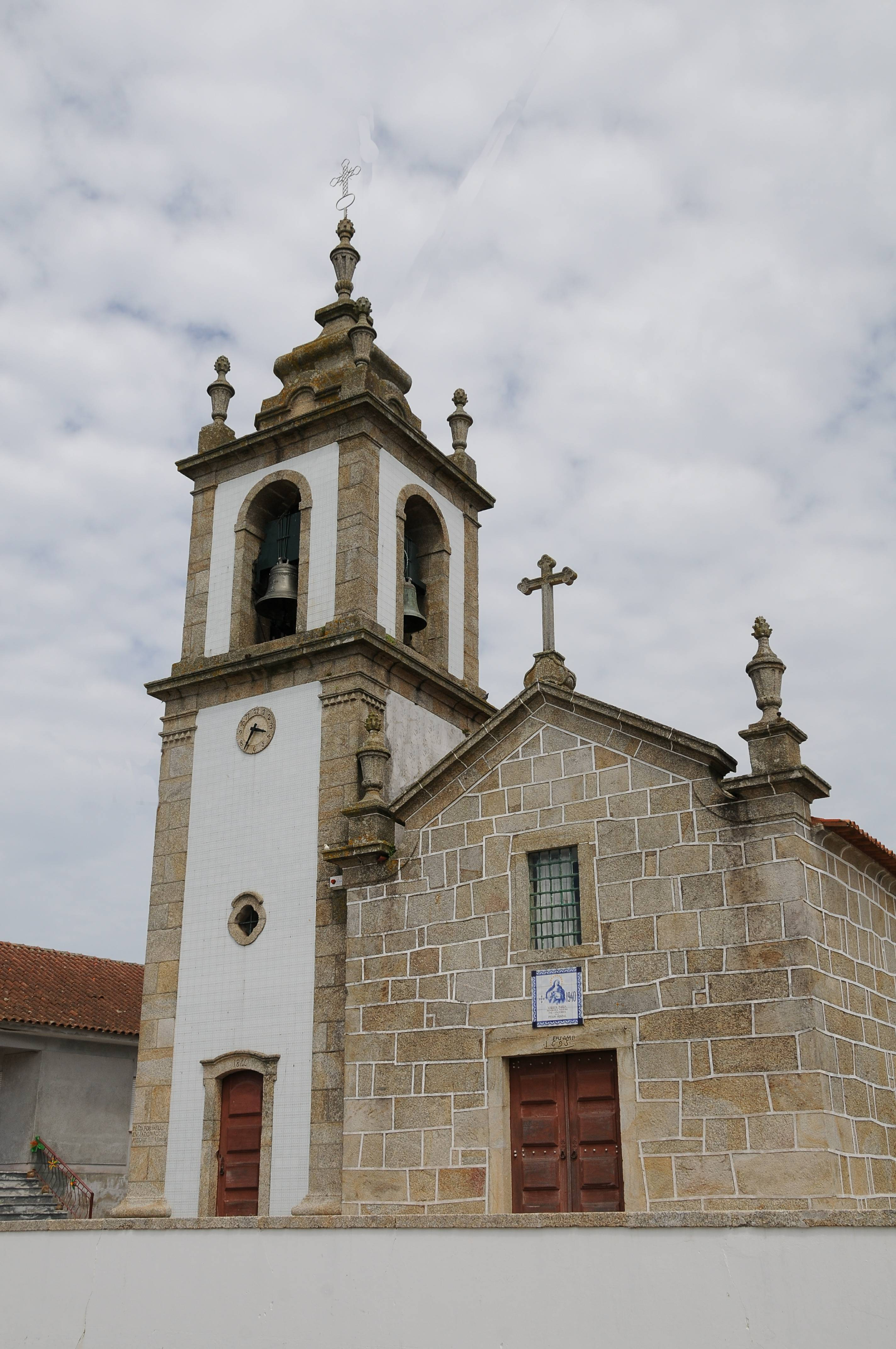
Faria Church
