= Tamel (São Veríssimo) =

- Civil parish
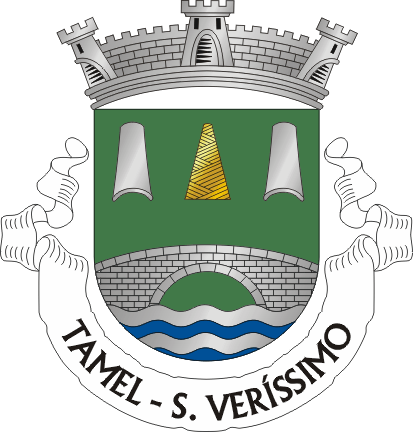
- Coat of arms

- Location in Portugal
- Coordinates: 41.577°N 8.651°W
- Country: Portugal
- Region: Norte
- Intermunic. comm.: Cávado
- District: Braga
- Municipality: Barcelos

Area
  - Total: 3.33 km^{2} (1.29 sq mi)

Population (2011)
  - Total: 3,025
  - Density: 910/km^{2} (2,400/sq mi)
- Time zone: UTC+00:00 (WET)
  - Summer (DST): UTC+01:00 (WEST)

Tamel (São Veríssimo) is a Portuguese parish, located in the municipality of Barcelos. The population in 2011 was 3,025, in an area of 3.33 km^{2}.
