= Renata Gomes =

Portuguese cardiovascular specialist

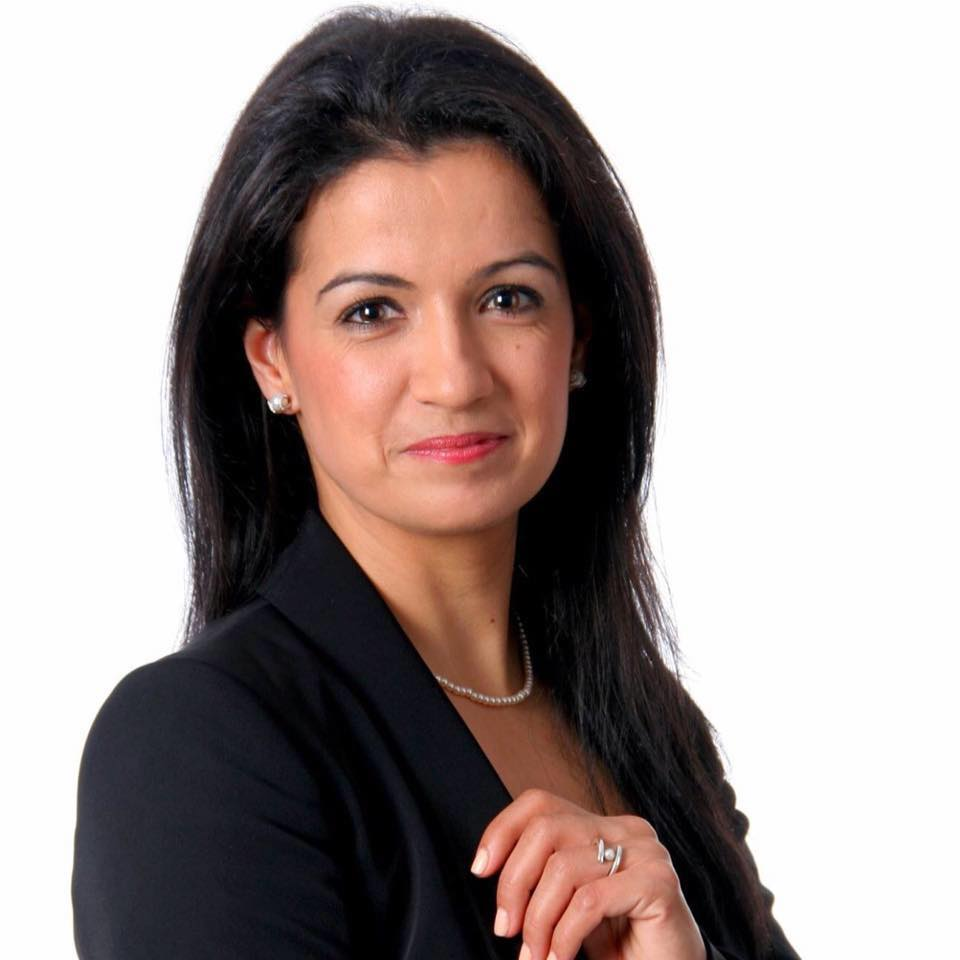
Gomes in 2019

Renata Gomes is a cardiovascular specialist who focusses her work on the use of molecular biology, imaging and nanotechnology applications for regeneration purposes. She is a professor of Veteran's Health and Biomedical Research and has also worked as a CEO of two health charities.

== Early life and education ==
Renata Gomes (born in 1985) was born in Barcelos, Portugal. At a young age she was dissecting birds that had been shot by hunters in her village. In her choice of career, she was also influenced by an uncle who was a forensic doctor at the Institute of Legal Medicine at the University of Minho in the northern Portuguese town of Braga. Her academic training was in the United Kingdom, where she received a Forensic Medicine and Forensic Sciences Degree from the University of Bradford, before doing post-graduate research and training in Cardiovascular Biochemistry and Medicine at University College London and an international PhD on Cardiovascular Regeneration and Nanotechnology with University of Coimbra in Portugal, the University of Oxford and the University of Eastern Finland (Kupio). Her work with the Universities of Coimbra, Oxford and Kupio on a nanoparticle that can contribute to cardiovascular regeneration placed her first in the 2011 Science-Image Competition organised by the British Heart Foundation.

== Career ==
Among the people with whom she has worked was the Nobel Prize winner, Professor Oliver Smithies. In Bradford, she worked over the holidays with Professor Karin Schallreuter on plastic surgery. While working with Professor Lino Ferreira at the Centre for Neuroscience and Cell Biology at Coimbra University, they had an idea to combine stem cell technology with nanotechnology. The research took place between 2008 and 2012. After the results were published, Gomes was nominated for and won the Science, Engineering and Technology for Britain 2012 award, given annually by the British Parliament. In 2013 her home town of Barcelos awarded her the title of Professional of the Year.

Part of her time is devoted to community and humanitarian causes. She has worked with the Small Scientists Network, based in her home town of Barcelos, which is aimed at promoting scientific curiosity among young people. Although having been treated for cancer, Gomes ran the London Marathon to raise money for the British Heart Foundation. While on a visit to Israel she contributed to a vaccination campaign among Bedouins. In Israel she met Henrique Cymerman, an Israeli journalist of Portuguese descent, with whom she decided to set up a Task Force called Knowledge for the Benefit of Mankind, to bring together religious leaders of various faiths and other influential thinkers and young people, to find realistic solutions in favour of peace.

Based in London, she then worked as Head of Research and Innovation for the charity Blind Veterans UK (formerly St Dunstan's), seeking to find regenerative-medicine solutions to benefit blind veterans. In 2020 she became its Chief Scientific Officer, before the Directorate became BRAVO VICTOR.

In February 2024, Police Care UK, a UK based charity to assist police officers who have come to harm through their policing duties, appointed Gomes as CEO.
