= Martim =

- Civil parish
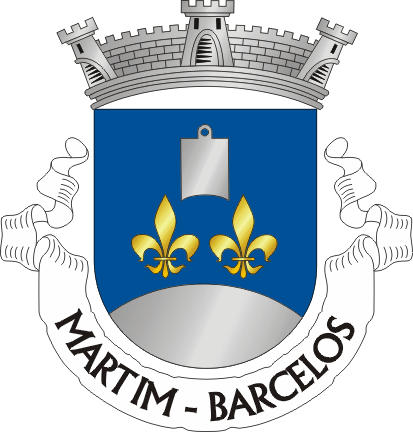
- Coat of arms

- Location in Portugal
- Coordinates: 41.534°N 8.512°W
- Country: Portugal
- Region: Norte
- Intermunic. comm.: Cávado
- District: Braga
- Municipality: Barcelos

Area
  - Total: 5.32 km^{2} (2.05 sq mi)

Population (2011)
  - Total: 2,375
  - Density: 450/km^{2} (1,200/sq mi)
- Time zone: UTC+00:00 (WET)
  - Summer (DST): UTC+01:00 (WEST)

Martim is a Portuguese parish, located in the municipality of Barcelos. The population in 2011 was 2,375, in an area of 5.32 km^{2}.

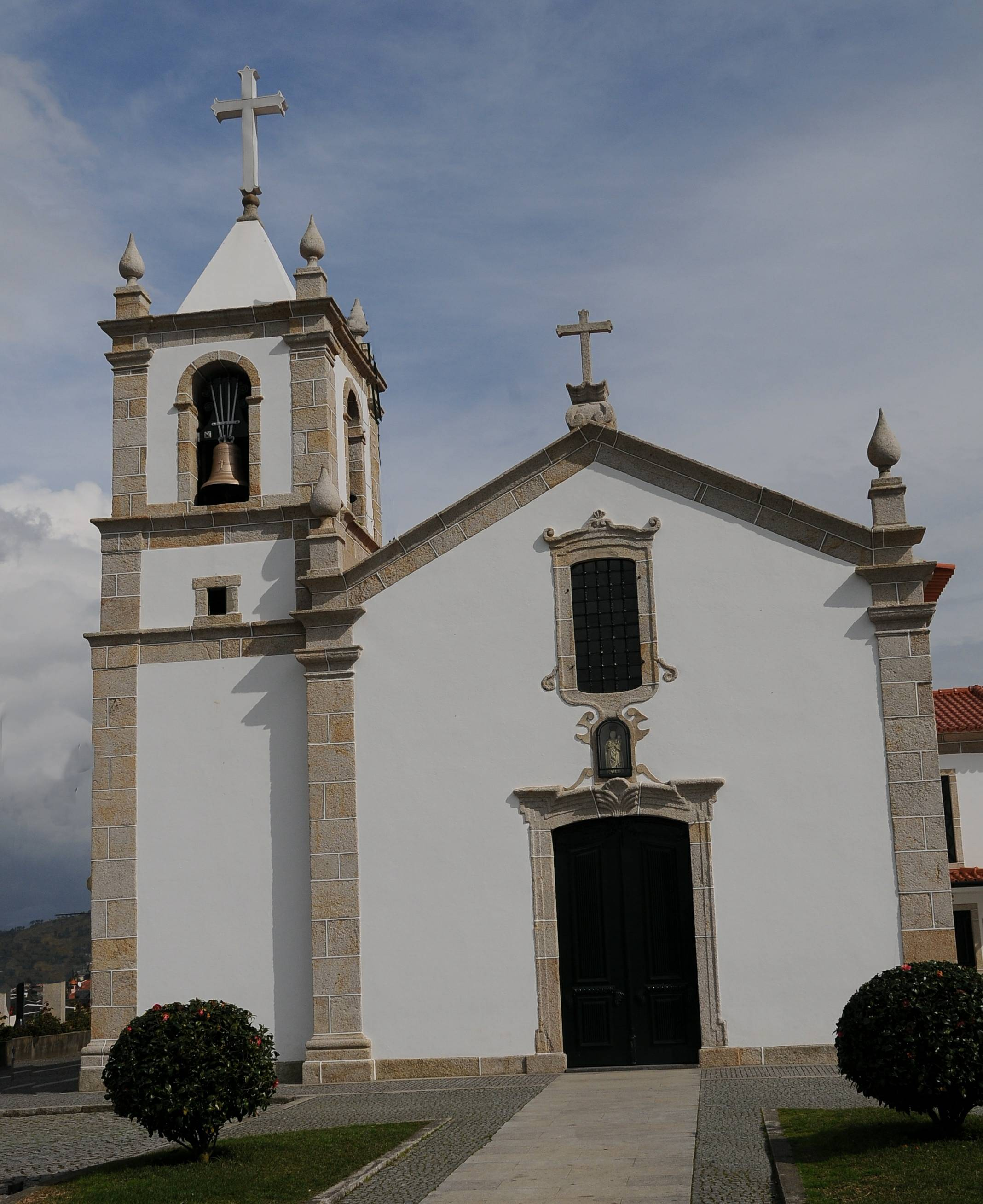
Martim Church
