= Vila Cova e Feitos =

- Civil parish
- Location in Portugal
- Coordinates: 41.546°N 8.713°W
- Country: Portugal
- Region: Norte
- Intermunic. comm.: Cávado
- District: Braga
- Municipality: Barcelos

Area
  - Total: 15.73 km^{2} (6.07 sq mi)

Population (2011)
  - Total: 2,564
  - Density: 163.0/km^{2} (422.2/sq mi)
- Time zone: UTC+00:00 (WET)
  - Summer (DST): UTC+01:00 (WEST)

Vila Cova e Feitos is a civil parish in the municipality of Barcelos, Portugal. It was formed in 2013 by the merger of the former parishes Vila Cova and Feitos. The population in 2011 was 2,564, in an area of 15.73 km^{2} (6.07 sq mi).
