= Igreja Matriz de Barcelos =

Church in Barcelos Municipality, Portugal

Coordinates: 41°31′43″N 8°37′19″W

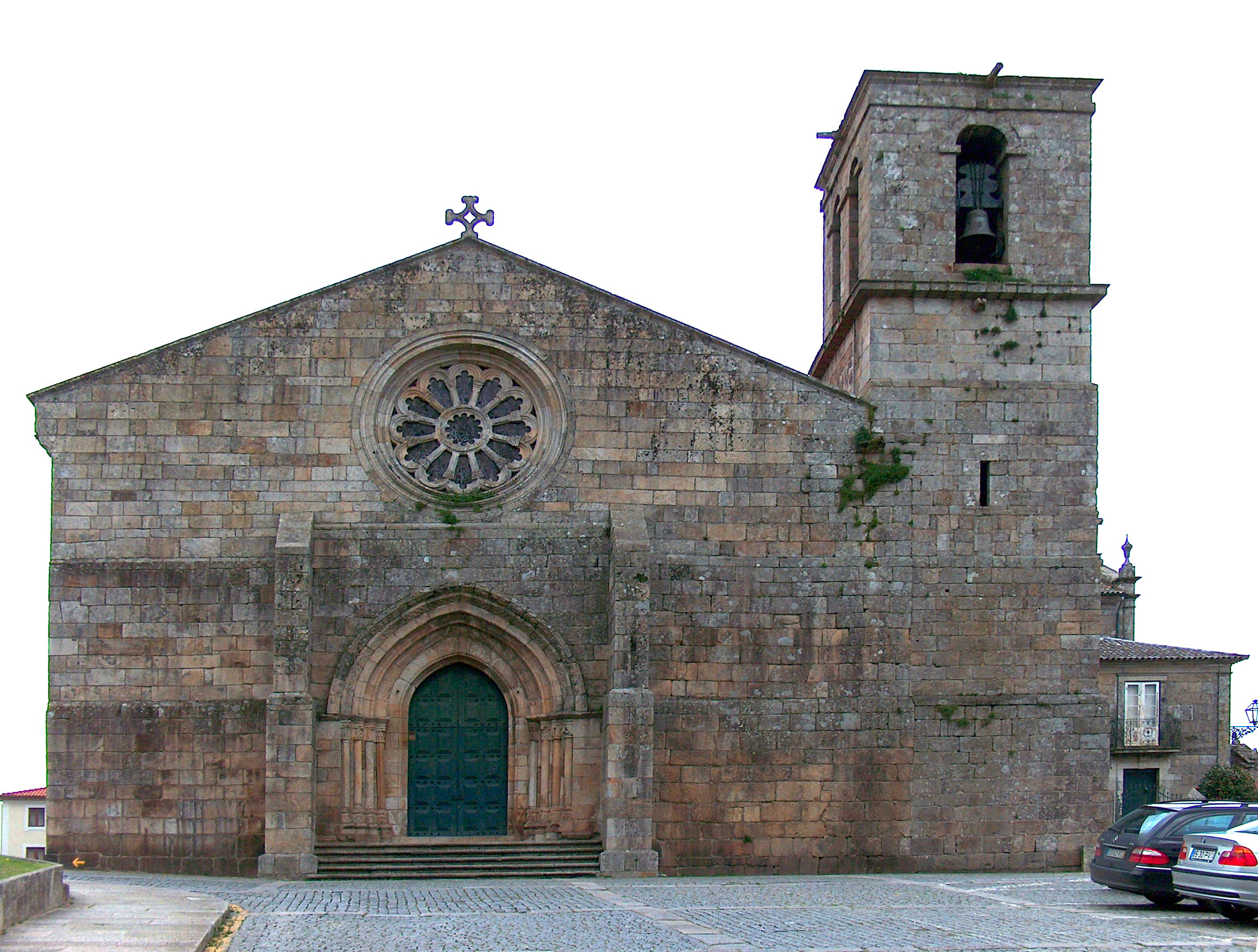
Igreja Matriz de Barcelos

Igreja Matriz de Barcelos is a church in Barcelos, Portugal. It is classified as a National Monument.
