= Barcelos Bridge =

Barcelos Bridge Ponte de Barcelos
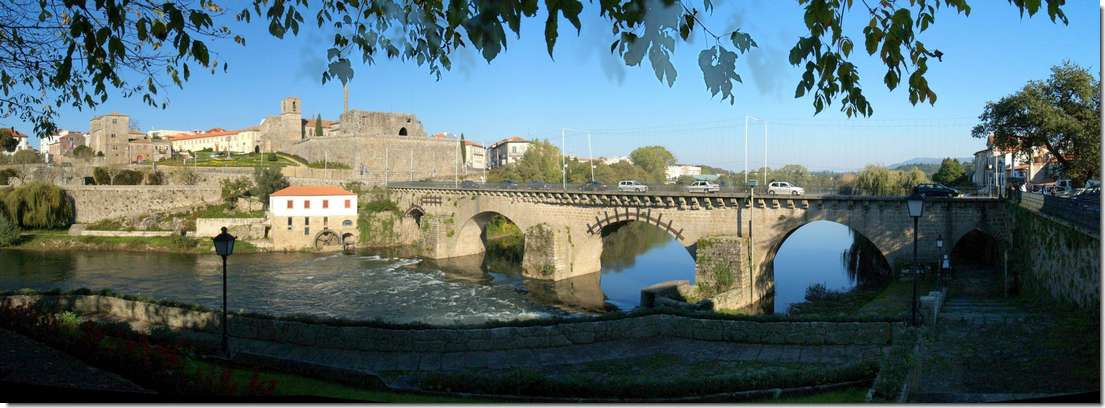
- Coordinates: 41°31′39″N 8°37′20″W
- Locale: Barcelos, Braga District, Portugal

Barcelos Bridge is a medieval bridge that crosses the Cávado River in Barcelos, Portugal. The bridge was classified as a National Monument in 1910. Construction started in 1325 by order of Pedro Afonso, Count of Barcelos; the structure underwent re-construction works during the XVII and XIX centuries. It features five uneven arches, with cutwaters in the pillars.

The old bridge awaits the construction of an alternative passage so it can be closed to transit, following concerns of the Direção-Geral do Património Cultural.

== See also ==
- List of bridges in Portugal
