= Milhazes =

Milhazes is a surname. Notable people with the surname include:

- Álvaro Milhazes (born 1997), Portuguese footballer
- Beatriz Milhazes (born 1960), Brazilian artist
- Carlos Milhazes (born 1981), Portuguese footballer

== See also ==
- Milhazes, Vilar de Figos e Faria
