= Tamel (Santa Leocádia) e Vilar do Monte =

- Civil parish
- Location in Portugal
- Coordinates: 41.553°N 8.590°W
- Country: Portugal
- Region: Norte
- Intermunic. comm.: Cávado
- District: Braga
- Municipality: Barcelos

Area
  - Total: 11.06 km^{2} (4.27 sq mi)

Population (2011)
  - Total: 1,420
  - Density: 130/km^{2} (330/sq mi)
- Time zone: UTC+00:00 (WET)
  - Summer (DST): UTC+01:00 (WEST)

Tamel (Santa Leocádia) e Vilar do Monte is a civil parish in the municipality of Barcelos, Portugal. It was formed in 2013 by the merger of the former parishes Tamel (Santa Leocádia) and Vilar do Monte. The population in 2011 was 1,420, in an area of 11.06 km^{2}.
