= Arcozelo (Barcelos) =

- Civil parish
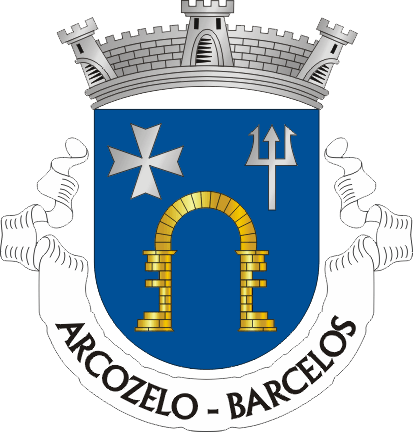
- Coat of arms

- Location in Portugal
- Coordinates: 41.548°N 8.602°W
- Country: Portugal
- Region: Norte
- Intermunic. comm.: Cávado
- District: Braga
- Municipality: Barcelos

Area
  - Total: 3.44 km^{2} (1.33 sq mi)

Population (2011)
  - Total: 12,840
  - Density: 3,730/km^{2} (9,670/sq mi)
- Time zone: UTC+00:00 (WET)
  - Summer (DST): UTC+01:00 (WEST)

Arcozelo (Portuguese pronunciation: [ɐɾkuˈzelu]) is a Portuguese freguesia ("civil parish") in the municipality of Barcelos. The population in 2011 was 12,840, in an area of 3.44 km^{2} (1.33 sq mi). It is the most populated parish in the municipality.
