= Lourenço de Almeida =

Portuguese explorer and military commander

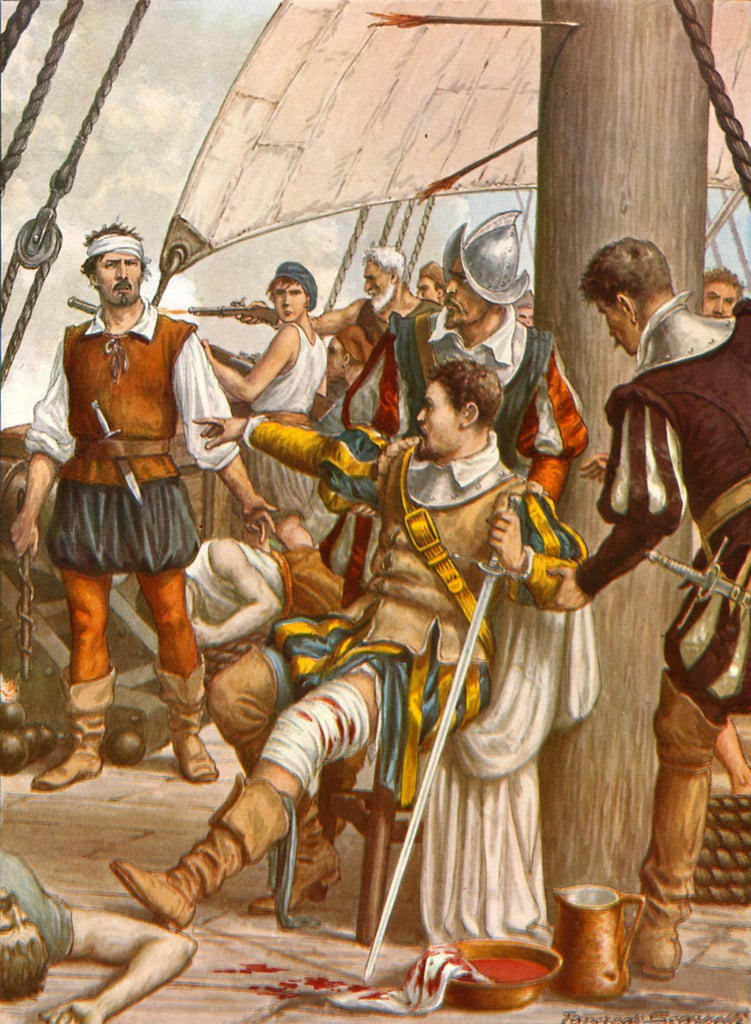
- Illustration of Lourenço de Almeida by Tancredi Scarpelli
- Born: c. 1480; Martim, Kingdom of Portugal
- Died: March 1508; Chaul, Portuguese India
- Relatives: Francisco de Almeida (father)
- Military career
- Allegiance: Kingdom of Portugal
- Branch: Portuguese Navy
- Conflicts: Battle of Cannanore; Battle of Chaul †

Lourenço de Almeida (c. 1480 – March 1508) was a Portuguese explorer and military commander.

He was born in Martim, Portugal, the son of Francisco de Almeida, first viceroy of Portuguese India. Acting under his father, Lourenço distinguished himself in the Indian Ocean, and made Ceylon (present Sri Lanka) tributary to Portugal (see Portuguese Ceylon). He belonged to the Order of Christ.

He made the first Portuguese voyage to Ceylon in 1505 and established a settlement there, thus permitting the expansion of the Portuguese Empire in Asia.

He defeated the fleet of the Zamorin at the Battle of Cannanore in 1506. Two years later however, he died in a naval action off Chaul, in India, at the Battle of Chaul against the naval forces of the Egyptian Mamluk Sultanate.

== See also ==
- Portuguese India
- Portuguese Ceylon
- Gujarati-Portuguese conflicts
- First Luso-Malabarese War
- Mamluk–Portuguese conflicts
