= Campo e Tamel (São Pedro Fins) =

- Civil parish
- Location in Portugal
- Coordinates: 41.592°N 8.612°W
- Country: Portugal
- Region: Norte
- Intermunic. comm.: Cávado
- District: Braga
- Municipality: Barcelos

Area
  - Total: 4.81 km^{2} (1.86 sq mi)

Population (2011)
  - Total: 1,521
  - Density: 316/km^{2} (819/sq mi)
- Time zone: UTC+00:00 (WET)
  - Summer (DST): UTC+01:00 (WEST)

Campo e Tamel (São Pedro Fins) is a civil parish in the municipality of Barcelos, Portugal. It was formed in 2013 by the merger of the former parishes Campo and Tamel (São Pedro Fins). The population in 2011 was 1,521, in an area of 4.81 km^{2} (1.86 sq mi).
