= Barcelos, Portugal =

Barcelos
- Municipality
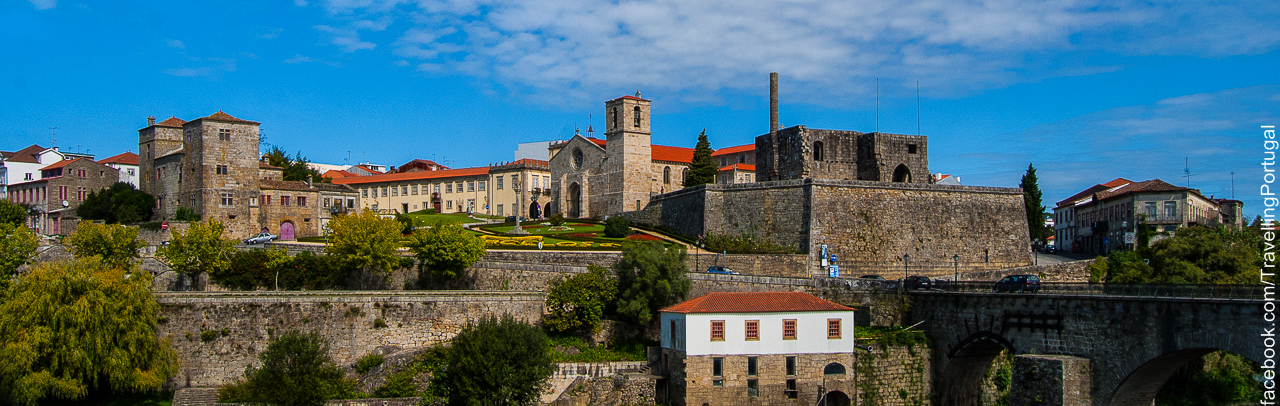
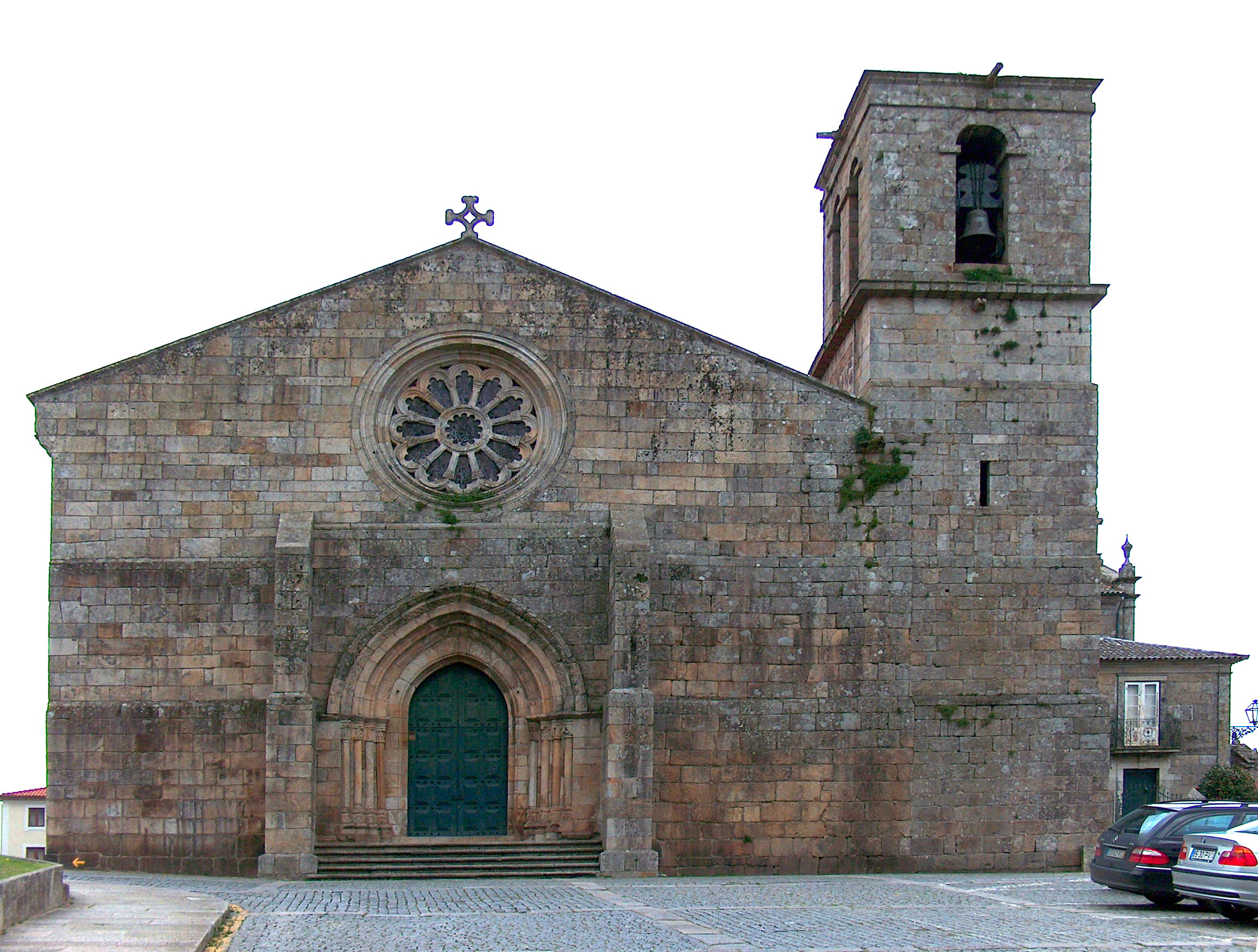
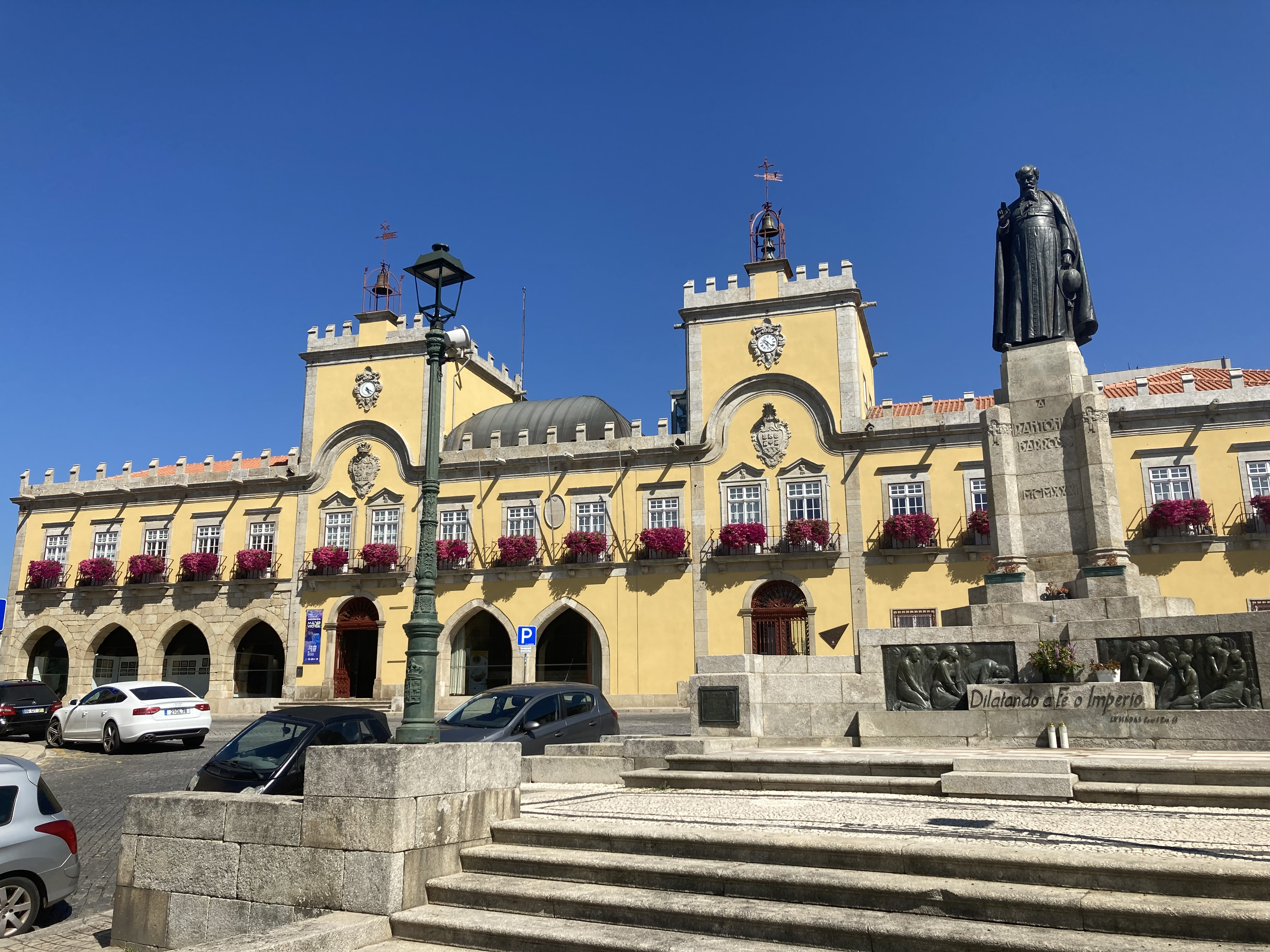
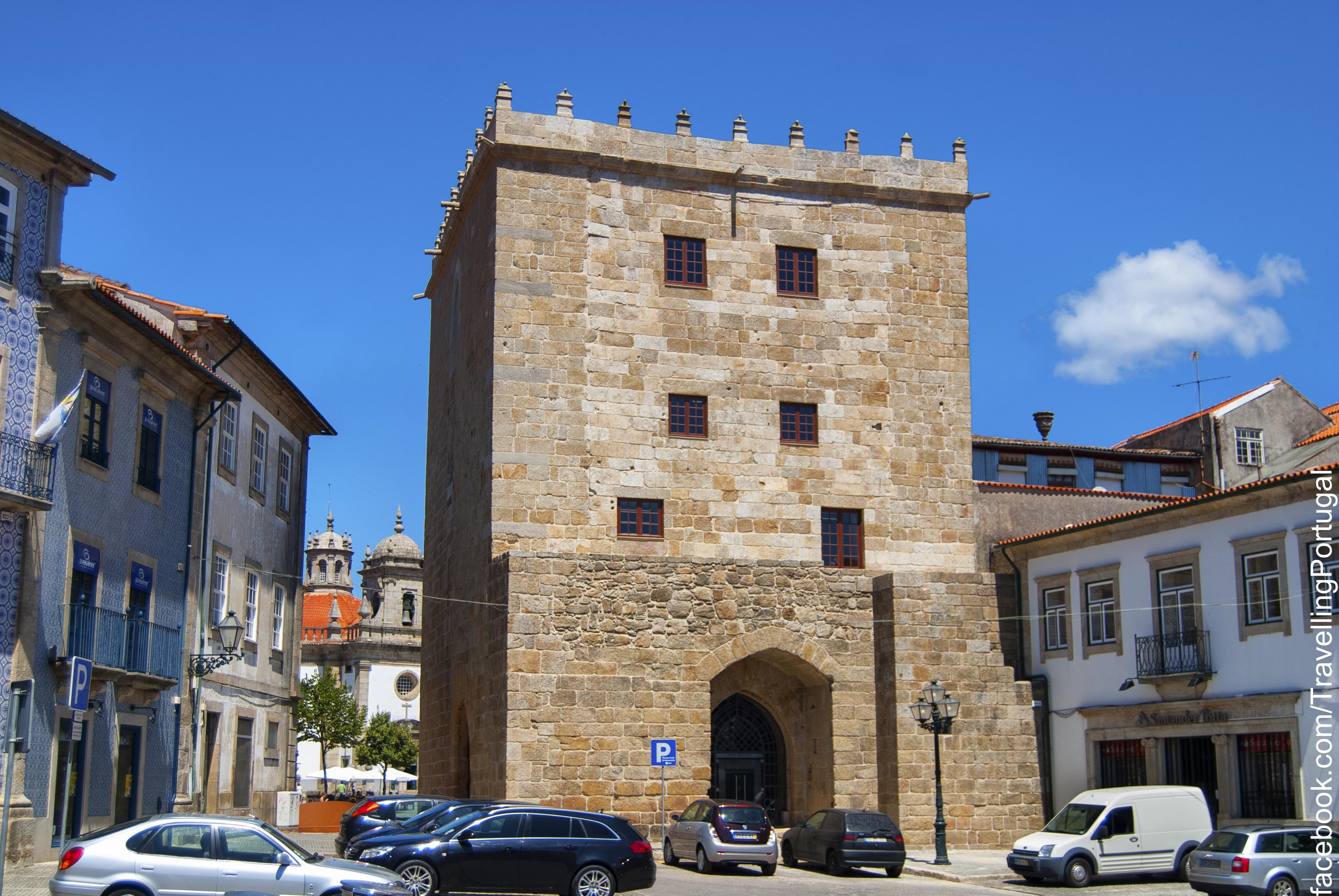
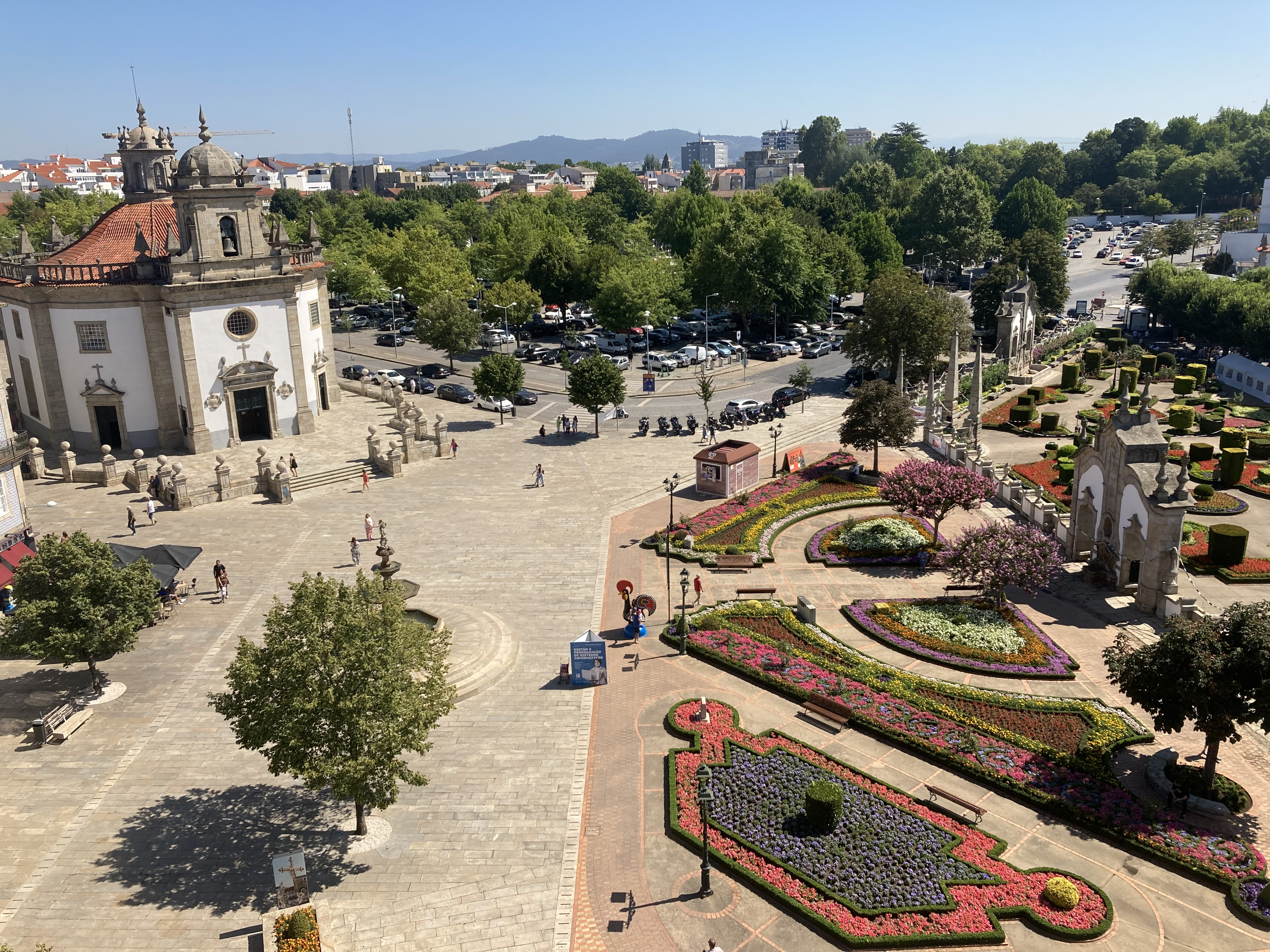
- Top: The entrance to the city of Barcelos coming from the parish of Barcelinhos; middle: Igreja Matriz de Barcelos; City Hall and statue of Bishop António Barroso; bottom: The medieval tower; Tower view of the Church of Bom Jesus da Cruz and the gardens

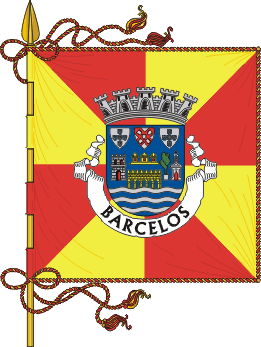
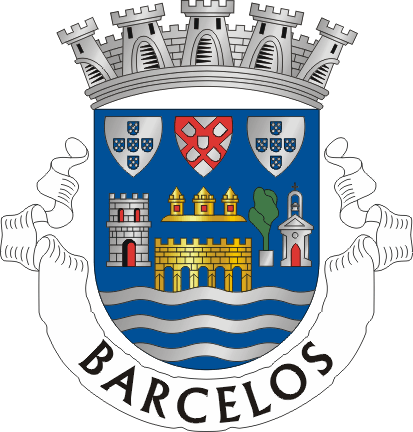
- Flag Coat of arms
- Interactive map of Barcelos
- Country: Portugal
- Region: Norte
- Intermunic. comm.: Cávado
- District: Braga
- Parishes: 60

Government
  - President: Mário Constantino Lopes (PSD)

Area
  - Total: 378.90 km^{2} (146.29 sq mi)

Population (2024)
  - Total: 116,959
  - Density: 308.68/km^{2} (799.48/sq mi)
- Time zone: UTC+00:00 (WET)
  - Summer (DST): UTC+01:00 (WEST)
- Website: https://www.cm-barcelos.pt

Barcelos (Portuguese pronunciation: [bɐɾˈsɛluʃ]) is a city and a municipality in Braga District in the Minho Province, in the north of Portugal. The city of Barcelos had 26,042 inhabitants in 2021, while the municipality had 116,959 inhabitants in 2024 across an area of 378.90 square kilometres (146.29 mi^{2}). With 61 parishes, it is the municipality with the highest number of parishes in the country. Barcelos lies on the Portuguese Way, a Christian pilgrimage route connecting to the Camino de Santiago.

It is known for the Rooster of Barcelos and for its textile and adobe industries, as well as its horseback riding events and "figurado" style of pottery, which are comical figurines with accentuated features of farmers, folk musicians, and nativity scene characters. Barcelos is part of the UNESCO Creative Cities Network as a Crafts and Folk Art City.

== History ==
=== Early settlements ===
The area of present-day Barcelos municipality shows evidence of human occupation since prehistoric times. Findings from this period include a hillfort (castro) from at least the Iron Age, located on Saia mountain, in the parish of Carvalhas. Rock carvings have been found at this site, including a depiction of a swastica, a rare finding in Portugal, and circular and hook shaped drawings.

During the Roman period, a villa was established in the area of Vila Cova, likely used for agricultural production. This marked a transition in the population centers from the hilltops towards the lower fertile lands. Ceramic findings indicate that this locality was likely continuously inhabited habitation, even after the conquest of the area by the Suebi and the Visigoths.

=== Medieval town ===
The site of the medieval town of Barcelos does not appear to have been settled before the foundation of Portugal in the 12th century. Its location was significant as a crossing point on the route from Porto to Ponte de Lima and Viana do Castelo, and it became an important stop for pilgrims travelling to Santiago de Compostela. Afonso I granted Barcelos a royal charter (foral) between 1156 and 1169 and by 1177 the town already housed a leper hospital outside the walls, making it one of the earliest such institutions in Portugal.

In the 1258 Inquirições, it is mentioned that 78 households lived in the town and couto of Barcelos. Then, the town was organized around a central core with its church and butcheries, surrounded by suburban neighbourhoods such as Cimo de Vila and Fundo da Vila. The main thoroughfare, corresponding roughly to the modern Rua António Barroso, linked the southern river crossing with the northern road. In 1298 King Denis created the title of Count of Barcelos, granting the town and surrounding lands to João Afonso Telo.

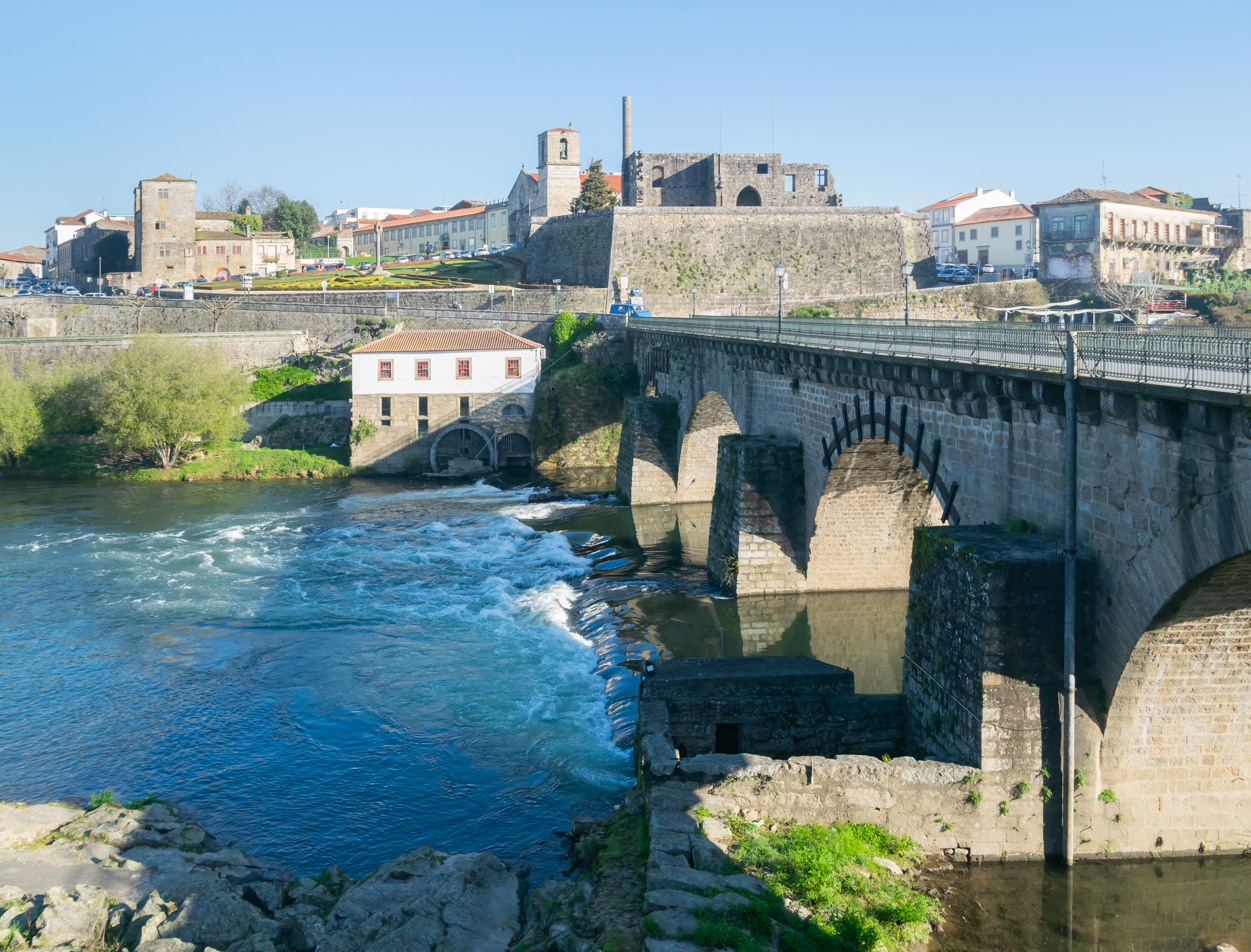
Barcelos Bridge

The town’s development accelerated with the construction of the Barcelos Bridge over the Cávado River, commissioned by Count Pedro Afonso and built between 1325 and 1328. The Gothic bridge greatly facilitated communication between Barcelos and Barcelinhos and reinforced the town's role as a regional commercial hub. Around the same period, Count Pedro ordered the enlargement of the parish church, today’s Igreja Matriz de Barcelos.

The 14th century also saw the establishment of a Jewish community in Barcelos. The first reference dates from 1369, and by the late 15th century about twenty Jewish families lived in the town, with a synagogue and a distinct Jewish quarter. Following the decree of 1497 issued by Manuel I, Barcelos’s Jews were forced to convert, becoming New Christians.

The town further expanded during the 15th century, under the influence of Count Afonso, the first Duke of Bragança. He ordered the construction of the Palace of the Counts of Barcelos shortly after his marriage in 1401 to the daughter of Constable Nuno Álvares Pereira. In 1425, the town was enclosed by defensive walls, including defensive towers. Other works of this period included the pillory and the enlargement of the parish church, which was elevated to collegiate status in 1464. Surviving references indicate that in this century most of Barcelos' houses were roofed and one or two stories high, although some rare three-story buildings are also recorded, such as the Solar dos Pinheiros.

=== Modern era ===
King Manuel I granted Barcelos a new royal charter in 1515. Around the same time, the town expanded beyond the medieval walls. This growth was linked to the Miracle of the Holy Cross in 1504, when a cross was said to have appeared in the fairground. A chapel was soon erected on the site, and in 1505 a local merchant donated an image of Christ brought from Flanders.

In the 18th century, Barcelos benefited from wealth returning from Brazil, which financed the construction of manor houses. In addition, several religious buildings were built, such as the Igreja do Senhor da Cruz, the Monastery of Terço, and the Igreja da Ordem Terceira de São Francisco. The Campo da Feira, increasingly surrounded by substantial buildings, became a central space for commerce and religious festivities. In 1755, an earthquaque felt across Portugal caused part of the town's walls to collapse.

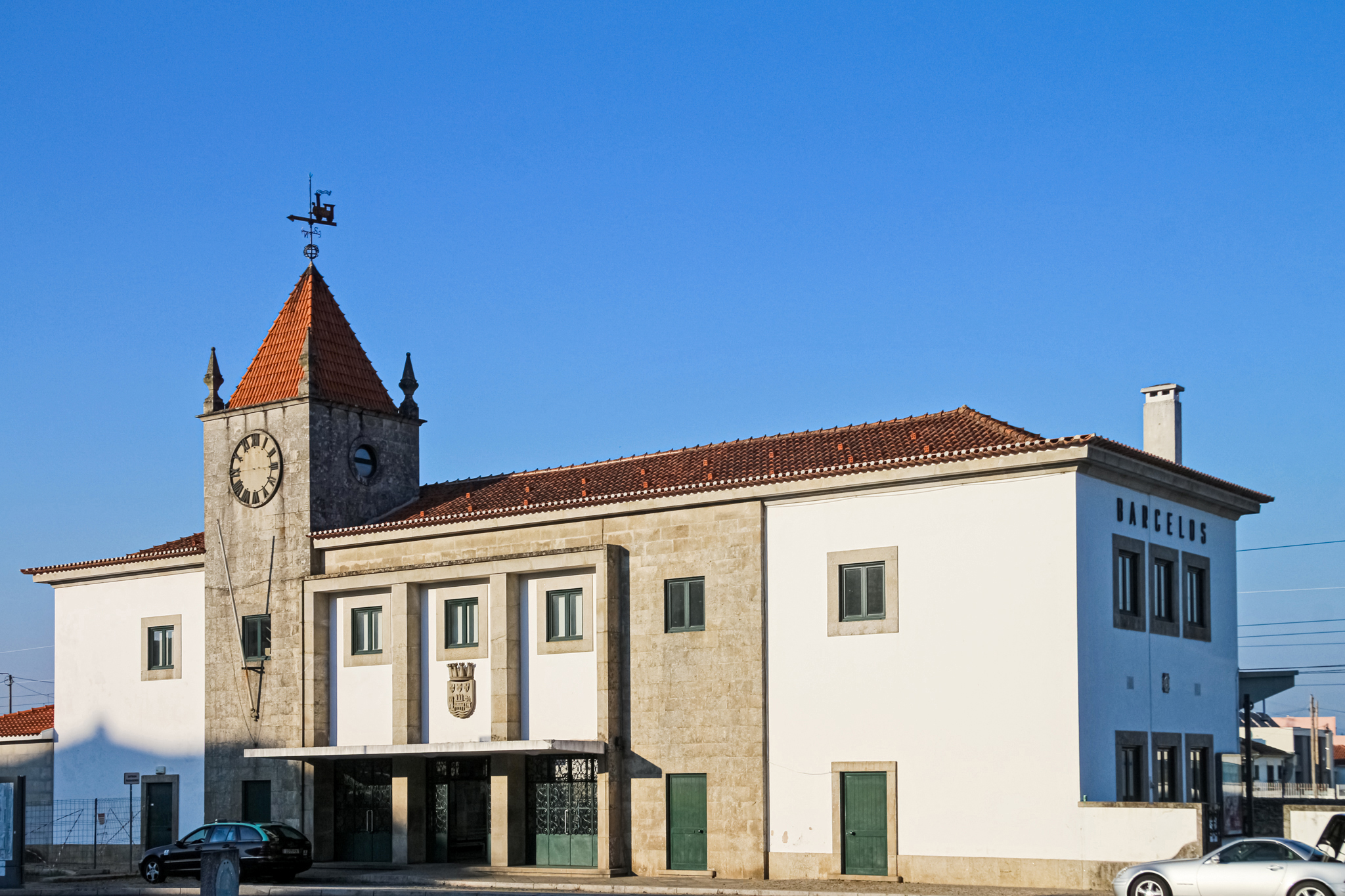
Barcelos railway station

The 19th century brought significant changes to Barcelos and Portugal, following the Peninsular War and the Liberal Wars. The dissolution of monasteries in 1834 led to major changes in urban property, as religious buildings were repurposed. During the second half of the century, the town saw significant urban improvements, including the D. Pedro V Market in 1866, the municipal cemetery in 1877, and the introduction of piped water and public lighting. In 1870 a spinning factory was established near the Cávado River, marking the early stages of industrial activity in the town. The arrival of the Minho railway line in 1877 proved decisive for Barcelos’s development. The railway bridge, designed by Gustave Eiffel, and the new train station, reinforced growth towards the north and northeast, attracting factories, workshops, and middle-class residences.

Barcelos continued to grow during the 20th century, and was elevated to city status in 1928. This economic development led to the demolition of most of its medieval walls, as well as the redevelopment of parts of the historic centre.

== Rooster ==
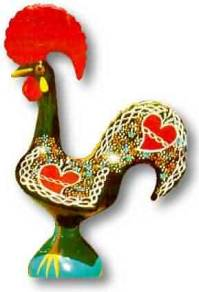
The Rooster of Barcelos

The town is closely associated with the Rooster of Barcelos (Portuguese: o galo de Barcelos), which often serves as a national symbol of Portugal. This depiction originates in a tale associated with the Senhor do Galo stone cross in Barcelos.

According to one version of the story, a Galician pilgrim on his way to Santiago de Compostela was wrongly accused of a crime and condemned to hang. Before his execution he asked to be taken to the judge who had sentenced him. The judge was dining with friends, and the pilgrim declared that a roasted rooster on the table would crow as proof of his innocence. When the pilgrim was being hanged, the bird miraculously stood up and crowed. The judge rushed to the gallows and found that the knot had not tightened, saving the pilgrim’s life and freeing him. The pilgrim later returned to Barcelos and erected a stone cross commemorating the divine providence.

Several other versions of the story are known. In one, an innkeeper hides a silver object in the pilgrim’s bag to accuse him of theft, and the miracle is produced by a rooster that he carried. Other retellings introduce saintly figures such as James the Great, St. Paul or Our lady of the Pillar, reflecting the iconography of the Senhor do Galo stone cross.

== Geography ==
Barcelos municipality covers an area of 378.90 square kilometres (146.29 mi^{2}) and is located in the Cávado intermunicipal community, in Braga District, in the North of Portugal. It is bounded by the municipalities of Viana do Castelo and Ponte de Lima to the north, Vila Verde and Braga to the east, Vila Nova de Famalicão to the southeast, Póvoa de Varzim to the southwest, and Esposende to the west. The municipality is divided into 61 civil parishes and the city of Barcelos comprises the parishes of Barcelos, Vila Boa e Vila Frescainha, Barcelinhos and Arcozelo.

=== Parishes ===
Administratively, the municipality is divided into 61 civil parishes (freguesias):

- Abade de Neiva
- Aborim
- Adães
- Airó
- Aldreu
- Alheira e Igreja Nova
- Alvelos
- Alvito (São Pedro e São Martinho) e Couto
- Arcozelo
- Areias
- Areias de Vilar e Encourados
- Balugães
- Barcelinhos
- Barcelos, Vila Boa e Vila Frescainha (São Martinho e São Pedro)
- Barqueiros
- Cambeses
- Campo e Tamel (São Pedro Fins)
- Carapeços
- Carreira e Fonte Coberta
- Carvalhal
- Carvalhas
- Chorente, Góios, Courel, Pedra Furada e Gueral
- Cossourado
- Creixomil e Mariz
- Cristelo
- Durrães e Tregosa
- Fornelos
- Fragoso
- Galegos (Santa Maria)
- Galegos (São Martinho)
- Gamil e Midões
- Gilmonde
- Lama
- Lijó
- Macieira de Rates
- Manhente
- Martim
- Milhazes, Vilar de Figos e Faria
- Moure
- Negreiros e Chavão
- Oliveira
- Palme
- Panque
- Paradela
- Pereira
- Perelhal
- Pousa
- Quintiães e Aguiar
- Remelhe
- Rio Covo (Santa Eugénia)
- Roriz
- Sequeade e Bastuço (São João e Santo Estêvão)
- Silva
- Silveiros e Rio Covo (Santa Eulália)
- Tamel (Santa Leocádia) e Vilar do Monte
- Tamel (São Veríssimo)
- Ucha
- Várzea
- Viatodos, Grimancelos, Minhotães e Monte de Fralães
- Vila Cova e Feitos
- Vila Seca

== Climate ==
Barcelos has a Mediterranean climate (Köppen: Csb) with warm summers and very wet, mild winters.

Climate data for Barcelos, 1985-2021, altitude: 36 m (118 ft)
Month	Jan	Feb	Mar	Apr	May	Jun	Jul	Aug	Sep	Oct	Nov	Dec	Year
Daily mean °C (°F)	9.0 (48.2)	9.9 (49.8)	12.0 (53.6)	13.3 (55.9)	16.1 (61.0)	18.8 (65.8)	20.7 (69.3)	20.5 (68.9)	19.0 (66.2)	15.9 (60.6)	12.0 (53.6)	9.9 (49.8)	14.8 (58.6)
Average precipitation mm (inches)	175.0 (6.89)	138.1 (5.44)	116.7 (4.59)	125.9 (4.96)	88.3 (3.48)	40.9 (1.61)	25.2 (0.99)	28.0 (1.10)	67.1 (2.64)	178.2 (7.02)	185.9 (7.32)	182.8 (7.20)	1,352.1 (53.24)
Source: Portuguese Environment Agency

== Notable people ==
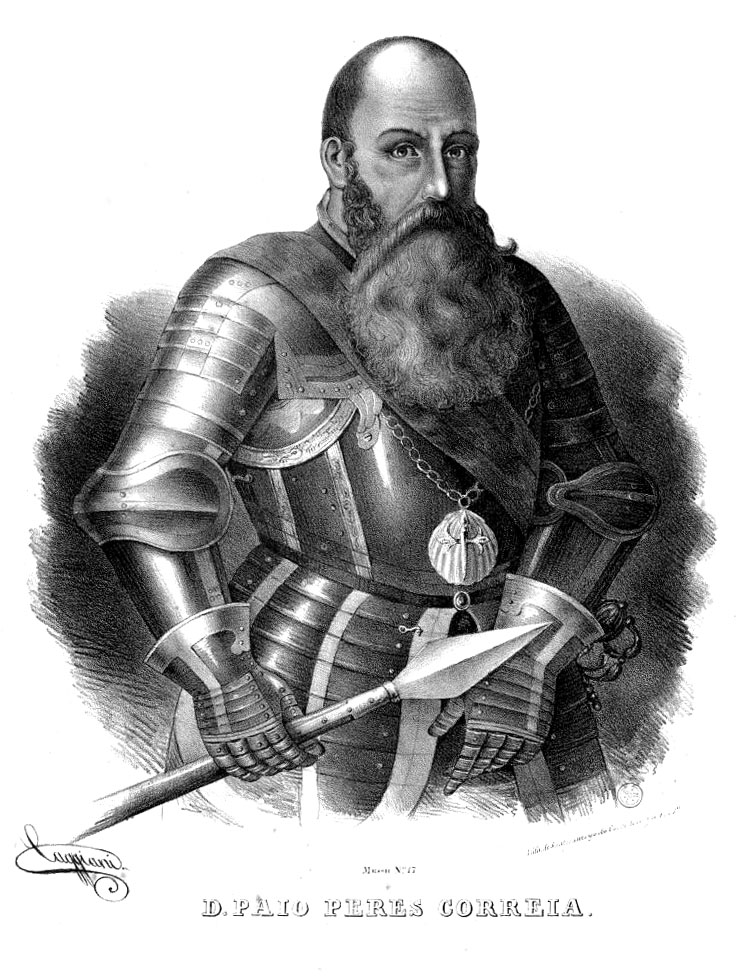
Paio Peres Correia

- Maria José Aguiar (born 1948) an artist, whose work explored feminist themes.
- Lourenço de Almeida (c. 1480–1508) an explorer and military commander from Martim.
- Pedro Afonso (1289–1350) illegitimate son of King Denis and the third Count of Barcelos.
- António Barroso (1854–1918) the 8th Prelate of Mozambique, from 1891 to 1897.
- Paio Peres Correia (c. 1205–1275) a Reconquista warrior from Monte de Fralães.
- Gaspar de Faria (c. 1520–1576) the 6th Bishop of Angra, from 1571 and 1576.
- Renata Gomes (born 1985) a cardiovascular specialist and academic.
- João Garcia de Guilhade (1239–1288) a trobadour from Milhazes.
- Isabel of Barcelos (1402–1466) a lady of the Portuguese nobility.
- Gisela João (born 1983) a fado singer with a number one album in Portugal.
- Honório Novo (born 1950) a politician and former member of parliament for the Portuguese Communist Party.

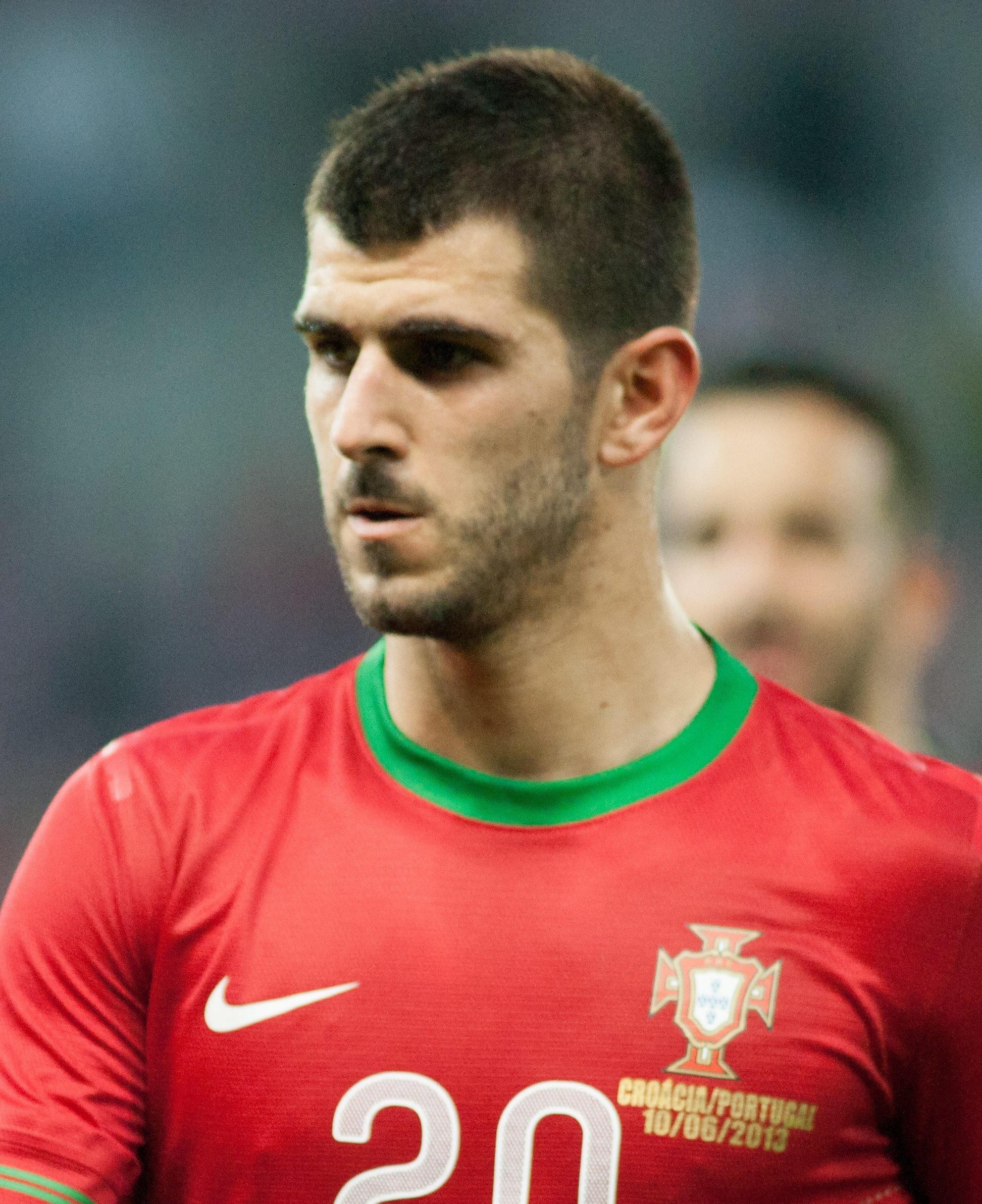
Nelson Oliveira, 2013

=== Sport ===
- Capucho (born 1972) a former footballer with 410 club caps and 34 with Portugal.
- Dito (1962–2020) a footballer with 383 club caps and 17 with Portugal.
- José Gonçalves (born 1989) a cyclist who won the 2016 Tour of Turkey.
- Hélder Nunes (born 1994) a roller hockey player who has played for the Portuguese national team.
- Nélson Oliveira (born 1991) a footballer with over 368 club caps and 17 with Portugal.
- Paulinho (born 1992) a footballer with over 426 club caps and 3 with Portugal.
- Hugo Viana (born 1983) a footballer with 321 club caps and 29 with Portugal.

== Sport ==
Barcelos is home to Gil Vicente Futebol Clube (football) and Óquei Clube de Barcelos (roller hockey). The city has a multi-use stadium, Estádio Cidade de Barcelos, which is primarily used for football matches.

== Twin Cities ==
- El Jadida, Morocco
- Pontevedra, Spain
- Recife, Brazil
- São Domingos, Cape Verde
- Svishtov, Bulgaria
- Vierzon, France
