= Cávado (intermunicipal community) =

- Intermunicipal community
- Logo
- Interactive map of Cávado
- Location in Portugal
- Coordinates: 41°33′N 8°28′W
- Country: Portugal
- Region: Northern Portugal
- Established: 2008
- Seat: Braga
- Municipalities: 6

Area
  - Total: 1,245.79 km^{2} (481.00 sq mi)

Population (2011)
  - Total: 410,169
  - Density: 329.244/km^{2} (852.738/sq mi)
- Time zone: UTC+00:00 (WET)
  - Summer (DST): UTC+01:00 (WEST)
- Website: www.cimcavado.pt

The Comunidade Intermunicipal do Cávado (European Portuguese pronunciation: [ˈkavɐðu]) is an administrative division in northern Portugal. It was created in 2008. It is also a NUTS3 subregion of the Norte Region. The seat of the intermunicipal community is Braga, Norte. Cávado comprises part of the former Braga District. The population in 2011 was 410,169, in an area of 1,245.79 square kilometres (481.00 mi^{2}), which makes it one of the most densely populated subregions of Portugal. Currently, as of 2021, it has 416,679 inhabitants and a population density of 351 per square kilometres.

Its name is derived from the Cávado River that drains a large part of its territory. It borders the intermunicipal community of Ave and the Metropolitan Area of Porto to the south, Alto Tâmega to the east, Alto Minho to the north and the Atlantic Ocean to the west.

== Municipalities ==
It is composed of six municipalities:

Municipality	Population (2011)	Area (km^{2})
Amares	18,889	81.95
Barcelos	120,391	378.90
Braga	181,494	183.40
Esposende	34,254	95.41
Terras de Bouro	7,253	277.46
Vila Verde	47,888	228.67
Total	410,169	1,245.79
