= List of freguesias of Portugal: B =

The freguesias (civil parishes) of Portugal are listed in by municipality according to the following format:

- concelho
  - freguesias

== Baião ==
- Ancede
- Baião (Santa Leocádia)
- Campelo
- Frende
- Gestaçô
- Gove
- Grilo
- Loivos da Ribeira
- Loivos do Monte
- Mesquinhata
- Ovil
- Ribadouro
- Santa Cruz do Douro
- Santa Marinha do Zêzere
- São Tomé de Covelas
- Teixeira
- Teixeiró
- Tresouras
- Valadares
- Viariz

== Barcelos ==
- Abade de Neiva
- Aborim
- Adães
- Aguiar
- Airó
- Aldreu
- Alheira
- Alvelos
- Alvito (São Martinho)
- Alvito (São Pedro)
- Arcozelo
- Areias
- Areias de Vilar
- Balugães
- Barcelinhos
- Barcelos
- Barqueiros
- Bastuço (Santo Estêvão)
- Bastuço (São João)
- Cambeses
- Campo
- Carapeços
- Carreira
- Carvalhal (Barcelos)
- Carvalhos
- Chavão
- Chorente
- Cossourado
- Courel
- Couto
- Creixomil
- Cristelo
- Durrães
- Encourados
- Faria
- Feitos
- Fonte Coberta
- Fornelos
- Fragoso
- Galegos (Santa Maria)
- Galegos (São Martinho)
- Gamil
- Gilmonde
- Góios
- Grimancelos
- Gueral
- Igreja Nova
- Lama
- Lijó
- Macieira de Rates
- Manhente
- Mariz
- Martim
- Midões
- Milhazes
- Minhotães
- Monte de Fralães
- Moure
- Negreiros
- Oliveira
- Palme
- Panque
- Paradela
- Pedra Furada (Chorente, Góios, Courel, Pedra Furada e Gueral)
- Pereira
- Perelhal
- Pousa
- Quintiães
- Remelhe
- Rio Covo (Santa Eugénia)
- Rio Covo (Santa Eulália)
- Roriz
- Sequeade
- Silva
- Silveiros
- Tamel (Santa Leocádia)
- Tamel (São Pedro Fins)
- Tamel (São Veríssimo)
- Tregosa
- Ucha
- Várzea
- Viatodos
- Vila Boa
- Vila Cova
- Vila Frescainha (São Martinho)
- Vila Frescainha (São Pedro)
- Vila Seca
- Vilar de Figos
- Vilar do Monte

== Barrancos ==
- Barrancos

== Barreiro ==
- Alto do Seixalinho
- Barreiro
- Coina
- Lavradio
- Palhais
- Santo André
- Santo António da Charneca
- Verderena

== Batalha ==
- Batalha
- Golpilheira
- Reguengo do Fetal
- São Mamede

== Beja ==
- Albernoa
- Baleizão
- Beja (Salvador)
- Beja (Santa Maria da Feira)
- Beja (Santiago Maior)
- Beja (São João Baptista)
- Beringel
- Cabeça Gorda
- Mombeja
- Nossa Senhora das Neves
- Quintos
- Salvada
- Santa Clara de Louredo
- Santa Vitória
- São Brissos
- São Matias
- Trigaches
- Trindade

== Belmonte ==
- Belmonte
- Caria
- Colmeal da Torre
- Inguias
- Maçainhas

== Benavente ==
- Barrosa
- Benavente
- Samora Correia
- Santo Estêvão

== Bombarral ==
- Bombarral
- Carvalhal
- Pó
- Roliça
- Vale Covo

== Borba ==
- Borba (Matriz)
- Borba (São Bartolomeu)
- Orada
- Rio de Moinhos

== Boticas ==
- Alturas do Barroso
- Ardãos
- Beça
- Bobadela
- Boticas
- Cerdedo
- Codessoso
- Covas do Barroso
- Curros
- Dornelas
- Fiães do Tâmega
- Granja
- Pinho
- São Salvador de Viveiro
- Sapiãos
- Vilar

== Braga ==
- Adaúfe
- Arcos
- Arentim
- Aveleda
- Braga (Cividade)
- Braga (Maximinos)
- Braga (São João do Souto)
- Braga (São José de São Lázaro)
- Braga (São Vicente)
- Braga (São Vítor)
- Braga (Sé)
- Cabreiros
- Celeirós
- Crespos
- Cunha
- Dume
- Escudeiros
- Espinho
- Esporões
- Este (São Mamede)
- Este (São Pedro)
- Ferreiros
- Figueiredo
- Fradelos
- Fraião
- Frossos
- Gondizalves
- Gualtar
- Guisande
- Lamaçães
- Lamas
- Lomar
- Merelim (São Paio)
- Merelim (São Pedro)
- Mire de Tibães
- Morreira
- Navarra
- Nogueira
- Nogueiró
- Oliveira (São Pedro)
- Padim da Graça
- Palmeira
- Panoias
- Parada de Tibães
- Passos (São Julião)
- Pedralva
- Penso (Santo Estêvão)
- Penso (São Vicente)
- Pousada
- Priscos
- Real
- Ruilhe
- Santa Lucrécia de Algeriz
- Semelhe
- Sequeira
- Sobreposta
- Tadim
- Tebosa
- Tenões
- Trandeiras
- Vilaça
- Vimieiro

== Bragança ==
- Alfaião
- Aveleda
- Babe
- Baçal
- Santa Maria
- Sé
- Calvelhe
- Carragosa
- Carrazedo
- Castrelos
- Castro de Avelãs
- Coelhoso
- Deilão
- Donai
- Espinhosela
- Failde
- França
- Gimonde
- Gondesende
- Gostei
- Grijó de Parada
- Izeda
- Macedo do Mato
- Meixedo
- Milhão
- Mós
- Nogueira
- Outeiro
- Parada
- Paradinha Nova
- Parâmio
- Pinela
- Pombares
- Quintanilha
- Quintela de Lampaças
- Rabal
- Rebordainhos
- Rebordãos
- Rio de Onor
- Rio Frio
- Salsas
- Samil
- Santa Comba de Rossas
- São Julião de Palácios
- São Pedro de Sarracenos
- Sendas
- Serapicos
- Sortes
- Zoio
