= Creixomil =

Creixomil may refer to the following parishes in Portugal:

- Creixomil (Barcelos), in the municipality of Barcelos
- Creixomil (Guimarães), in the municipality of Guimarães
