= Midões =

Midões may refer to:

- Midões (Barcelos), a parish in the municipality of Barcelos, Portugal
- Midões (Tábua), a parish in the municipality of Tábua, Portugal
