= Cunha (disambiguation) =

Cunha is a Galician and Portuguese surname of toponymic origin. It may also refer to:

- Cunha, São Paulo, city in Brazil.
- Cunha (Braga), parish in Portugal.
- Cunha (Paredes de Coura), parish in Portugal.
- Cunha (Sernancelhe), parish in Portugal.
- Rua do Cunha, street in Macau, China.
- Tristan da Cunha, group of British islands in the south Atlantic Ocean.
