= Morreira e Trandeiras =

- Civil parish
- Location in Portugal
- Coordinates: 41.497°N 8.406°W
- Country: Portugal
- Region: Norte
- Intermunic. comm.: Cávado
- District: Braga
- Municipality: Braga

Area
  - Total: 4.54 km^{2} (1.75 sq mi)

Population (2011)
  - Total: 1,447
  - Density: 319/km^{2} (825/sq mi)
- Time zone: UTC+00:00 (WET)
  - Summer (DST): UTC+01:00 (WEST)

Morreira e Trandeiras is a civil parish in the municipality of Braga, Portugal. It was formed in 2013 by the merger of the former parishes Morreira and Trandeiras. The population in 2011 was 1,447, in an area of 4.54 km^{2} (1.75 sq mi).

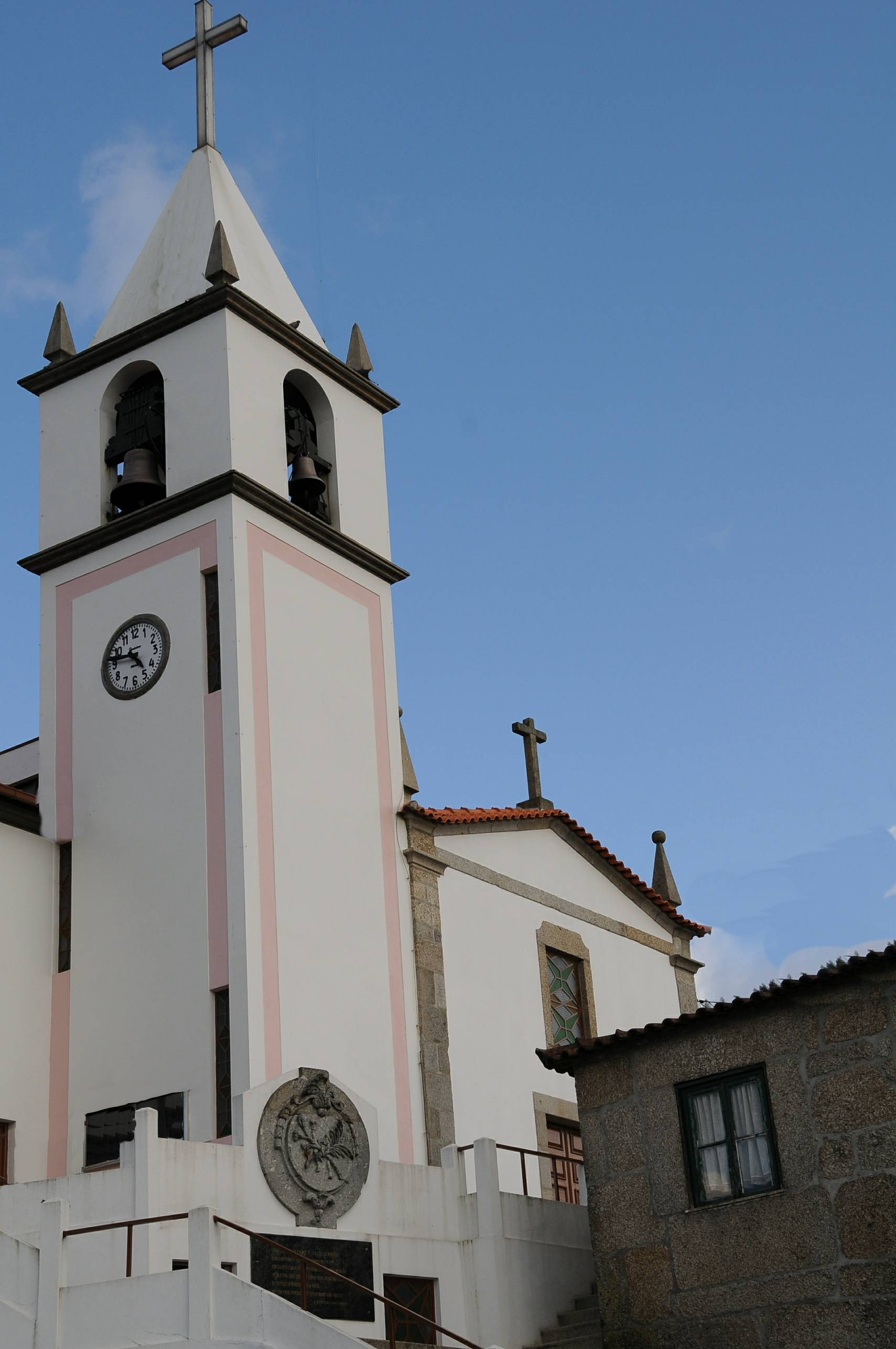
Morreira Church

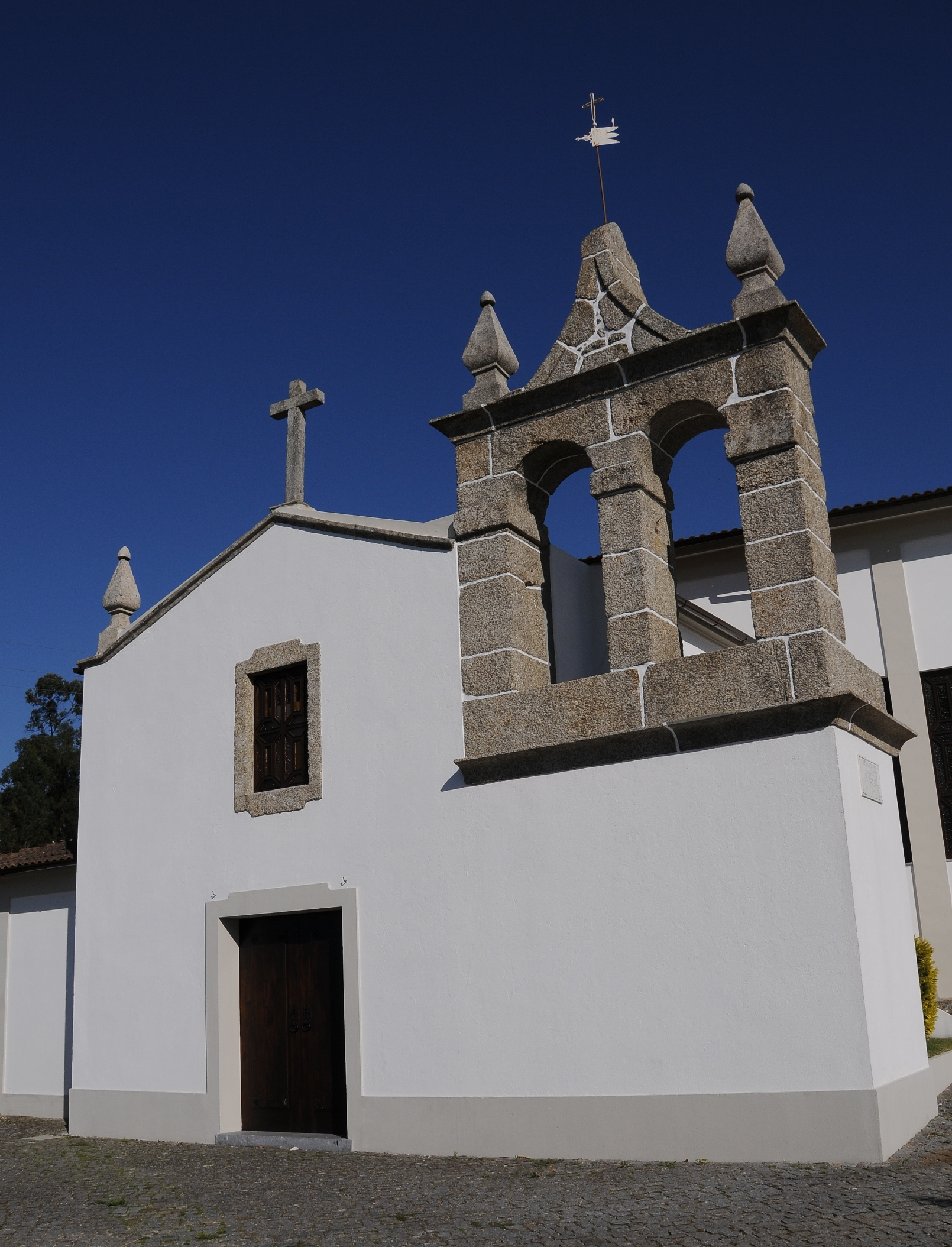
Trandeiras Church
