= Rio Frio e Milhão =

- Civil parish
- Location in Portugal
- Coordinates: 41.76°N 6.63°W
- Country: Portugal
- Region: Norte
- Intermunic. comm.: Terras de Trás-os-Montes
- District: Bragança
- Municipality: Bragança

Area
  - Total: 63.51 km^{2} (24.52 sq mi)

Population (2011)
  - Total: 364
  - Density: 5.73/km^{2} (14.8/sq mi)
- Time zone: UTC+00:00 (WET)
  - Summer (DST): UTC+01:00 (WEST)

Rio Frio e Milhão is a civil parish in the municipality of Bragança, Portugal. It was formed in 2013 by the merger of the former parishes Rio Frio and Milhão. The population in 2011 was 364, in an area of 63.51 km^{2} (24.52 sq mi).
