= Castrelos e Carrazedo =

- Civil parish
- Location in Portugal
- Coordinates: 41.80°N 6.89°W
- Country: Portugal
- Region: Norte
- Intermunic. comm.: Terras de Trás-os-Montes
- District: Bragança
- Municipality: Bragança

Area
  - Total: 50.53 km^{2} (19.51 sq mi)

Population (2011)
  - Total: 241
  - Density: 4.8/km^{2} (12/sq mi)
- Time zone: UTC+00:00 (WET)
  - Summer (DST): UTC+01:00 (WEST)

Castrelos e Carrazedo is a civil parish in the municipality of Bragança, Portugal. It was formed in 2013 by the merger of the former parishes Castrelos and Carrazedo. The population in 2011 was 241, in an area of 50.53 km^{2}.
