= São Julião de Palácios e Deilão =

- Civil parish
- Location in Portugal
- Coordinates: 41.84°N 6.59°W
- Country: Portugal
- Region: Norte
- Intermunic. comm.: Terras de Trás-os-Montes
- District: Bragança
- Municipality: Bragança

Area
  - Total: 80.62 km^{2} (31.13 sq mi)

Population (2011)
  - Total: 400
  - Density: 5.0/km^{2} (13/sq mi)
- Time zone: UTC+00:00 (WET)
  - Summer (DST): UTC+01:00 (WEST)

São Julião de Palácios e Deilão (Portuguese pronunciation: [ˈsɐ̃w̃ ʒuˈljɐ̃w̃ ˈdɨ pɐˈla.sjuʃ ˈi dɐjˈlɐ̃w̃]) (Leonese: San Xulian de Palácius i Deilon, Leonese pronunciation: [ˈs̺ã ʃʊˈljã ˈdi pɐˈla.s̻jʊs̺ ˈi dejˈlõ]) is a civil parish in the municipality of Bragança, Portugal. It was formed in 2013 by the merger of the former parishes São Julião de Palácios and Deilão. The population in 2011 was 400, in an area of 80.62 km^{2}.

== Climate ==
Climate data for Deilão, altitude: 892 m (2,927 ft)
Month	Jan	Feb	Mar	Apr	May	Jun	Jul	Aug	Sep	Oct	Nov	Dec	Year
Average precipitation mm (inches)	103 (4.1)	92 (3.6)	78 (3.1)	71 (2.8)	74 (2.9)	42 (1.7)	18 (0.7)	17 (0.7)	45 (1.8)	83 (3.3)	98 (3.9)	106 (4.2)	827 (32.8)
Source: Portuguese Environment Agency
