= Cabreiros e Passos (São Julião) =

- Civil parish
- Location in Portugal
- Coordinates: 41.541°N 8.492°W
- Country: Portugal
- Region: Norte
- Intermunic. comm.: Cávado
- District: Braga
- Municipality: Braga

Area
  - Total: 4.79 km^{2} (1.85 sq mi)

Population (2011)
  - Total: 2,165
  - Density: 450/km^{2} (1,200/sq mi)
- Time zone: UTC+00:00 (WET)
  - Summer (DST): UTC+01:00 (WEST)

Cabreiros e Passos (São Julião) is a civil parish in the municipality of Braga, Portugal. It was formed in 2013 by the merger of the former parishes Cabreiros and São Julião. The population in 2011 was 2,165, in an area of 4.79 km^{2}.

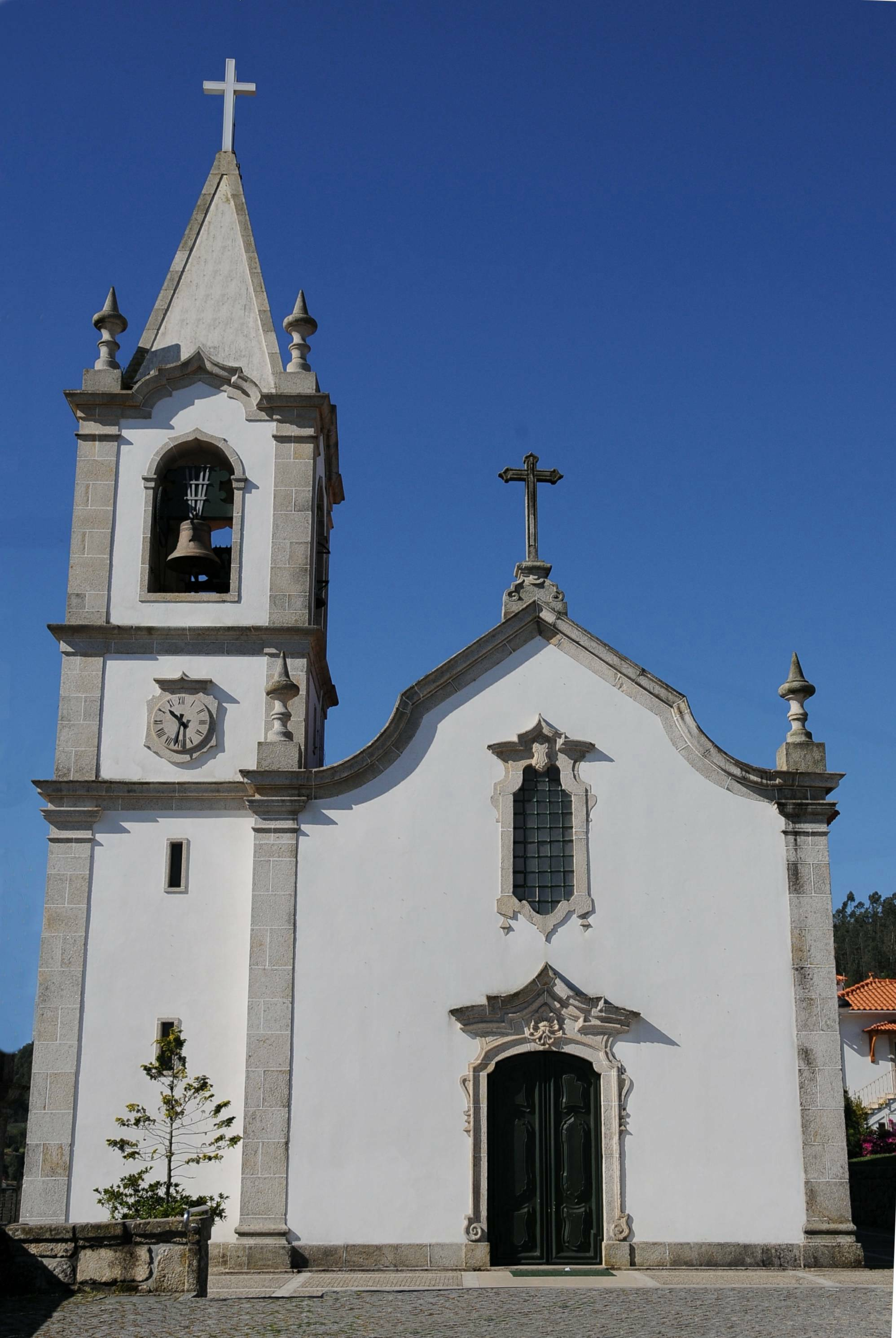
São Juliao de Passos Church
