= Gualtar =

- Civil parish
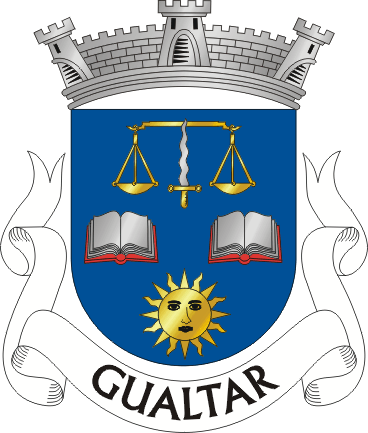
- Coat of arms

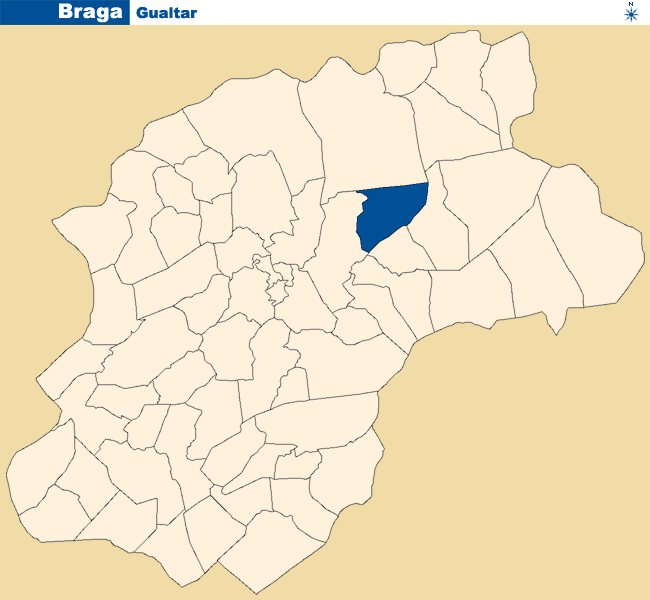
- Coordinates: 41.565°N 8.389°W
- Country: Portugal
- Region: Norte
- Intermunic. comm.: Cávado
- District: Braga
- Municipality: Braga

Area
  - Total: 2.74 km^{2} (1.06 sq mi)

Population (2011)
  - Total: 5,286
  - Density: 1,900/km^{2} (5,000/sq mi)
- Time zone: UTC+00:00 (WET)
  - Summer (DST): UTC+01:00 (WEST)

Gualtar is a Portuguese parish in the municipality of Braga. The population in 2011 was 5,286, in an area of 2.74 km^{2} (1.06 sq mi).

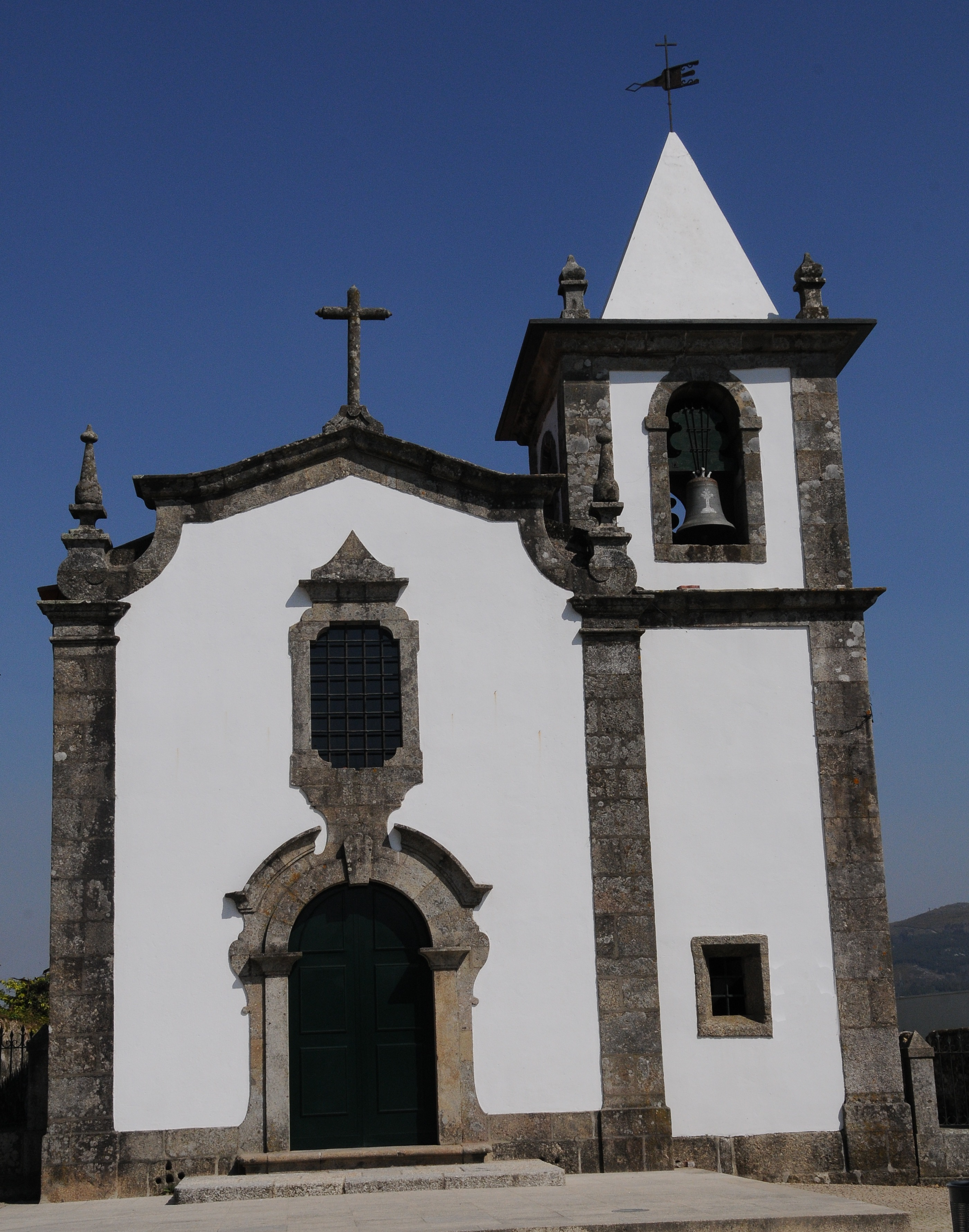
Gualtar Church
