= Crespos e Pousada =

- Civil parish
- Location in Portugal
- Coordinates: 41.605°N 8.362°W
- Country: Portugal
- Region: Norte
- Intermunic. comm.: Cávado
- District: Braga
- Municipality: Braga

Area
  - Total: 7.34 km^{2} (2.83 sq mi)

Population (2011)
  - Total: 1,347
  - Density: 184/km^{2} (475/sq mi)
- Time zone: UTC+00:00 (WET)
  - Summer (DST): UTC+01:00 (WEST)

Crespos e Pousada is a civil parish in the municipality of Braga, Portugal. It was established in 2013 through the merger of the former parishes of Crespos and Pousada. According to the 2011 census, the population was 1,347, living in an area of 7.34 km^{2}.

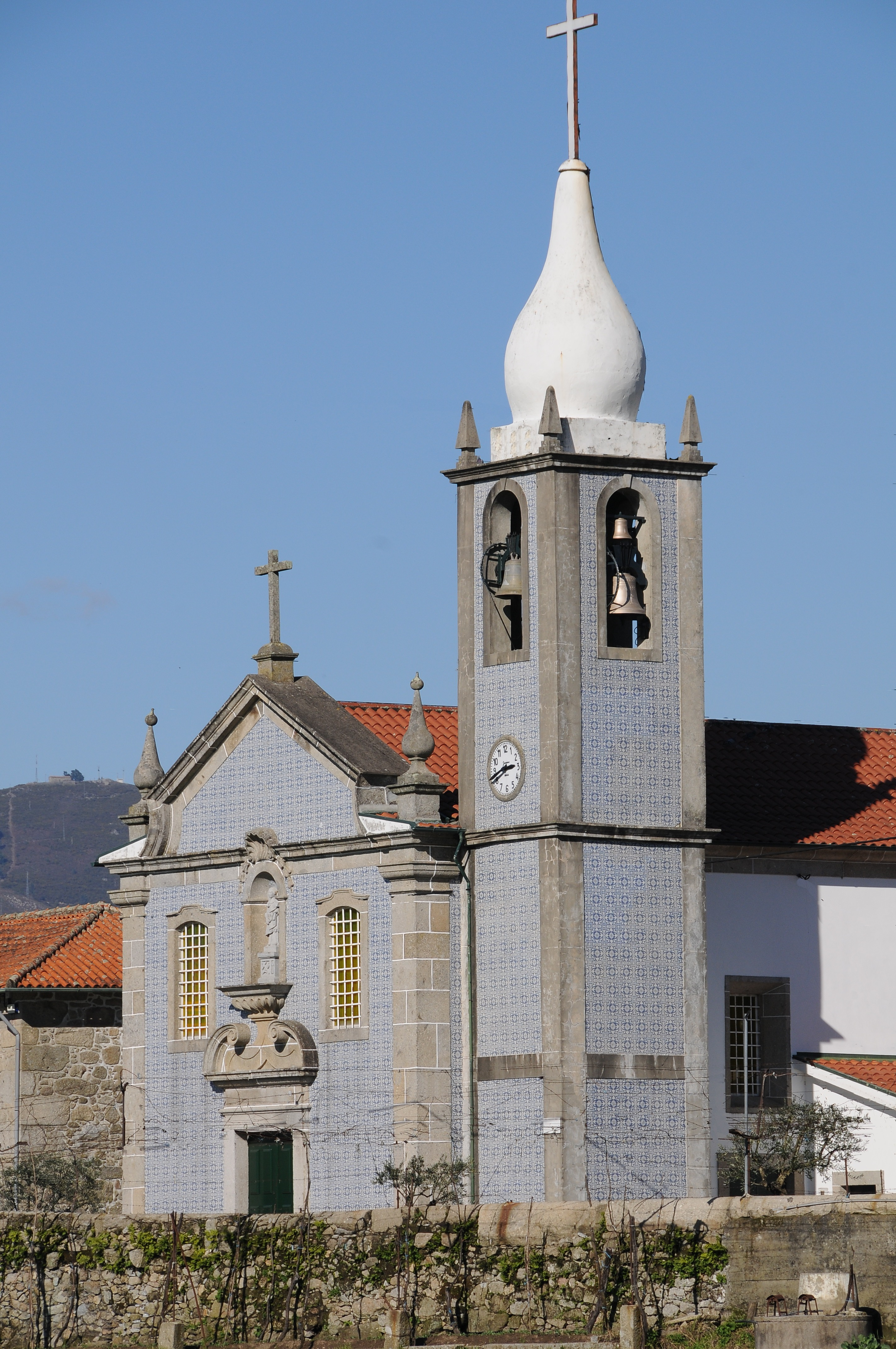
Crespos Church
