= Escudeiros e Penso (Santo Estêvão e São Vicente) =

- Civil parish
- Location in Portugal
- Coordinates: 41.478°N 8.428°W
- Country: Portugal
- Region: Norte
- Intermunic. comm.: Cávado
- District: Braga
- Municipality: Braga

Area
  - Total: 8.04 km^{2} (3.10 sq mi)

Population (2011)
  - Total: 1,864
  - Density: 230/km^{2} (600/sq mi)
- Time zone: UTC+00:00 (WET)
  - Summer (DST): UTC+01:00 (WEST)

Escudeiros e Penso (Santo Estêvão e São Vicente) is a civil parish in the municipality of Braga, Portugal. It was formed in 2013 by the merger of the former parishes Escudeiros, Santo Estêvão and São Vicente. The population in 2011 was 1,864, in an area of 8.04 km^{2}.

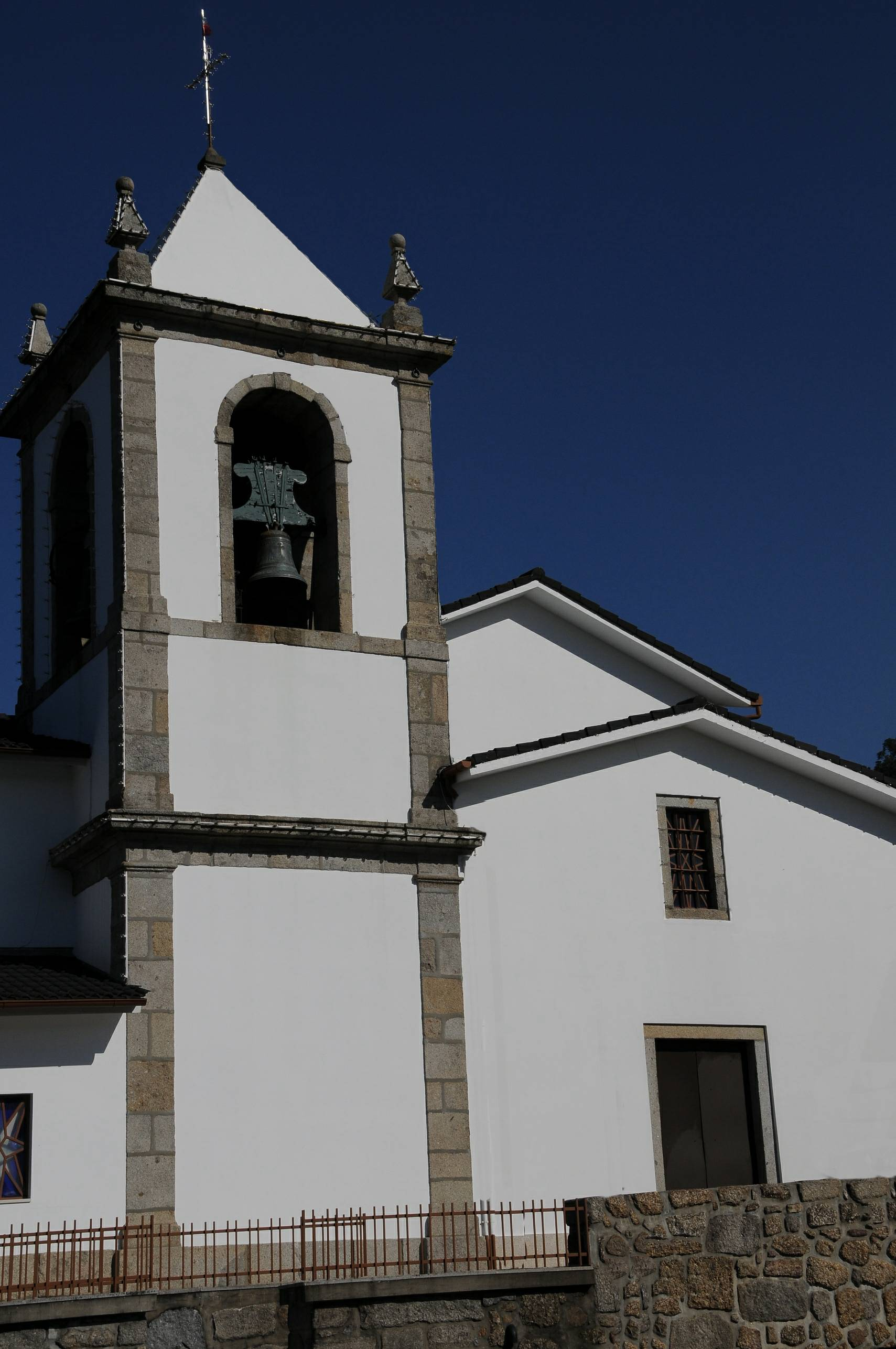
Escudeiros Church

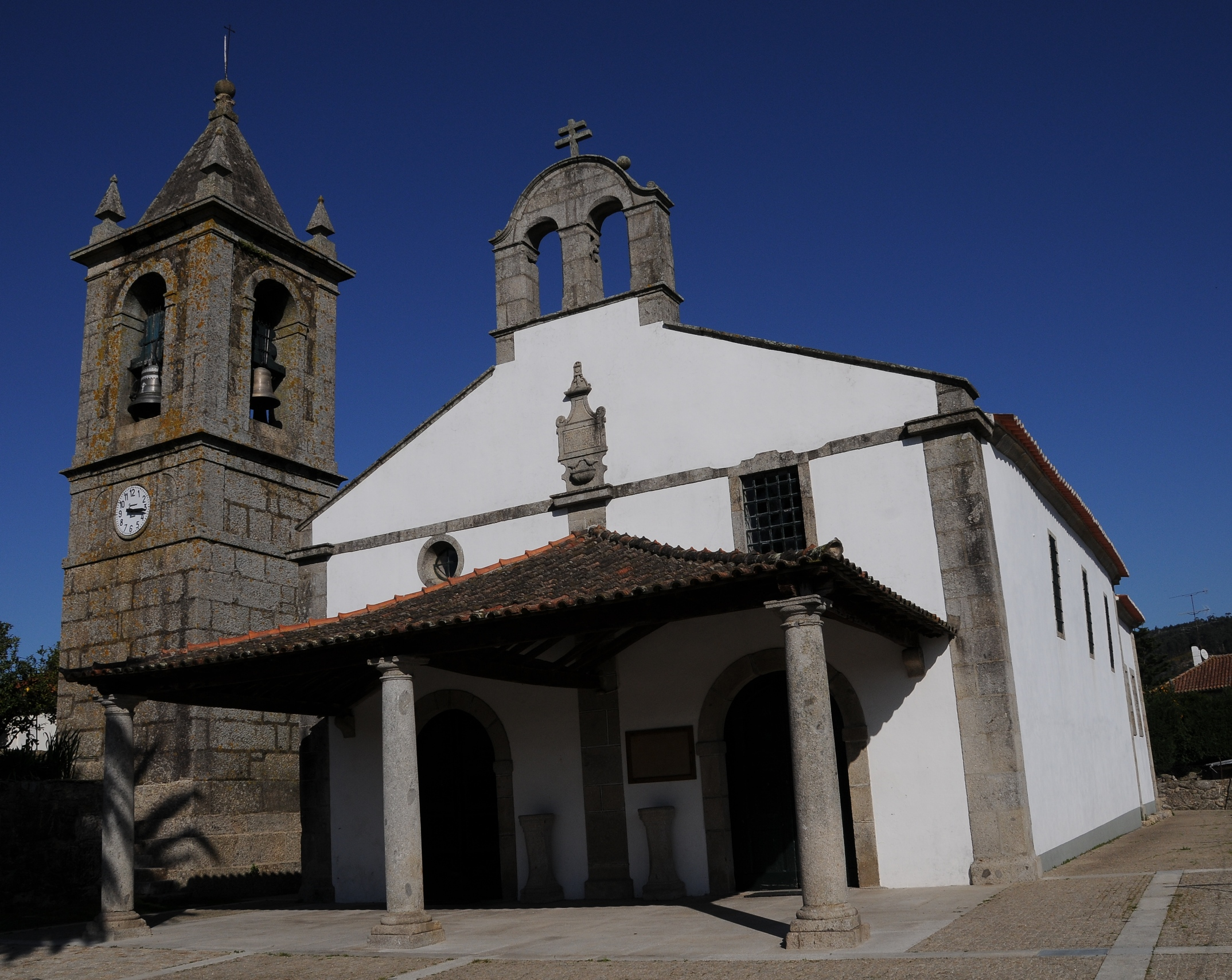
Santo Estevao de Penso Church

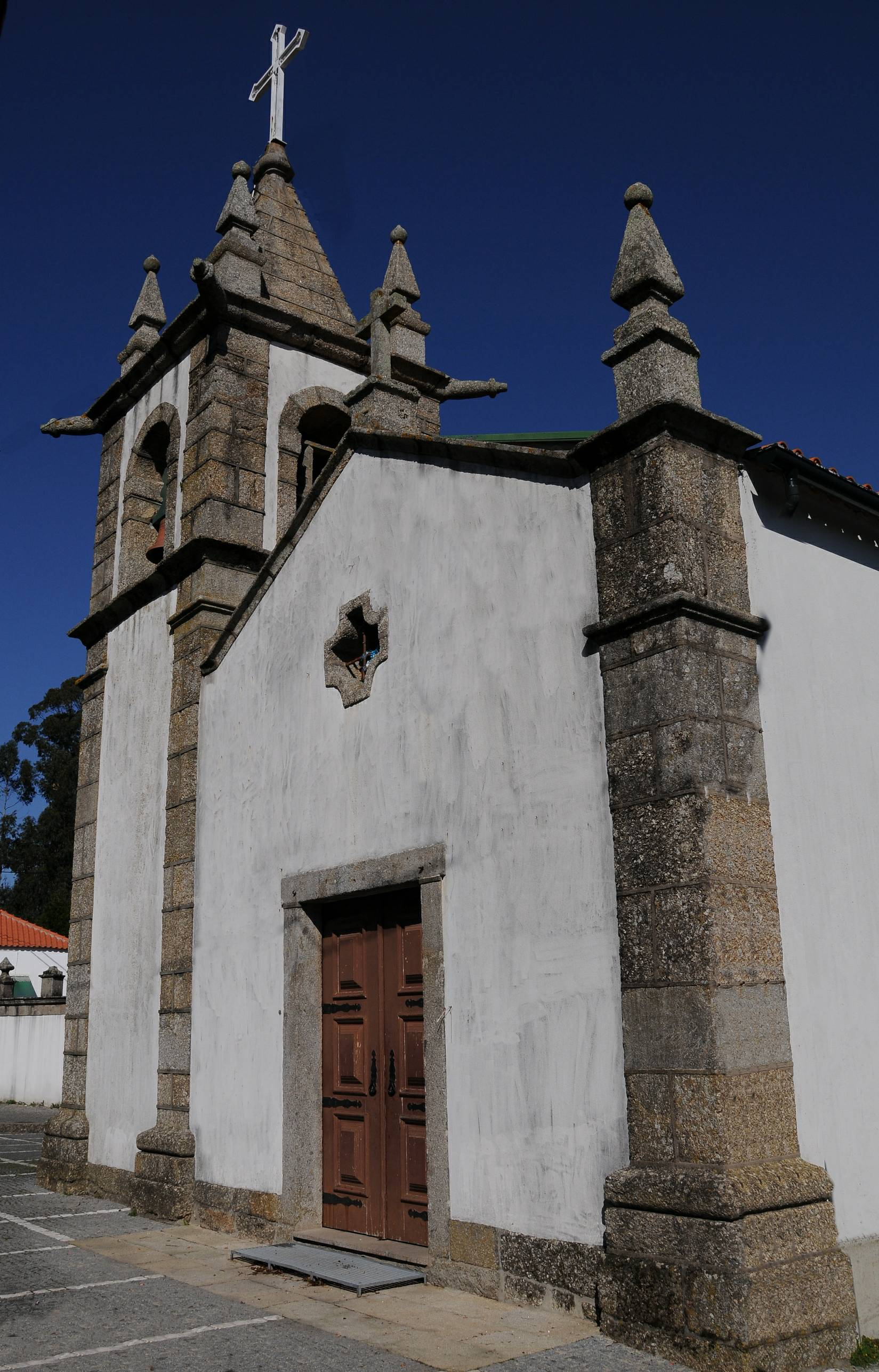
São Vicente do Penso Church
