= Pedralva (Braga) =

- Civil parish
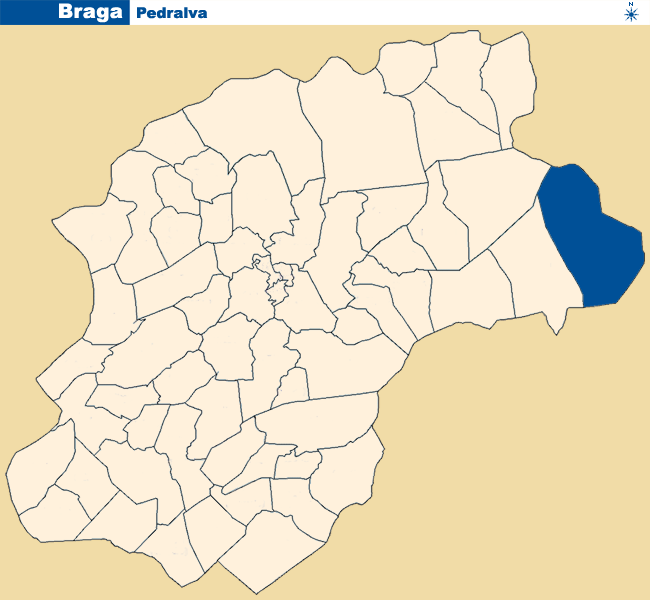
- Coordinates: 41.560°N 8.319°W
- Country: Portugal
- Region: Norte
- Intermunic. comm.: Cávado
- District: Braga
- Municipality: Braga

Area
  - Total: 8.07 km^{2} (3.12 sq mi)

Population (2011)
  - Total: 1,110
  - Density: 138/km^{2} (356/sq mi)
- Time zone: UTC+00:00 (WET)
  - Summer (DST): UTC+01:00 (WEST)

Pedralva is a Portuguese parish, located in the municipality of Braga. The population in 2011 was 1,110, in an area of 8.07 km^{2} (3.12 sq mi).

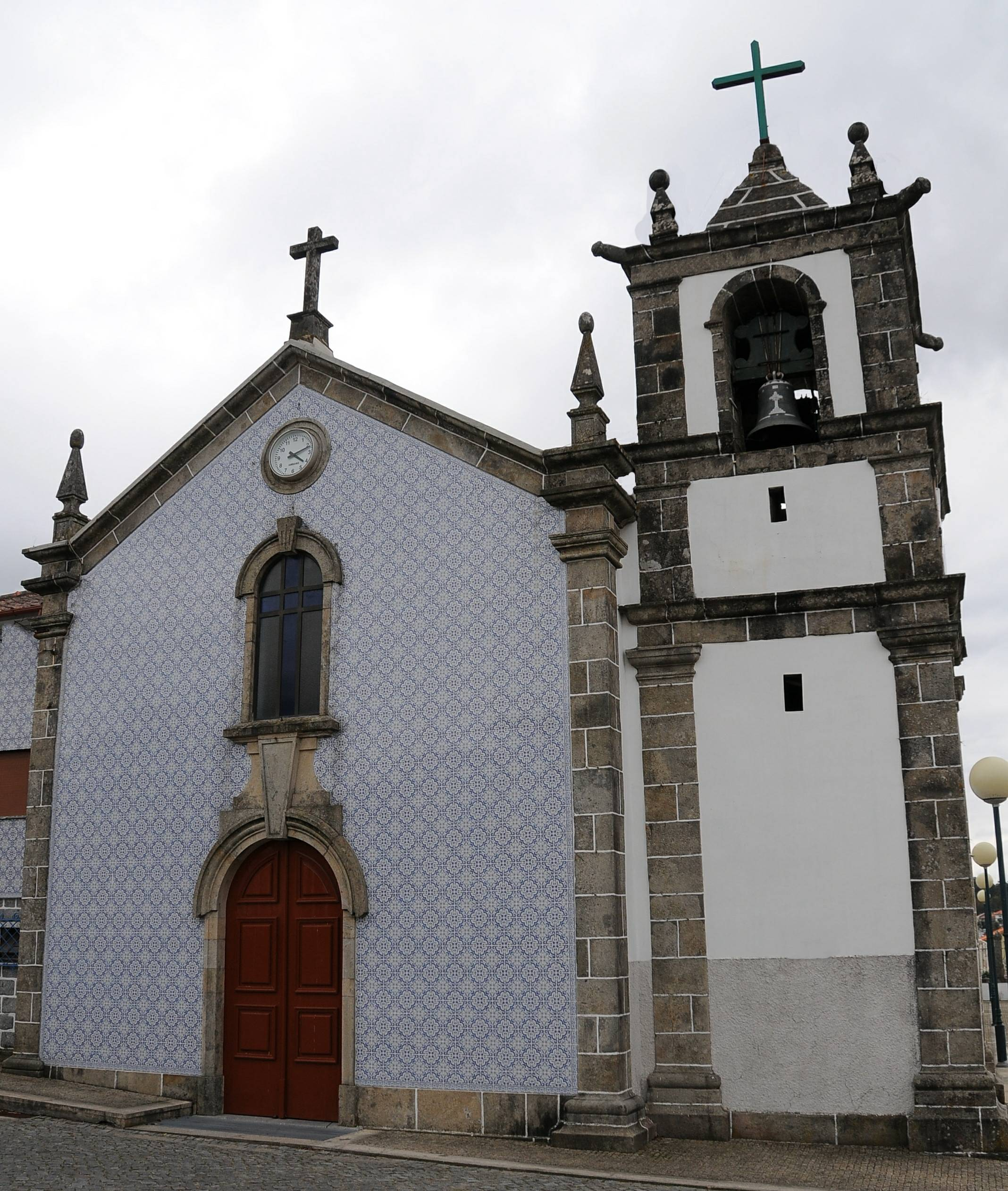
Pedralva Church
