= Vilaça e Fradelos =

- Civil parish
- Location in Portugal
- Coordinates: 41.517°N 8.476°W
- Country: Portugal
- Region: Norte
- Intermunic. comm.: Cávado
- District: Braga
- Municipality: Braga

Area
  - Total: 2.80 km^{2} (1.08 sq mi)

Population (2011)
  - Total: 1,580
  - Density: 564/km^{2} (1,460/sq mi)
- Time zone: UTC+00:00 (WET)
  - Summer (DST): UTC+01:00 (WEST)

Vilaça e Fradelos is a civil parish in the municipality of Braga, Portugal. It was formed in 2013 by the merger of the former parishes Vilaça and Fradelos. The population in 2011 was 1,580, in an area of 2.80 km^{2} (1.08 sq mi).

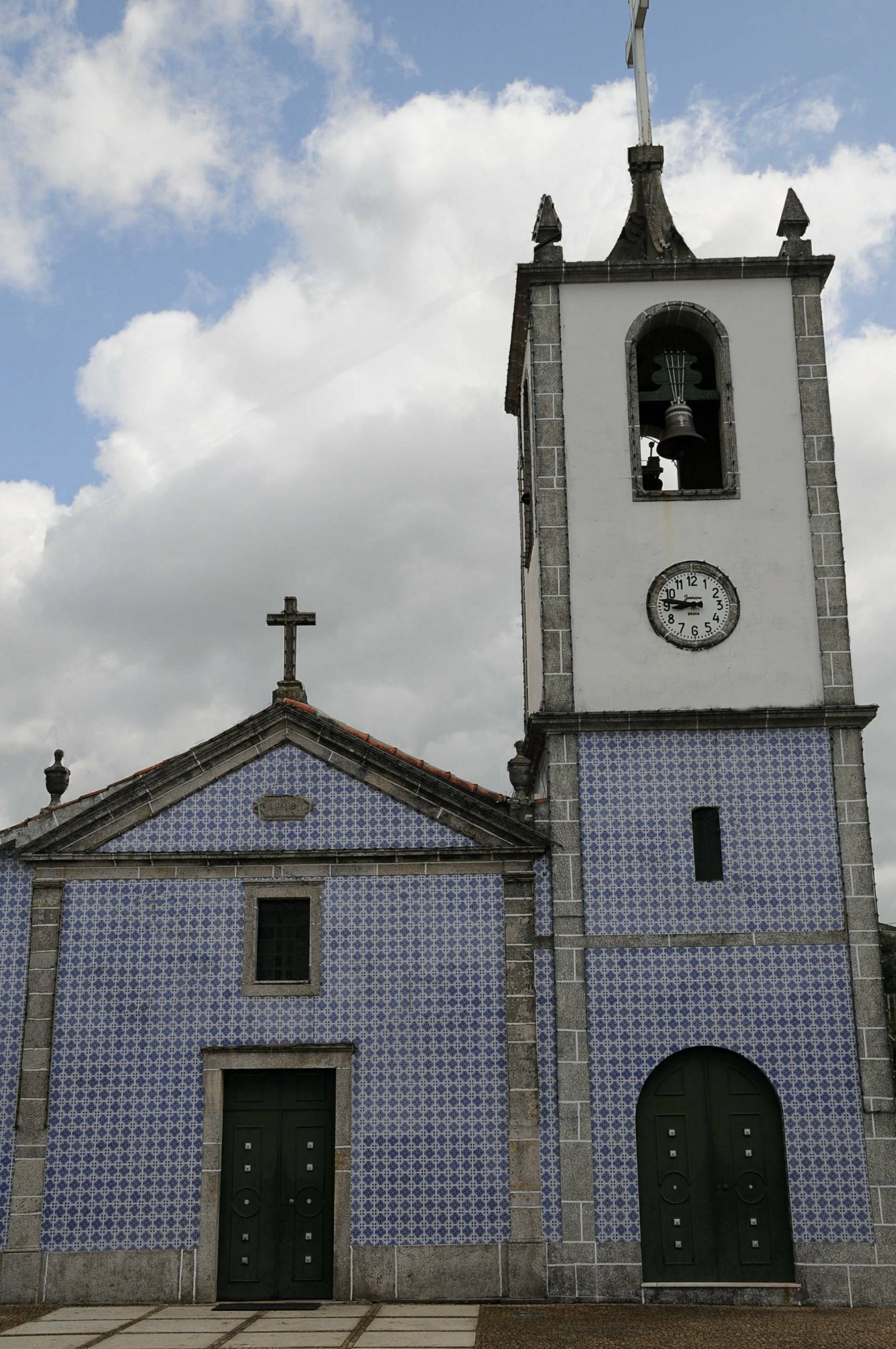
Vilaça Church

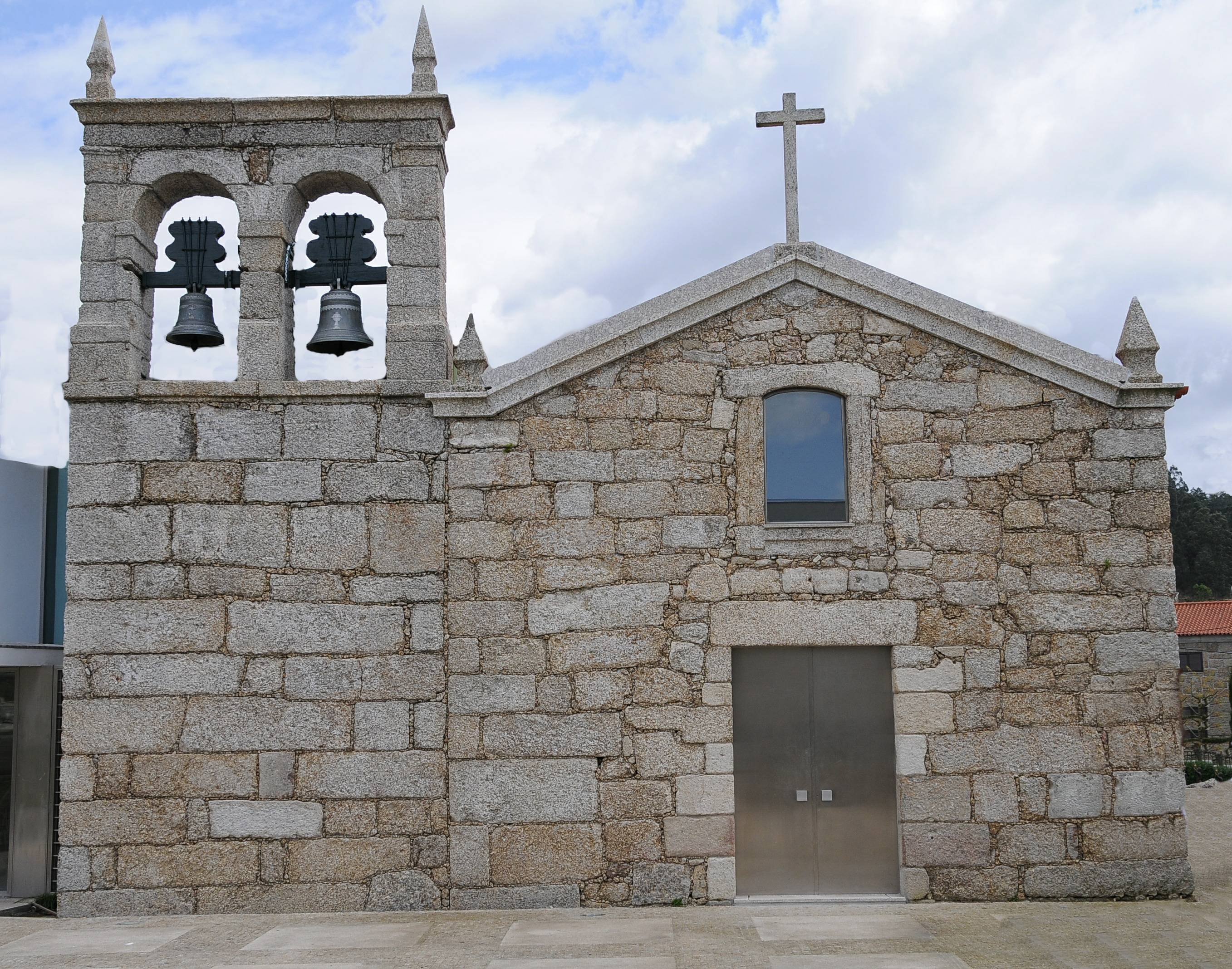
Fradelos Church
