= Negreiros =

- Almada Negreiros (1893–1970), Portuguese artist
- André Vidal de Negreiros, (1606–1680), Portuguese colonial governor and military man
- António Lobo de Almada Negreiros, journalist and colonialist writer, essayist and poet
- Armando Negreiros, Brazilian swimmer
- Luis Negreiros, Peruvian sociologist and politician
- Walter Ferraz de Negreiros (born 1946), Brazilian footballer
