= Esporões =

- Civil parish
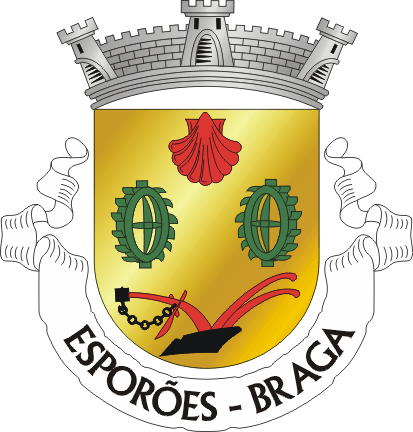
- Coat of arms

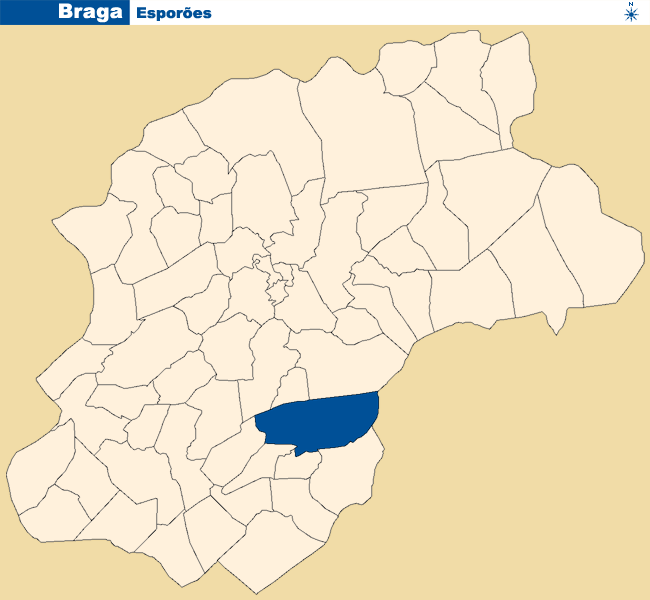
- Coordinates: 41.511°N 8.419°W
- Country: Portugal
- Region: Norte
- Intermunic. comm.: Cávado
- District: Braga
- Municipality: Braga

Area
  - Total: 4.74 km^{2} (1.83 sq mi)

Population (2011)
  - Total: 1,709
  - Density: 361/km^{2} (934/sq mi)
- Time zone: UTC+00:00 (WET)
  - Summer (DST): UTC+01:00 (WEST)

Esporões is a Portuguese freguesia ("civil parish"), located in the municipality of Braga. The population in 2011 was 1,709, in an area of 4.74 km^{2} (1.83 sq mi).

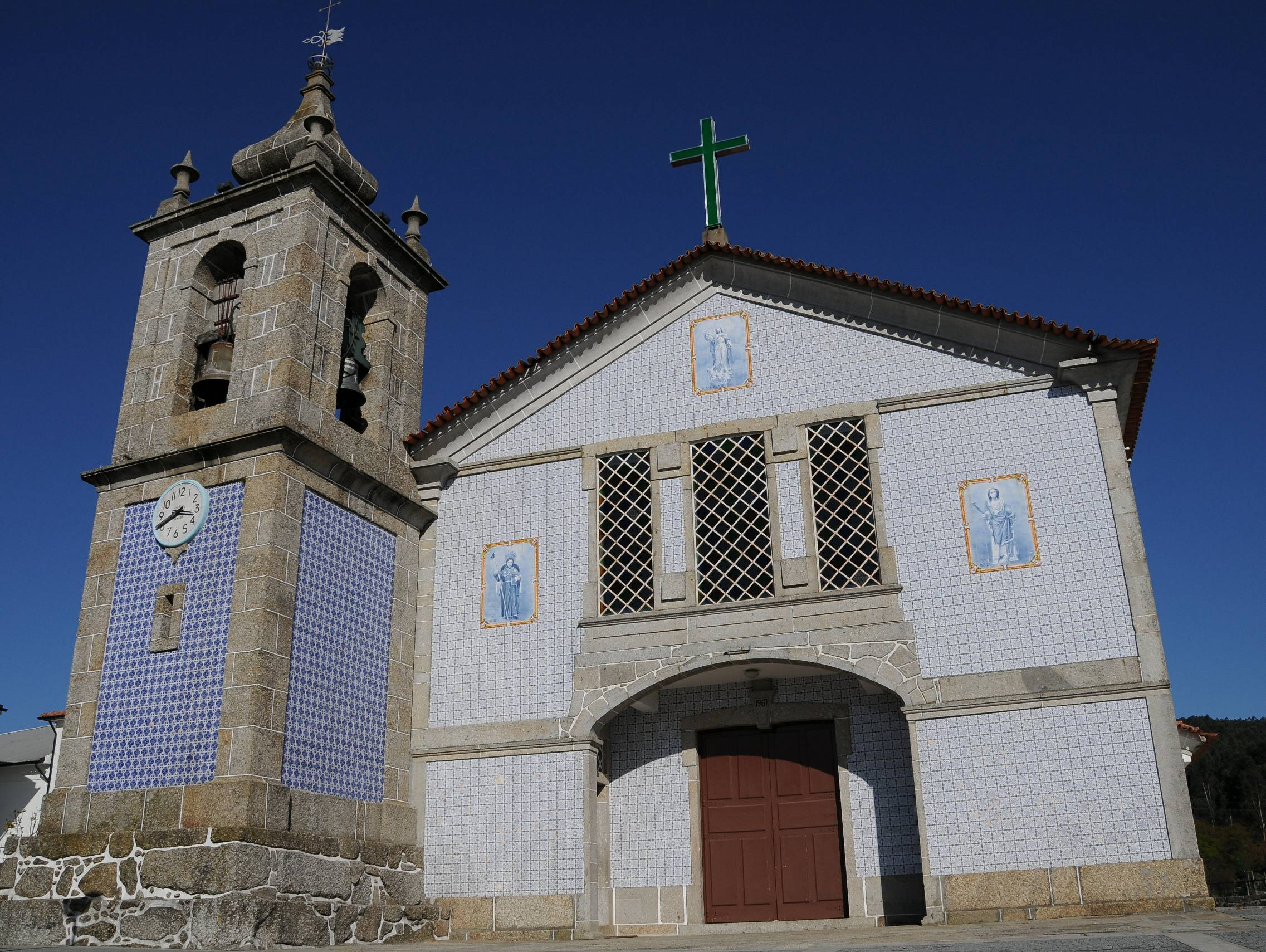
Esporões Church
