= Ferreiros e Gondizalves =

- Civil parish
- Location in Portugal
- Coordinates: 41.536°N 8.440°W
- Country: Portugal
- Region: Norte
- Intermunic. comm.: Cávado
- District: Braga
- Municipality: Braga

Area
  - Total: 4.26 km^{2} (1.64 sq mi)

Population (2011)
  - Total: 9,148
  - Density: 2,100/km^{2} (5,600/sq mi)
- Time zone: UTC+00:00 (WET)
  - Summer (DST): UTC+01:00 (WEST)

Ferreiros e Gondizalves is a civil parish in the municipality of Braga, Portugal. It was formed in 2013 by the merger of the former parishes Ferreiros and Gondizalves. The population in 2011 was 9,148, in an area of 4.26 km^{2}.

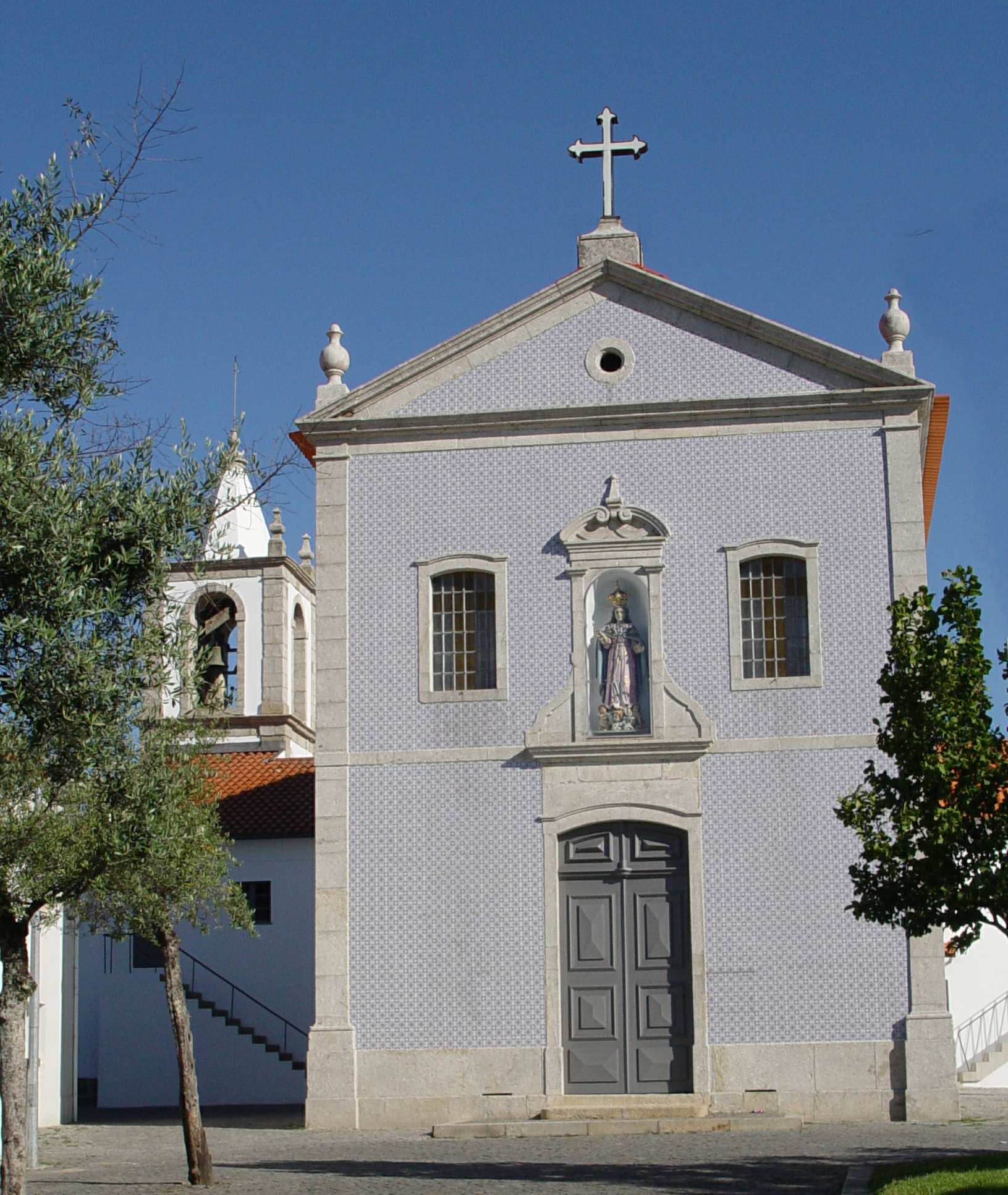
Ferreiros Church

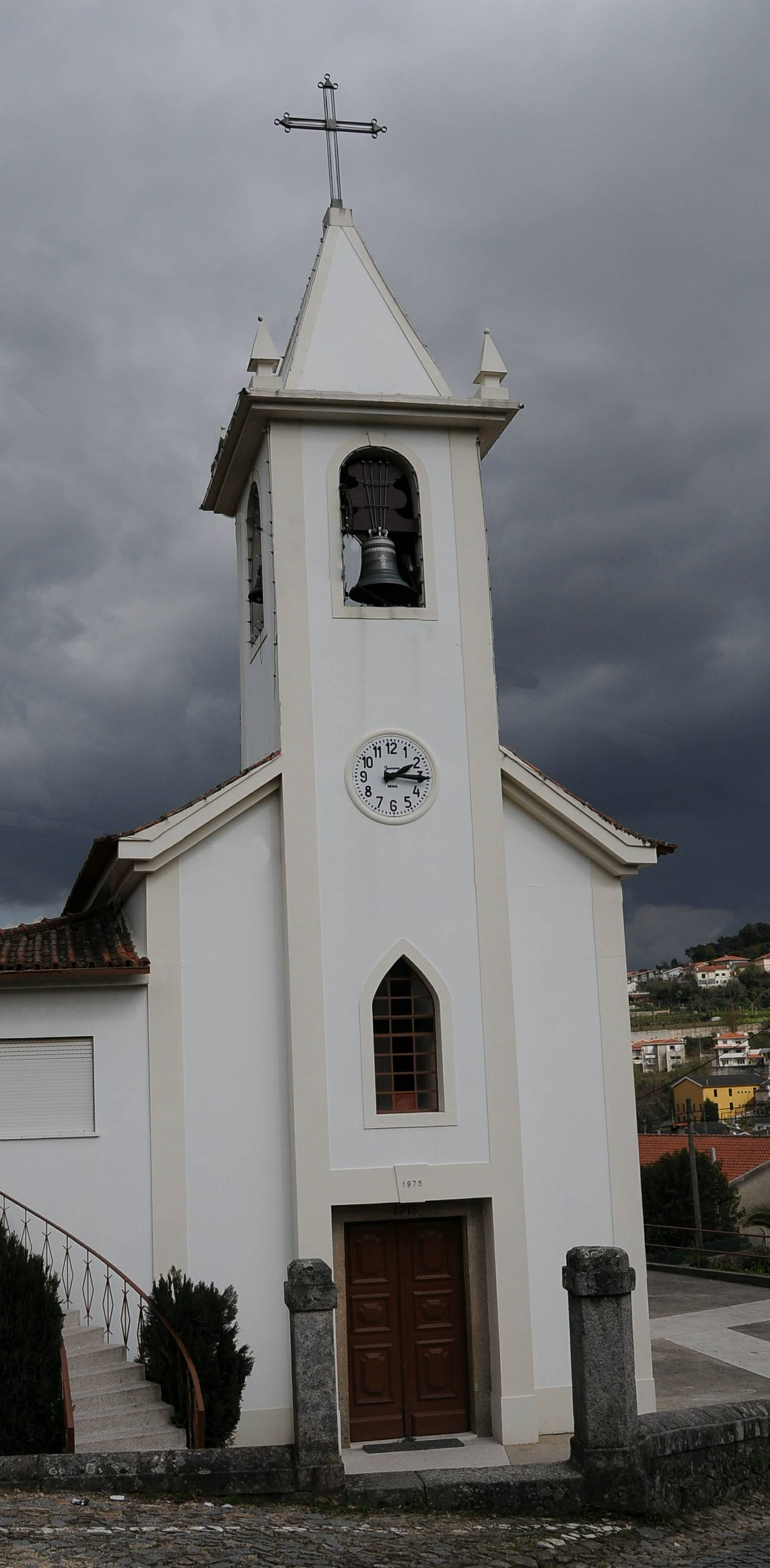
Gondizalves Church
