= Sobreposta =

- Civil parish
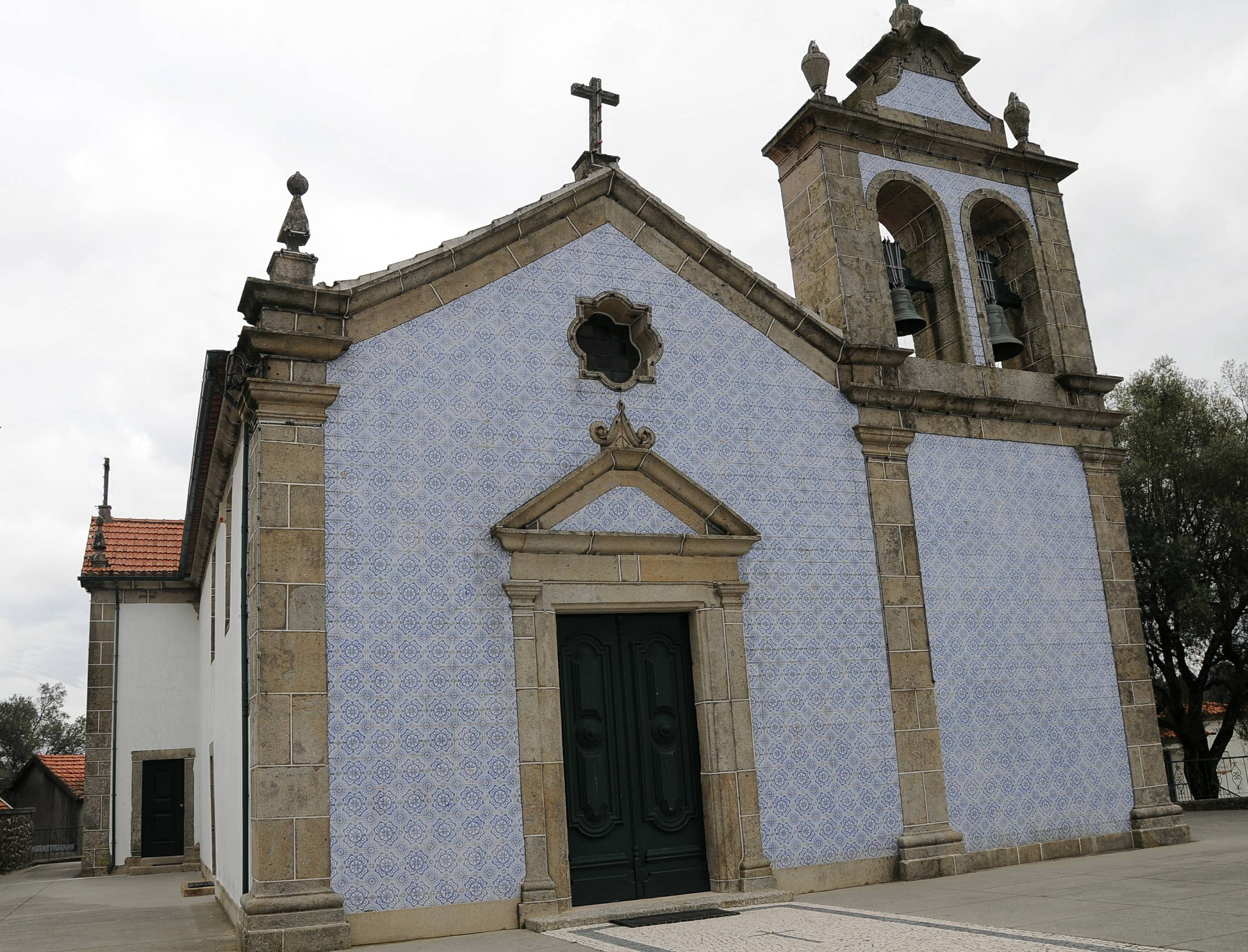

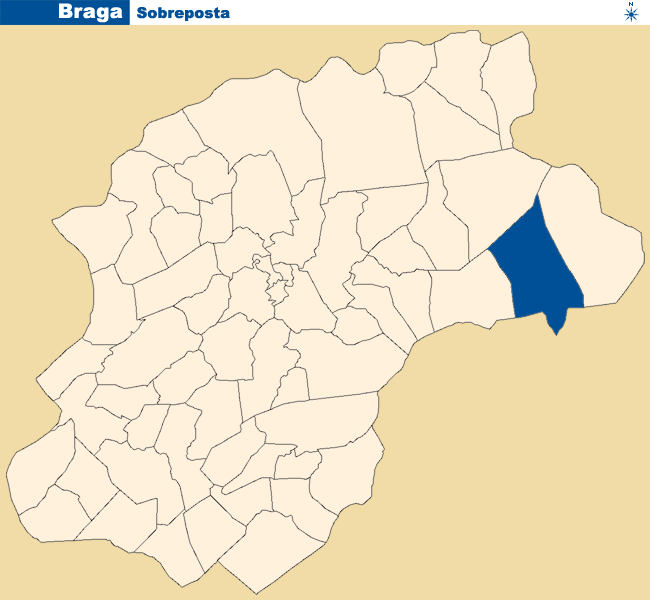
- Coordinates: 41.556°N 8.340°W
- Country: Portugal
- Region: Norte
- Intermunic. comm.: Cávado
- District: Braga
- Municipality: Braga

Area
  - Total: 5.98 km^{2} (2.31 sq mi)

Population (2011)
  - Total: 1,301
  - Density: 218/km^{2} (563/sq mi)
- Time zone: UTC+00:00 (WET)
  - Summer (DST): UTC+01:00 (WEST)

Sobreposta is a Portuguese parish in the municipality of Braga. The population in 2011 was 1,301, in an area of 5.98 km^{2}.

== History ==
Tradition hold that the name Sobreposta comes from the fact that in Monte da Pena, ten stones were superimposed. The oldest document mentioning Sobreposta dates to 1134, referred as Lageosa, which was the name of the autonomous parish. In the 18th century Lageosa was merged with Sobreposta. Between 1840 and 1855 Sobreposta belonged under the jurisdiction of Póvoa de Lanhoso municipality.

== Buildings ==
- St Tomé Chapel, founded in 1737
- Parochial church
- Sun Clock
- Alagoa Necropolis
- Porteguiz Mills
