= Monte de Fralães =

- Civil parish
- Location in Portugal
- Coordinates: 41.458°N 8.567°W
- Country: Portugal
- Region: Norte
- Intermunic. comm.: Cávado
- District: Braga
- Municipality: Barcelos
- Disbanded: 2013

Area
  - Total: 1.58 km^{2} (0.61 sq mi)

Population (2011)
  - Total: 408
  - Density: 260/km^{2} (670/sq mi)
- Time zone: UTC+00:00 (WET)
  - Summer (DST): UTC+01:00 (WEST)

Monte de Fralães is a former civil parish, located in the municipality of Barcelos, Portugal. In 2013, the parish merged into the new parish Viatodos, Grimancelos, Minhotães e Monte de Fralães. The population in 2011 was 408, in an area of 1.58 km².
