= Silveiros e Rio Covo (Santa Eulália) =

- Civil parish
- Location in Portugal
- Coordinates: 41.469°N 8.574°W
- Country: Portugal
- Region: Norte
- Intermunic. comm.: Cávado
- District: Braga
- Municipality: Barcelos

Area
  - Total: 8.23 km^{2} (3.18 sq mi)

Population (2011)
  - Total: 2,151
  - Density: 261/km^{2} (677/sq mi)
- Time zone: UTC+00:00 (WET)
  - Summer (DST): UTC+01:00 (WEST)

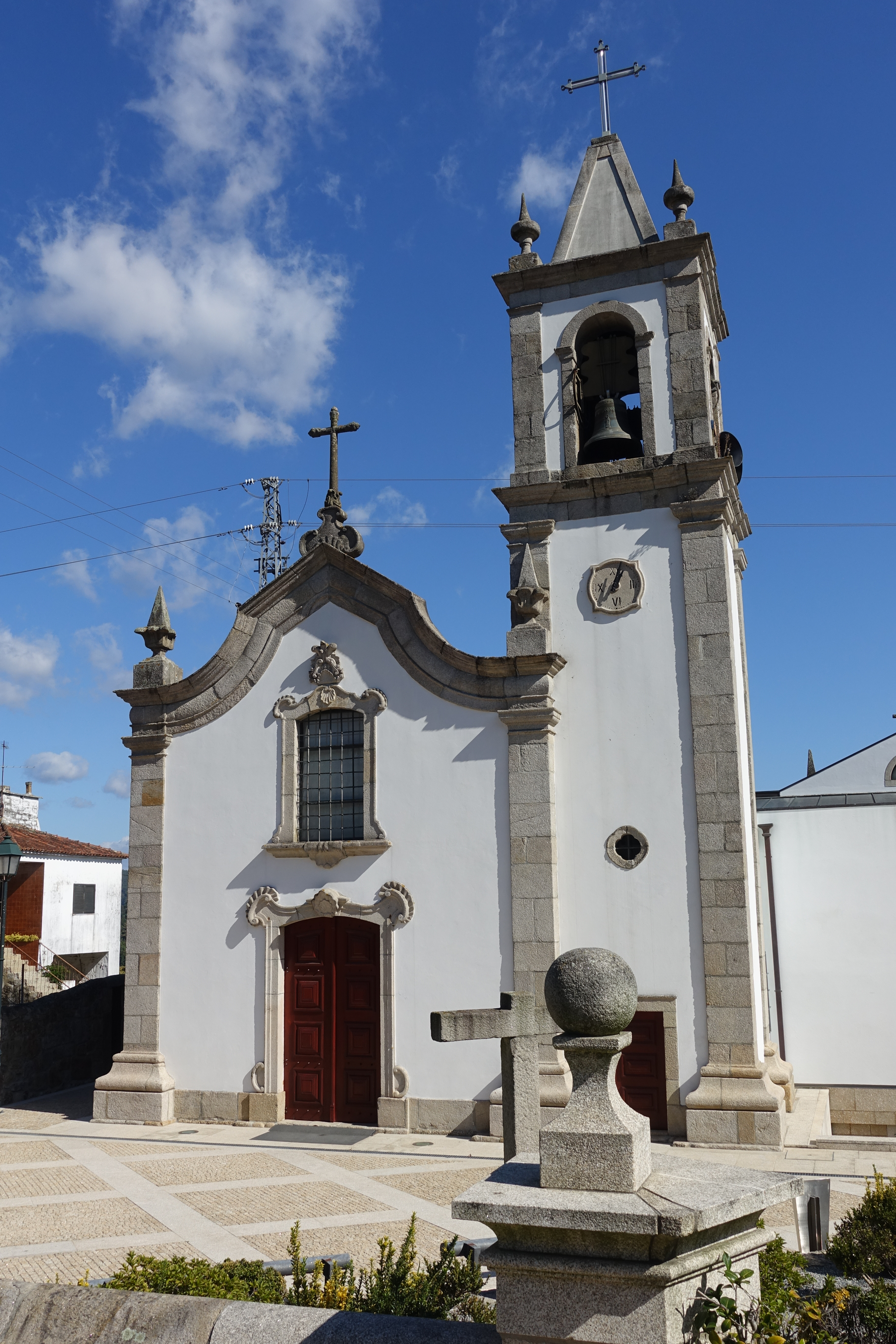

Silveiros e Rio Covo (Santa Eulália) is a civil parish in the municipality of Barcelos, Portugal. It was formed in 2013 by the merger of the former parishes Silveiros and Rio Covo (Santa Eulália). The population in 2011 was 2,151, in an area of 8.23 km^{2} (3.18 sq mi).
