= Chorente, Góios, Courel, Pedra Furada e Gueral =

- Civil parish
- Location in Portugal
- Coordinates: 41.457°N 8.613°W
- Country: Portugal
- Region: Norte
- Intermunic. comm.: Cávado
- District: Braga
- Municipality: Barcelos

Area
  - Total: 16.09 km^{2} (6.21 sq mi)

Population (2011)
  - Total: 2,568
  - Density: 159.6/km^{2} (413.4/sq mi)
- Time zone: UTC+00:00 (WET)
  - Summer (DST): UTC+01:00 (WEST)

Chorente, Góios, Courel, Pedra Furada e Gueral is a civil parish in the municipality of Barcelos, Portugal. It was formed in 2013 by the merger of the former parishes Chorente, Góios, Courel, Pedra Furada and Gueral. The population in 2011 was 2,568, in an area of 16.09 km^{2} (6.21 sq mi).
