= Santa Lucrécia de Algeriz e Navarra =

- Civil parish
- Location in Portugal
- Coordinates: 41.594°N 8.372°W
- Country: Portugal
- Region: Norte
- Intermunic. comm.: Cávado
- District: Braga
- Municipality: Braga

Area
  - Total: 6.22 km^{2} (2.40 sq mi)

Population (2011)
  - Total: 994
  - Density: 160/km^{2} (410/sq mi)
- Time zone: UTC+00:00 (WET)
  - Summer (DST): UTC+01:00 (WEST)

Santa Lucrécia de Algeriz e Navarra is a civil parish in the municipality of Braga, Portugal. It was formed in 2013 by the merger of the former parishes Santa Lucrécia de Algeriz and Navarra. The population in 2011 was 994, in an area of 6.22 km^{2}.

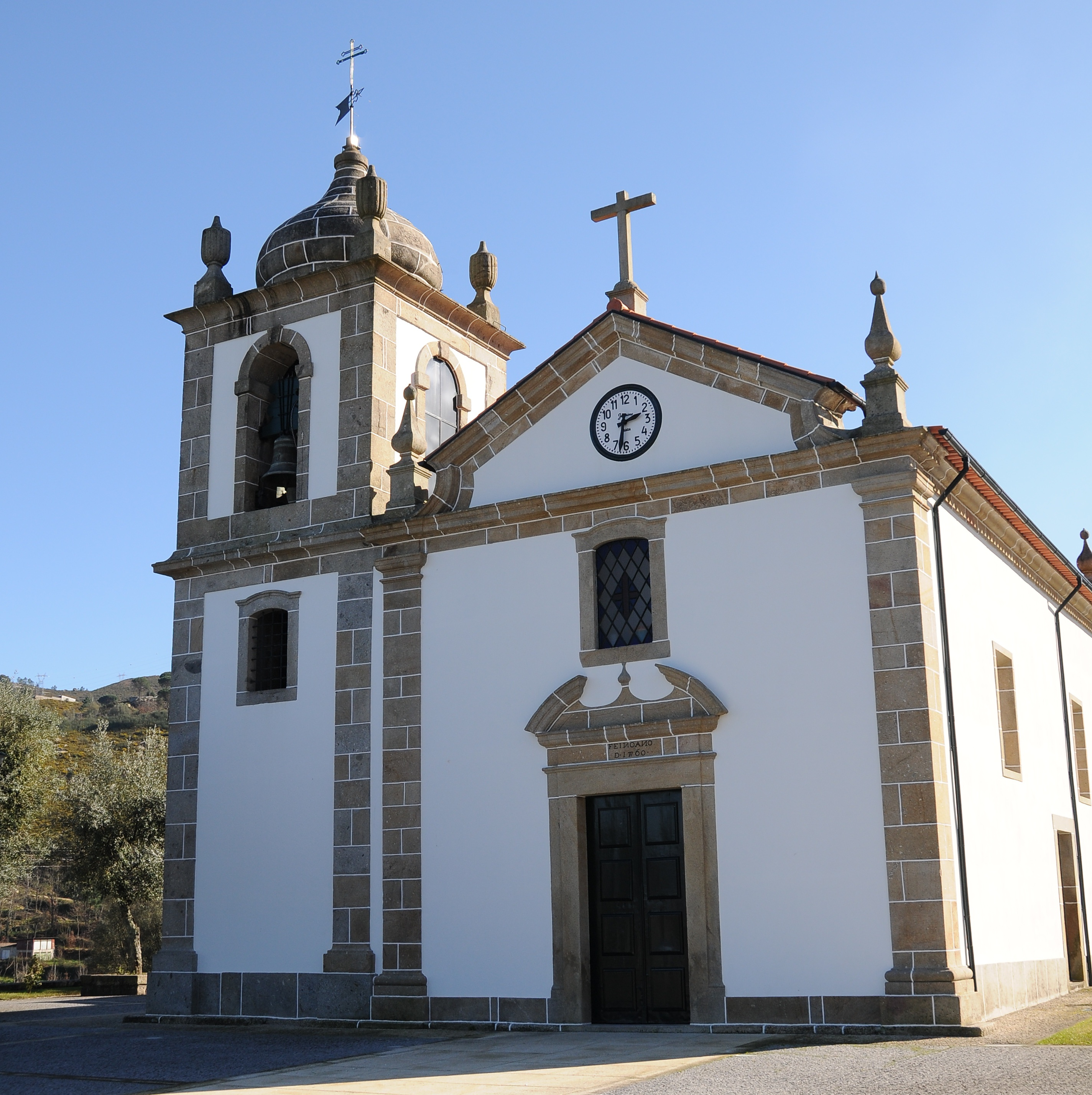
Santa Lucrécia de Algeriz Church

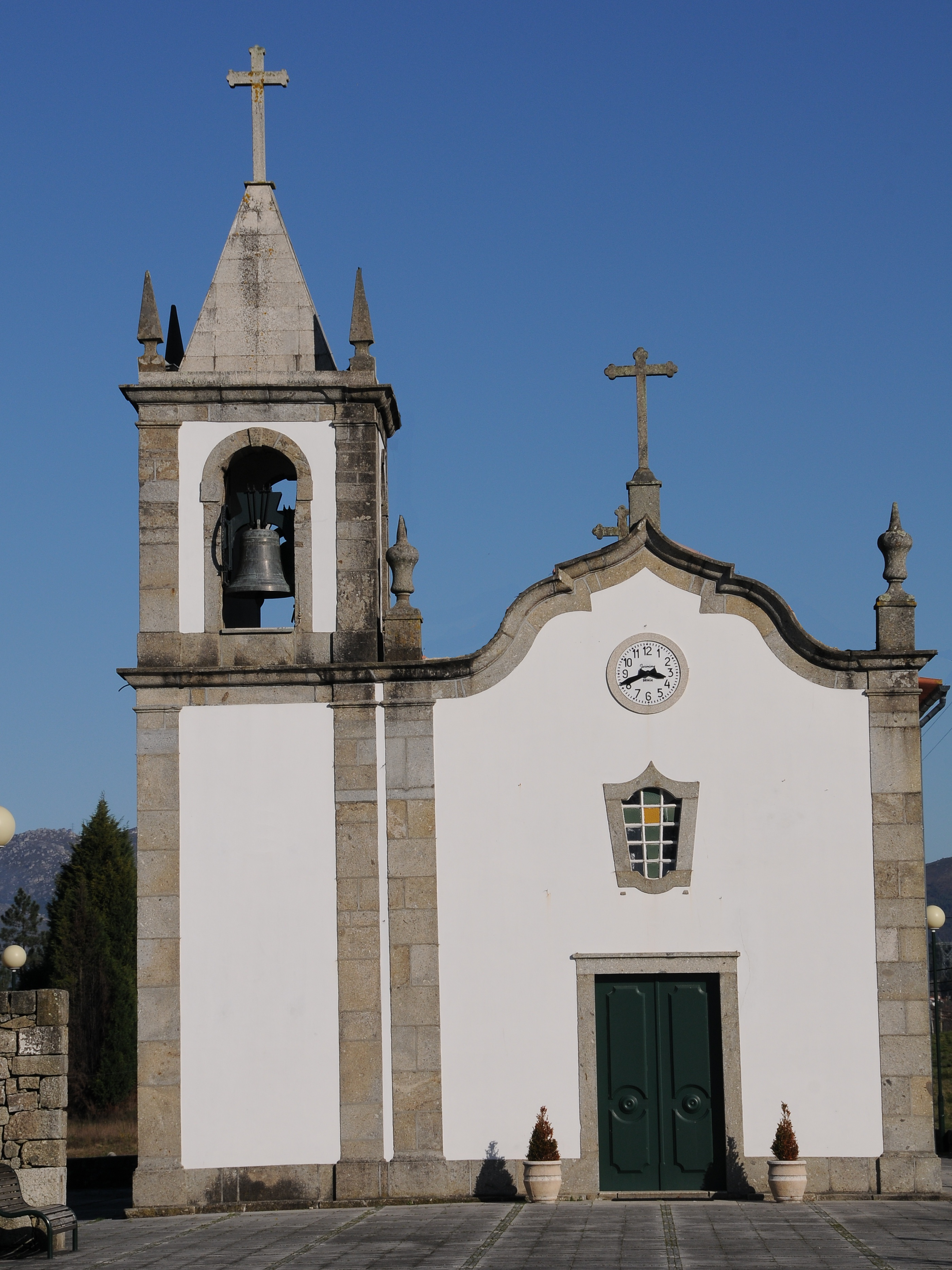
Navarra Church
