= Areias de Vilar e Encourados =

- Civil parish
- Location in Portugal
- Coordinates: 41.533°N 8.550°W
- Country: Portugal
- Region: Norte
- Intermunic. comm.: Cávado
- District: Braga
- Municipality: Barcelos

Area
  - Total: 10.17 km^{2} (3.93 sq mi)

Population (2011)
  - Total: 1,879
  - Density: 184.8/km^{2} (478.5/sq mi)
- Time zone: UTC+00:00 (WET)
  - Summer (DST): UTC+01:00 (WEST)

Areias de Vilar e Encourados is a civil parish in the municipality of Barcelos, Portugal. It was formed in 2013 by the merger of the former parishes Areias de Vilar and Encourados. The population in 2011 was 1,879, in an area of 10.17 km^{2} (3.93 sq mi).
