= Ruilhe =

- Civil parish
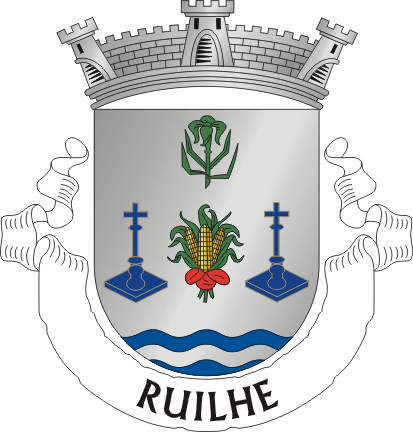
- Coat of arms

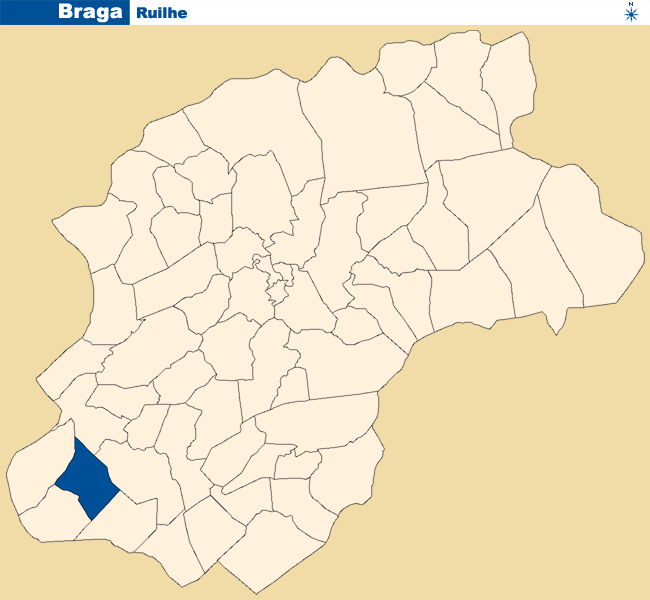
- Coordinates: 41.499°N 8.500°W
- Country: Portugal
- Region: Norte
- Intermunic. comm.: Cávado
- District: Braga
- Municipality: Braga

Area
  - Total: 2.20 km^{2} (0.85 sq mi)

Population (2011)
  - Total: 1,142
  - Density: 519/km^{2} (1,340/sq mi)
- Time zone: UTC+00:00 (WET)
  - Summer (DST): UTC+01:00 (WEST)

Ruilhe is a Portuguese parish, located in the municipality of Braga. The population in 2011 was 1,142, in an area of 2.20 km^{2} (0.85 sq mi).

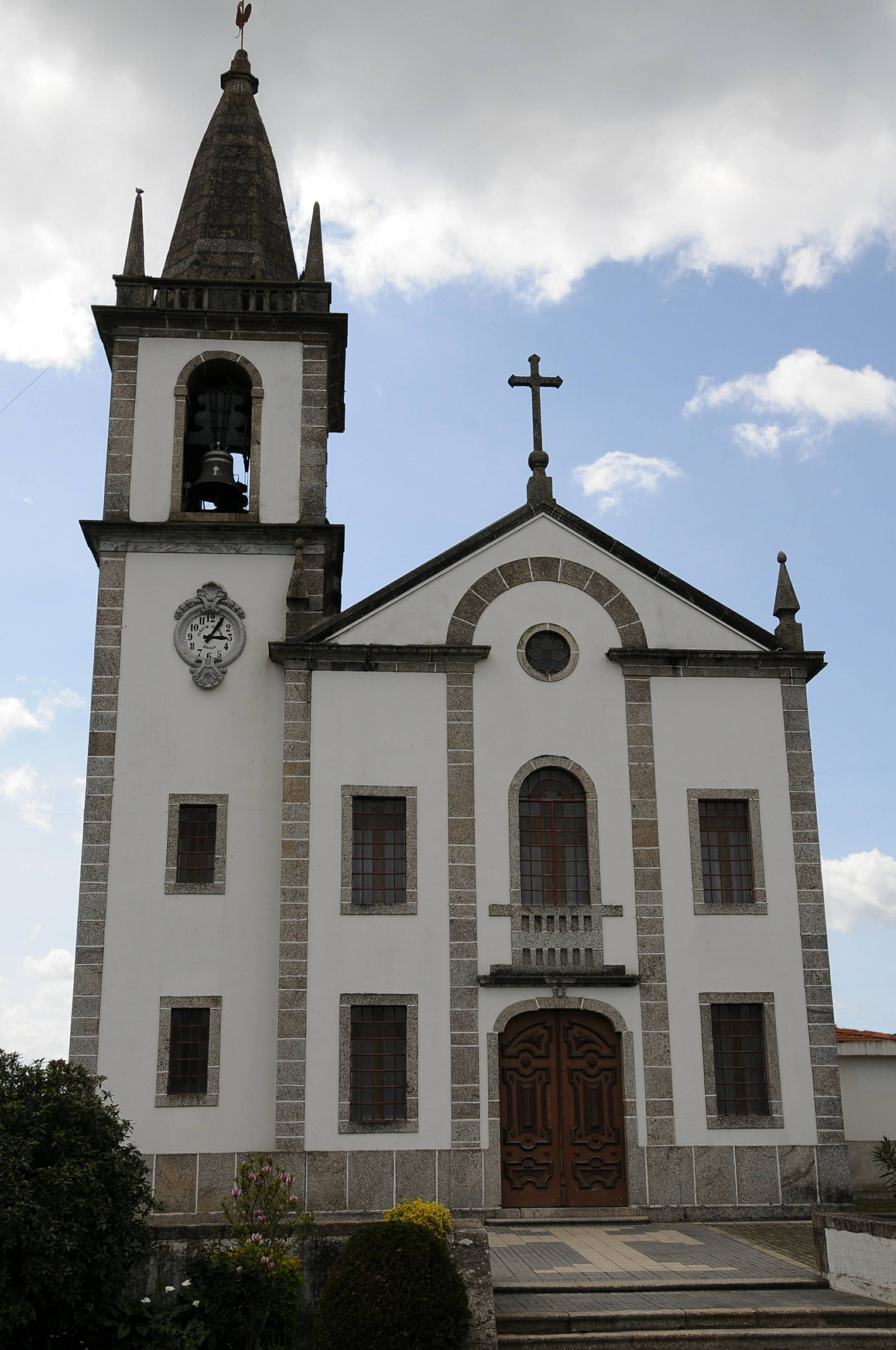
Ruilhe Church
