= Alvito (São Pedro e São Martinho) e Couto =

- Civil parish
- Location in Portugal
- Coordinates: 41.601°N 8.592°W
- Country: Portugal
- Region: Norte
- Intermunic. comm.: Cávado
- District: Braga
- Municipality: Barcelos

Area
  - Total: 8.54 km^{2} (3.30 sq mi)

Population (2011)
  - Total: 1,438
  - Density: 168/km^{2} (436/sq mi)
- Time zone: UTC+00:00 (WET)
  - Summer (DST): UTC+01:00 (WEST)
- Website: https://uf-alvitosecouto.pt/

Alvito (São Pedro e São Martinho) e Couto is a civil parish in the municipality of Barcelos in the district of Braga, Portugal. It was formed in 2013 by the merger of the former parishes Alvito (São Pedro), Alvito (São Martinho) and Couto. The population in 2011 was 1,438, in an area of 8.54 km^{2}.
