= Santo António da Charneca =

- Civil parish
- Location in Portugal
- Coordinates: 38.624722°N 9.033611°W
- Country: Portugal
- Region: Lisbon
- Metropolitan area: Lisbon
- District: Setúbal
- Municipality: Barreiro

Area
  - Total: 7.70 km^{2} (2.97 sq mi)

Population (2011)
  - Total: 11,536
  - Density: 1,500/km^{2} (3,880/sq mi)
- Time zone: UTC+00:00 (WET)
  - Summer (DST): UTC+01:00 (WEST)

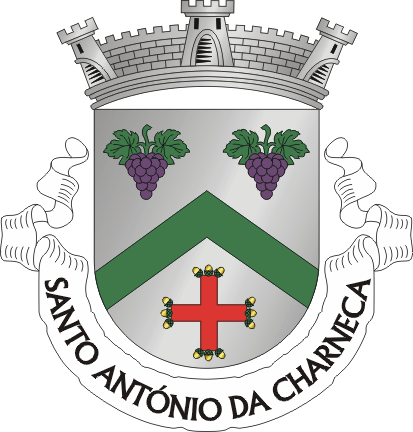
Crest of Santo António da Charneca parish, Barreiro municipality (Portugal)

Santo António da Charneca is a civil parish in the municipality of Barreiro, Portugal. The population in 2011 was 11,536.
