= Viatodos, Grimancelos, Minhotães e Monte de Fralães =

- Civil parish
- Location in Portugal
- Coordinates: 41.449°N 8.557°W
- Country: Portugal
- Region: Norte
- Intermunic. comm.: Cávado
- District: Braga
- Municipality: Barcelos

Area
  - Total: 12.40 km^{2} (4.79 sq mi)

Population (2011)
  - Total: 3,814
  - Density: 307.6/km^{2} (796.6/sq mi)
- Time zone: UTC+00:00 (WET)
  - Summer (DST): UTC+01:00 (WEST)

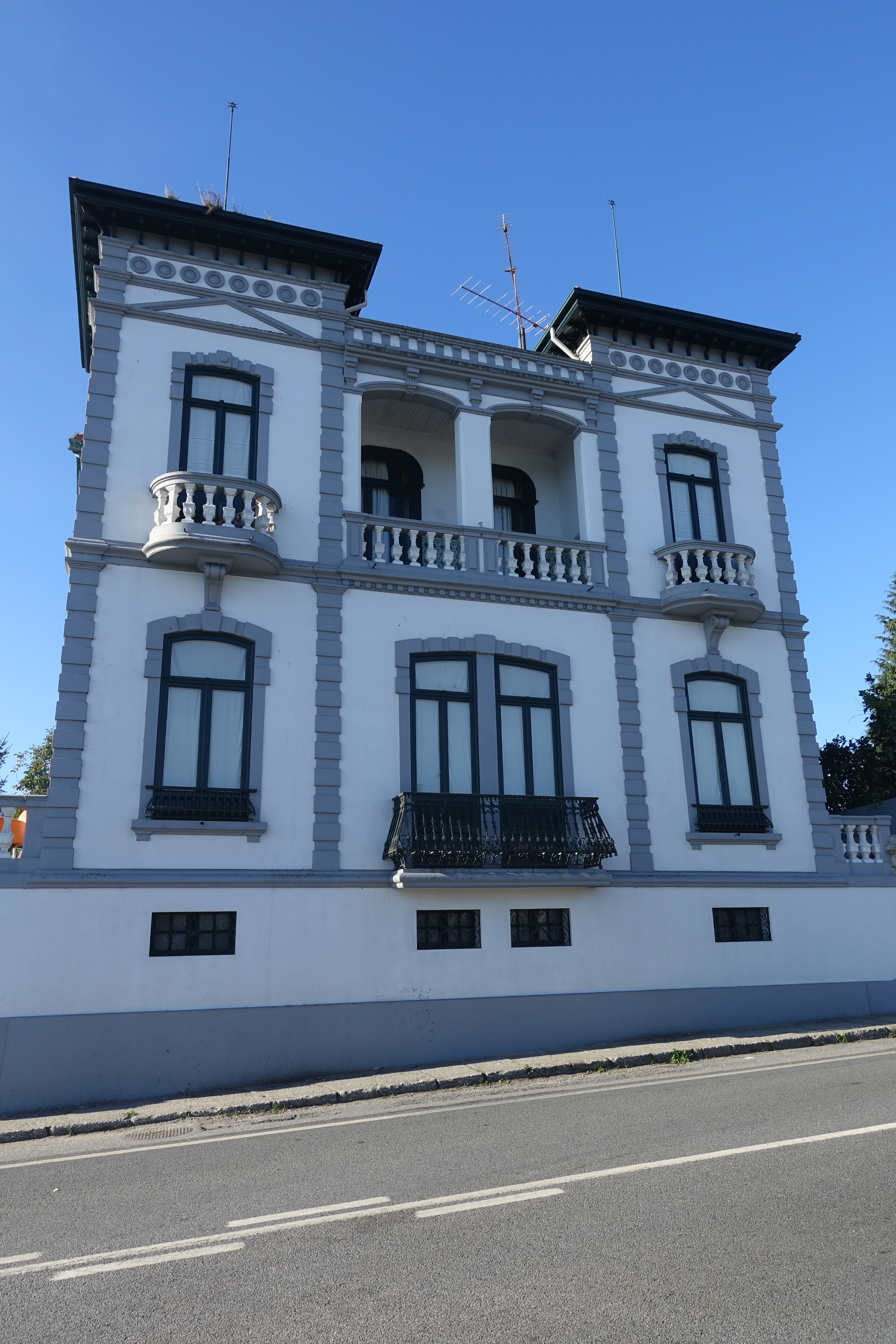
A house in Viatodos

Viatodos, Grimancelos, Minhotães e Monte de Fralães is a civil parish in the municipality of Barcelos, Portugal. It was formed in 2013 by the merger of the former parishes Viatodos, Grimancelos, Minhotães and Monte de Fralães. The population in 2011 was 3,814, in an area of 12.40 km^{2} (4.79 sq mi).
