= Sequeade e Bastuço (São João e Santo Estêvão) =

- Civil parish
- Location in Portugal
- Coordinates: 41.502°N 8.543°W
- Country: Portugal
- Region: Norte
- Intermunic. comm.: Cávado
- District: Braga
- Municipality: Barcelos

Area
  - Total: 6.34 km^{2} (2.45 sq mi)

Population (2011)
  - Total: 1,916
  - Density: 302/km^{2} (783/sq mi)
- Time zone: UTC+00:00 (WET)
  - Summer (DST): UTC+01:00 (WEST)

Sequeade e Bastuço (São João e Santo Estêvão) is a civil parish in the municipality of Barcelos, Portugal. It was formed in 2013 by the merger of the former parishes Sequeade, Bastuço (São João) and Bastuço (Santo Estêvão). The population in 2011 was 1,916, in an area of 6.34 km^{2} (2.45 sq mi).

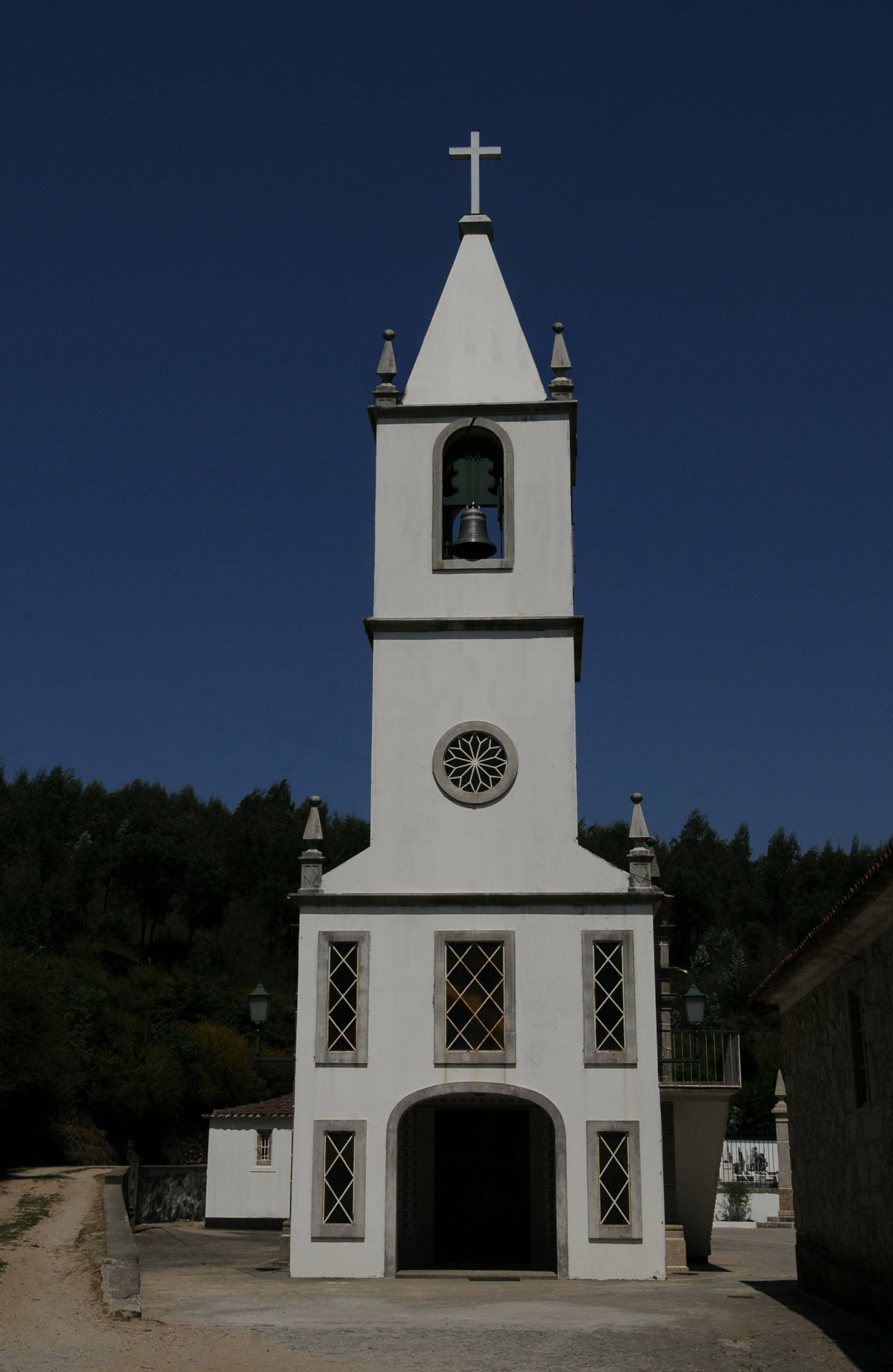
Sequeade Church

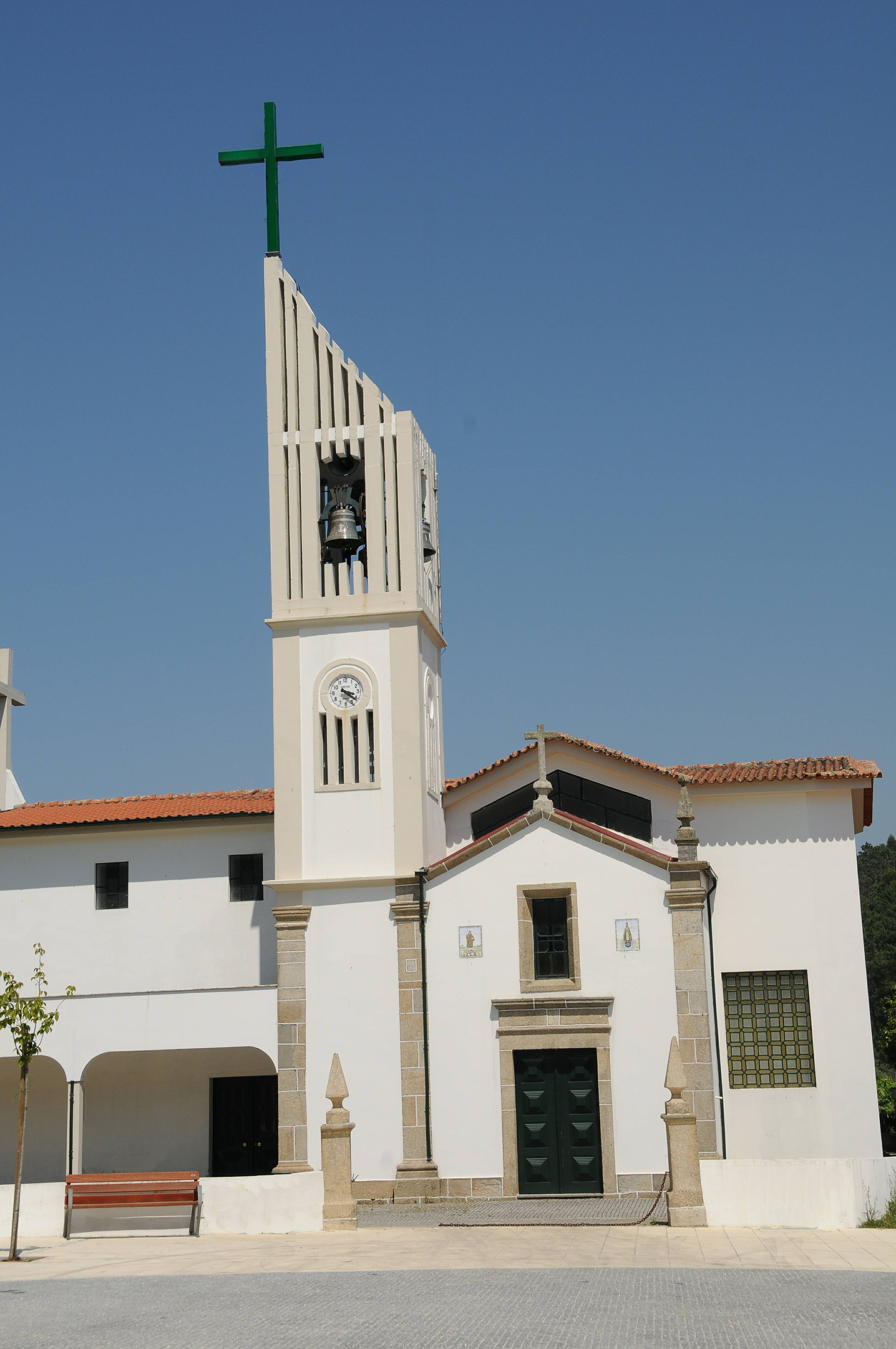
Santo Estêvão de Bastuço Church

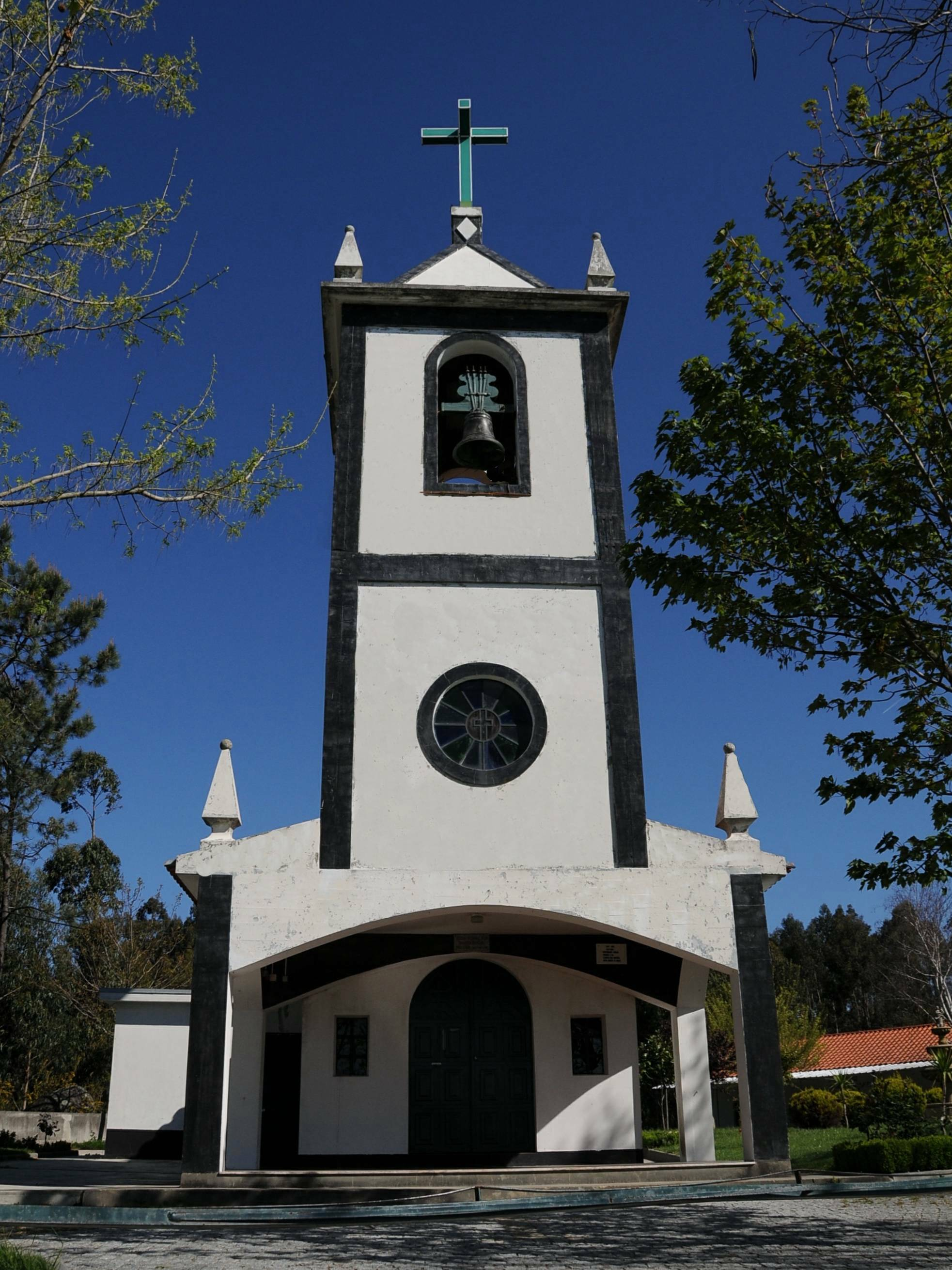
Our Lady of Good Faith Church, Bastuço
