= Lomar e Arcos =

- Civil parish
- Location in Portugal
- Coordinates: 41.526°N 8.429°W
- Country: Portugal
- Region: Norte
- Intermunic. comm.: Cávado
- District: Braga
- Municipality: Braga

Area
  - Total: 4.01 km^{2} (1.55 sq mi)

Population (2011)
  - Total: 6,805
  - Density: 1,700/km^{2} (4,400/sq mi)
- Time zone: UTC+00:00 (WET)
  - Summer (DST): UTC+01:00 (WEST)

Lomar e Arcos is a civil parish in the municipality of Braga, Portugal. It was formed in 2013 by the merger of the former parishes Lomar and Arcos. The population in 2011 was 6,805, in an area of 4.01 km^{2}.

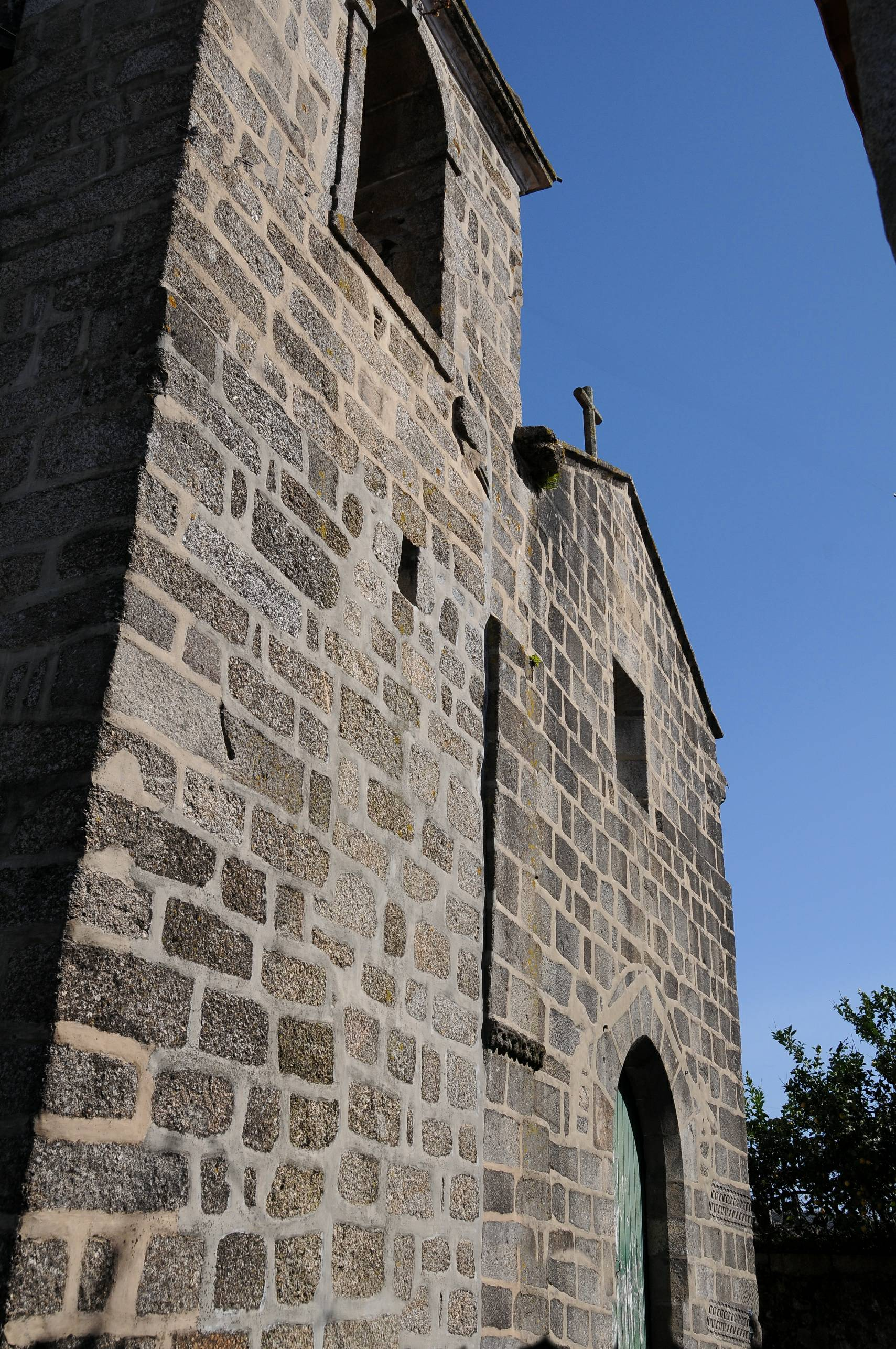
Lomar Church

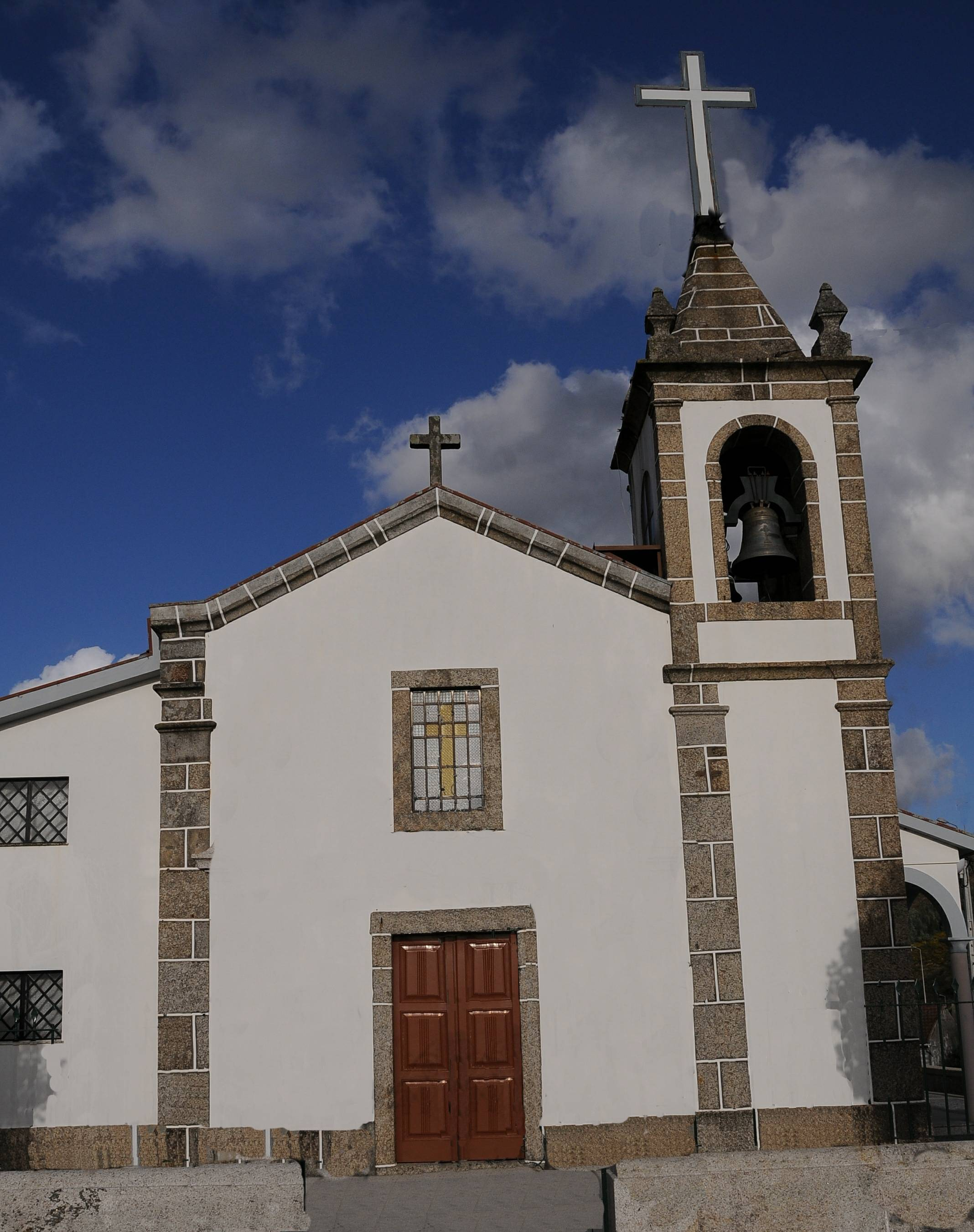
Arcos Church
