= Izeda, Calvelhe e Paradinha Nova =

- Civil parish
- Location in Portugal
- Coordinates: 41.567°N 6.721°W
- Country: Portugal
- Region: Norte
- Intermunic. comm.: Terras de Trás-os-Montes
- District: Bragança
- Municipality: Bragança

Area
  - Total: 72.67 km^{2} (28.06 sq mi)

Population (2011)
  - Total: 1,212
  - Density: 16.68/km^{2} (43.20/sq mi)
- Time zone: UTC+00:00 (WET)
  - Summer (DST): UTC+01:00 (WEST)

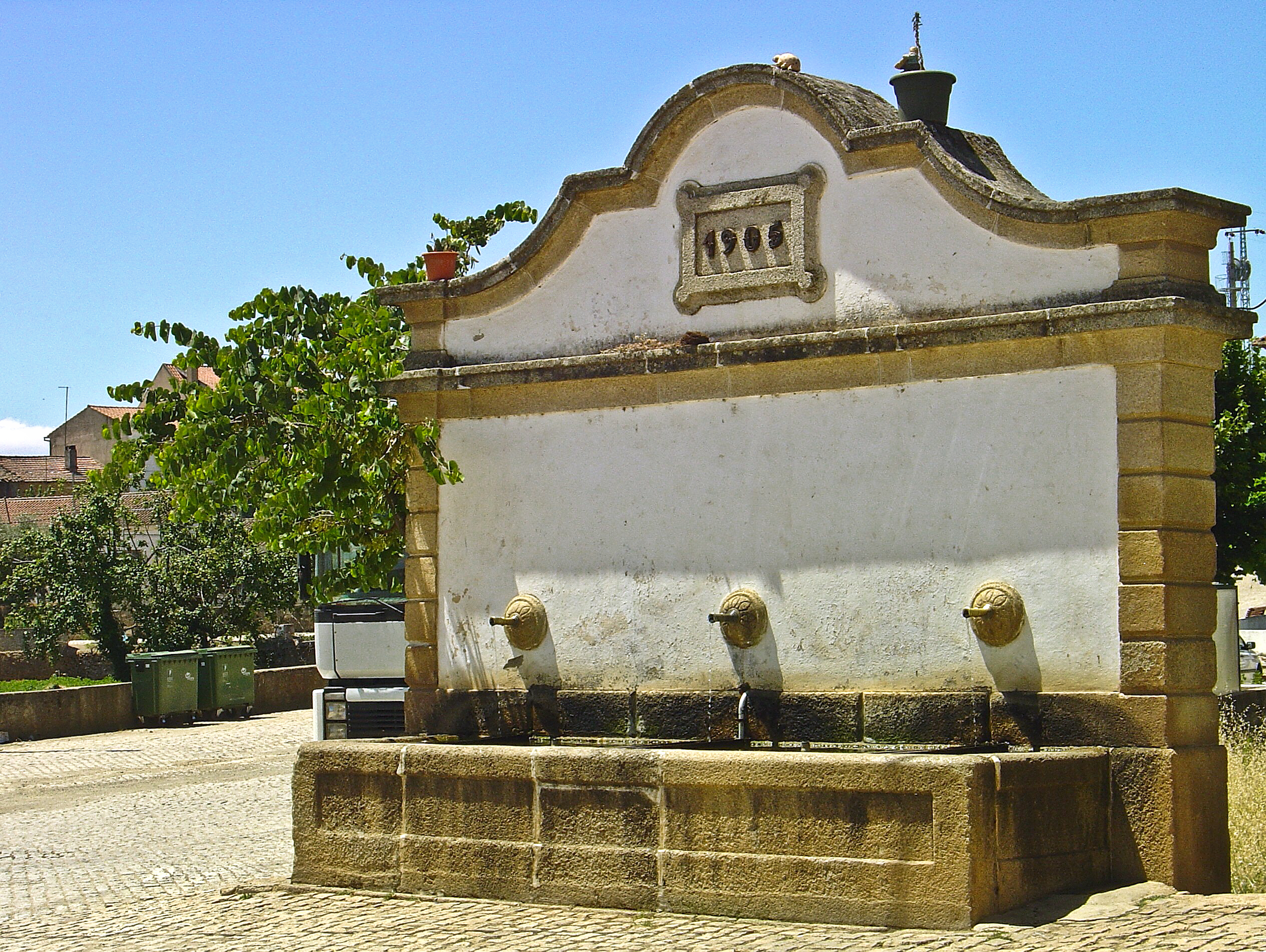

Izeda, Calvelhe e Paradinha Nova is a civil parish in the municipality of Bragança, Portugal. It was formed in 2013 by the merger of the former parishes Izeda, Calvelhe and Paradinha Nova. The population in 2011 was 1,212, in an area of 72.67 km^{2} (28.06 sq mi).
