= Parada e Failde =

- Civil parish
- Location in Portugal
- Coordinates: 41.68°N 6.70°W
- Country: Portugal
- Region: Norte
- Intermunic. comm.: Terras de Trás-os-Montes
- District: Bragança
- Municipality: Bragança

Area
  - Total: 52.13 km^{2} (20.13 sq mi)

Population (2011)
  - Total: 657
  - Density: 13/km^{2} (33/sq mi)
- Time zone: UTC+00:00 (WET)
  - Summer (DST): UTC+01:00 (WEST)

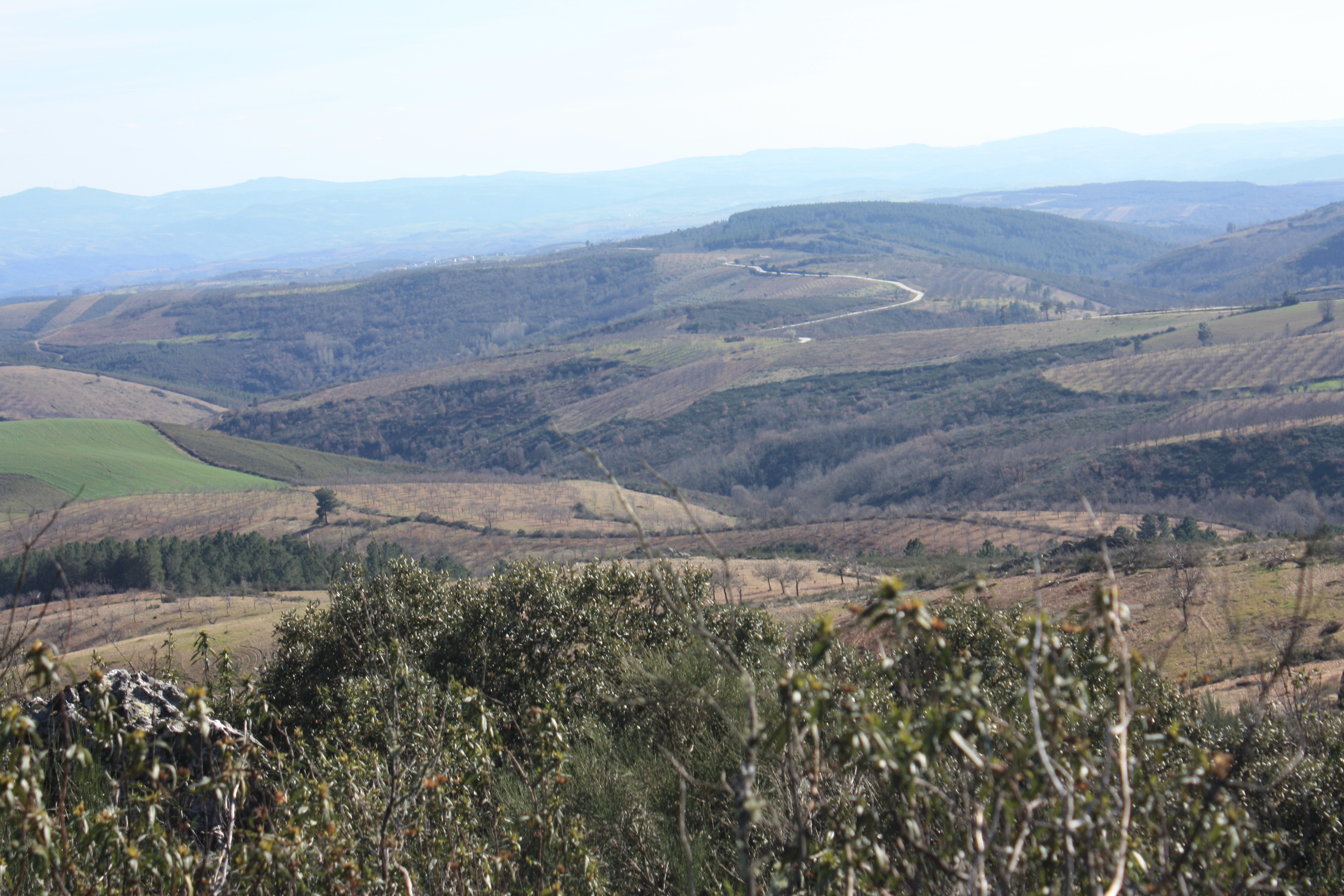

Parada e Failde is a civil parish in the municipality of Bragança, Portugal. It was formed in 2013 by the merger of the former parishes Parada and Failde. The population in 2011 was 657, in an area of 52.13 km^{2}.
