= Creixomil e Mariz =

- Civil parish
- Location in Portugal
- Coordinates: 41.539°N 8.672°W
- Country: Portugal
- Region: Norte
- Intermunic. comm.: Cávado
- District: Braga
- Municipality: Barcelos

Area
  - Total: 6.98 km^{2} (2.69 sq mi)

Population (2011)
  - Total: 1,208
  - Density: 173/km^{2} (448/sq mi)
- Time zone: UTC+00:00 (WET)
  - Summer (DST): UTC+01:00 (WEST)

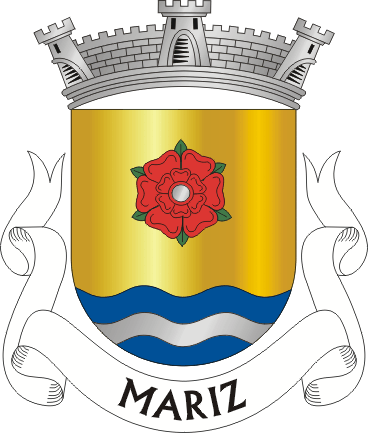
Crest of former parish Mariz

Creixomil e Mariz is a civil parish in the municipality of Barcelos, Portugal. It was formed in 2013 by the merger of the former parishes Creixomil and Mariz. It has an area of 6.98 km^{2} (2.69 sq mi), and its population in 2011 was 1,208.
