= Arentim e Cunha =

- Civil parish
- Location in Portugal
- Coordinates: 41.492°N 8.509°W
- Country: Portugal
- Region: Norte
- Intermunic. comm.: Cávado
- District: Braga
- Municipality: Braga

Area
  - Total: 5.72 km^{2} (2.21 sq mi)

Population (2011)
  - Total: 1,530
  - Density: 267/km^{2} (693/sq mi)
- Time zone: UTC+00:00 (WET)
  - Summer (DST): UTC+01:00 (WEST)

Arentim e Cunha is a civil parish in the municipality of Braga, Portugal. It was formed in 2013 by the merger of the former parishes Arentim and Cunha. The population in 2011 was 1,530, in an area of 5.72 km^{2} (2.21 sq mi).

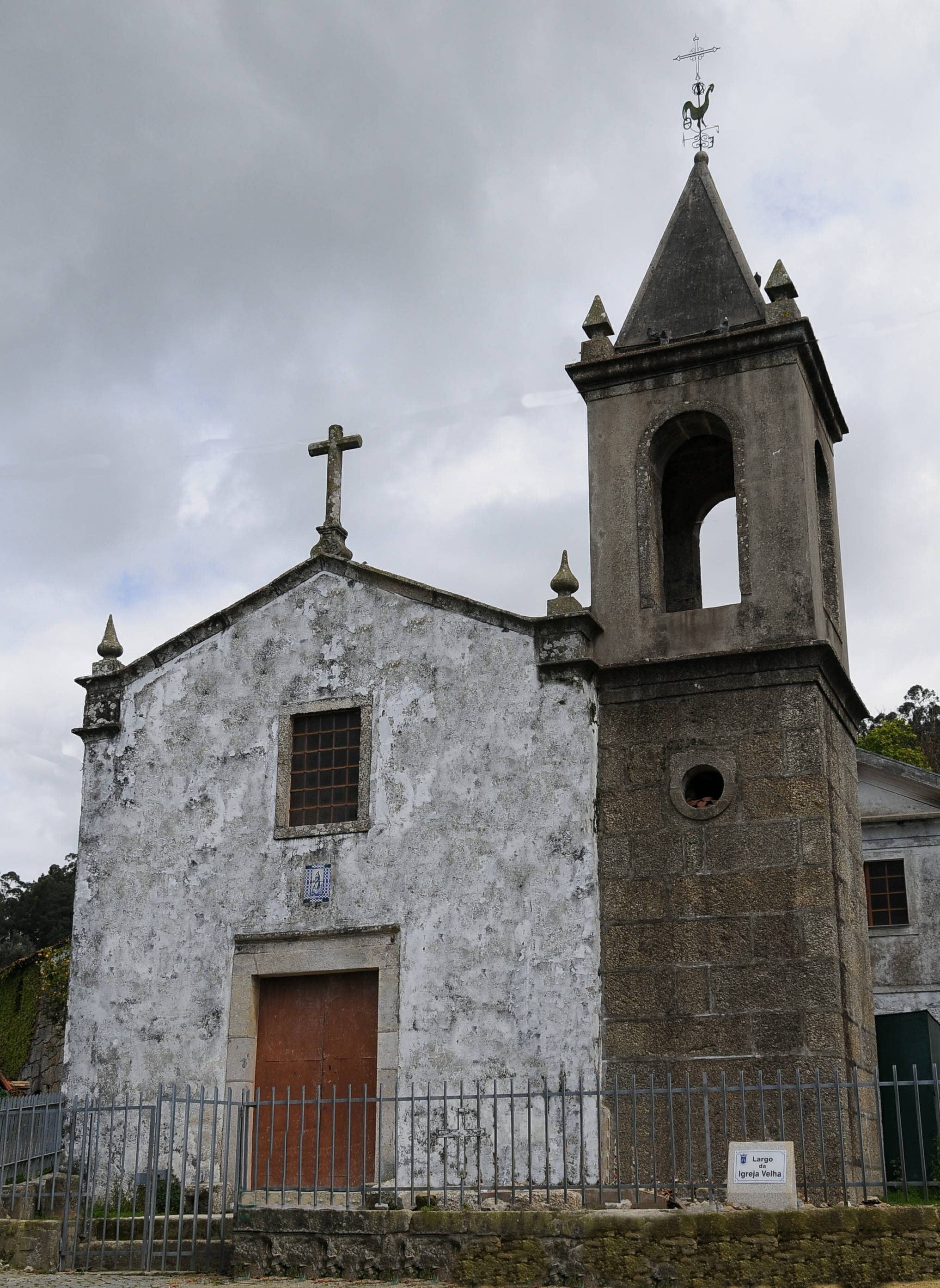
Arentim Church

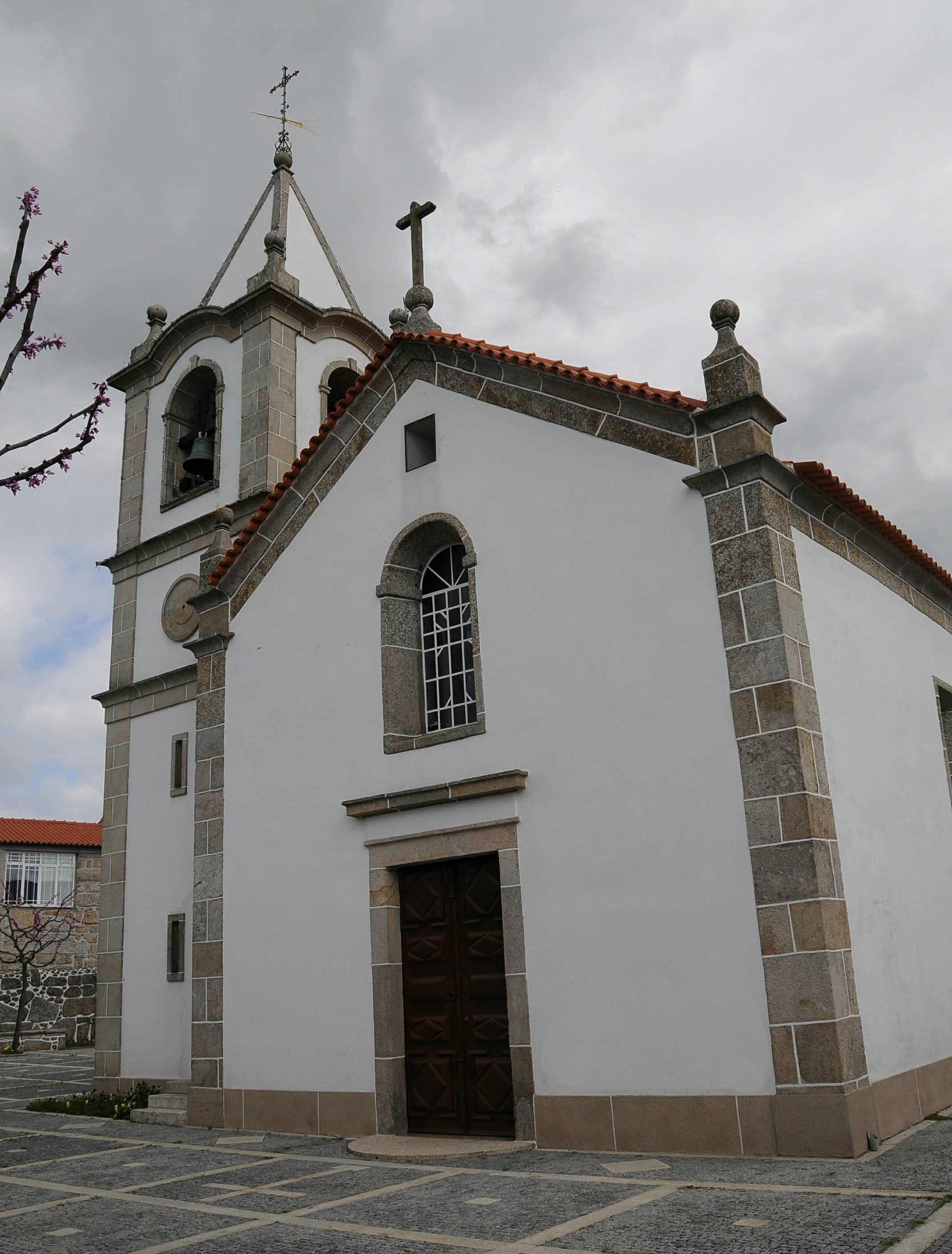
Cunha Church
