= Gamil e Midões =

- Civil parish
- Location in Portugal
- Coordinates: 41.517°N 8.591°W
- Country: Portugal
- Region: Norte
- Intermunic. comm.: Cávado
- District: Braga
- Municipality: Barcelos

Area
  - Total: 5.84 km^{2} (2.25 sq mi)

Population (2011)
  - Total: 1,386
  - Density: 237/km^{2} (615/sq mi)
- Time zone: UTC+00:00 (WET)
  - Summer (DST): UTC+01:00 (WEST)

Gamil e Midões is a civil parish in the municipality of Barcelos, Portugal. It was formed in 2013 by the merger of the former parishes Gamil and Midões. The population in 2011 was 1,386, in an area of 5.84 km^{2} (2.25 sq mi).

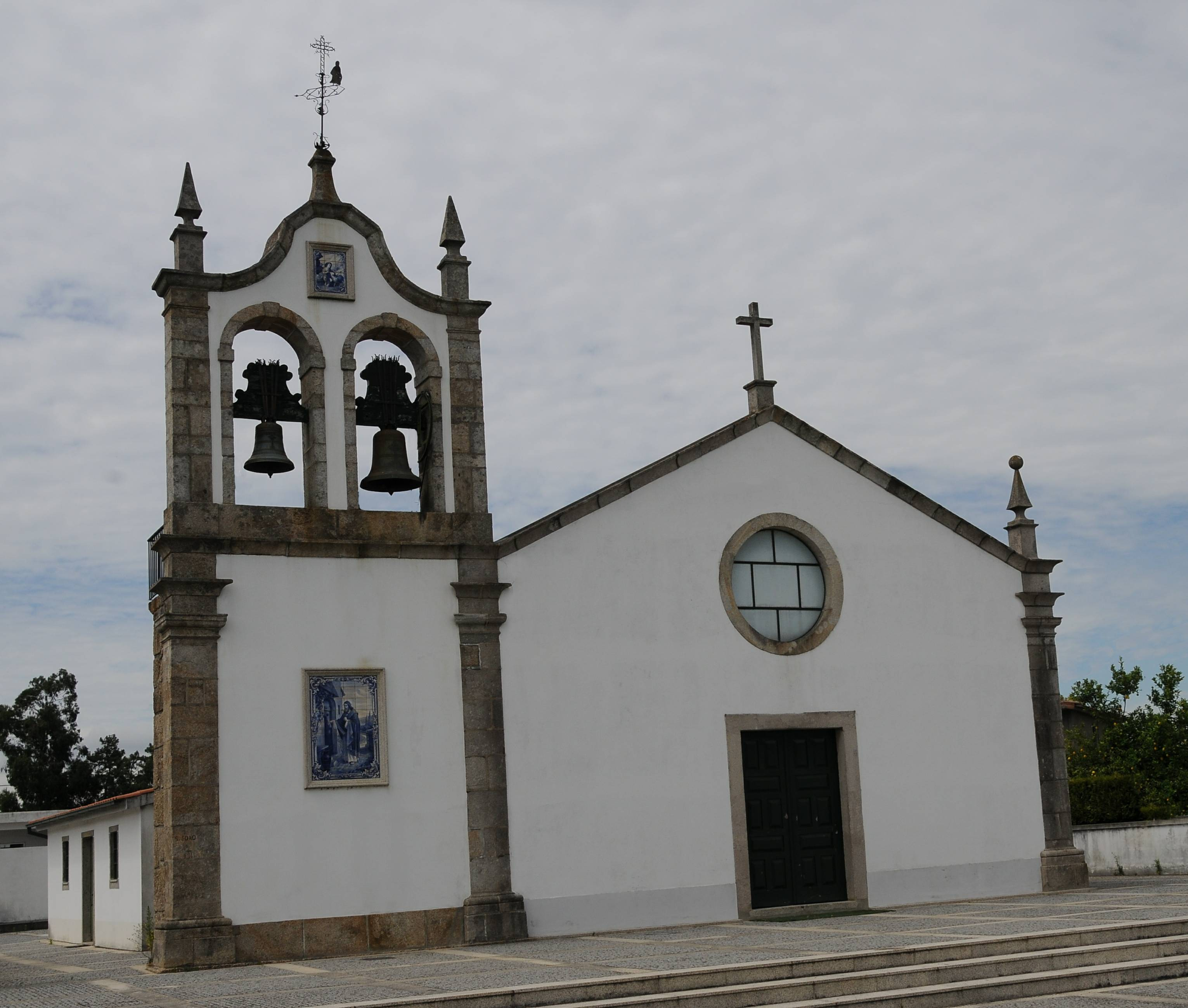
Gamil Church
