= Brazil (disambiguation) =

Brazil is the largest country in both South America and Latin America.

Brazil or Brasil may also refer to:

== Film and television ==
- Brazil (1944 film), a musical comedy starring Tito Guízar and Virginia Bruce, about a composer masquerading as twins
- Brazil (1985 film), a dystopian black comedy by Terry Gilliam
- Brasil (film), a 2002 short film by F. Javier Gutiérrez
- Canal Brasil, a Brazilian subscription TV channel
- Rede Brasil de Televisão, also known as Rede Brasil, a Brazilian TV network
- TV Brasil, a Brazilian public TV network

== Music ==
- Brasil (band), a 2010s American rock band
- Brazil (band), a 2000s American rock band

=== Albums ===
- Brasil (1981 album), by João Gilberto with Caetano Veloso, Gilberto Gil and Maria Bethânia
- Brasil (The Manhattan Transfer album), 1987
- Brasil (Ratos de Porão album), 1989
- Brazil (Men at Work album), 1998
- Brazil (The Ritchie Family album), 1975
- Brazil (Rosemary Clooney album), 2000
- Brazil: Forró - Music for Maids and Taxi Drivers, 1989
- Brazil: Once Again, by Herbie Mann, 1978
- Brazil (EP), by Loona, 2014

=== Songs ===
- "Aquarela do Brasil" or "Brazil", written by Ary Barroso, 1939; covered by many performers
- "Brasil" (Cazuza song), 1988
- "Brasil" (EOB song), 2019
- "Brasil", by Tom Boxer feat. Anca Parghel and Fly Project, 2007
- "Brazil" (Declan McKenna song), 2015
- "Brazil (2nd Edit)", by deadmau5, 2008
- "Brazil", by Bebi Dol, representing Yugoslavia in the Eurovision Song Contest 1991
- "Brazil", by Iggy Azalea from The End of an Era, 2021
- "Brazil", by Kenny G from Paradise

== Places ==
=== United States ===
- Brazil, Indiana, a city
- Brazil, Iowa, an unincorporated community
- Brazil, Mississippi, an unincorporated community
- Brazil, Missouri, a ghost town
- Brazil, Tennessee, an unincorporated community

=== Elsewhere ===
- Brasil (mythical island), a phantom island featured in Irish myths
- Empire of Brazil (1822–1889), a state largely encompassing the territories of modern Brazil and Uruguay
- Monte Brasil, a peninsula in Azores, Portugal

== Publications ==
- Agência Brasil, a Brazilian public news agency
- Brazil (Palin book), a 2012 book by Michael Palin
- Brazil (novel), a novel by John Updike
- Jornal do Brasil, a private Brazilian newspaper

== Technology ==
- Brazil R/S, a rendering plug-in
- Brazil, code name for an edition of the Plan 9 from Bell Labs operating system
- Brazil, a class of locomotives build by Kerr, Stuart and Company

== Other uses ==
- Brazil (surname)
- Brasil (surname)

== See also ==
- Brazil national football team
- Brazil nut, a South American tree and the commercially harvested edible seed
- Brazile (disambiguation)
- Brazilian (disambiguation)
- Brazil Songs, record chart published by Billboard
- Paubrasilia echinata, a tree, commonly known as Pau-Brasil
- United Kingdom of Portugal, Brazil and the Algarves (1815–1825)
