= Brasileira =

Brasileira (Brazilian) may refer to:

- Brasileira, Piauí, municipality in the state of Piauí in the Northeast region of Brazil
- Café A Brasileira, café in the civil parish of Sacramento, Lisbon, Portugal
- Café A Brasileira (Braga), café in the civil parish of Braga, Portugal
- Linhas Aéreas Brasileiras, Brazilian airline founded in 1945
- Linha Aérea Transcontinental Brasileira, Brazilian airline formed in 1944
- Música popular brasileira, Brazilian pop music, a trend in post-bossa nova urban popular music in Brazil

== See also ==
- Brazilian (disambiguation)
