= 1979 Queen's Birthday Honours (Australia) =

The 1979 Queen's Birthday Honours for Australia were appointments to recognise and reward good works by citizens of Australia and other nations that contribute to Australia. The Birthday Honours are awarded as part of the Queen's Official Birthday celebrations and were announced on 6 June 1979 in Australia.

The recipients of honours are displayed as they were styled before their new honour and arranged by honour with grades and then divisions i.e. Civil, Diplomatic and Military as appropriate.

== Order of Australia ==
The following appointments were made in the Order of Australia.

=== Companion (AC) ===
==== General Division ====
- Sir Donald (George) Bradman – For service to cricket and cricket administration.
- The Honourable Dr. John Jefferson Bray – For service to the law, to literature and to the community.
- The Honourable Robert Reginald Downing – For service to politics and government.
- The Honourable Donald Allan Dunstan QC – For service to politics and government.

=== Officer (AO) ===
==== General Division ====
- Keith Gabriel Brennan – For public service as a diplomatic representative.
- Dr Lloyd Thomas Evans – For public service to science.
- Reverend Father Francis Stanislaus Flynn – For community service, particularly in the fields of religion, medicine and Aboriginal welfare.
- Athol Vere Gough – For public service to education.
- Professor Richard Norman Peter Johnson – For service to architecture.
- Albert Walter Jones – For public service to education.
- Ernest William Palmer – For service to the sport of game fishing and to commerce.
- Douglas Alexander Stewart OBE – For service to literature.
- John Walker Utz – For service to industry.
- Leonard Gatton Wilson – For public service to science.

==== Military Division ====
Royal Australian Navy

- Rear Admiral Guy Richmond Griffiths DSO, DSC, RAN – For service to the Royal Australian Navy over a period of forty-two years and particularly as Chief of Naval Personnel.

Australian Army

- Major General Bruce Alexander McDonald DSO, OBE, MC – For service in positions of great responsibility including General Officer Commanding Training Commanding Training Command
- Major General Francis Eric Poke ED – For service in positions of great responsibility in the Army Reserve.
- Brigadier Paul Duke Yonge – For service in positions of great responsibility in both the general staff and engineering fields of endeavour.

Royal Australian Air Force

- Air Vice-Marshal Frederick William Barnes DFC AFC – For distinguished service as Air Officer Commanding Support Command.

=== Member (AM) ===
==== General Division ====
- Joseph Saviour Attard JP – For service in the field of migrant welfare.
- Geoffrey Mervyn Ayling – For service to the sport of rifle shooting.
- Maurice William Bednall – For community service.
- Dr Allan John Bloomfield – For service to the dental profession.
- Lindsay Burton Bowes – For public service to industry.
- Rabbi Dr Rudolph Brasch – For service to the Jewish community.
- Dr Lisbeth Angelika Brodribb – For service to business and industry.
- Howard Keith Carey – For service to the Scout Association of Australia.
- Norman Arnold Currie – For service to trade unionism.
- Merle Lloyd Deer – For service to the Girl Guides Association of Australia.
- Bruce William Dilger – For service to the community and to local government.
- Reverend Keith Lachlan Doust – For service to religion.
- Mollie Geraldine Dyer – For service in the field of Aboriginal welfare.
- Marea Gazzard – For service to art, particularly in the field of ceramics.
- Leslie Gibbs BEM – For community service.
- Antonio Giordano – For service in the field of migrant welfare.
- Dr Maureen Grattan-Smith – For public service to medicine.
- Arthur William Latham – For service to local government and to the community.
- Gunner Vernon Lawrence – For community service, particularly in the development of the Murray Valley region.
- Marlene Judith Matthews – For service to the sport of athletics.
- Henry William Marryat – For community service, particularly in the field of fire protection.
- Paul John McKeown – For service to education.
- Gavan Ray Oakley – For service to local government.
- Councillor Patricia Oakman – For service to local government and to the community.
- Frank Lionel O'Keefe – For service to local government and to the community.
- Dr John Hemsley Pearn – For service to medicine, particularly in the field of child health.
- Norman James Brian Plomley – For service to the field of historical research.
- Ross Anthony Rumble – For service to industry.
- David Michael Shannon – For service to art.
- Walter Stiansny – For service to music.
- John Alexander Wiseman Strath – For public service to defence science.
- Professor Kenneth Joseph George Sutherland – For service to dentistry.
- Dr Bryan William Thompson – For community service.
- Ralph Mansfield Tremethick JP – For service to trade unionism, particularly to the Police Federation of Australia.
- Judah Leon Waten – For service to literature.
- George Tennyson Webb – For public service to transport.
- Ronald John Withnall – For public service.
- Henry Herbert Yoffa – For service to the welfare of ex-service men and women.

==== Military Division ====
Royal Australian Navy

- Captain Sydney Frank Comfort RAN – For high standards and devotion to duty in the training and education of Royal Australian Navy personnel.
- Captain Brian Geoffrey Gibbs RAN – For loyalty and dedication to the Royal Australian Navy Legal Service.

Australian Army

- Lieutenant-Colonel Phillip Davies – For dedication and devotion to Army duties, and service to the Singleton community.
- Chaplain Second Class Kevin Douglas Hoffmann – For dedication and professional efficiency as an Army Chaplain.
- Brigadier Ian James Meibusch – For professional ability and dedication to duty in the field of acquisition at national and international level.
- Colonel Robert Duncan Mercer ED – For service to the Army Reserve.
- Colonel Eric Ronald Philip – For dedication to the Army, in particular his contribution to the effectiveness of the Infantry Corps.
- Lieutenant-Colonel James Harold Townley – For performance of duties as the Commanding Officer of the 1st Field Regiment.

Royal Australian Air Force

- Wing Commander John Patrick Ferdinand Baker – For service as an Administrative Officer at Royal Australian Air Force Base, Townsville.
- Chaplain Jack Graham Leonard – For service as a Chaplain in the Royal Australian Air Force.
- Group Captain Terence Ernest Philpott – For service as an Equipment Officer in the Royal Australian Air Force.
- Wing Commander Ernest Barry Watson – For service as an Aeronautical Engineer Officer in the Royal Australian Air Force.

=== Medal (OAM) ===
==== General Division ====
- Ulrikka Jean Alexander – For service to the sport of hockey.
- George William Francis Althoffer – For service to the conservation of Australian flora.
- Michael Anastassiou – For community service.
- Gladys Hilda Aubourg JP – For community service.
- Thomas Charles Beaumont BEM – For community service.
- Betty Linda Berg – For service to the sport of women's basketball.
- Elisabeth Best – For community service.
- Elizabeth Patricia Bowman – For community service.
- Gilbert Stanley Broomfield – For service to the community and to the welfare of ex-service men and women.
- David Jonathon Byrnes – For public service.
- Thomas Ross Caddy – For community service.
- Norman Chaffer – For service to conservation.
- Milton Harvey Checker – For community service.
- Eric Charles Child – For service to music.
- Joyce Bernadette Coorey – For community service.
- Marjorie Douglas Cornell – For service to music.
- Alderman Norman Clive Cox – For service to local government and to the community.
- Mary Terese Cranswick – For public service.
- Thomas John Delaney – For community service.
- John Geoffrey Druett – For community service.
- David George William Drysdale – For service in the field of Aboriginal welfare.
- Ingrid Ameliad Drysdale – For service in the field of Aboriginal welfare.
- Grace Elizabeth Edwards – For service to the sport of croquet.
- Donald Rex Elliott – For service to local government and to the community.
- Kathleen Mary Ellis – For community service.
- Marie Corella Ellis – For service to handicapped children, through the Girl Guides Association of Queensland.
- Mirabella Ellis – For service to the sport of horse riding.
- Maxwell Harold Filer – For service to the welfare of ex-servicemen and women.
- Joseph Ross Fletcher – For service to trade unionism.
- Frederick William Fritsch – For community service.
- Reginald Edward Gallagher – For public service.
- Clive Conrad Gesling – For community service.
- Milton James Gooley – For public service.
- Brimalaw Smythe Green – For community service.
- Joan Mary Hauxwell – For public service to nursing.
- Philip Robert Heydon – For public service.
- Kenneth Norwood Mends Hillyar – For service to the transport industry.
- Eleanor Adelaide Elizabeth Jesiman – For service to handicapped children, particularly in teaching the deaf.
- Jack Keen – For service to the Scouts Association of Australia.
- Daphne May Kingston – For service to nursing.
- William Victor Ladner – For community service.
- Roy Thomas Livingston – For service to local government and to the community.
- Ronald Francis Macfarlane – For public service.
- Grace Gladys MacGibbon – For service to music.
- John Charles Maguire – For service in the field of teaching.
- Gillian Marvin – For community service.
- John William McAlister – For community service.
- Keith Reginald McAlister – For public service.
- Kenneth Hindle McBurnie JP – For service to the welfare of ex-servicemen and women.
- Laurel Kathleen McIntyre – For community service.
- Ray Mitchell – For community service.
- Henry Milton Scott – For public service and service to the community.
- Sister Helen Pamela Shaw – For service to nursing and child welfare.
- Vincent Joseph Shaw – For service to swimming and life-saving.
- John Cameron Small – For service to the sport of basketball.
- Robert George Smith – For community service.
- Robert Bruce Smith – For service in the field of teaching.
- Norman James Sparnon – For service to floral art.
- Selwyn Speight – For service to journalism and broadcasting.
- Lucy Francis Stone – For service to the Girl Guides Association of Australia.
- Claire Hinchcliffe Sunderland – For service to the sport of motor cycling.
- Walter Aloysius Torrington – For community service.
- Anne Catherine von Bertouch – For service to the visual arts.
- John Francis Wallace – For community service.
- Colin Hugh Watt DFM – For service to handicapped children.
- Edward George Weblin – For service to junior cricket.
- George Arnold Wiffen – For public service and for service to the welfare of ex-service men and women.
- William Ernest Wigzell – For service to the sport of motor racing.
- Joseph Edward Williams – For public service and for service to the community.
- Antonie Witsel – For community service.

== Knight Bachelor ==
- Emeritus Professor Geoffrey Malcolm Badger, AO – For distinguished service to science and education.
- The Honourable Walter Angus Bethune – For distinguished parliamentary service.
- The Honourable Thomas Charles Drake-Brockman, DFC – For distinguished parliamentary service.
- The Honourable Mr Justice Walter Benjamin Campbell – For distinguished service to government, law and education.
- Max Dillon – For distinguished service to commerce and industry.
- Nicholas Laurantus, MBE – For distinguished service to the community.
- Eric Herbert Pearce, OBE – For distinguished service to the community.
- Geoffrey John Yeend, CBE – For distinguished public service.

== Order of the Bath ==
=== Companion of the Order of the Bath (CB) ===
Civil Division

- Duncan Robert Steele Craik, OBE – For outstanding public service.
- Laurence John Daniels, OBE – For outstanding public service.
- Dr. Gwyn Howells – For outstanding public service.

== Order of Saint Michael and Saint George ==
The following appointments were made in the Order of Saint Michael and Saint George.

=== Companion of the Order of St Michael and St George (CMG) ===
- Professor Arthur John Birch – For service to science.
- The Honourable Leslie Harry Ernest Bury – For parliamentary service.
- The Honourable John Leslie Stuart MacFarlane, MLA – For parliamentary service and service to primary industry.

== Order of the British Empire ==
The following appointments were made in the Order of the British Empire.

=== Dame Commander of the Order of the British Empire (DBE) ===
Civil Division

- Mary Valerie Hall Austin, OBE – For distinguished service to the community.
- Sister Mary Phillipa (Josephine Brazill) – For distinguished service to the community.

=== Commander of the Order of the British Empire (CBE) ===
Civil Division

- Professor Wilfred David Borrie, OBE – For service to social science.
- Douglas Squire Irving Burrows, MBE – For service to children's health.
- Emeritus Professor Colin Malcolm Donald – For service to agricultural science.
- Dorothy Edna Annie Edwards, OBE – For service to the community.
- Percival Crawford Murray – For service to industry.
- Donald Neil Symons – For service to industry and to the community.
- Albert Joseph Teal – For service to industry and to the community.
- Dr. James Geoffrey Toakley – For service to medicine and to handicapped children.

=== Officer of the Order of the British Empire (OBE) ===
Civil Division

- Allen James Aylett – For service to the sport of Australian Rules Football.
- Frederick Henry Brooks, ISO – For service to the welfare of disadvantaged children.
- Ita Clare Buttrose – For service to journalism.
- Iris Anna Cameron – For service to the community.
- Professor Enid Mona Campbell – For service in education in the field of law.
- William Harold Clough – For service to civil engineering.
- John Cornelius Conway – For public service.
- Henry Charles Foletta – For service to the textile industry.
- Patrick Galvin – For parliamentary service, service to trade unionism and to sport.
- The Right Reverend Kenneth Joseph Gardner – For service to religion.
- Thomas Walter Hardy – For service to the wine industry.
- Andrew Osborne Hay – For public service.
- Vernon Victor Hickman – For service to the zoological sciences and to education.
- The Honourable William Clark Hofeman, QC MLC – For community services.
- Robert William Holberton – For public service.
- Ronald Kilpatrick Hunter – For service to primary industry.
- Kenneth Ross Ingram – For public service.
- Harold Rupert Irving – For service to commerce and accounting.
- The Reverend Dr. Percy Jones, MBE – For service to music.
- Campbell Wright Le Page – For service to the insurance industry.
- Malcolm Elliot Lyon – For public service.
- William Robert Smith MacRae – For service to the textile industry.
- Wandjuk Djuwakan Marika – For service to the arts.
- Robert Paddon – For service to automotive manufacturing and export industries.
- Irwin Prowse – For public service.
- Raymonde Edith Read – For service to the Girl Guides Association.
- Dr. Raymond George Rokeby Robinson – For service to health.
- John Kingsley Taylor – For public service in the field of soil sciences.
- Peter Taylor – For service to the community and the disadvantaged.

=== Member of the Order of the British Empire (MBE) ===
==== Civil Division ====
- Leonard Charles Abbott – For service to the community.
- Lance Colin Armstrong – For service to local government.
- Edvins Baulis – For service to migrants.
- William Gordon Blair – For service to local government and the community.
- Sister Mary Borgia (McNamara) – For service to health.
- Hallam Chesney Broe – For service to civil aviation.
- Raymond Bruce Carter – For service to youth.
- Gordon Noel Chamberlain – For public service.
- Dr. Clifford Stirling Colvin – For service to medicine.
- Donald Austin Cooper – For service to the community.
- Seth David Cottell – For service to health.
- Mabel Patricia Daw – For public service.
- Enoe Maria Di Stefano – For service to migrant welfare.
- William James Dowling – For public service.
- Vera Jean Eagle – For service to children's welfare.
- Roy Douglas Filleul – For service to local government and the community.
- Frank Eric Freeman, MVO – For public service.
- Adel Olga Friman – For public service.
- Kenneth Prosser Grayling – For service to the sport of rugby union.
- The Reverend Maxwell John Lewis Griffiths – For service to religion.
- Ethel Hoskins Hayton, JP – For service to the community.
- Edward Johnson – For service to the community.
- George Henry Kirby – For service to the community.
- Patricia Mary Lance – For service to health.
- Daniel Thomas Lattin – For public service.
- The Reverend Frederick Percival McMaster, ED – For service to religion.
- Derrick Edward Styles Mathews – For service to the community.
- Marie Clare Maunder, JP – For service to women and the community.
- Robert Peter Maxwell – For service to the community.
- Wilbur Keith Moon – For service to health insurance.
- Ralph Allister Mortimer – For service to the community.
- Bert Newton – For service to the performing arts.
- Thomas Myles O'Donnell – For service to medical technology.
- Colin Lindsay Palmer – For service to the performing arts and the community.
- Sister Mary Patrick (Carter) – For service to health.
- John Andrew Pattison – For public service.
- James William Harold Pearce – For public service.
- Bonnie Anne Quintal – For service to health and the community.
- Henry Ross Rayner, MVO – For public service.
- Kerry Reid – For service to the sport of tennis.
- Luigi Ruffino – For service to the community.
- Francis Henry Ruler – For service to youth.
- Francis Keith Smyth – For public service.
- Lisle John Treblico – For service to the community.
- Ronald Stewart Tudor – For service to the recording industry.
- Victor Tuting – For service to the sport of soccer.
- Dr. Luke Everard Verco – For service to medicine.
- Ross Leslie Walker – For service to the community.
- Margaret Jean Warland – For service to children's welfare.
- Sister Mary Sheila White – For service to nursing and the community.

==== Military Division ====
Royal Australian Navy

- Lieutenant Commander Francis David Gunst
- Lieutenant Commander Linwood Clarence Parker Smith
- Lieutenant Commander Frank Dennis Watton

Australian Army

- Major James Andrew Cruickshank, Royal Australian Infantry.
- Captain Arthur Foxley, Royal Australian Infantry.
- Major Albert Andrew Haberley, Royal Australian Infantry.
- Major John Patrick Power, Royal Australian Electrical and Mechanical Engineers.
- Major Allan Peter Thorp, Royal Australian Engineers.

Royal Australian Air Force

- Squadron Leader William Kelvin Brammer, AE
- Squadron Leader Neville James Conn
- Squadron Leader Barrie John Miller
- Flight Lieutenant Alan Patrick Worthington

== Companion of the Imperial Service Order (ISO) ==
- Frank Ellis Gare – For public service in the field of Aboriginal affairs.

== British Empire Medal (BEM) ==
=== Civil Division ===
- Wallace Sproule Alexander – For service to the community.
- Edith Marian Anderson – For service to the community and the arts.
- Topsy Beer – For service to the community and youth.
- Phyllis May Best – For public service.
- Lorna Ethyl Breaden – For public service.
- George William Carver – For service to veterans and the community.
- Sheila Maria Conway – For public service.
- Eva Coutts – For service to the community.
- Anthony Dennis Duffy – For service to sport.
- Edgar Hardy Enscoe – for service to fire safety.
- Max Francis Fendler – For service to veterans.
- Francis William Gomm – For service to veterans.
- Valmae Gordon – For service to the community.
- Herbert Percival Gridley – For public service.
- William Kingston Hampson – For service to the community and the aged.
- Dorothea Isabel Henslowe – For service to local tourism and to the community.
- Geoffrey Morris Jones – For service to fire safety. (To be dated 5 February 1979.)
- Lawrence Julius – For public service.
- Ronald Gaius King – For public service.
- Betty Virginia Lamond – For public service.
- Jessie Elizabeth Leonard – For service to the visually handicapped.
- John James Michael Lillis – For service to the community.
- Florence Alma Littlejohn – For service to the community.
- The Reverend Father John Luemmen – For service to Aboriginal and migrant welfare.
- Joseph Francis McCaffrey – For service to youth and amateur athletics.
- Lucinda McLean – For service to the community.
- Flight Lieutenant Jonathan Joseph New – For service to youth.
- Nina May Nottage – For service to the handicapped.
- Mary Marguerite Partridge – For service to the community.
- Robert Scott – For service to museums.
- Laurie May Shiels – For service to the community.
- Charles William Smith – For service to the aged and the community.
- Doris Enid Smith – For service to the community.
- Stanley Trevaskus Terrell – For service to the community and the aged.
- Kenneth Barry Thomson – For public service.
- Henry Albert Vaughan – For service to the community and fire safety.
- Pearl Ann Watts – For public service.
- Roy Douglas Weller – For service to local government and the community.

=== Military Division ===
==== Royal Australian Navy ====
- Chief Petty Officer Keith Robert Freemantle
- Chief Petty Officer Donald William Milford

==== Australian Army ====
- Warrant Officer Class Two John Charles Dodd, Royal Australian Infantry.
- Staff Sergeant Lyndon Donald Easton Royal Australian Army Ordnance Corps.
- Sergeant Rosemary Margaret Foxe, Women's Royal Australian Army Corps.
- Staff Sergeant Douglas Gordon Henderson, Royal Australian Army Ordnance Corps.
- Sergeant Robert Ian Maclean, Royal Australian Infantry.
- Staff Sergeant Laurence George Smithson, Royal Australian Infantry.

==== Royal Australian Air Force ====
- Flight Sergeant Barteld Valom.
- Flight Sergeant Kevin Charles Wendt
- Flight Sergeant Richard Noel Wills
- Flight Sergeant Frank Roland Willson

== Royal Red Cross (RRC) ==
=== Associate of the Royal Red Cross (ARRC) ===
- Major Lorna Margaret Finnie, Royal Australian Army Nursing Corps.
- Squadron Leader Margaret Doreen Morrissy, Royal Australian Air Force Nursing Service.

== Air Force Cross (AFC) ==
=== Australian Army ===
- Captain Trevor Jeffrey Hay, Australian Army Aviation Corps.

=== Royal Australian Air Force ===
- Wing Commander Bruce George Grayson
- Flight Lieutenant Desmond Colin Long
- Flight Lieutenant Terence John Marker, Royal Air Force.
- Wing Commander Thomas William O'Brien
- Flight Lieutenant Jeffrey Philip Trappett

== Queen's Commendation for Valuable Service in the Air ==
=== Royal Australian Air Force ===
- Flight Lieutenant Michael Brendon Birks
- Flight Lieutenant Alwyn Thomas Blyth
- Squadron Leader Joseph James Wilson

== Queen's Police Medal ==
For Distinguished Service

- Gordon Law Bruce, Chief Superintendent, Commonwealth Police.
- Robert Henry Gillespie, Superintendent, Commonwealth Police.
- John Rowe, Sergeant, Northern Territory Police.
- Bruce Watt, Inspector, Northern Territory Police.
