= Capela dos Coimbras =

Chapel of the Coimbras
- Chapel of Our Lady of Conception
- Capela dos Coimbras
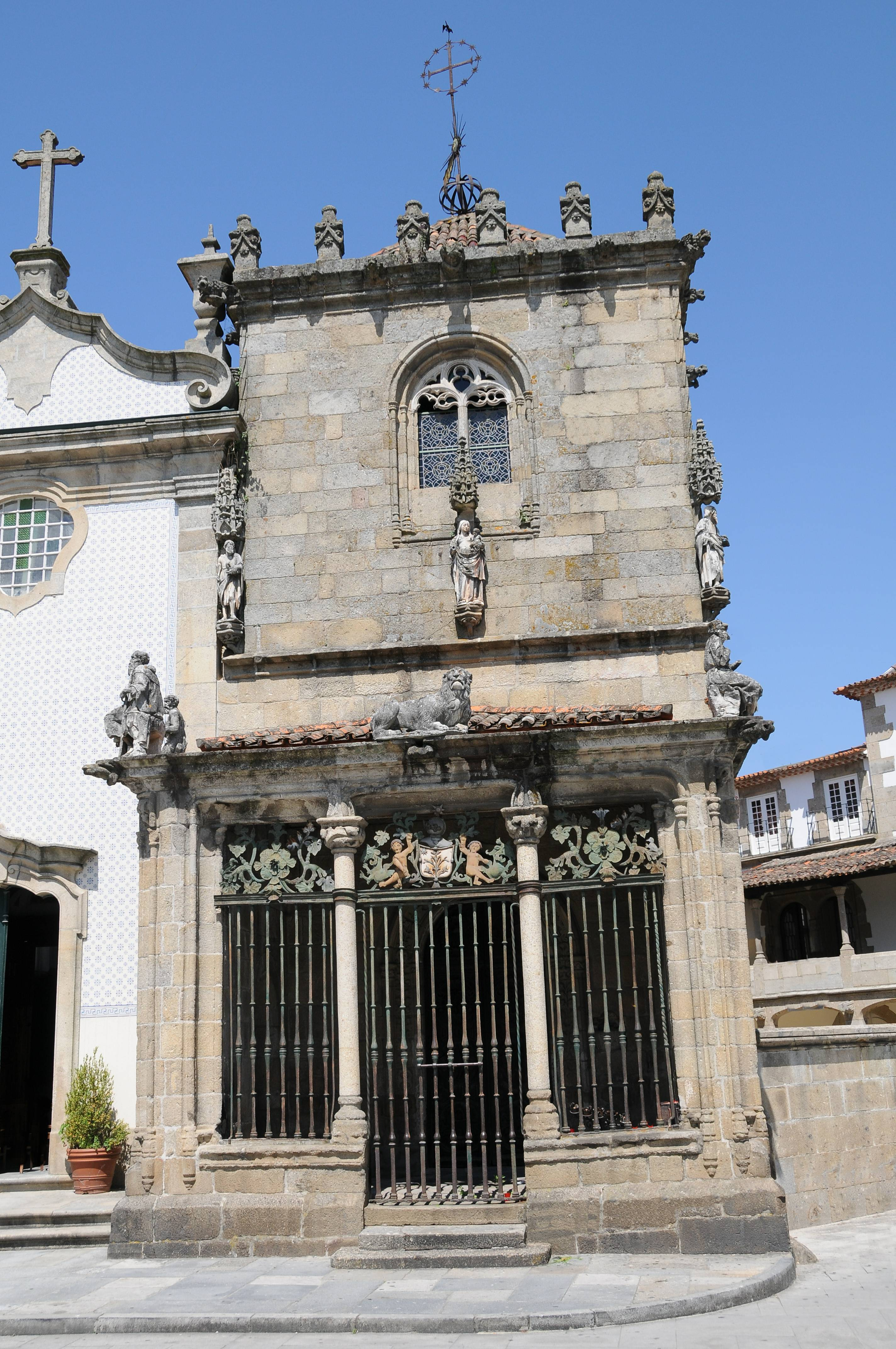
- The Chapel of Coimbras, alongside the Church of São João do Souto (left), considered an extension of the older Church
- Chapel of the Coimbras
- 41°32′59.84″N 8°25′28.98″W
- Location: Braga, Cávado, Norte
- Country: Portugal

Architecture
- Architect: Filipe Odarte
- Style: Manueline
- Years built: c. 1505

Specifications
- Length: 12.25 m (40.2 ft)
- Width: 6.25 m (20.5 ft)

Administration
- Diocese: National Monument

The Chapel of the Coimbras (Portuguese: Capela dos Coimbras) is a Manueline chapel located in the civil parish of São João do Souto, in the municipality of Braga. It has been classified as a National Monument since 1910.

== History ==
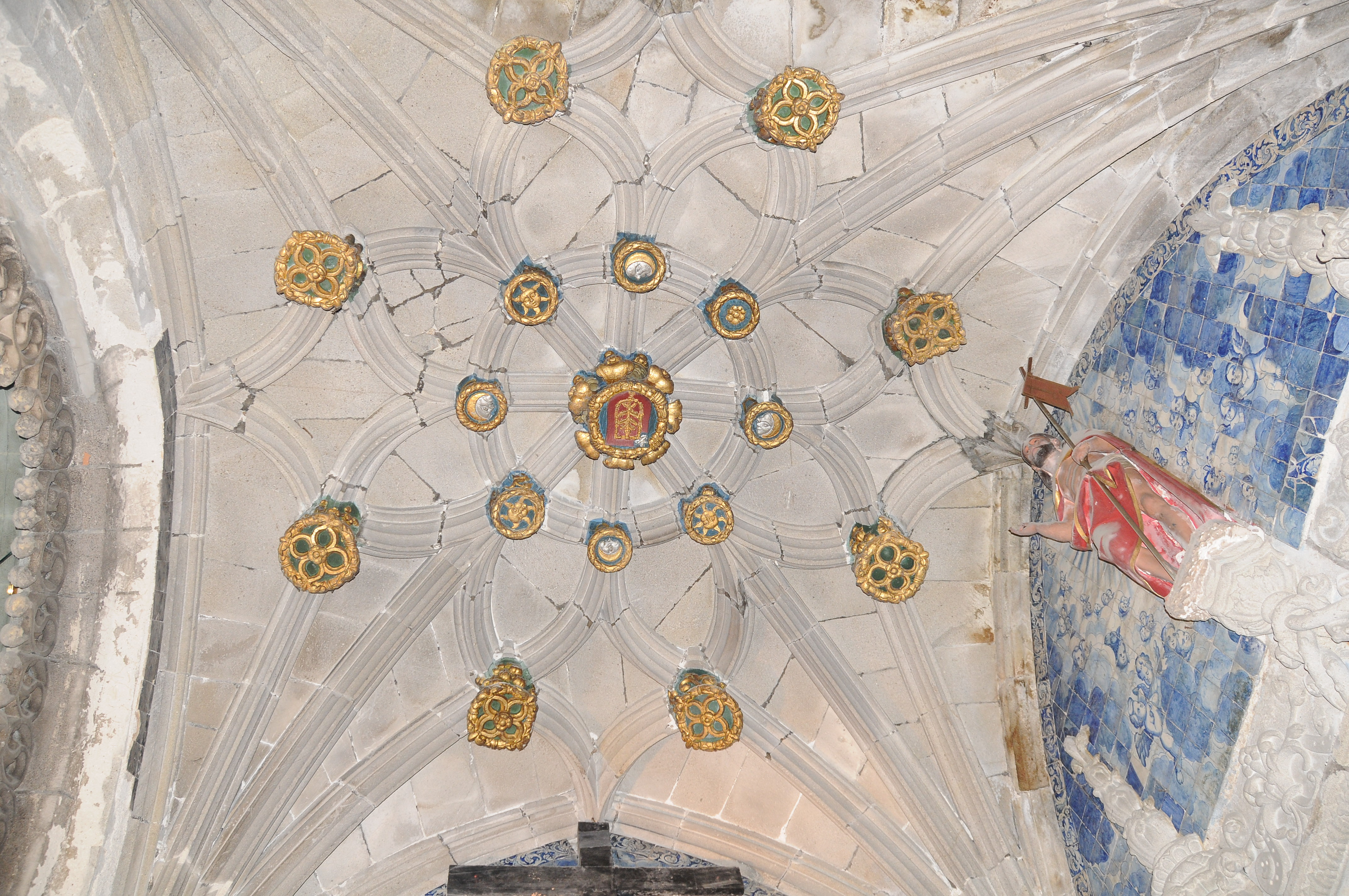
The vaulted-ceiling of the Coimbras Chapel, with the gilded rosettes and central coat-of-arms

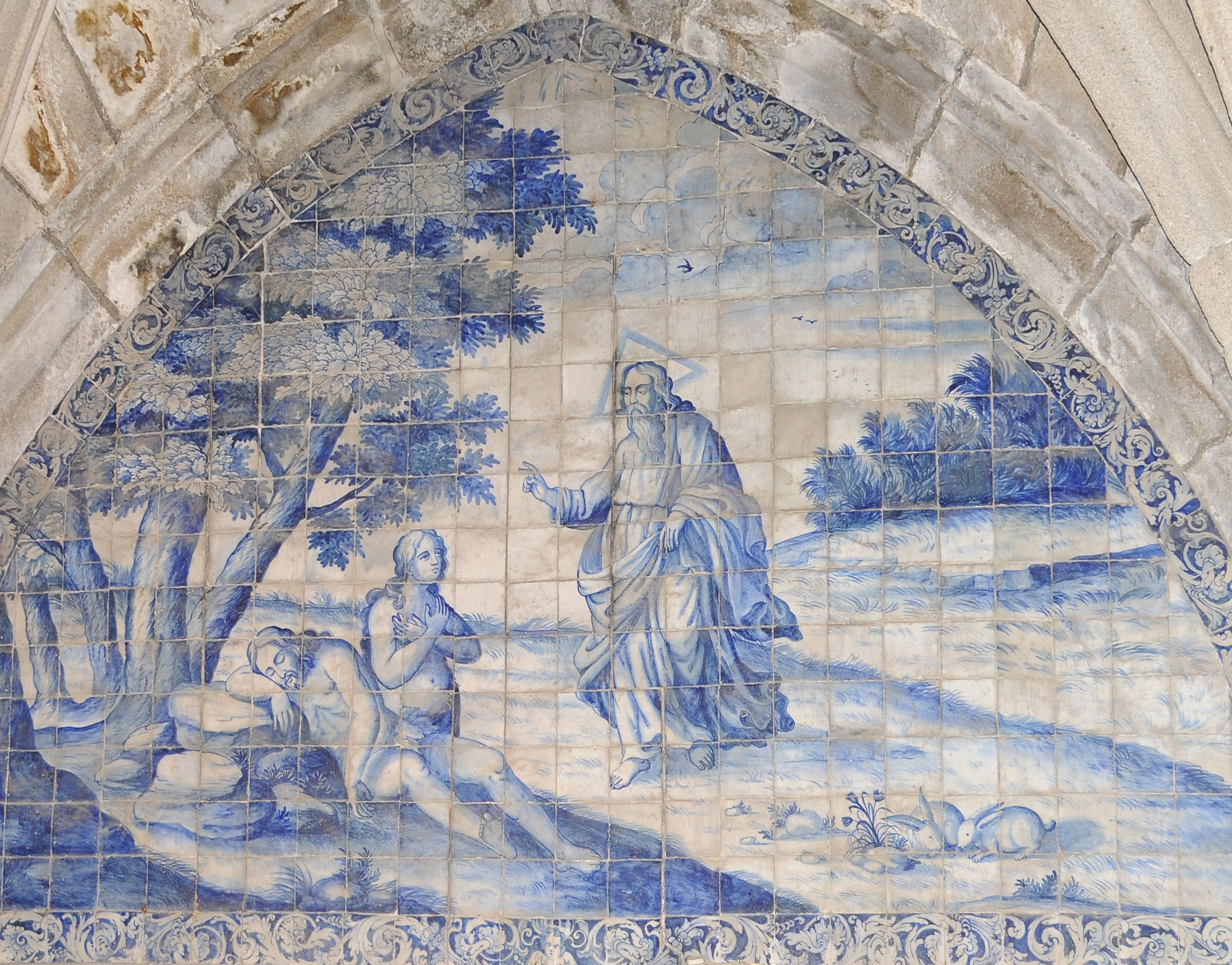
The azulejo tile showing figures of God, Adam and Eve

The chapel had its base in the ecclesiastical residence of the Coimbras family, and its patriarch D. João de Coimbra, who purchased this home in 1505. The provider for the bishopric of Braga, João constructed the chapel between 1525 and 1528, under archbishop D. Diogo de Sousa. It is likely that this chapel was annex of the primitive church of São João do Souto, as one of the lateral chapels. Artists from Biscay were contracted to complete the project while they were working in the medieval city, that included Palace of Biscainhos. These included Filipe Odarte, who was responsible for the main church, and sculptures by Hodart (exterior carvings) and João de Ruão (retable and tomb sculptures), as well as the family coat-of-arms of D. Diogo de Sousa (in the portico). In 1530, a brotherhood was instituted support the services in the chapel.

In 1906, the Palacete of the Coimbras was demolished, due to the redesign of urban space, creating the Largo São João do Souto. The Manueline elements were preserved and a new building was constructed opposite the road. The Casa dos Coimbras retained the windows and a few of the doors from the original structure, while modifying the structure of the Manueline building.

It was classified by IPPAR (a forerunner of the Instituto de Gestão do Património Arquitectónico e Arqueológico (IGESPAR) as a national monument on 16 June 1910. The first interventions occurred in 1936: renovations to the ancient chapel included supporting the walls and reconstruction of the ceiling.

== Architecture ==
The chapel is located in an urban environment within the historic centre of Braga, alongside the Church of São João do Souto, in the civil parish of the same name. It is situated along a road, whose posterior façade faces the Palace of Coimbras, across from the Casa do Passadiço, southeast from the Church of Santa Cruz and Hospital of São Marcos.

It consists of a rectangular tower, covered in ceiling tile, preceded by an enclosed porch supported by elegant Baroque columns with coat-of-arms of the Coimbras family. After the porch is a Romanesque-inspired rounded wooden-door, circled by carved flourishments, while the tower is highlighted by a semi-circular tower window and corbels with baldachins.

The interior ceiling is covered with a ribbed vault and golden rosettes, centred on the arms of House of Lancaster. The high altar is covered in sculptures, located within niches on corbels with awnings. A rounded arch, with the arms of the founder, protect access to the main tomb. The walls are decorated in azulejo tile with figures from the creation of the world, while the pavement is covered in tomb slabs.

Capela and Casa dos Coimbras

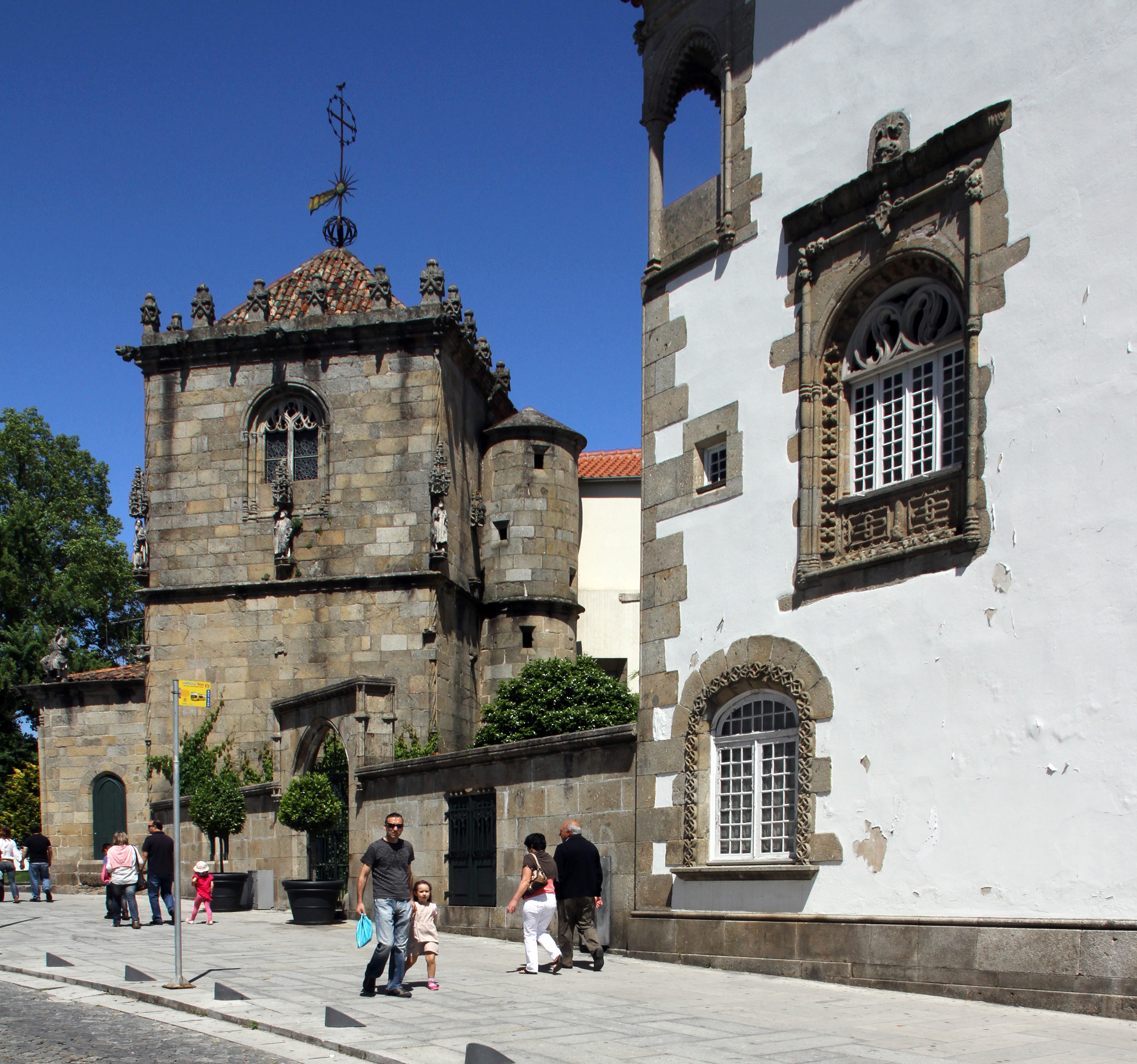
Capela and Casa dos Coimbras

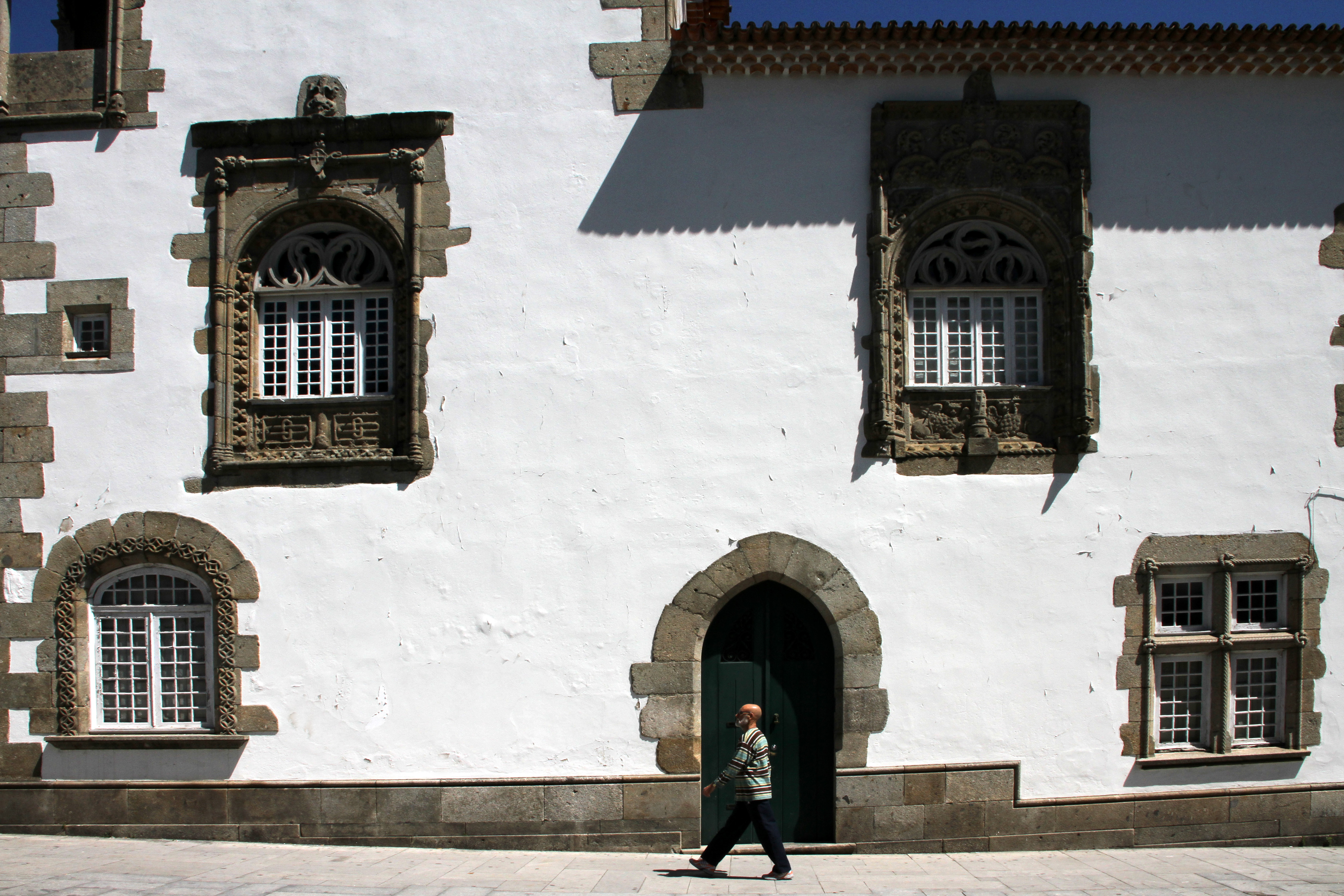
Casa dos Coimbras

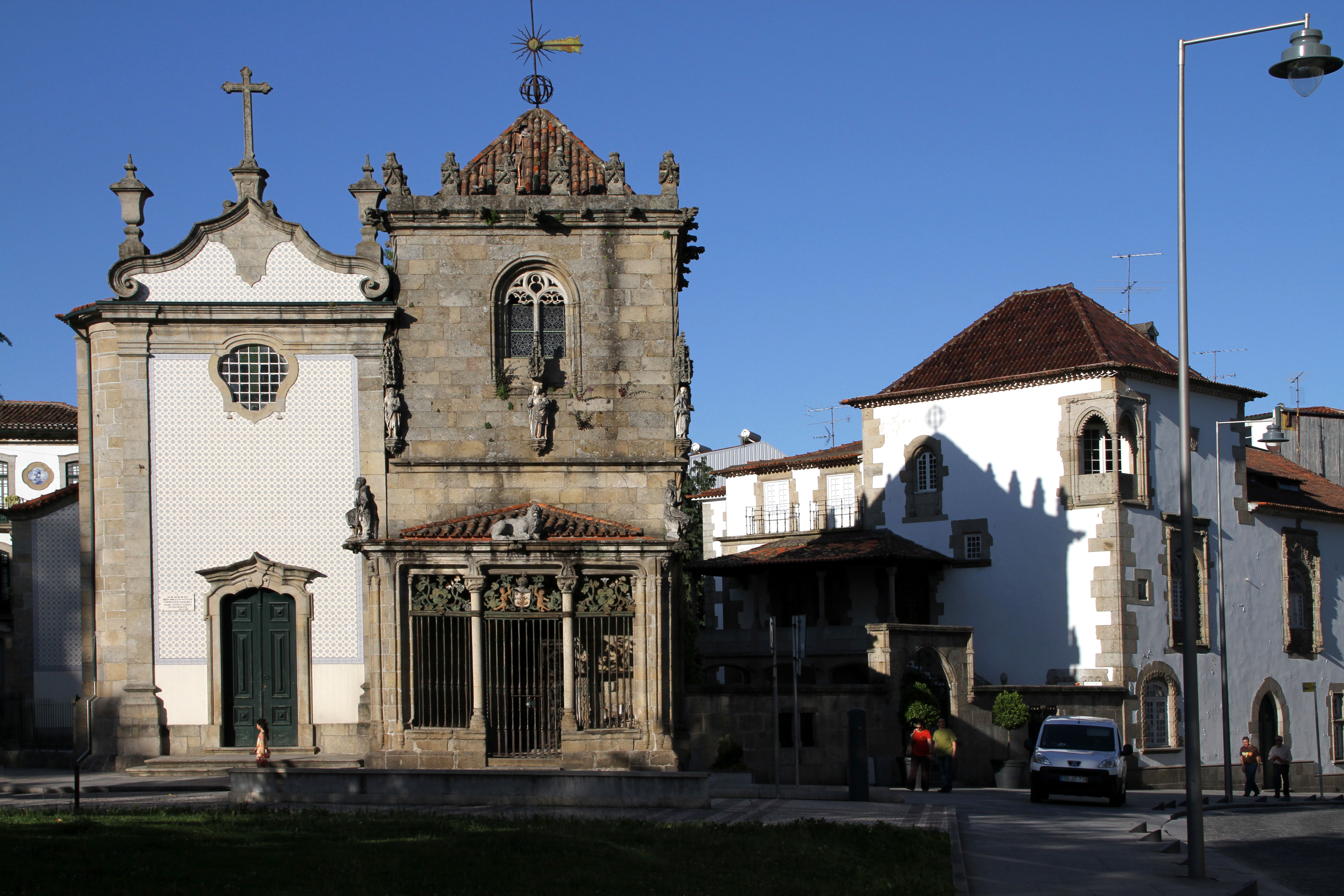
Capela and Casa dos Coimbras

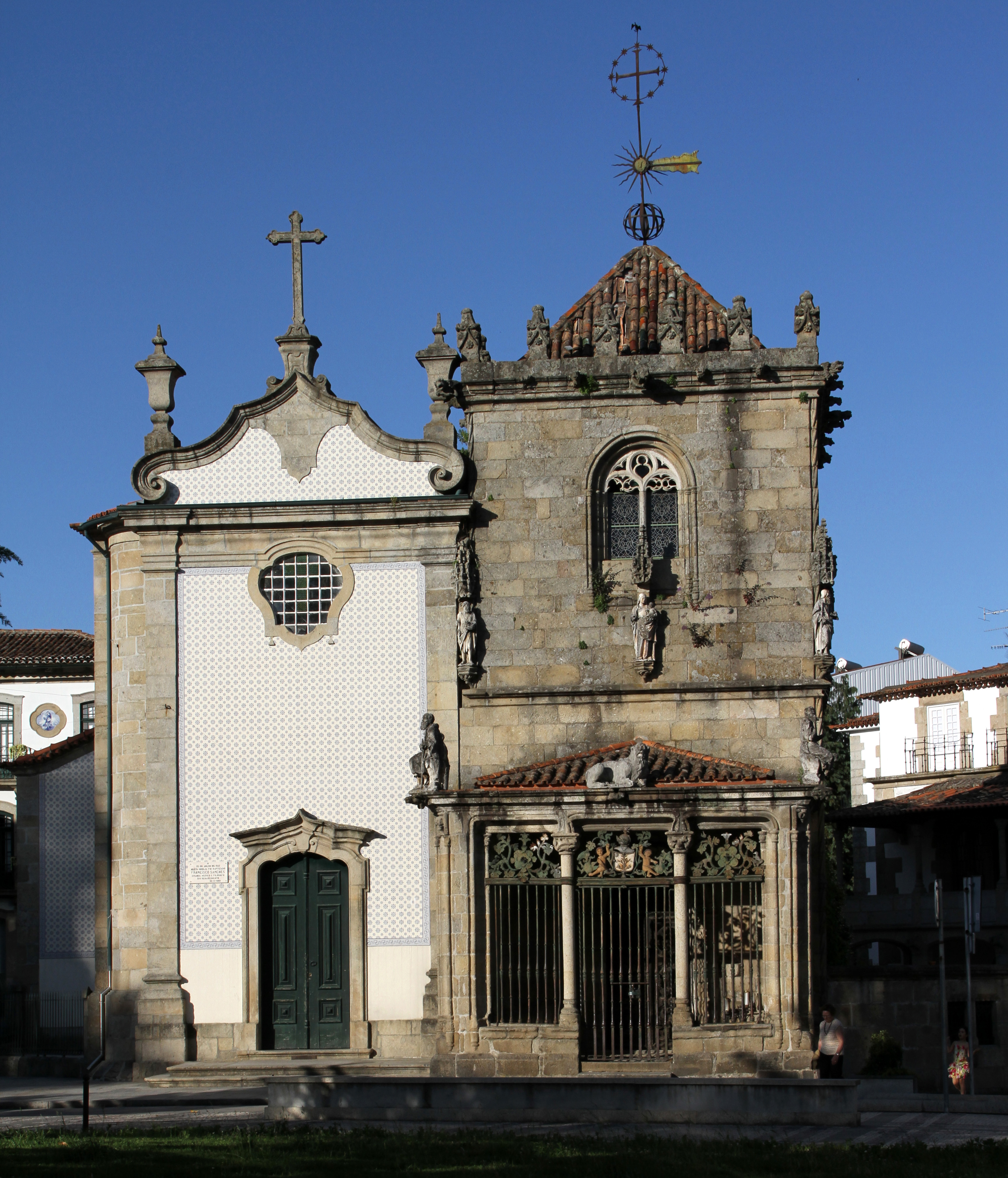
Igreja de São João do Souto and Capela dos Coimbras

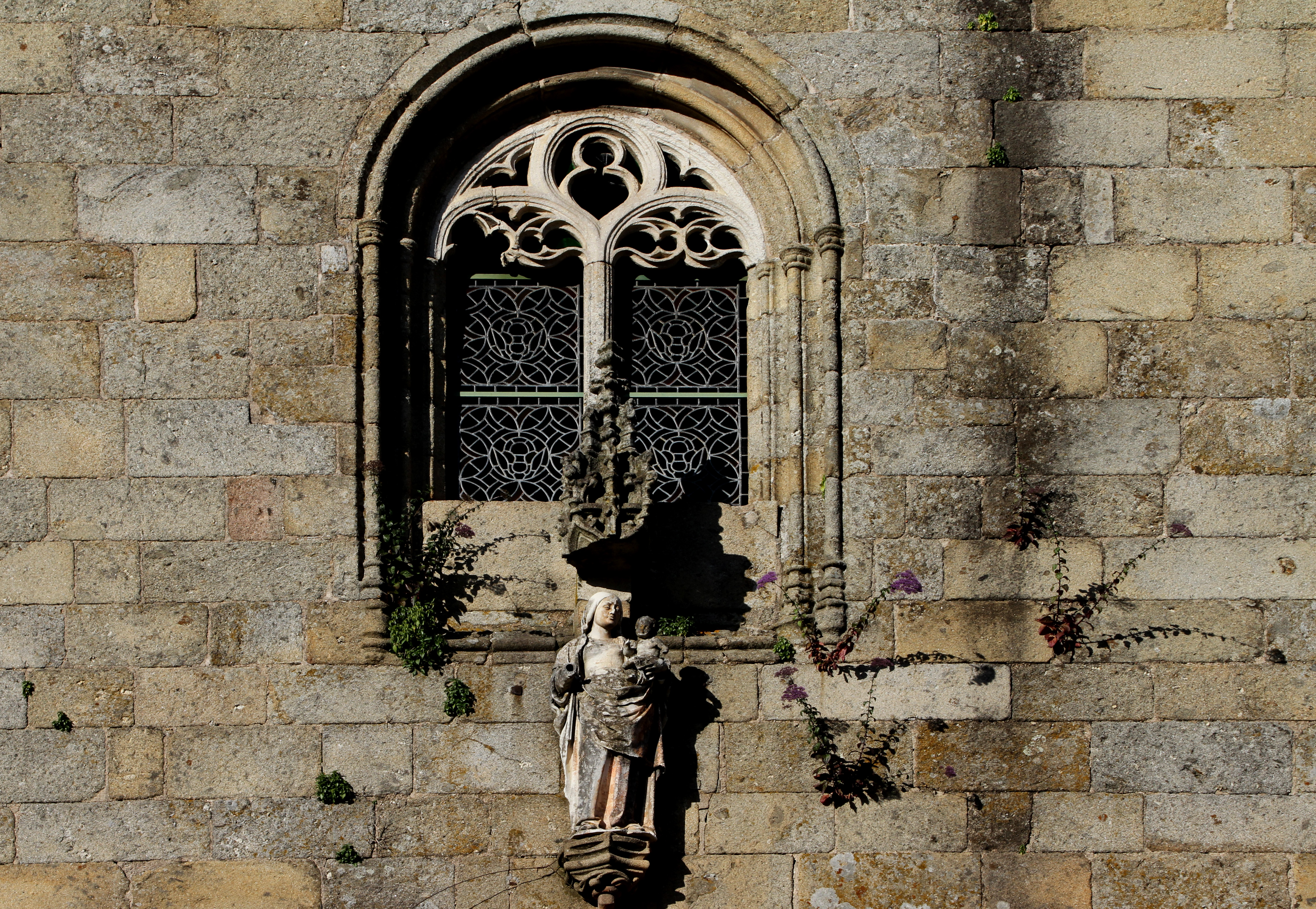
Capela dos Coimbras

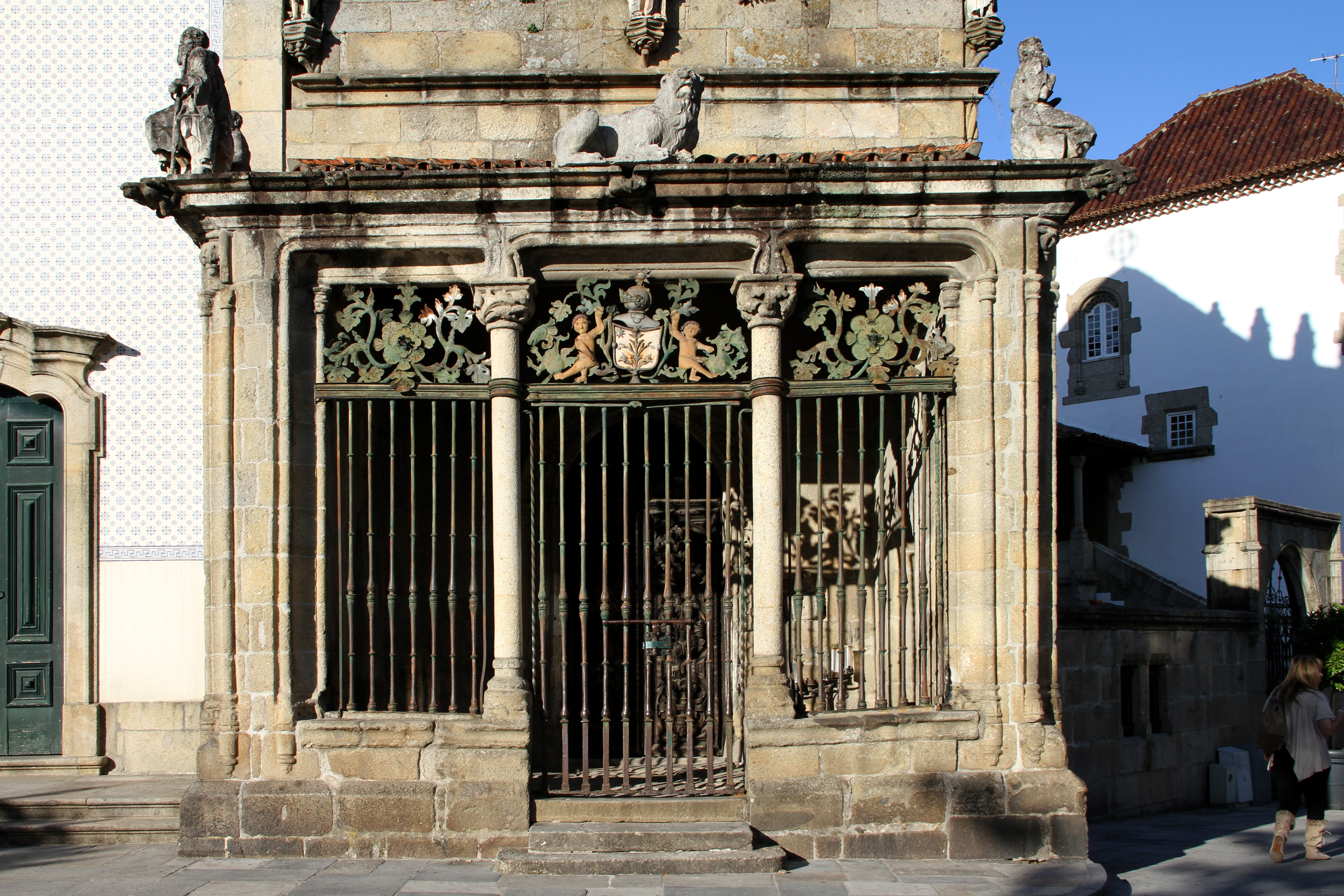
Galilee of the Chapel

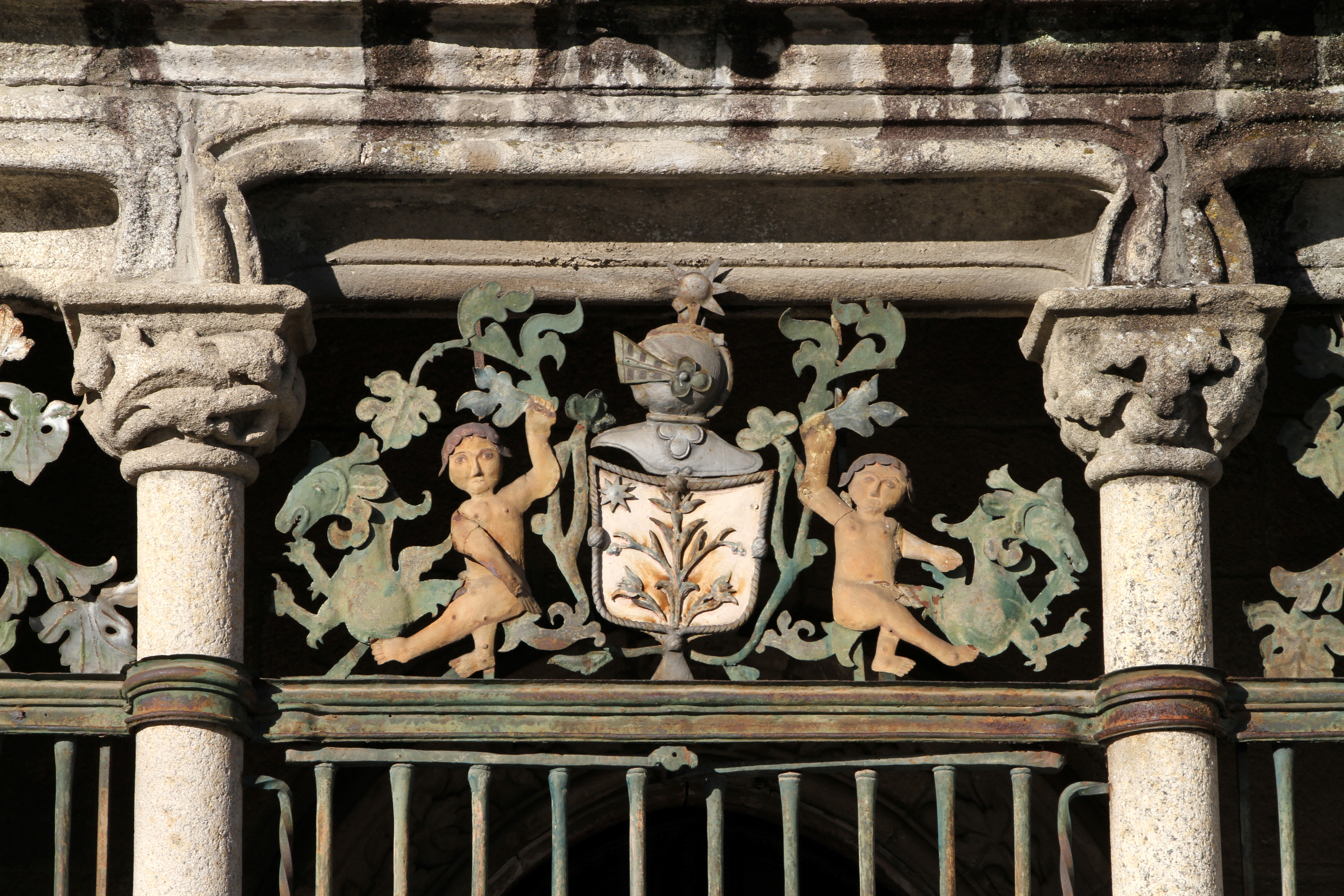
Detail of the galilee

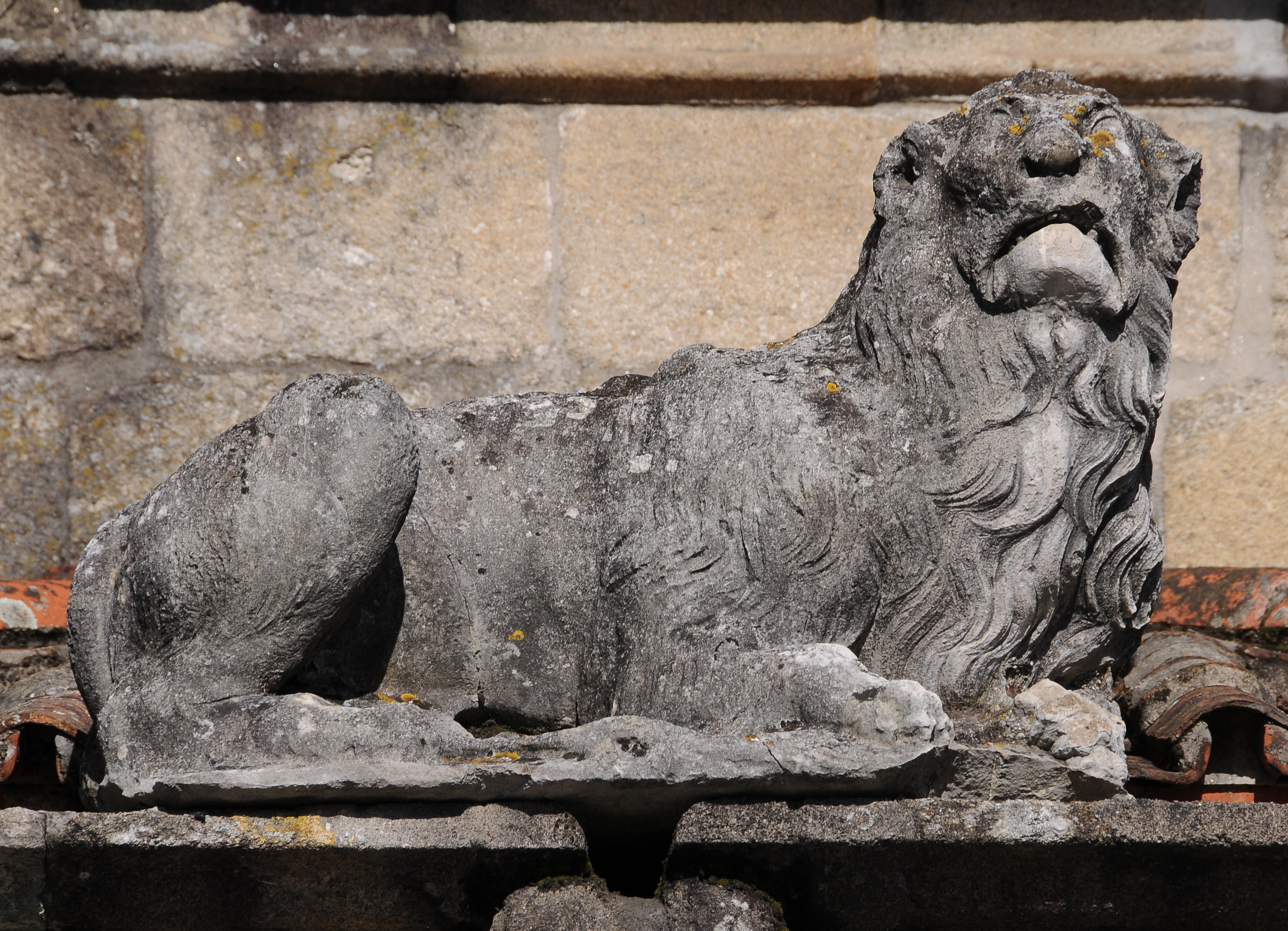
A lion statue in limestone on the galilee

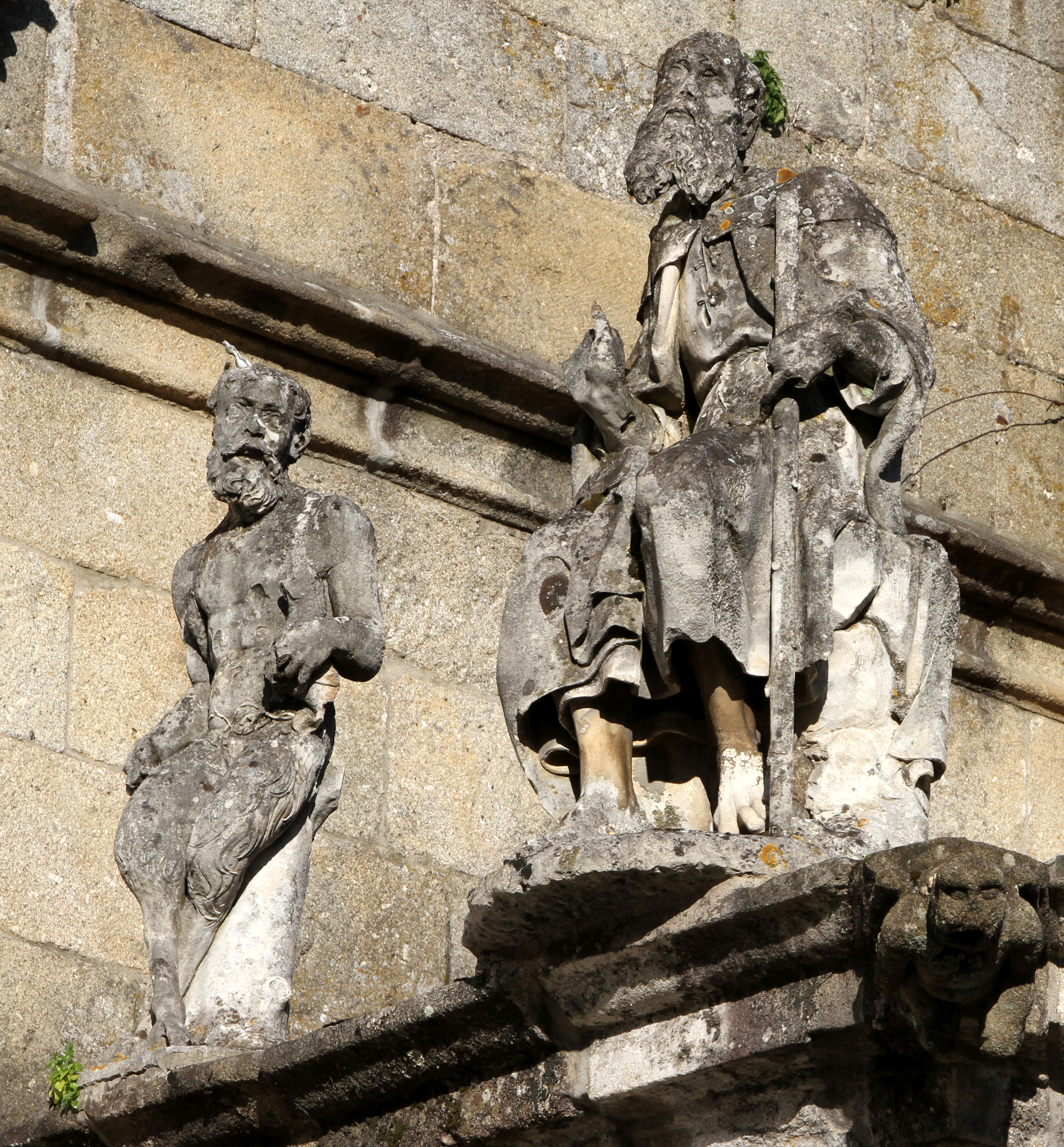
Sculptures by Philippe Hodart on the galilee

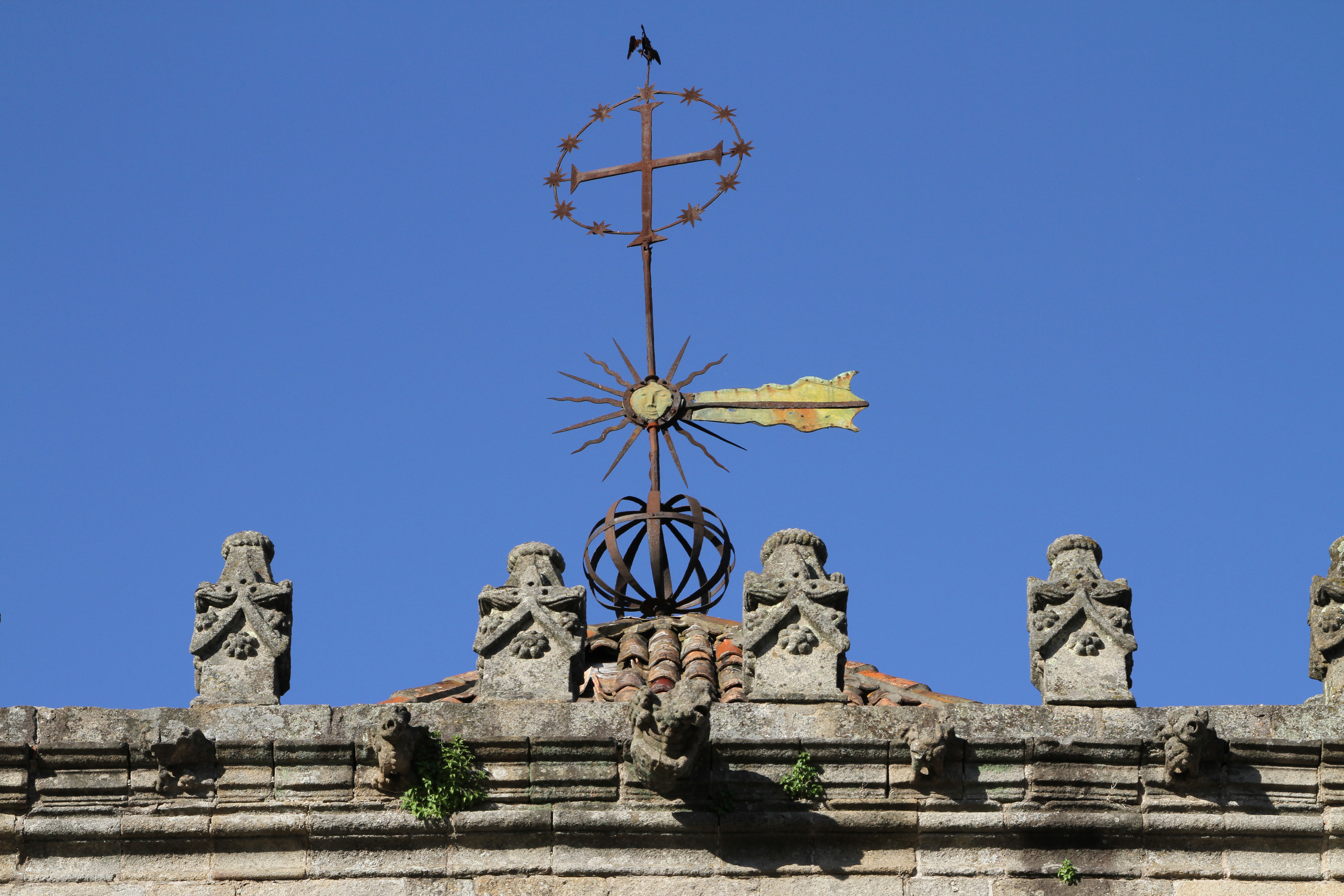
Top of the tower
