= Brazilian ship Brasil =

Brasil is the name of the following ships of the Brazilian Navy

- Brazilian ironclad Brasil, launched in 1864
- Brazilian training ship Brasil, a modified Niterói-class frigate launched in 1983

== See also ==
- Brasil (disambiguation)
- MS Ore Brasil
- SS Brasil, several ships
