= 1968 Special Honours (Australia) =

Honours awarded by the sovereign

The Special Honours Lists for Australia are announced by the Sovereign and Governor-General at any time.

Some honours are awarded by other countries where Queen Elizabeth II was the Head of State, Australians receiving those honours are listed here with the relevant reference.

This list also incorporates the Mid Winters Day honours list and the Bravery honours lists.

== Distinguished Service Order (DSO) ==
Ribbon bar of the Distinguished Service Order

=== Companion of the Distinguished Service Order ===
- Captain Guy Griffiths, DSC, RAN - 23 April 1968
- Brigadier Stuart Clarence Graham, OBE, MC, 253, Australian Staff Corps - 23 April 1968
- Lieutenant-Colonel Eric Harold Smith, 2389, Australian Staff Corps - 20 August 1968
- Lieutenant-Colonel Noel Russell Charles Worth, 235007, Australian Staff Corps - 20 August 1968

== Distinguished Service Cross (DSC) ==
Ribbon bar of the Distinguished Service Cross

- Lieutenant Commander Neil Ralph, RAN - 19 September 1968
- Lieutenant Bruce Colin Crawford, RAN - 19 September 1968

== Military Cross (MC) ==
Ribbon bar of the Military Cross

- Major Brian George Florence, 34373, Australian Staff Corps
- Major (temporary) Ewort John O'Donnell, 235141, Australian Staff Corps - 23 April 1968
- Lieutenant Neville John Clark, A2795S3, Royal Australian Artillery - 23 April 1968
- 2nd Lieutenant Graham Henry Ross, 37277, Australian Staff Corps - 23 April 1968
- 2nd Lieutenant William Francis Hindson, 37479, Australian Staff Corps - 23 April 1968
- Major Peter Mcholson Duckett White, 17042, Australian Staff Corps - 20 August 1968
- Major Peter Raymond Phillips, 47016, Australian Staff Corps - 20 August 1968
- Lieutenant Marcus Richard John, 36768, Australian Staff Corps - 20 August 1968
- Lieutenant Gordon Lyall Simpson, 235306, Australian Staff Corps - 20 August 1968

== Distinguished Conduct Medal (DCM) ==
Ribbon bar of the Distinguished Conduct Medal

- Warrant Officer Class I Alec Henry Morris, 12840, Royal Australian Infantry Corps - 23 April 1968
- Sergeant Alexander Davidson Sutherland, 311323, Royal Australian Infantry Corps - 23 April 1968
- Warrant Officer Class II Reginald Llewellyn Jones, 34888m Royal Australian Infantry Corps - 20 August 1968
- Warrant Officer Class II Daniel John Neville, 11448, Royal Australian Infantry Corps - 20 August 1968
- Warrant Officer Class II Percy White, 2887, Royal Australian Armoured Corps - 20 August 1968
- Sergeant Ronald David Allan, 15229, Royal Australian Infantry Corps - 20 August 1968
- Sergeant (temporary) Jack Woods, 213636, Royal Australian Infantry Corps - 20 August 1968
- Private Richard Leslie Norden, 2412437, Royal Australian Infantry Corps - 20 August 1968

== George Medal (GM) ==
Ribbon bar of the George Medal

- Sergeant (temporary) Ronald Peter Kelly, 61652, Royal Australian Army Ordnance Corps - 23 April 1968

== Distinguished Service Medal (DSM) ==
Ribbon bar of the Distinguished Service Medal

- Leading Seaman Weapons Mechanic William John Young, R56564 - 18 July 1968

== Military Medal (MM) ==
Ribbon bar of the Military Medal

- Warrant Officer Class II (temporary) Kenneth Alfred Richards, 42924, Royal Australian Armoured Corps - 23 April 1968
- Corporal Harold Charles Spradbrow, 214035, Royal Australian Infantry Corps - 23 April 1968
- Private David John Haynes, 1731794, Royal Australian Infantry Corps - 23 April 1968
- Sergeant (temporary) Leslie John Stephens, 215284, Royal Australian Artillery - 20 August 1968
- Corporal James Stuart Archbold, 3790920, Royal Australian Army Provost Corps - 20 August 1968
- Corporal Graham Leslie Griffiths, 2411127, Royal Australian Infantry Corps - 20 August 1968
- Corporal David Joseph Mancer, 4717740, Royal Australian Infantry Corps - 20 August 1968
- Gunner Michael Bernard Williams, 2784697, Royal Australian Artillery - 20 August 1968

== Mentioned in Dispatches ==
Mentioned in dispatches device

- Commander Ivan Raoul Jones, RAN - 24 March 1968
- Lieutenant Commander Robert Graeme Harris, RAN - 24 March 1968
- Captain Pelter Howarth Doyle, RAN - 24 June 1968
- Lieutenant Commander John Bernard Wells, RAN - 24 June 1968
- Lieutenant Commander Patrick John Vickers, RAN - (Posthumous) - 28 August 1968
- Lieutenant John Malvin Leak, RAN - 28 August 1968
- Leading Aircrewman Jeffrey Mclntyre, R93385 - 28 August 1968
- Colonel John Francis White, OBE, 2180, Australian Staff Corps - 24 March 1968
- Major Colin Alexander Coyne, 335047, Royal Australian Artillery - 24 March 1968
- Major Dimitri Richard Kepper, 235055, Royal Australian Armoured Corps - 24 March 1968
- Major Noel John McGuire, 235057, Royal Australian Army Service Corps - 24 March 1968
- Major Desmond Joseph Mealey, 17563, Royal Australian Infantry Corps - 24 March 1968
- Major Kenneth Maurice Batters, 31089, Royal Australian Army Ordnance Corps - 24 March 1968
- Major (temporary) Ross Stuart Buchan, 57050, Royal Australian Artillery - 24 March 1968
- Captain Stefan Abrahamffy, 13123, Royal Australian Engineers - 24 March 1968
- Captain Harold Anthony Duckett White, 216799, Royal Australian Army Medical Corps - 24 March 1968
- Captain Brian Jackson, A129298, Royal Australian Infantry Corps - 24 March 1968
- Captain (temporary) Barry John Caligari, 36587, Royal Australian Infantry Corps - 24 March 1968
- Lieutenant John Patrick Power, 54728, Royal Australian Signals - 24 March 1968
- Second Lieutenant Murray James Fletcher, 1731783, Royal Australian Infantry Corps - 24 March 1968
- Warrant Officer Class I James Patrick Albert Sheddick, 210273, Royal Australian Infantry Corps - 24 March 1968
- Warrant Officer Class II John William Scorse, 35400, Royal Australian Engineers - 24 March 1968
- Warrant Officer Class II John David Opray, 34673, Royal Australian Infantry Corps - 24 March 1968
- Warrant Officer Class II William George Strutton, Royal Australian Army Service Corps - 24 March 1968
- Warrant Officer Class II William Anthony Bade, 52772, Royal Australian Army Provost Corps - 24 March 1968
- Warrant Officer Class II (temporary) John Dennis Phillips, 33712, Royal Australian Engineers - 24 March 1968
- Staff Sergeant Luke John Cherry, 52863, Royal Australian Signals - 24 March 1968
- Staff Sergeant George Wallace Brown, 34629, Royal Australian Infantry Corps - 24 March 1968
- Sergeant Lawrence Edmund Fraser, 53151, Royal Australian Infantry Corps - 24 March 1968
- Sergeant Robert George Armitage, 541086, Royal Australian Infantry Corps - 24 March 1968
- Bombardier Geoffrey John Webster, 38663, Royal Australian Artillery - 24 March 1968
- Corporal Gordon Desmond Tredrea, 38294, Royal Australian Infantry Corps - 24 March 1968
- Corporal Douglas Edward Emblem, 15431, Royal Australian Army Provost Corps - 24 March 1968
- Sapper Robert James Cameron, 378554, Royal Australian Engineers - 24 March 1968
- Private Noel Steward De Grussa, 5411465, Royal Australian Infantry Corps - 24 March 1968
- Private Denis Francis Bathersby, 1200839, Royal Australian Infantry Corps - 24 March 1968
