= Brazill =

Brazill is a surname. Notable people with the surname include:

- Ashleigh Brazill (born 1989), Australian netball player
- Frank Brazill (1899–1976), American baseball player
- LaVon Brazill (born 1989), American football player
- Mark Brazill (born 1962), American television producer
- Nathaniel Brazill (born 1986), American murderer
- Sister Philippa Brazill (1896–1988), Australian nurse

== See also ==
- Brazil (surname)
