= SS Brazil =

SS Brazil or Brasil may refer to:

- SS Drottningholm, completed in 1905 as RMS Virginia, renamed Drottningholm in 1920 and Brasil in 1948.
- SS Brazil (1928), completed in 1928 as SS Virginia, and refitted and renamed as Brazil in 1938.
- SS Brasil (1957), launched in 1957 by Ingalls Shipbuilding. Had numerous later names.

Some ships are spelled with an "s" to match Portuguese spelling of the nation of Brazil.

== See also ==
- Brazilian ship Brasil
- Brazil (disambiguation)
