= Casa dos Crivos =

Residence of the Crivos
- Casa dos Crivos
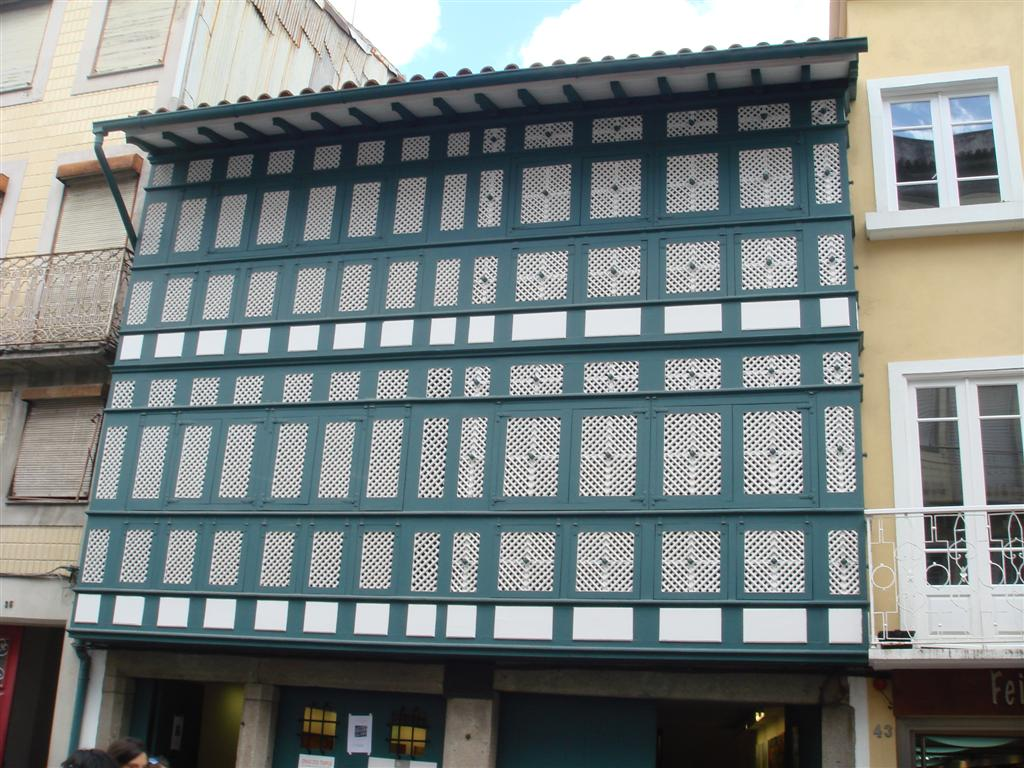
- The front facade of the residence showing the lattice-wood decoration hallmarks of the post-medieval building
- Interactive map of the Residence of the Crivos area

General information
- Type: Residence
- Architectural style: Renaissance
- Location: São João do Souto, Braga, Portugal
- Coordinates: 41°33′0.51″N 8°25′25.13″W
- Opened: 17th century
- Owner: Portuguese Republic

Technical details
- Material: Granite

The Residence of the Crivos (Portuguese: Casa dos Crivos (Sieves House)) is a Renaissance-era shop/residence constructed outside the old walls of Braga, in the civil parish of São João do Souto, municipality of Braga. It is characteristic of late Renaissance architecture and one of the few examples of a building covered in wood-lattice facade from this period.

== History ==
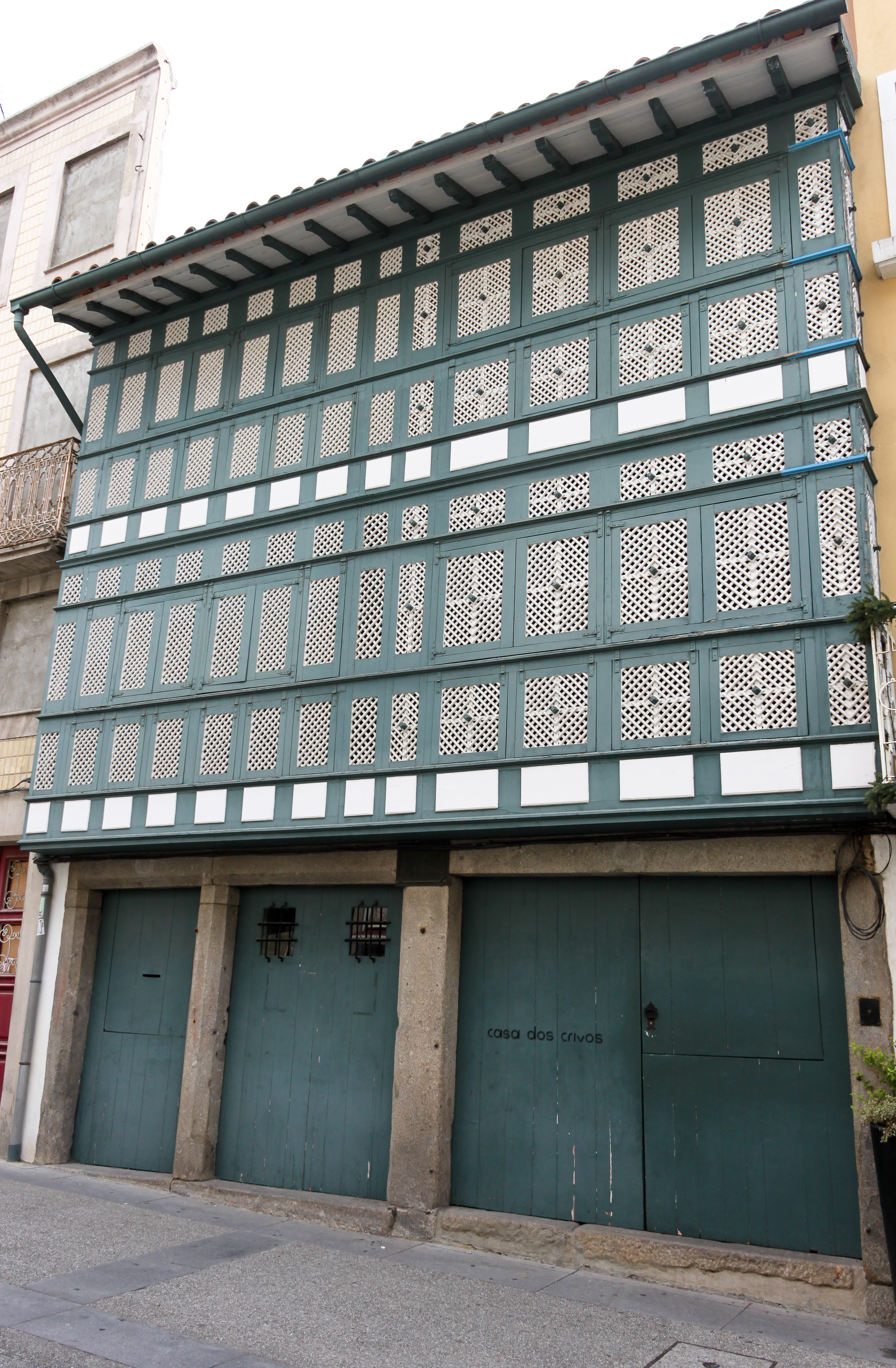
The front facade showing lattice, interior access-ways along the Rua de São Marcos

In the 16th century the Rua de São Marcos, which consisted of the area beyond the city of Braga, was opened by order of archbishop D. Diogo de Sousa. It was not until the 17th century that the building was likely constructed.

In 1971 the residence was classified as the Residences of the Gelosias (Portuguese: Casas das Gelosias), indicating that possibility that the building was divided structurally by several proprietors.

In 1980, the property was acquired by the Municipal Council to install the History Museum of Braga (Portuguese: Museu de História da Imagem de Braga). At that time (1982 specifically) public works were begun to remodel and adapt the building for its new role. On 17 January 1984, Prime Minister Mário Soares, inaugurated the residence with a plaque: AS OBRAS DE RESTAURO DA / CASA DOS CRIVOS, FORAM / INAUGURADAS POR SUA / EXCELÊNCIA O SENHOR / PRIMEIRO MINISTRO / DR. MÁRIO SOARES / 17-2-1984 (The restoration works of the Residence of the Crivos, were inaugurated by His Excellency, Prime Minister Doctor Mário Soares (17 February 1984).

By 1997, the building was already being recuperated: in the interior and exterior surfaces experienced restoration, and in 1999 the interior was repainted.

== Architecture ==
The residence is part of the many buildings that abut the southern part of the Rua de São Marcos, a road that is heavily trafficked by pedestrians (the road is prohibited to automobile traffic).

It has a simple longitudinal, rectangular plan with a vertical volume extending to three floors, with a differentiate covering in tile. The principal facade (oriented to the northwest) includes three entrances, covered in wood doors. The facade of the second and third floors are totally covered in wood-lattice painted in white, while the box frames are painted green. This type of covering/window was utilized during the 17th century by many families in Braga, a town considered conservative, as a means of safeguarding privacy in a religiously conservative town.

The rear facade of the building, facing the courtyard is whitewashed, accessible by exterior door. In addition to a single rectangular window on the first floor rear courtyard, the second floor includes rectangular door, while on the third-floor four guillotine-style windows.

The interior is whitewashed, with the first-floor ceiling in stucco and wood, while the floors are covered in tiles (except in the remain floors which are covered in wood flooring). There is a wood staircase that links the successive floors. The first floor include hall for expositions, washrooms and two offices; the second floor space has an ample space for expositions and amphitheatre-like auditorium; and the third floor is used for offices and storage.
