= Brazil (surname) =

Brazil is a surname. Notable people with the surname include:

- Alan Brazil (born 1959), Scottish broadcaster and former football player
- Angela Brazil (1868–1947), English author
- Bobo Brazil (1924–1998), American wrestler
- Brodie Brazil (born 1981), American sportscaster
- Darren Brazil (born 1984), American TV editor, producer and videographer.
- David Brazil (disambiguation), various people
- Derek Brazil (born 1968), Irish footballer
- Ellie Brazil (born 1999), English footballer
- Gary Brazil (born 1962), English footballer
- John R. Brazil (1946–2022), American professor
- Mark Brazil (born 1955), English ornithologist, conservationist, author and journalist

== See also ==
- Brasil (surname)
- Brazile
- Brazill
