= Bica (coffee) =

Style of coffee common in Portugal

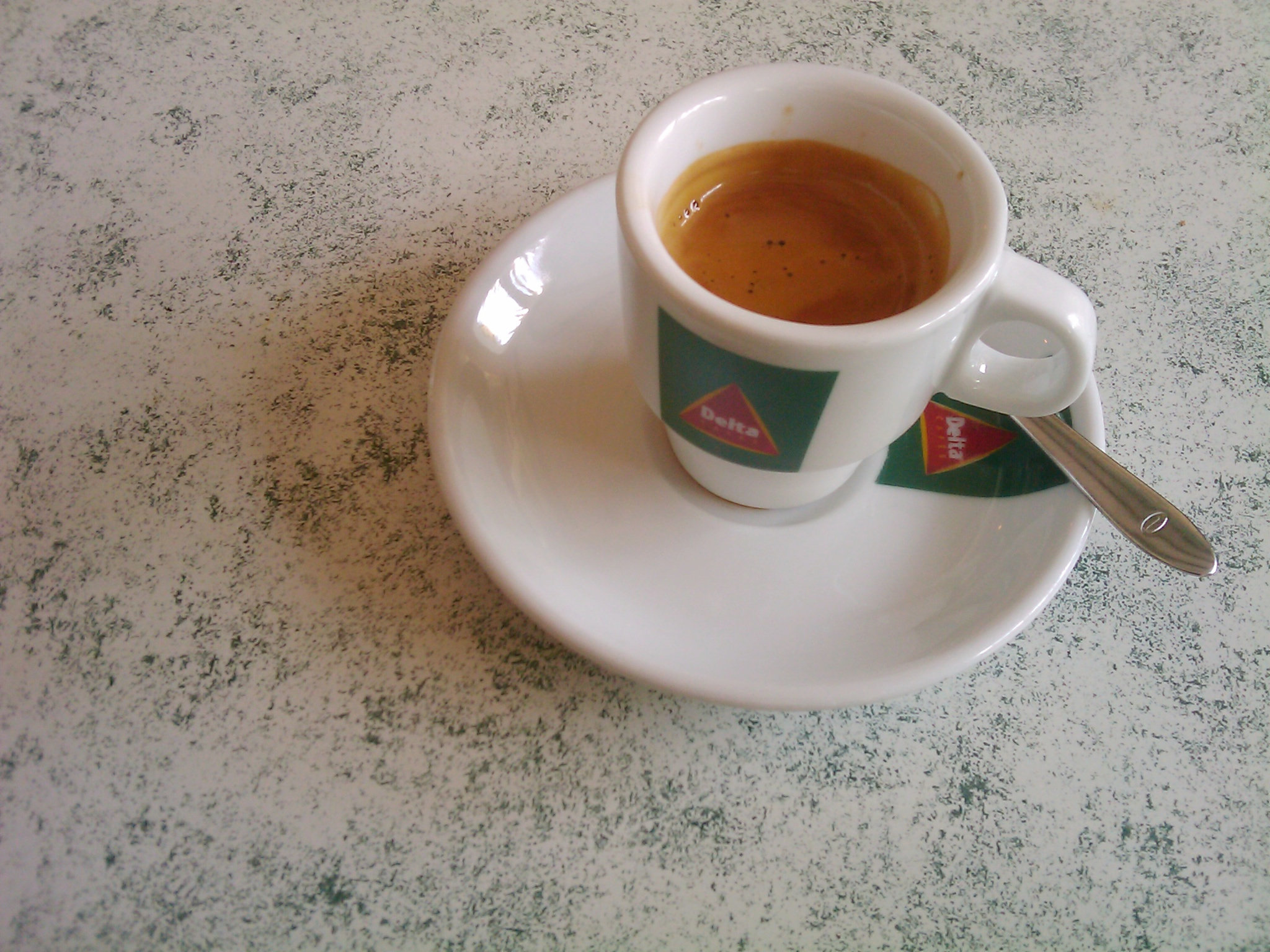
- A bica coffee from Faro, Portugal
- Type: Beverage
- Place of origin: Portugal
- Main ingredients: Light roast coffee beans, water

Bica is the term commonly used in certain areas of Portugal for a café ('coffee' in Portuguese) that is similar to espresso, but extracted to a greater volume than its Italian counterpart (akin to a lungo in Italy) and a little bit smoother in taste, due to the Portuguese roasting process being slightly lighter than the Italian one.

In almost all regions in Portugal, it is simply called um café ('a coffee' in Portuguese) and always served in a demitasse cup.

The name bica originates from the way the coffee flows, falling from the espresso machine to the cup on the tray, an analogy with a water spring or fountain; both can also be called bica in Portuguese.

== History ==
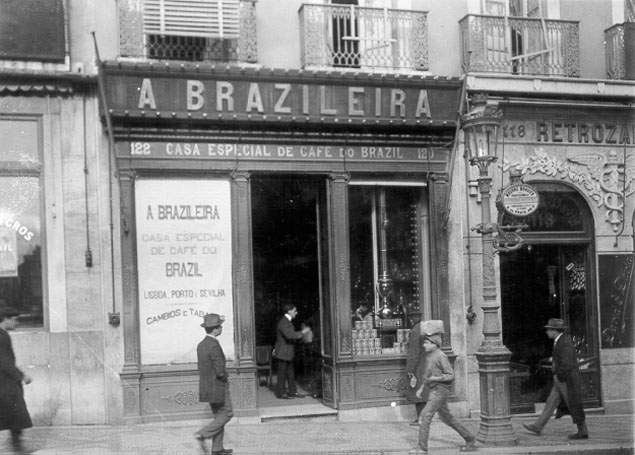
Lisbon's Café A Brasileira in 1911, before its 1920s Art Deco renovation

The Café A Brasileira coffeehouse was opened in Lisbon by Adriano Telles on 19 November 1905 at No.122 (an old shirt shop), to sell "genuine Brazilian coffee" from the Brazilian state of Minas Gerais, a product generally unappreciated in homes of Lisboetas of that period. In order to promote his product, Telles offered each shopper who bought a kilogram of ground coffee (for 720 réis) a free cup of coffee. It was the first shop to sell the bica, a small cup of strong coffee, similar to espresso, with fresh goat milk from nearby farms.
