= Brazilian =

Brazilian commonly refers to:

- Brazil, a country
- Brazilians, its people
- Brazilian Portuguese, its dialect

Brazilian may also refer to:

- "The Brazilian", a 1986 instrumental music piece by Genesis
- Brazilian Café, Baghdad, Iraq (1937 – c. 2003)
- Brazilian cuisine
  - Churrasco, or Brazilian barbecue
- Brazilian-cut bikini, a swimsuit revealing the buttocks
- Brazilian waxing, a style of pubic hair removal
- Mamelodi Sundowns F.C., a South African football club nicknamed The Brazilians

== See also ==
- Brazil (disambiguation)
- Brasileira (disambiguation)
- Brasileiro, a 1992 album by Sergio Mendes
- Brazilian jiu-jitsu, a martial art and combat sport system
- Culture of Brazil
- Football in Brazil
