= Café A Brasileira (Braga) =

The Brazilian Cafe
- Café A Brasileira
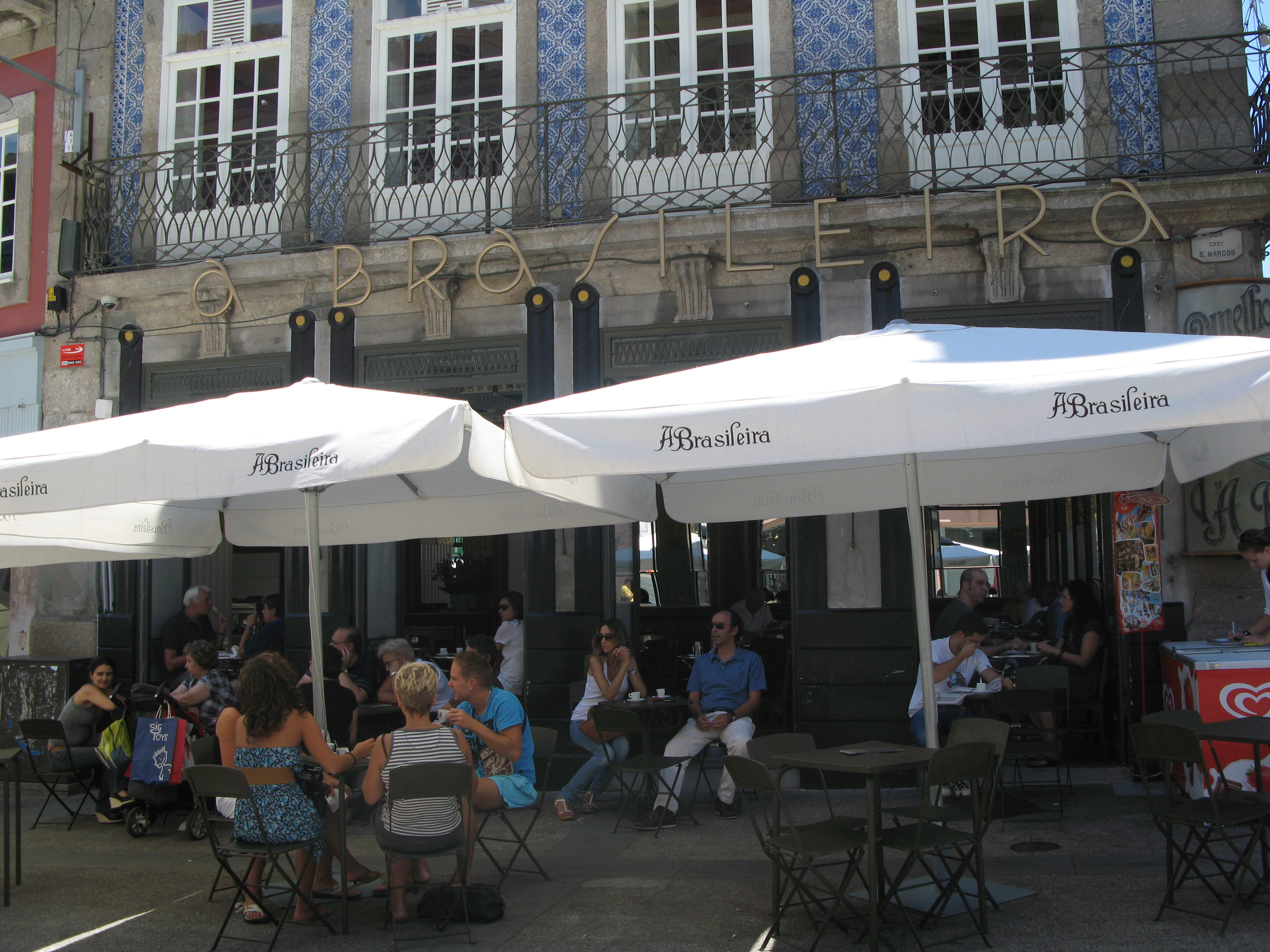
- The front facade in azulejo tile, and public esplanada of Largo Barão de São Martinho
- Interactive map of the The Brazilian Cafe area

General information
- Type: Café
- Location: Braga (São José de São Lázaro e São João do Souto), Braga, Portugal
- Coordinates: 41°33′2.99″N 8°25′24.70″W
- Opened: c. 1907
- Owner: Armindo Pinheiro

Website
- https://abrasileira.eatbu.com/

The Café A Brasileira (The Brazilian Cafe) is a café situated along the Largo Barão de São Martinho, in the civil parish of Braga (São José de São Lázaro e São João do Souto), in the historic Portuguese municipality of the same name.

== History ==
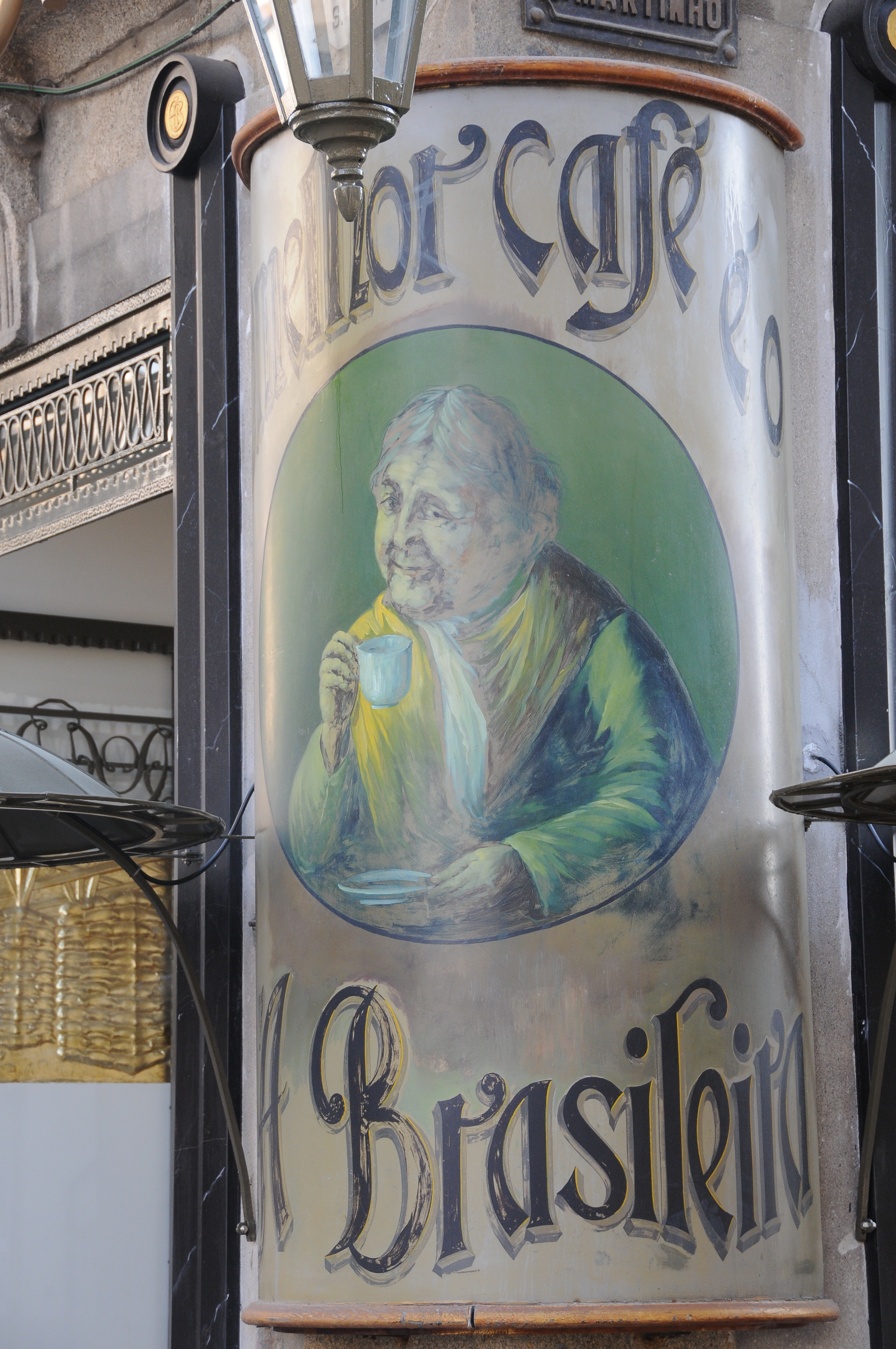
The traditional marquee of the café/coffee-shop, with image of Adolpho de Azevedo

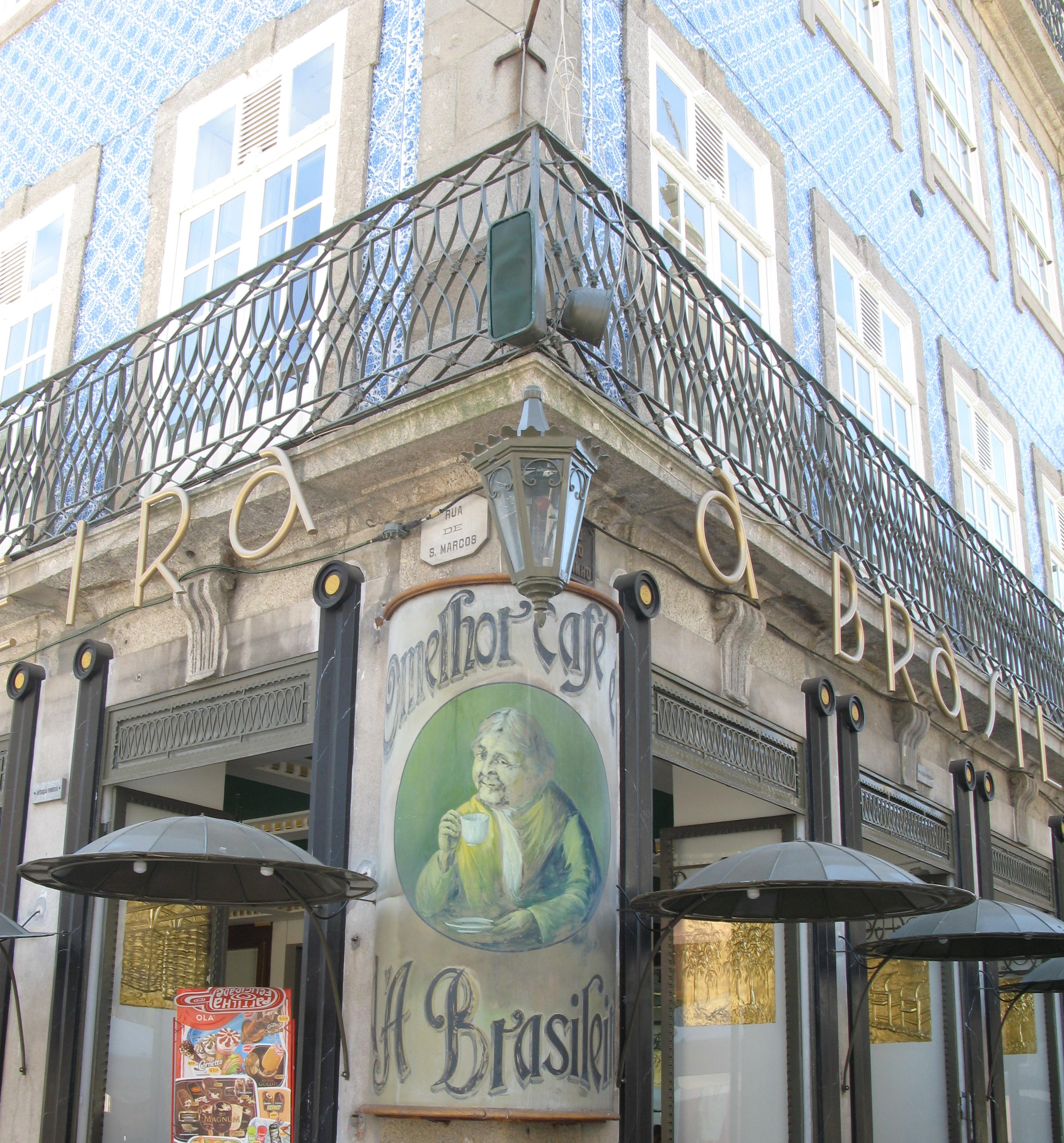
The café, on the corner of Rua de São Marcos and Largo do Barão de São Martinho

The café first opened on 17 March 1907, a franchise of the already existing cafés named the Brazilian by Adolpho de Azevedo, a Portuense merchant and Vice-Counsel to Brazil. This new incarnation of the popular café opened on the corner of the Largo do Barão de São Martinho and Rua de São Marcos, and included not just coffee beans, but also fine wines bottled by the Parceria Vinícola dos Lavradores do Douro (Farmer's Winery Partnership of the Douro). In order to attract clients to his wholesale coffee-shop, Azevedo continued the tradition that started in Lisbon with A Brasileira: he offered a cup of coffee, with the purchase of a .5 kilograms (1.1 lb) of coffee beans.

Adolpho de Azevedo ran the establishment for 30 years, until it was acquired by Joaquim Queirós in 1937, who continued to operate the establishment for another four decades. Queirós maintained, and then integrated the neighbouring coffeehouse (Café Sport) which was located in the lower part of the neighbouring building, into A Brasileira.

During the Estado Novo regime (1933–1974), a rival café, called Nova Brasileira opened on the opposite corner of the coffeehouse. It was during this time that A Brasileira became the centre of anti-Salazarist opposition to the regime, and the Nova Brasileira was visited by those loyal to the regime.

In 1997, the café came into the possession of Joaquim Domingos Godinho, who operated the establishment until 2004, when Armindo Pinheiro and his sons became the property-owners.

The café reopened in 2009, following extensive remodelling begun in September 2008, under the auspices of ASAE Autoridade para a Segurança Alimentar e Económica (Food and Economic Security Authority); the renovation included work in kitchen and necessary replacement of the old wood beams with stainless steel frames.
