= David Brazil =

David Brazil may refer to:

- Dave Brazil (American football) (1936–2017), American football coach
- David Brazil (politician) (born 1963), Canadian politician
- David Brazil (promoter) (born 1969), Brazilian event promoter and television personality
