= Brazil, Iowa =

- Unincorporated community
- Location within Iowa
- Coordinates: 40°45′29″N 92°57′16″W
- Country: United States
- State: Iowa
- County: Appanoose
- Elevation: 994 ft (303 m)
- Time zone: UTC-6 (Central (CST))
  - Summer (DST): UTC-5 (CDT)
- Area code: 641
- GNIS feature ID: 454810

Brazil (formerly Brazile) is an unincorporated community in Appanoose County, Iowa, United States.

== History ==
Brazil was historically noted for its coal mining. The community contained at least three mines. The population was 525 in 1940.
