= Guy Griffiths (admiral) =

Royal Australian Navy officer (1923–2024)

- Born: 1 March 1923; Sydney, New South Wales, Australia
- Died: 5 March 2024 (aged 101)
- Education: Royal Australian Naval College
- Military career
- Allegiance: Australia
- Branch: Royal Australian Navy
- Service years: 1937–1980
- Rank: Rear Admiral
- Commands: Naval Support Command (1979–80); HMAS Melbourne (1973–75); HMAS Hobart (1965–67); HMAS Parramatta (1961–63)
- Conflicts: Second World War; Hunt for Bismarck; Sinking of Prince of Wales and Repulse; Battle of Leyte Gulf; Battle of Surigao Strait; Battle of Lingayen Gulf; Korean War; Vietnam War
- Awards: Officer of the Order of Australia; Distinguished Service Order; Distinguished Service Cross

Rear Admiral Guy Richmond Griffiths, AO, DSO, DSC (1 March 1923 – 5 March 2024) was a senior officer of the Royal Australian Navy. After serving in the Second World War and surviving the sinking of HMS Repulse in 1941, he served in the Korean and Vietnam wars. He was Chief of Naval Personnel and Flag Officer Naval Support Command in the 1970s.

== Early life and education ==
Griffiths was born in Sydney, New South Wales, on 1 March 1923, and grew up in the Hunter Valley of New South Wales. He entered the Royal Australian Naval College as a cadet midshipman in 1937.

== Naval career ==
After graduation, Griffiths was posted to the Royal Navy for further training and joined the battle cruiser HMS Repulse. He survived the sinking of the Repulse by Japanese air attack on 10 December 1941. He served on several ships later in the Second World War. He was promoted to lieutenant in 1944 and awarded the Distinguished Service Cross in May 1945 "For gallantry, skill and devotion to duty while serving in HMS Shropshire in the successful assault operations in the Lingayen Gulf, Luzon Island."

Griffiths saw service as Gunnery Officer on HMAS Sydney in the Korean War and commanded the guided missile destroyer HMAS Hobart in the Vietnam War. As commander of HMAS Melbourne, he assisted in relief operations in Darwin after Cyclone Tracy hit in 1974. In 1976 he was promoted to rear admiral and appointed Chief of Naval Personnel. In January 1979 he took up his final posting as the Flag Officer Naval Support Command. He retired in 1980.

== Later career ==
Griffiths was personnel director of Wormald International from 1980 to 1983 and was the national president of the Australian Veterans and Defence Services Council from 1980 to 2004. He died on 5 March 2024, at the age of 101.

== Honours ==
Griffiths received the Distinguished Service Cross (DSC) in May 1945, and was appointed a Companion of the Distinguished Service Order (DSO) in May 1968.

He was appointed an Officer of the Order of Australia (AO) in the 1979 Queen's Birthday Honours "for service to the Royal Australian Navy over a period of forty-two years and particularly as Chief of Naval Personnel."

== Bibliography ==
- Jones, Peter (2021). Guy Griffiths: The Life & Times of an Australian Admiral. North Melbourne: Arcadia. ISBN 9781922454676.
