= Brazil, Missouri =

Extinct town in the American state of Missouri

- Former community
- Location within Missouri Location within the United States
- Coordinates: 37°50′46″N 91°03′48″W
- Country: United States
- State: Missouri
- County: Washington
- Time zone: UTC-6 (Central (CST))
  - Summer (DST): UTC-5 (CDT)
- GNIS feature ID: 749006

Brazil is an extinct town in Washington County, in the U.S. state of Missouri. The GNIS classifies it as a populated place.

A post office called Brazil was established in 1889, and remained in operation until 1955. It is unknown why the name "Brazil" was applied to this community.
