= Café A Brasileira =

Café in Lisbon, in the old quarter Chiado

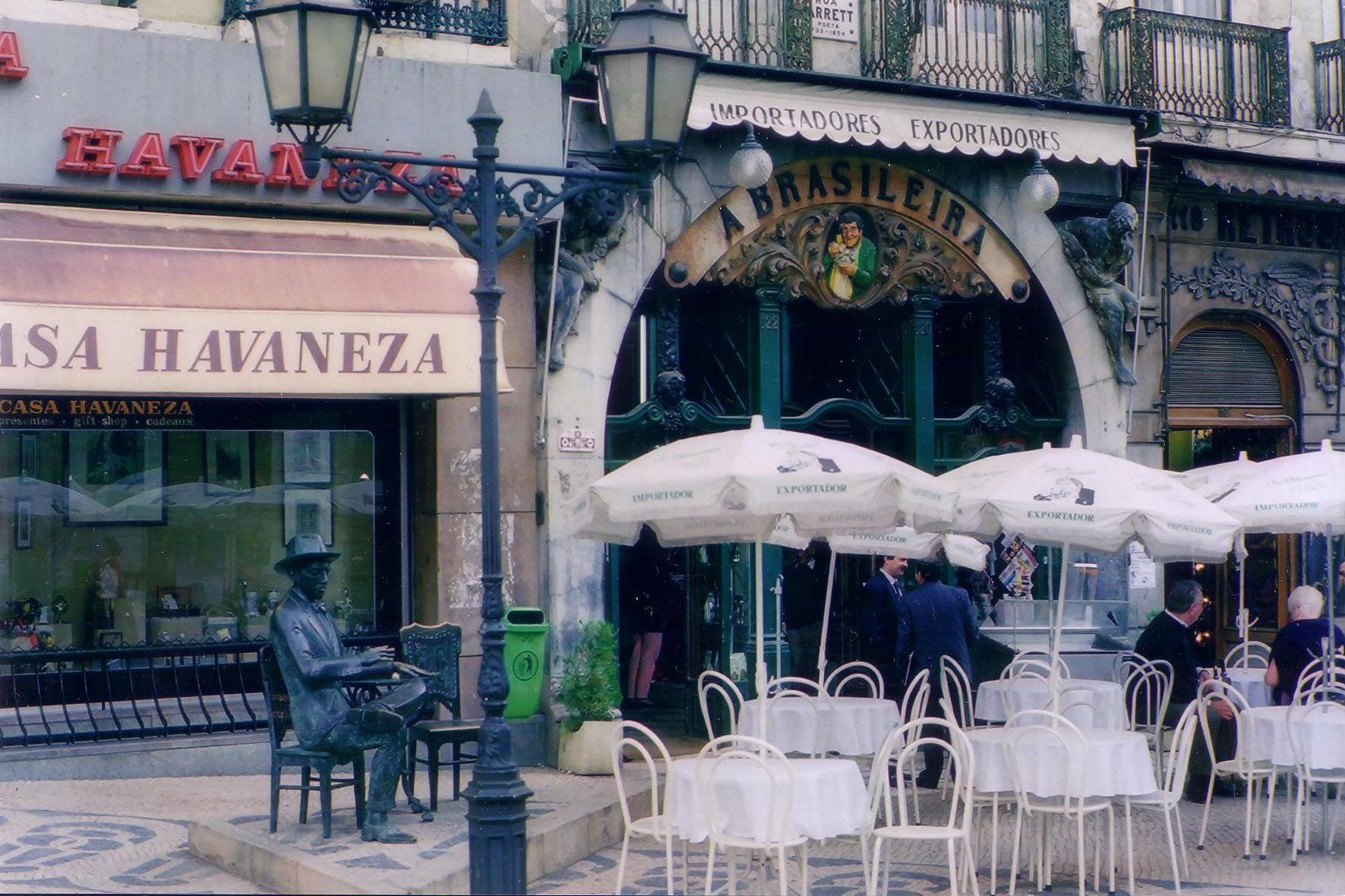
- The iconic façade of the Café A Brasileira with the figure of Fernando Pessoa at his usual table

- Location within Lisbon
- Former names: A Brazileira
- Etymology: Portuguese: "Café of the Brazilian Woman"

General information
- Type: Coffeehouse
- Architectural style: Art Nouveau
- Location: Chiado (Sacramento), 120 Rua Garrett, Lisbon, Portugal
- Coordinates: 38°42′38.49″N 9°8′31.37″W
- Opened: 19 November 1905

Technical details
- Material: Concrete

Design and construction
- Architect: Manuel Joaquim Norte Júnior

Website
- abrasileira.pt

The Café A Brasileira ([kɐˈfɛ ɐ βɾɐziˈlɐjɾɐ]; "Café The Brazilian"), previously spelled as A Brazileira, is a café located in Lisbon, specifically at 120 Rua Garrett, in the civil parish of Santa Maria Maior. Opened in 1905 by Adrian Telles as a shop for import and sale of Brazilian coffee, it is now one of the oldest and most famous cafés in the old quarter of Lisbon.

In the 1920s, the café became a popular meeting place for Lisbon’s intellectuals, artists, and writers. Among them was Fernando Pessoa, who often spent time there. A bronze statue of Pessoa sitting at a table is installed beside the terrace outside the café.

== History ==
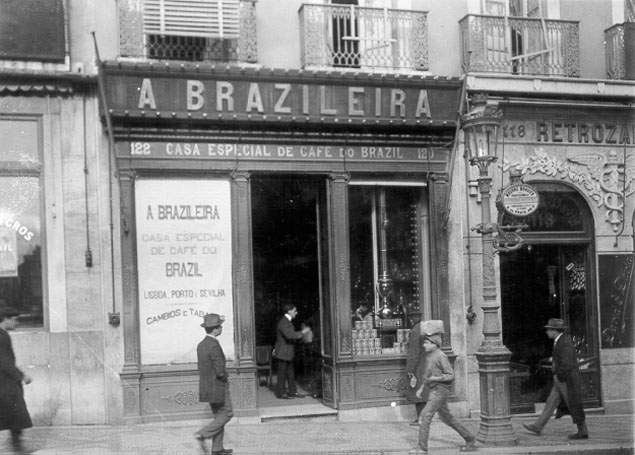
A Brasileira in 1911, photo by Joshua Benoliel.

During the middle of the 19th century, the Hotel Borges is founded along the Travessa de Estevão Galhardo, in the proximity of the Hotel Universal (in the old Barcelinhos Palace, later the Chiado warehouses). The space is successively operated within the upper floors of the building, while a shop (operated by Ramiro Leão) functioned on the main floor. In 1868, Elie Bénard inaugurated a small bakery along Rua Garret at no. 104-106, while the Grande Hotel Borges continues to operate under its proprietor António Borges Areias (by 1883).

The café, initially spelled A Brazileira, was opened by Adriano Telles on 19 November 1905 at No.122 (an old shirt shop), to sell "genuine Brazilian coffee" from the State of Minas Gerais, a product generally unappreciated in homes of Lisboetas of that period. This was the second establishment Telles opened in Portugal, after the first one in Porto, in 1903. In order to promote his product, Telles offered each shopper, who bought a kilogram of ground coffee (for 720 réis), a free cup of coffee. It was the first shop to sell the "bica", a small cup of strong coffee, similar to espresso. The founder, who lived in Brazil and imported his products, had no problem in importing coffee, goiabada, tapioca, spices, tea, flour, in addition to wine and olive oils.

In 1907 the owner of A Brasileira opened a similar establishment in Braga.

In 1908, the Brasileira was remodelled by Manuel Joaquim Norte Júnior (1878-1962) in order to provide a café, and again in 1922, to re-orient the business model in order to sell drinks, in addition to coffee. Its redesign, completed by architect José Pacheco, was completed in the Art Deco-style, with a green and gold entrance, and an interior that included mirrored walls, brass fittings, a long, oak bar and wooden booths.

With the establishment of the First Portuguese Republic (5 October 1910), its associated liberties, and the installation of the Directório in the Largo de São Carlos (then renamed Largo do Directório) the Brasileira became a heavily transited café.

It was during the nascent Republic that numerous intellectuals, artists and literary writers began to walk through its doors. United by the poet-General Henrique Rosa (the adoptive uncle of Fernando Pessoa), many of the literary figures would help to establish the magazine Orpheu.

Between 1950–1960 the Brasileira was in risk of closing permanently.

By 1993, the café had weathered its mid-century financial problems, and had applied for funds from the Lisboa 94 Capital Europeia da Cultura program to remodel and restore the building.

== Architecture ==
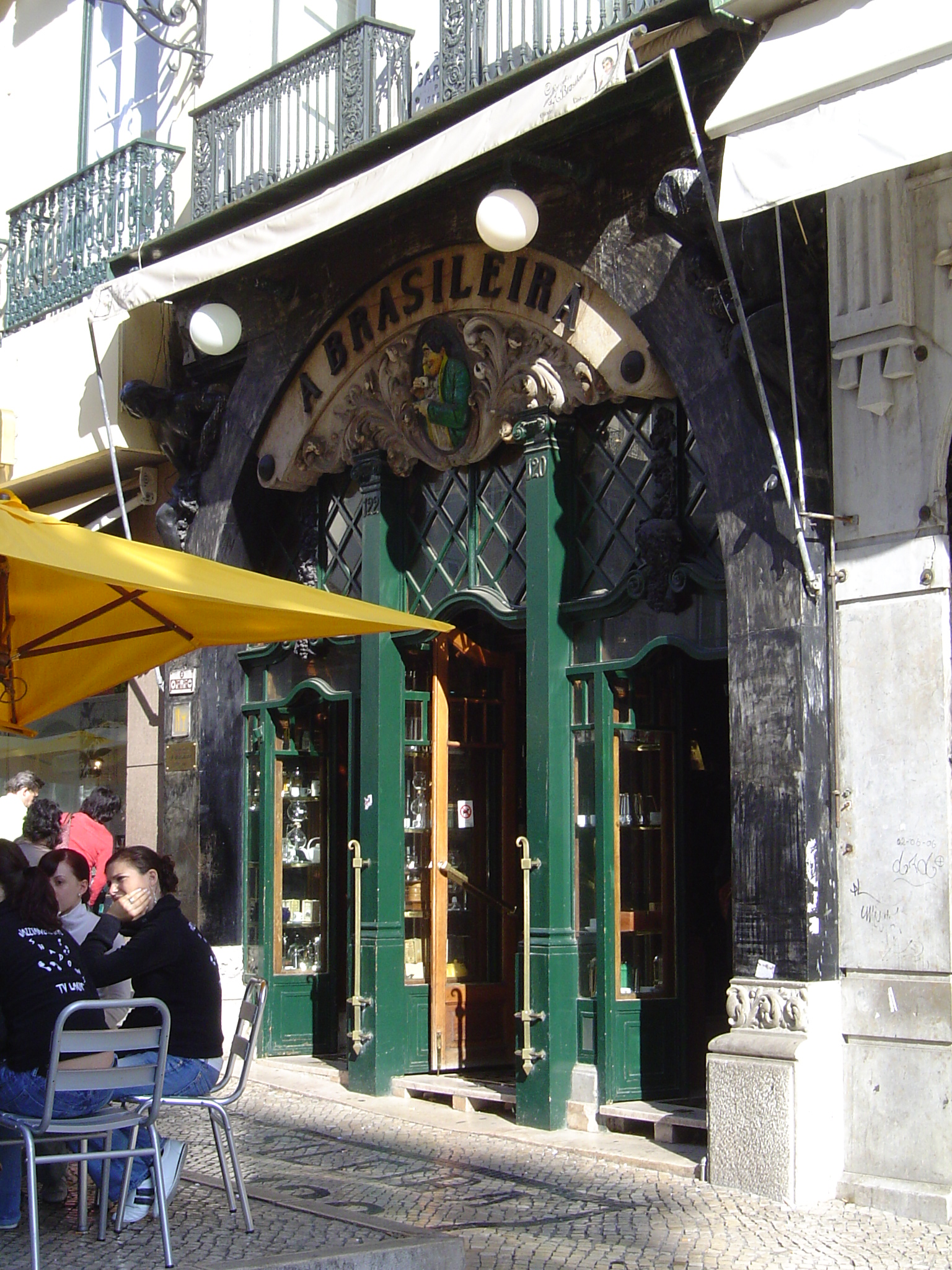
Exterior façade of A Brasileira, with ornamental door and boilerplate

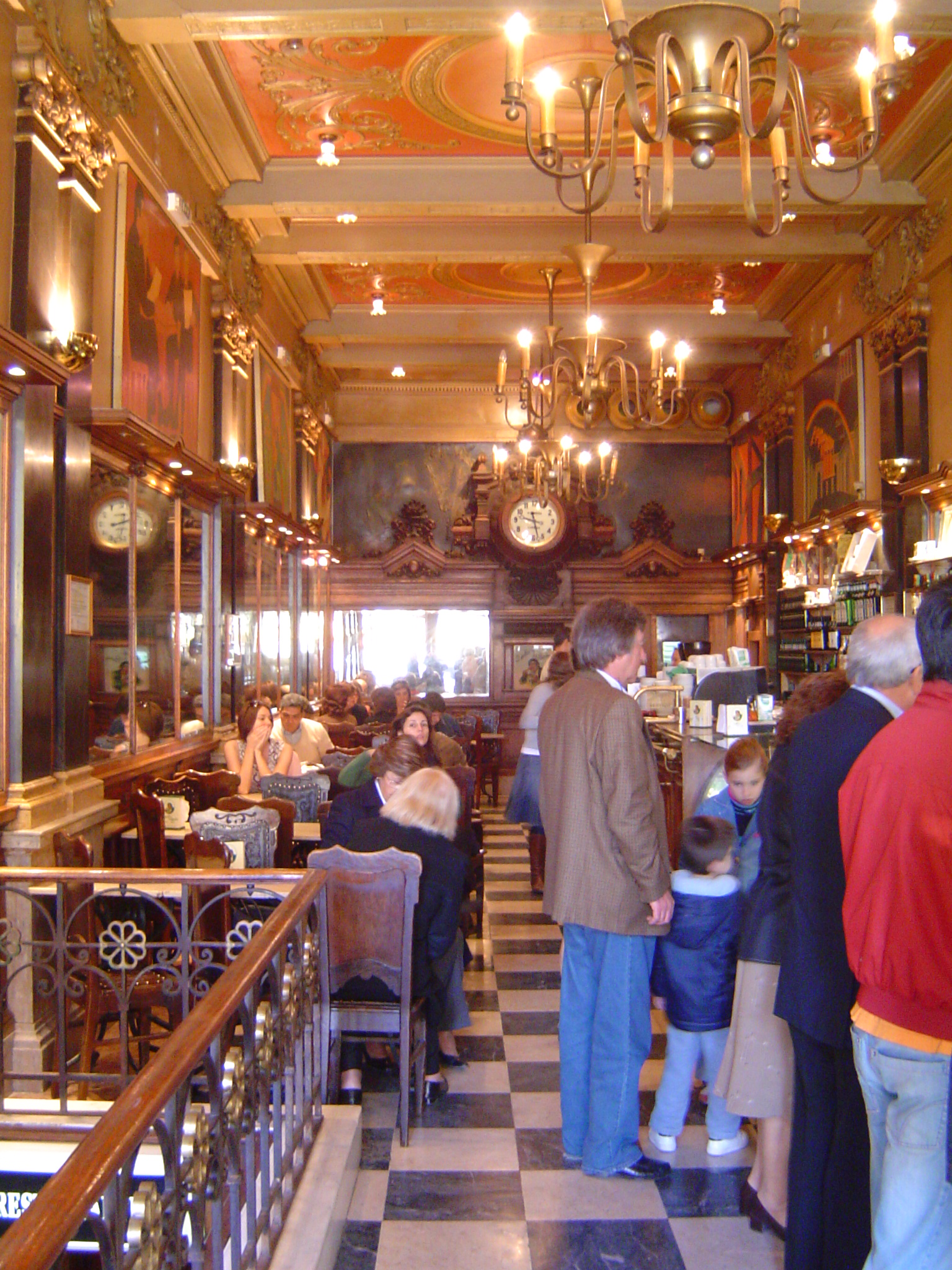
The always active counter of A Brasileira during mid-afternoon

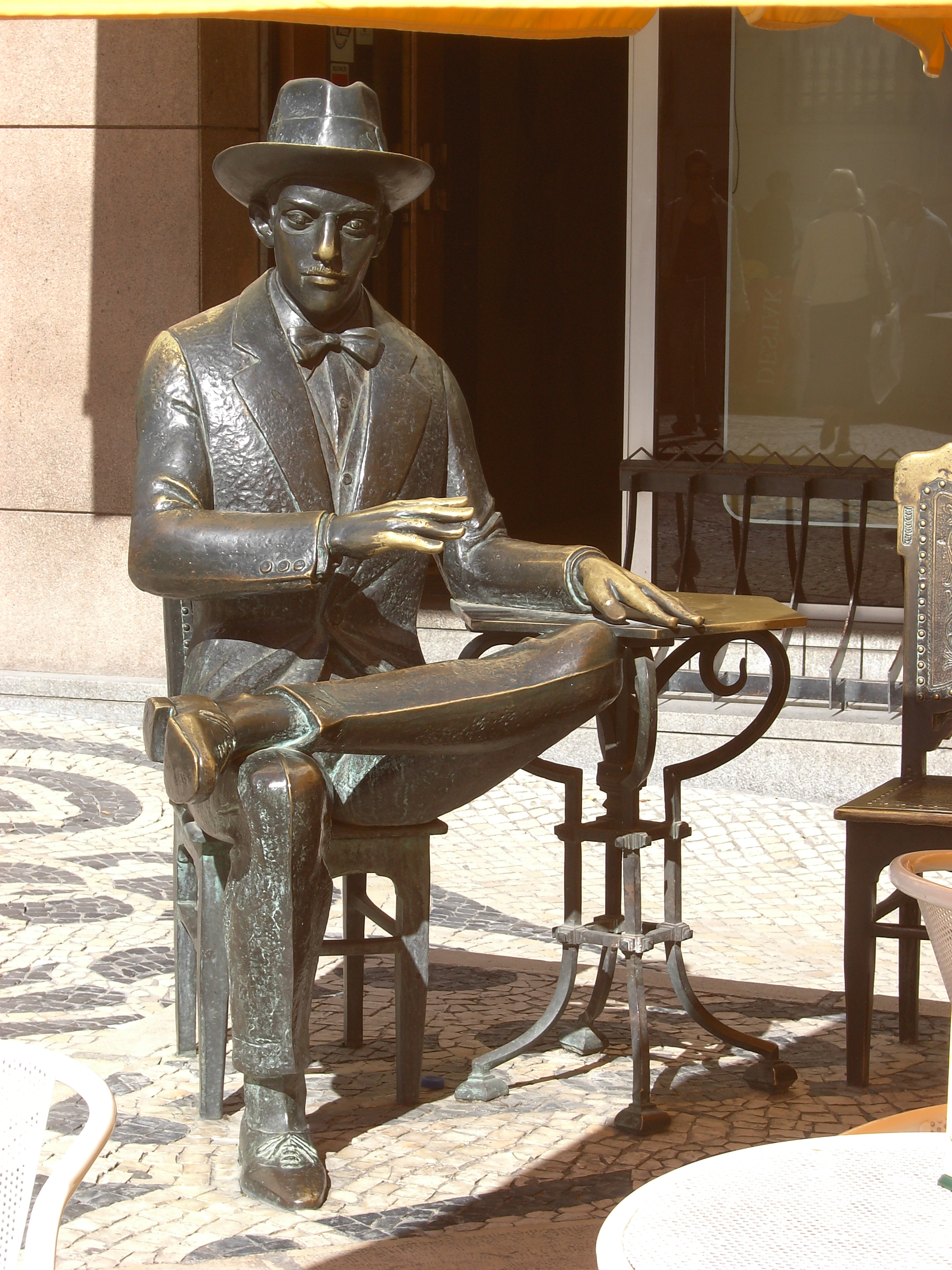
A bronze statue of Fernando Pessoa sits permanently outside

=== Exterior ===
The building is a narrow, two-floor rectangular plan (main floor and basement), with a front façade that includes the establishment name A Brasileira and respective address number. The narrow façade with a differentiated decoration, includes many polychromatic elements: an arched cement façade with inlaid windows; with two reclined figures on either end of the curves; a geometric, cornice-like entranceway with three separate double-doors (the central access being the largest), fronting onto Rua Garrett; and ornate handles and fixtures. Below the boilerplate, in relief, is the figure of a man taking a coffee, surrounded by curvilinear flourishments.

=== Interior ===
The long narrow hall includes mosaicked floors in alternating marble tiles (in black and white), a roof with ornamental friezes and square pillars along the walls, also decorated in sculpted wood. The room itself is painted in ochres, golds and reds, with brass fixtures intermingling with sculpted red woods. Between the pillars are mirrors, while at the far end of the café is a clock encased in a wooden decoration. The counter, is located on the right wall of the entranceway, while a staircase provides access to the kitchen located in the basement.

== Culture ==
It was a haunt of intellectuals and academics, including Portuguese poet Fernando Pessoa, the writers Aquilino Ribeiro and Alfredo Pimenta. Fernando Pessoa would regularly enjoy absinthe and bica, while he continuously smoked, read or wrote.

Over its storied history and because of the initiative of José Pacheco, the walls of the Brasileira collected prominent paintings from artists. In 1925, the Brasileira began to exhibit the paintings of the new generation of Portuguese painters, that frequented the café: José de Almada Negreiros, António Soares, Eduardo Viana, Jorge Barradas, Bernardo Marques, José Pacheko and Stuart Carvalhais. These works were eventually sold to one buyer in 1969. This "museum" was renovated in 1971, with new paintings from painters of the epoch: António Palolo, Carlos Calvet, Eduardo Nery, Fernando Azevedo, João Hogan, João Vieira, Joaquim Rodrigo, Manuel Baptista, Nikias Skapinakis, Noronha da Costa and Vespeira.

A bronze statue of Fernando Pessoa, by sculptor Lagoa Henriques, was eventually placed outside the café in 1988, even though Pessoa considered the Café Martinho da Arcada (on the Praça do Comércio, founded in 1782), as his favorite café.

The University of Lisbon's Faculdade de Belas-Artes (English: School of Fine Arts) is located within the Chiado district, and its approximately 1300 students transit the quarter regularly, competing with tourists for open-air tables.

== See also ==
- Jorge Melício, hyperrealistic artist, contributed in the looks of the café with his painting
- Café A Brasileira (Braga)
