= Brasil (surname) =

Brasil is a surname. It originated from a Portuguese word for the country of Brazil. Notable people with the surname include:

- André Brasil (born 1984), Brazilian Paralympic swimmer
- Cristiane Brasil (born 1973), Brazilian lawyer and politician
- Edgar Brasil (1902–1954), German-born Brazilian cinematographer
- Louis Lucien Brasil (1865–1918), French zoologist
- Luiz Brasil (born 1954), Brazilian guitarist
- Victor Assis Brasil (1945–1981), Brazilian jazz saxophonist
- Linda Brasil (born 1973), Brazilian activist and politician

== See also ==
- Brazil (surname)
