= Braga (São José de São Lázaro e São João do Souto) =

- Civil parish
- Location in Portugal
- Coordinates: 41.548°N 8.412°W
- Country: Portugal
- Region: Norte
- Intermunic. comm.: Cávado
- District: Braga
- Municipality: Braga

Area
  - Total: 2.43 km^{2} (0.94 sq mi)

Population (2011)
  - Total: 14,301
  - Density: 5,890/km^{2} (15,200/sq mi)
- Time zone: UTC+00:00 (WET)
  - Summer (DST): UTC+01:00 (WEST)

Braga (São José de São Lázaro e São João do Souto) is a civil parish in the municipality of Braga, Portugal. It was formed in 2013 by the merger of the former parishes São José de São Lázaro and São João do Souto. The population in 2011 was 14,301, in an area of 2.43 km^{2} (0.94 sq mi).

Located in the Largo Barão de São Martinho is the Café A Brasileira (The Brazilian Cafe), an establishment with a storied history in Braga, Porto and Lisbon.
