= Sister Philippa Brazill =

(1895–1988) Sister of Mercy, Australian nurse and hospital administrator

Dame Sister M. Philippa Brazill, DBE, LLD (24 December 1895, County Limerick, Ireland – 1 January 1988), generally known as Sister Philippa, was an Australian nursing educator and administrator.

== Background ==
Born as Johanna Brazill but known as "Josie" from an early age. She relocated to Australia as a child. She completed her secondary education at Sacred Heart College, Geelong, before commencing her religious training in 1915. She took the religious name of Sister Mary Philippa after entering the Sisters of Mercy on 10 January 1918, aged 21. After graduating from the Teachers' Training College at Ascot Vale, she taught at several schools in Victoria, Australia. In 1928 she entered the nursing staff of St Benedict's Hospital, Malvern, which had been acquired by the Sisters of Mercy.

== Work ==
She completed her training at Mater Misericordiae Hospital, Brisbane. She toured several American hospitals over a period of at least six months, gather ideas for incorporation into the plans of the St Benedict's Sisters for the establishment of a Hospital for Women. When the Mercy Private Hospital was opened in 1935, Sister Philippa was named its first matron, being responsible for setting the patient care standards and for introducing general nurse training. From 1954–1959 she served as Provincial of the Sisters of Mercy in Victoria and Tasmania, after which she returned to the Mercy Private Hospital.

== Honours/awards ==
In 1979, Sister Philippa was knighted as a Dame Commander of the Order of the British Empire for outstanding service in the field of health care. On 1 August 1981, the University of Melbourne awarded her the Honorary Degree of Doctor of Laws in recognition of her services to women and family life. She was the first nun to receive the award from the University.

== Death ==
Sister Philippa died on 1 January 1988, shortly after her 92nd birthday.
