= Braga Pedagogical Farm =

Farm in Braga, Portugal

Coordinates: 41°33′40.918″N 8°26′16.264″W

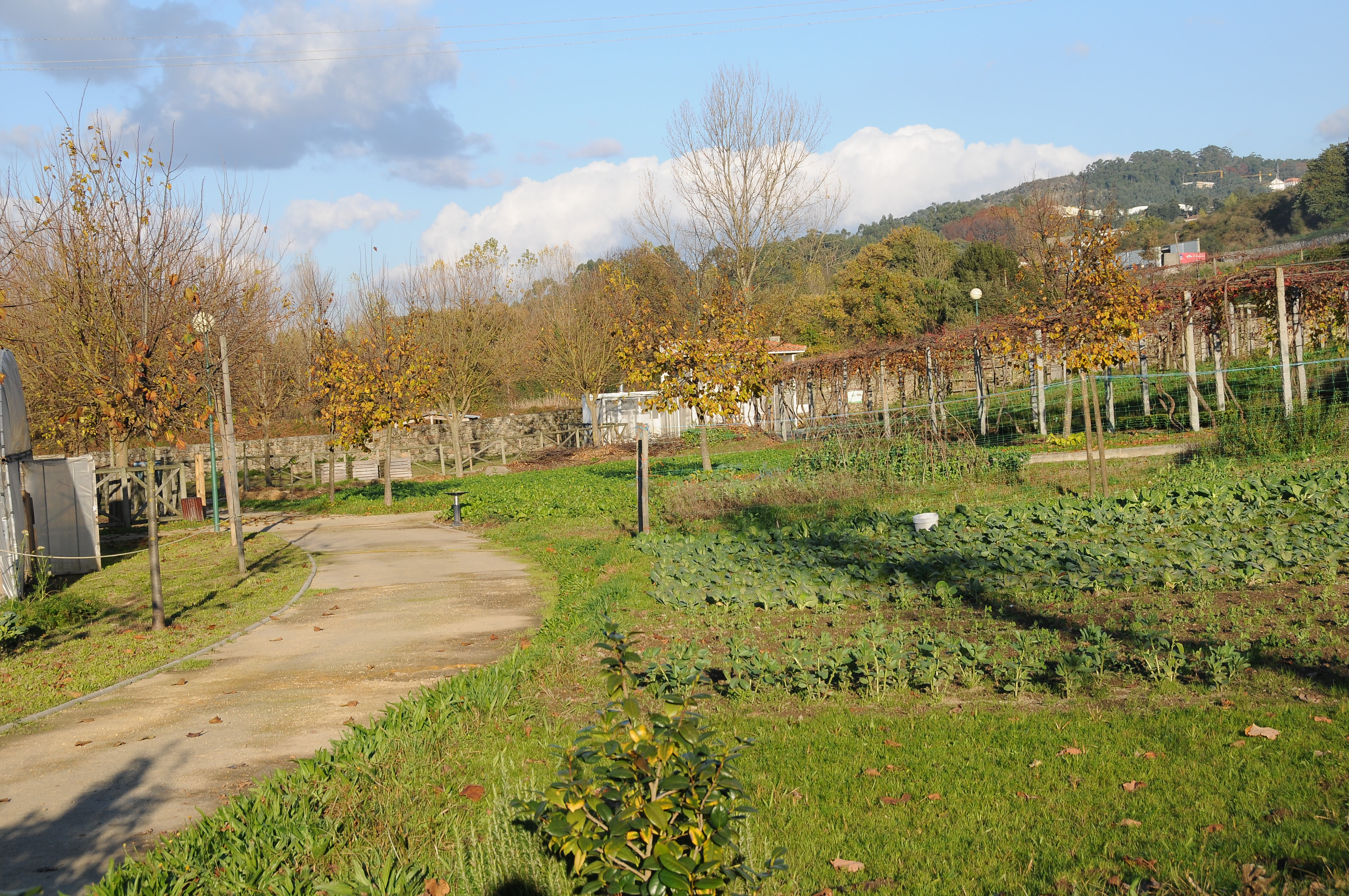

The Braga Pedagogical Farm is an educational and environmental farm located in Braga, Portugal.

It has been open since 2004 and educational activities on the environment have been implemented.

It occupies 2.5 hectares in accord with the region's small-scale cultures and traditional farms.

Activity rooms complete this allowing visitors to understand the farm life and from where are the products they consume on a daily life.
