= Ascarat =

Ascarat Azkarate
- Commune
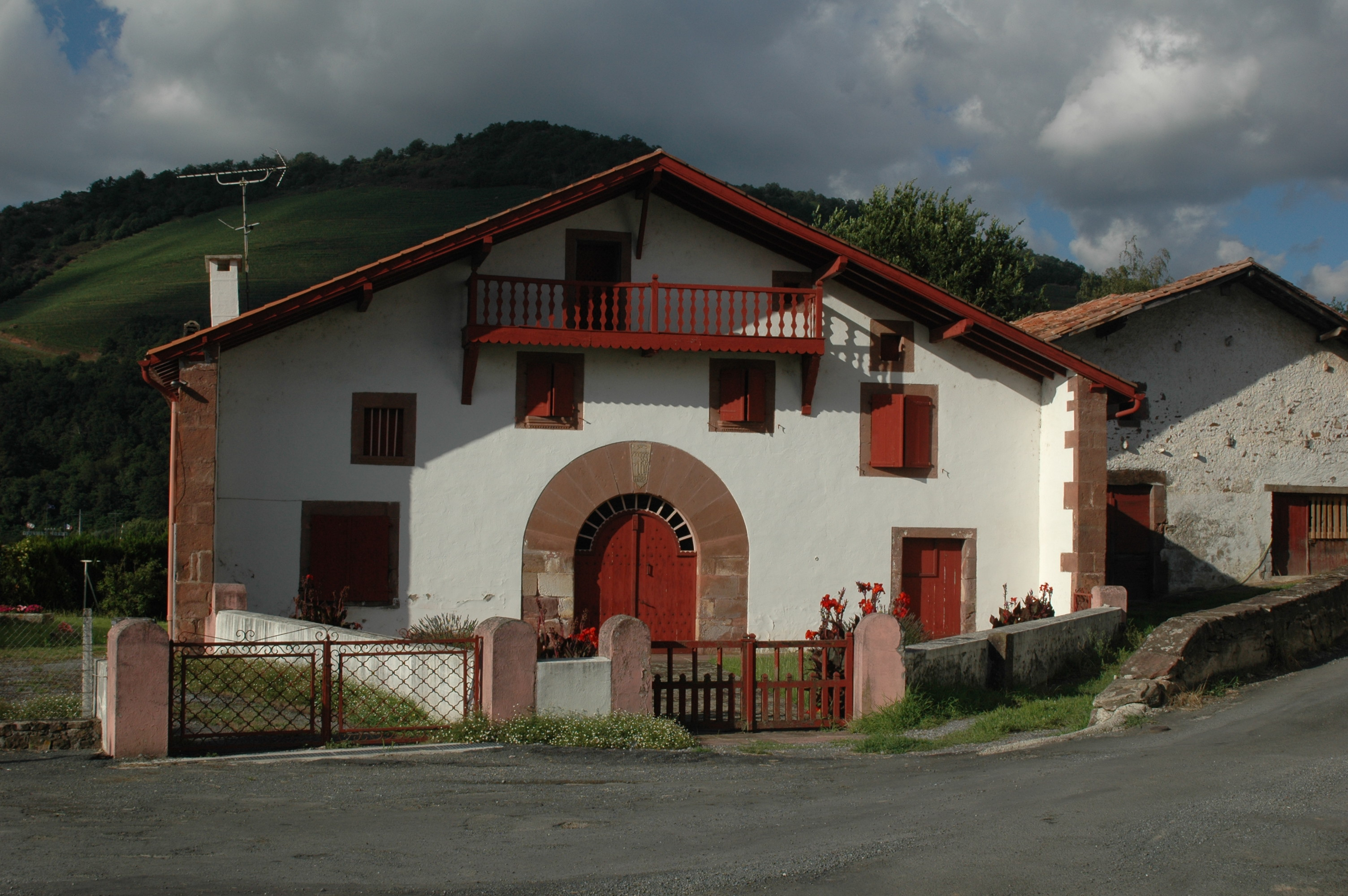
- Traditional Farmhouse in Ascarat

- Coat of arms
- Location of Ascarat
- Location within France Location within Nouvelle-Aquitaine
- Coordinates: 43°10′17″N 1°15′14″W
- Country: France
- Region: Nouvelle-Aquitaine
- Department: Pyrénées-Atlantiques
- Arrondissement: Bayonne
- Canton: Montagne Basque
- Intercommunality: CA Pays Basque

Government
  - Mayor (2020–2026): Philippe Etchenique
- Area^{1}: 5.82 km^{2} (2.25 sq mi)
- Elevation: 161 m (528 ft)
- Highest elevation: 446 m (1,463 ft)
- Lowest elevation: 120 m (390 ft)
- Population (2023): 348
  - Density: 59.8/km^{2} (155/sq mi)
- Time zone: UTC+01:00 (CET)
  - Summer (DST): UTC+02:00 (CEST)
- INSEE/Postal code: 64066 /64220
- ^{1} French Land Register data, which excludes lakes, ponds, glaciers > 1 km^{2} (0.386 sq mi or 247 acres) and river estuaries.

Ascarat (French pronunciation: [askaʁat]; Occitan: Escarpat; Basque: Azkarate) is a commune in the Pyrénées-Atlantiques department in the Nouvelle-Aquitaine region of south-western France.

The inhabitants are known as Azkaratear.

== Geography ==
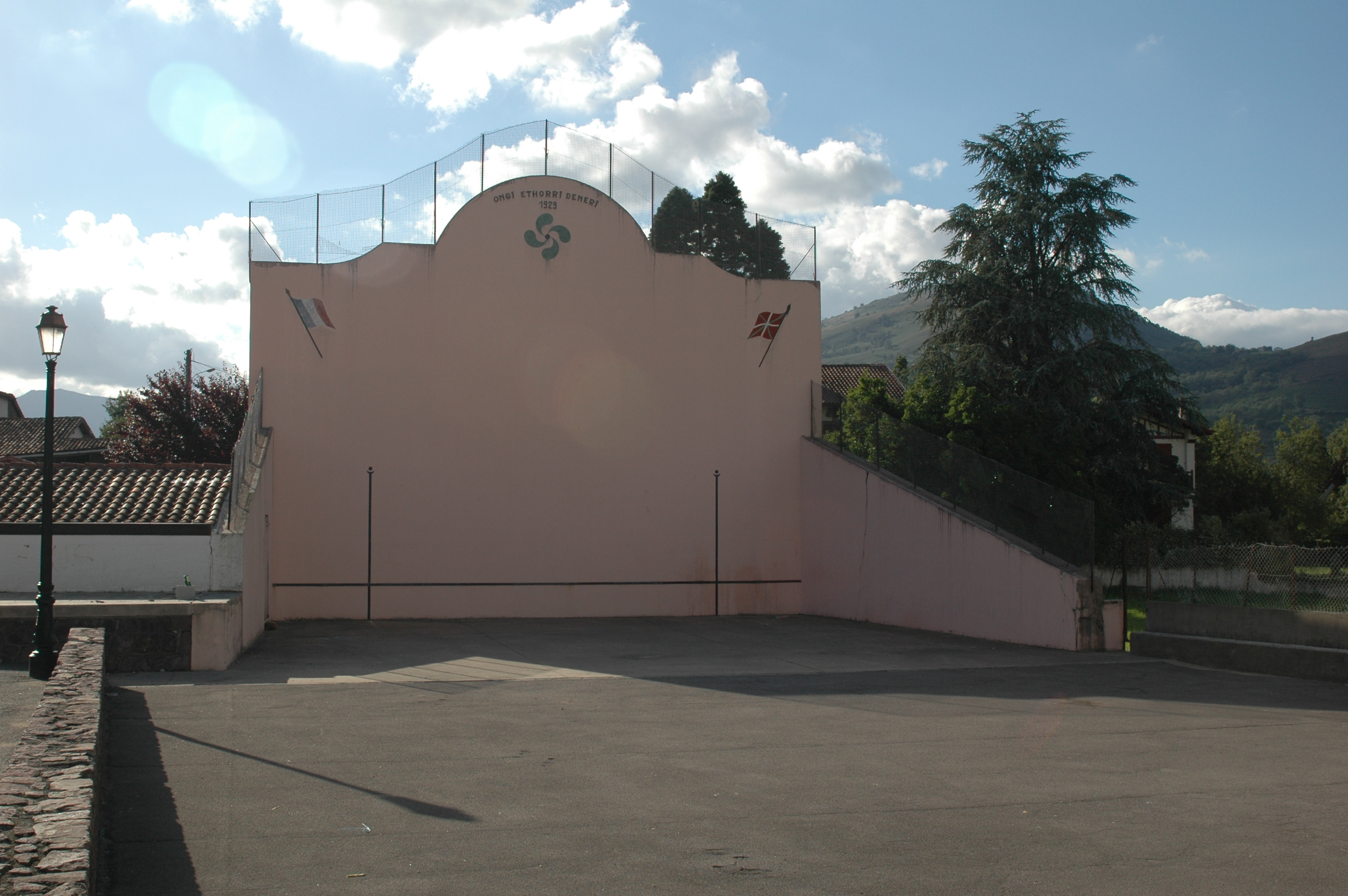
The fronton in the square

Ascarat is located in the former province of Lower Navarre in the Aldudes Valley immediately north-west of Saint-Jean-Pied-de-Port. Access to the commune is by the D918 road from Saint-Jean-Pied-de-Port which passes through the length of the commune on the eastern side and continues to Louhossoa. The D15 road goes north-west from Saint-Jean-Pied-de-Port through the southern part of the commune continuing to Irouléguy. Access to the village is by country roads - Garategana from the D15 and Learraa from the D918. There are substantial forests in the commune however about 70% of the land area is farmland.

The Nive river forms the eastern border of the commune as it flows north to join the Adour at Bayonne. Three streams flow into the Nive in the commune: the Nive d'Arnéguy, the Nive de Béhérobie, the Berroko erreka, and the Pagolako erreka.

=== Places and hamlets ===
- Apelchénéa
- Arbelarréa
- Arrécharborda
- Béhérekoetchéa
- Bentaberria
- Beskinaénéa
- Bidartéa
- Bordia
- Burugorriénéa
- Caracotchéa
- Choko Ona
- Errékaldéa
- Fargas (château)
- Ferrandoénéa
- Garatégaïna
- Haranbiako Borda
- Harguinaénéa
- Harguinchuria
- Hirureta
- Indartéa
- Iputchaénéa
- Ithurraldéa
- Ithurricheta
- Jauberria
- Pontoussénéa
- Puchulua
- La Solitude
- Tofinaenea
- Uhaldéa

== Toponymy ==
The name Ascarat appears in the forms:

- Ascarat (1106),
- Escarat (13th century),
- Azcarat (1350),
- Atzcarat (1366),
- Azquarat (1413),
- Axcarat (1513, Titles of Pamplona),
- Axcarate (1621, Martin Biscay), and
- Sanctus Julianus d'Ascarat (1763, Collations of the Diocese of Bayonne).

Jean-Baptiste Orpustan indicated that the name is composed of aitz ("rock") and garate ("high place"), giving "a height of rocks".

Chubitoa was a hamlet in Ascarat and Anhaux, mentioned in 1863

Jauréguy was a fief, vassal of the Kingdom of Navarre, cited in the 1863 dictionary as was Larragoyen.

The commune name in basque is Azkarate.

== History ==
The parish was mentioned in 1256 and was "ravaged by soldiers" in 1396.

In 1391 Saint-Étienne-de-Baïgorry included the modern communes of Anhaux, Ascarat, Irouléguy, and Lasse.

=== Heraldry ===
Arms of Ascarat	Blazon: Quarterly, at 1 Azure, a vine stalk leaved in Argent, fruited in Or; at 2 Argent an eagle rising of Sable on a mount of Vert; at 3 Argent with 2 fesses of Gules; at 4 Azure with a horse gai passant of Or surmounted by two mullets of Argent posed in fesse, a canton sinister of Gules charged with a sword of Argent.

== Administration ==
List of Successive Mayors

From	To	Name	Party	Position
1995	2020	Jean-Michel Galant	AB	General Councillor
2020	2026	Philippe Etchenique		

=== Inter-communality ===
The commune is part of nine inter-communal structures:

- the Communauté d'agglomération du Pays Basque;
- the SIVOS of Garazi;
- the SIVU Hiruen Artean;
- the AEP association of Anhice;
- the Energy association of Pyrénées-Atlantiques;
- the inter-communal association for sanitation of Ur Garbi;
- the inter-communal association for the management and development of the abattoir at Saint-Jean-Pied-de-Port;
- the joint association for the Drainage basin of the Nive;
- the association to support Basque culture.

== Demography ==
Historical population

Year	Pop.	±% p.a.
1793	334	—
1821	369	+0.36%
1846	445	+0.75%
1872	360	−0.81%
1901	338	−0.22%
1926	323	−0.18%
1946	348	+0.37%
1962	274	−1.48%
1968	283	+0.54%

Year	Pop.	±% p.a.
1975	282	−0.05%
1982	294	+0.60%
1990	294	+0.00%
1999	275	−0.74%
2007	284	+0.40%
2012	313	+1.96%
2017	321	+0.51%
2023	348	+1.36%

Source: EHESS and INSEE

== Economy ==
The commune is part of the production zone of the Appellation d'origine contrôlée (AOC) of Irouléguy and also of the AOC zone of Ossau-iraty.

Economic activity is mainly agricultural.

== Culture and heritage ==
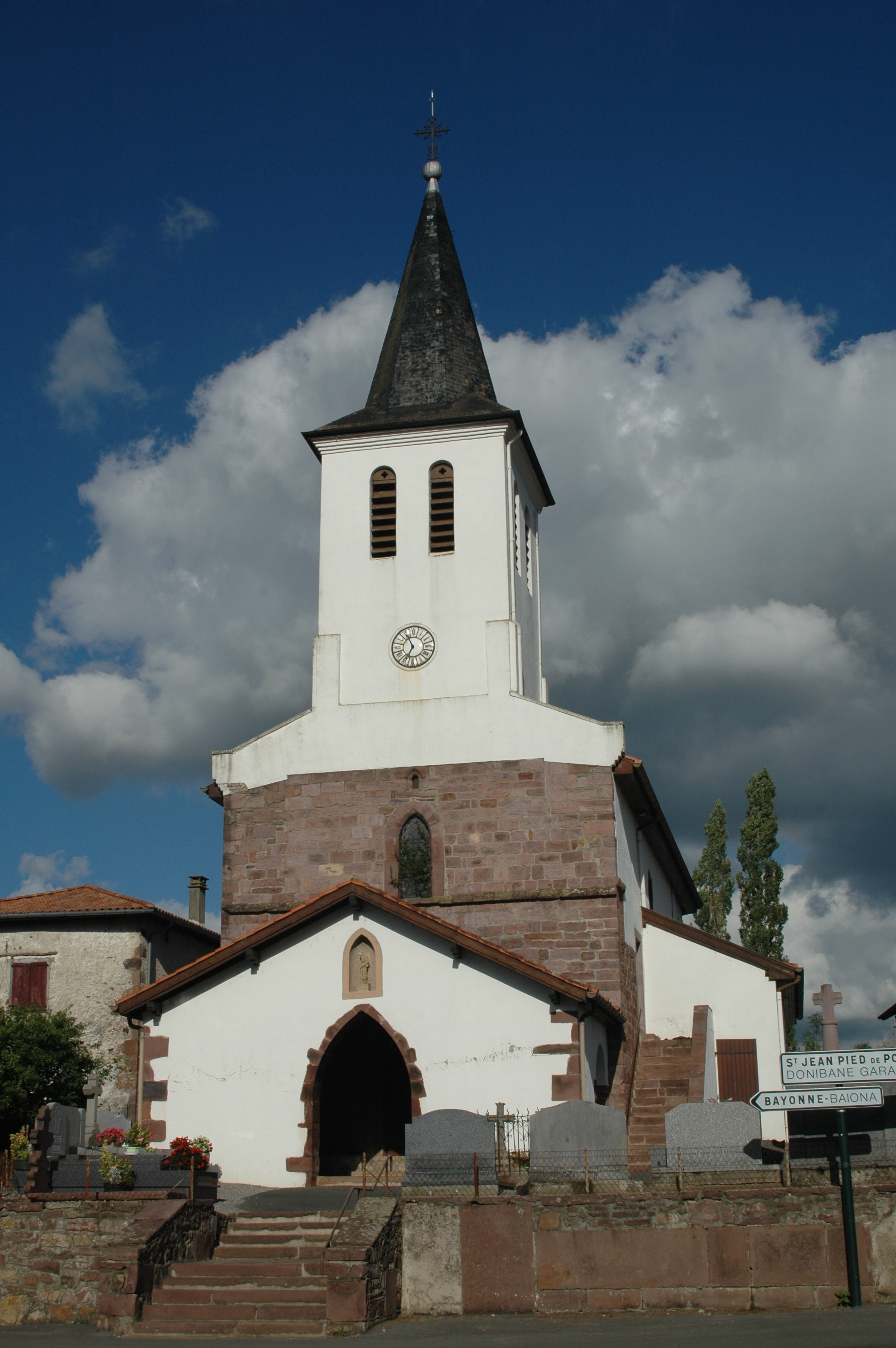
The Church

=== Civil heritage ===
There are several houses and farms in the commune which are registered as historical monuments. These are:

- Uhaldea House (18th century)
- Harizpea Farm (1587)
- Chateau de Vergues (or Chateau de Fargas) (18th century)
- Houses and Farms (17th-19th centuries)

=== Religious heritage ===
The Church of Saint-Julien-d'Antioche is of medieval origin was heavily rebuilt in the 18th and 19th century.

== Notable people linked to the commune ==
- Pierre Narbaitz, born in 1910 at Ascarat and died in 1984 at Cambo-les-Bains, was a historian, writer, and a basque French academic of the Basque and French languages.

== See also ==
- Communes of the Pyrénées-Atlantiques department
