= Anhaux =

Anhaux Anhauze
- Commune
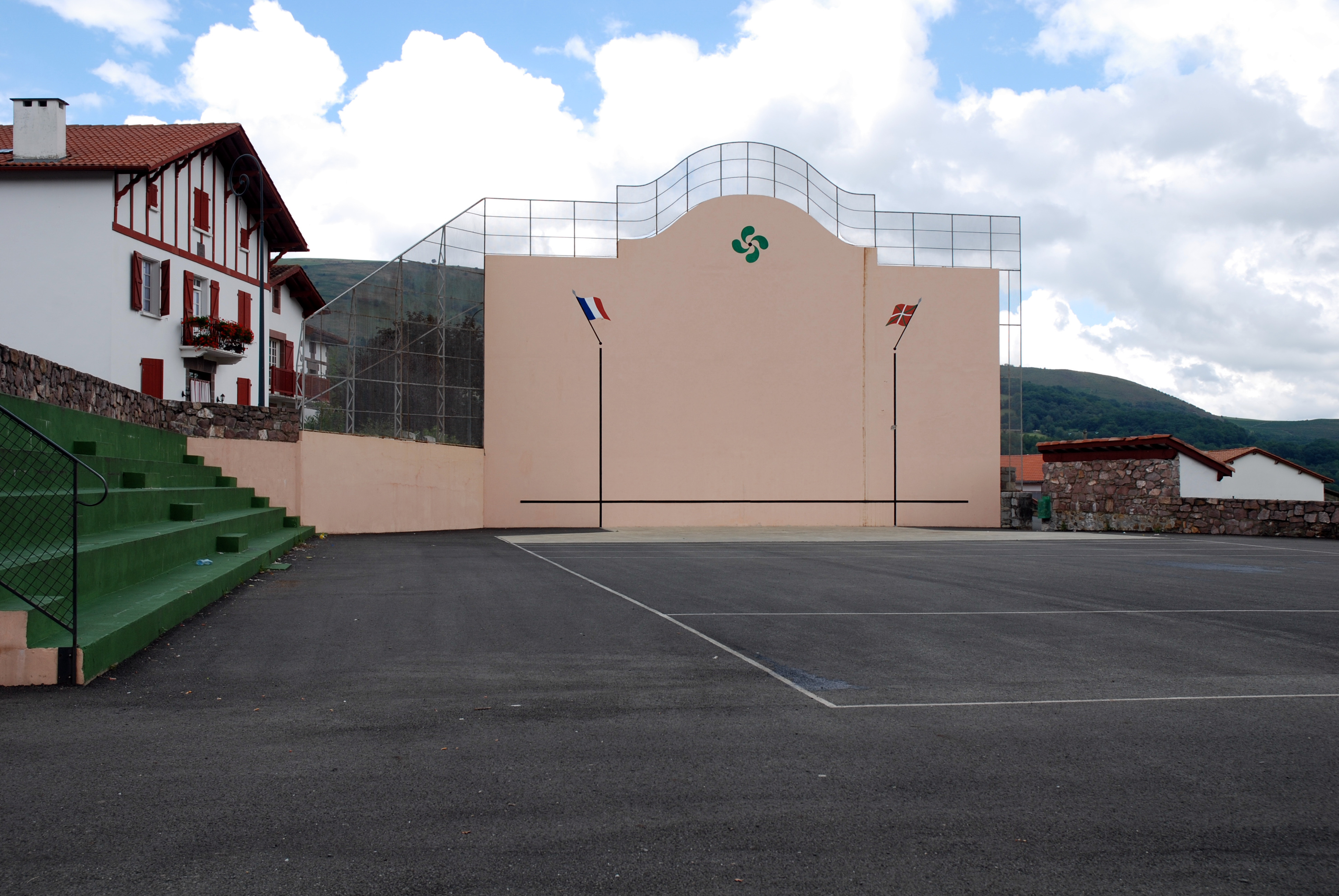
- The fronton at Anhaux

- Coat of arms
- Location of Anhaux
- Location within France Location within Nouvelle-Aquitaine
- Coordinates: 43°10′N 1°17′W
- Country: France
- Region: Nouvelle-Aquitaine
- Department: Pyrénées-Atlantiques
- Arrondissement: Bayonne
- Canton: Montagne Basque
- Intercommunality: Pays Basque

Government
  - Mayor (2020–2026): André Changala
- Area^{1}: 12.33 km^{2} (4.76 sq mi)
- Elevation: 189 m (620 ft)
- Highest elevation: 1,247 m (4,091 ft)
- Lowest elevation: 180 m (590 ft)
- Population (2023): 389
  - Density: 31.5/km^{2} (81.7/sq mi)
- Time zone: UTC+01:00 (CET)
  - Summer (DST): UTC+02:00 (CEST)
- INSEE/Postal code: 64026 /64220
- ^{1} French Land Register data, which excludes lakes, ponds, glaciers > 1 km^{2} (0.386 sq mi or 247 acres) and river estuaries.

Anhaux (French pronunciation: [anoks]; Basque: Anhauze) is a commune in the Pyrénées-Atlantiques department in the Nouvelle-Aquitaine region of south-western France. It is part of the former province of Lower Navarre.

The inhabitants of the commune are known as Anhauztar.

== Geography ==
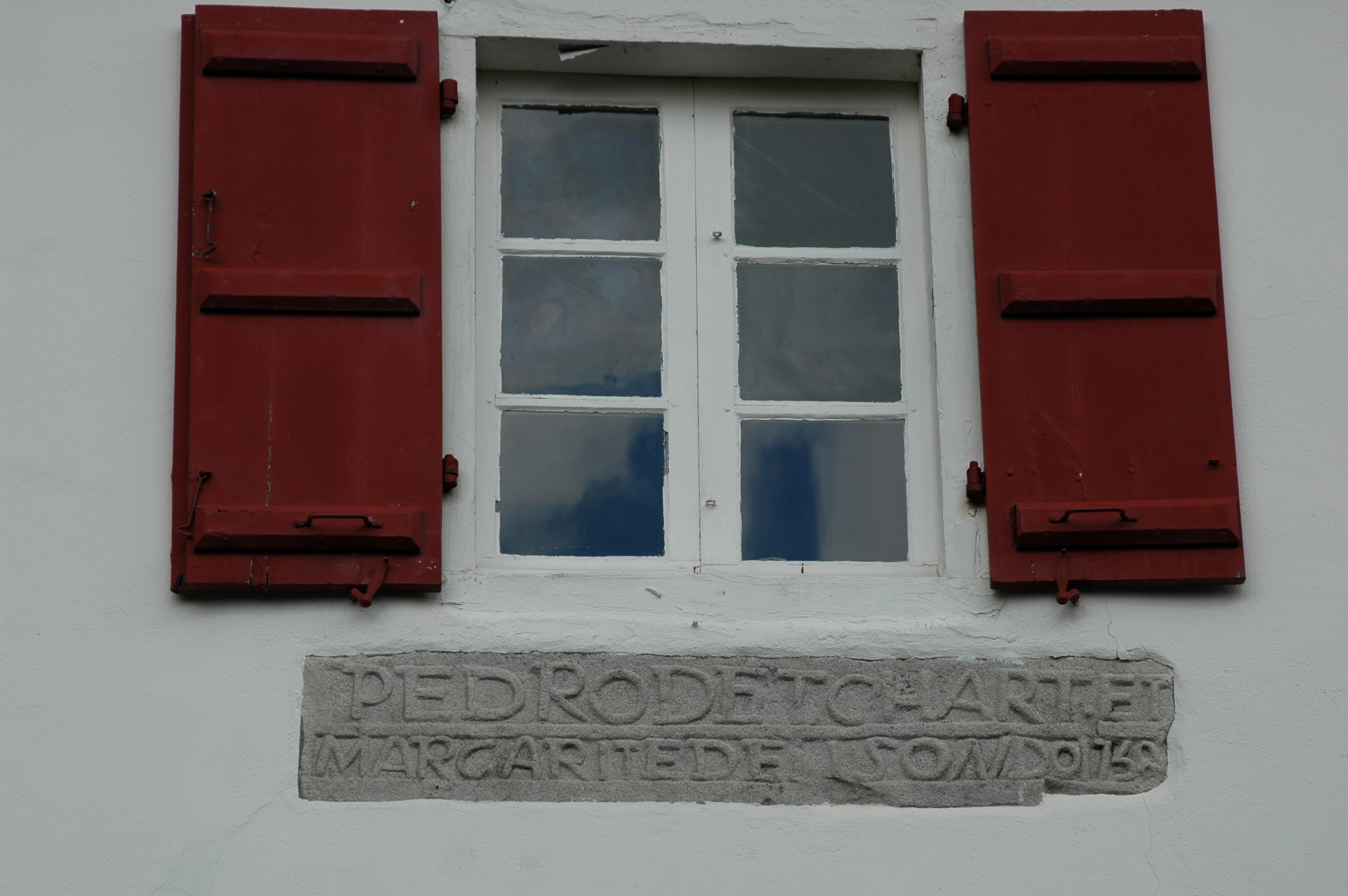
A business name on a lintel

Anhaux is located some 2 km west of Saint-Jean-Pied-de-Port and some 10 km south of Ossès. Access to the commune is solely by country roads branching from the D15 road passing to the north of the commune. The commune consists of farmland in the north with the southern part more rugged and hilly.

The commune is drained by several left tributaries of the Nive (Adour drainage basin). The Ontzeroneker erreka' - a tributary of the Nive d'Arnéguy - with many tributaries rising in the commune forms the southern border with Lasse commune. A right tributary of the Berroko erreka, the Aparraineko erreka flows down from the Artzaïnharria (971 m).

=== Localities and hamlets ===
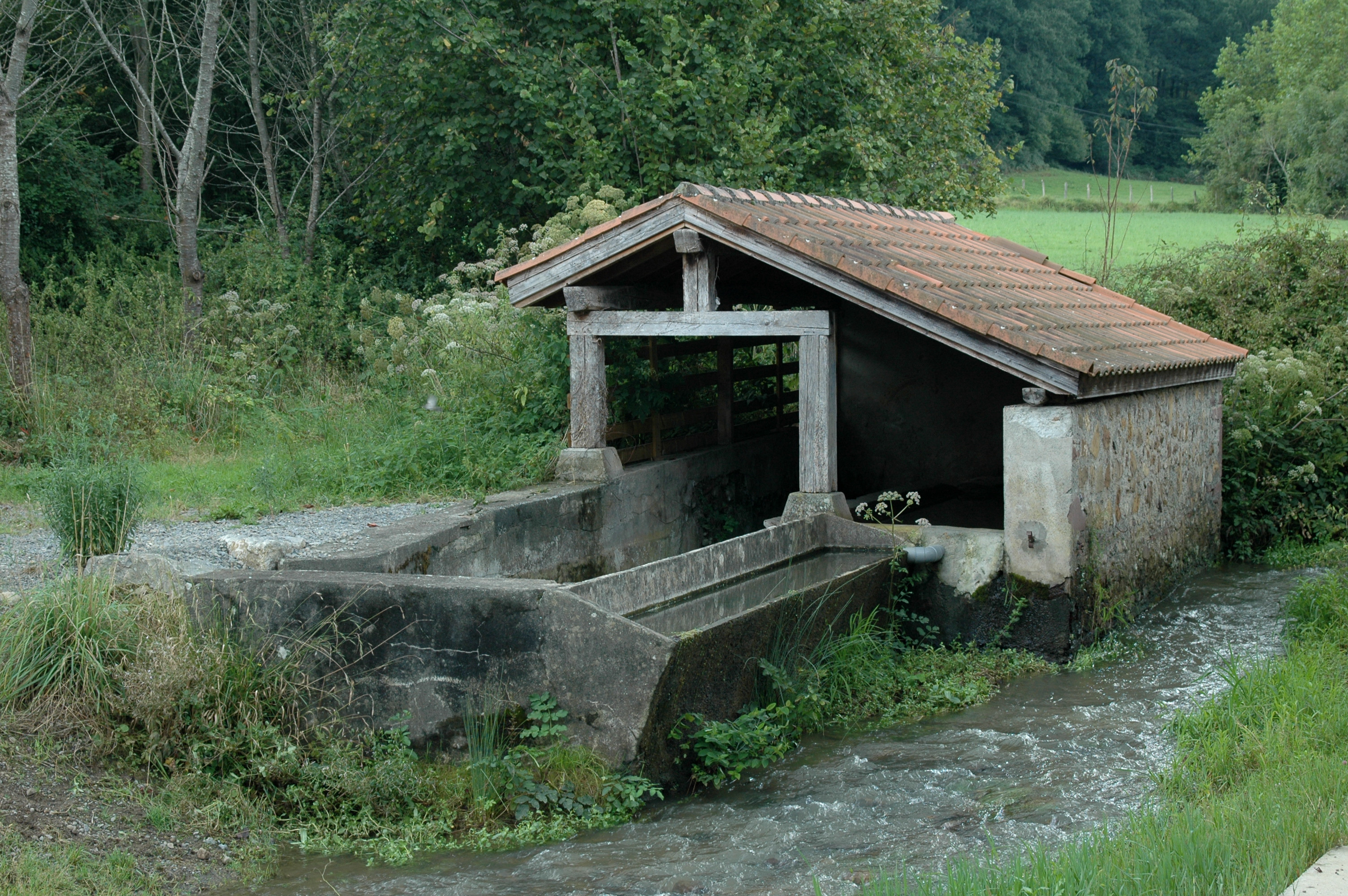
The Lavoir (Public Laundry)

The Napoleonic land registry divided the commune into 16 districts in 1840:

Districts in Section A called The Village

- village
- church
- Berterretcheco bordaldia
- Chubitoa
- Espillacoborda
- Lececo borda
- Mendione
- Ourdoy

Districts in Section B called Honçaron

- Elhorichury
- Haspalaunecoborda
- Laco
- Listour Erreca
- Mounocabal
- Mounhoa
- Olheguy
- Tambourinanea

Heguy was an old district, extending that of Choubitoa.

Today, the following localities are listed:

- Alcateneko Borda
- Amigna
- Aparrainéko Ithurria
- Apezteguikoborda
- Azaldeyko Borda
- Béharria
- Berteretchéko Borda
- Bidartea
- Bidarteko Borda
- Biraburuko Borda
- Bordachuria
- Chochuaénéa
- Chochuainea
- Chokoa
- Chuberaénéa
- Chubitoa
- Curutchaldéa
- Erratchuénéa
- Erdoyko Borda
- Erguinéko Borda
- Etcherriko Borda
- Etchéverriko Borda
- Eyhérartéko Borda
- Eyherartia
- Haspelanéko Borda
- Hiriartéa
- Idioïnéko Borda
- Lacoa
- Laxagua
- Lazkoborda
- Maldacharréko Borda
- Minhondoko Borda
- Nignigna
- Peilloénéa
- Col Urdanzia
- Urchiloko Borda
- Urdiako Lepoa

== Toponymy ==
The commune name in basque is Anhauze.

Brigitte Jobbé-Duval proposed a basque origin of ona-oz, meaning "place of the hill".

The following table details the origins of the commune name and other names in the commune.

Name	Spelling	Date	Source	Page	Origin	Description
Anhaux	Onodz	1068	Grosclaude		Mérimée	Village
	Nodz	1105	Grosclaude		Mérimée	
	Naoz	1264	Grosclaude		Mérimée	
	Hanauz	1350	Grosclaude		Mérimée	
	Anhautz	1366	Grosclaude		Mérimée	
	Anus	1378	Grosclaude			
	Anauz	1513	Raymond	6	Pamplona	
	Hanauz	1621	Raymond	6	Biscay	
	Anhausse	1686	Raymond	6	Collations	
Chubitoa	Chubitoa	1863	Raymond	50		Hamlet
Jauréguy	Jauréguy	1863	Raymond	85		Fief, Vassal of the Kingdom of Navarre

Sources:

- Grosclaude: Toponymic Dictionary of communes, Béarn, 2006 (in French)
- Raymond: Topographic Dictionary of the Department of Basses-Pyrenees, 1863, on the page numbers indicated in the table. (in French)

Origins:

- Mérimée: Presentation of the Commune
- Pamplona: Titles of Pamplona
- Biscay: Martin Biscay
- Collations: Collations of the Diocese of Bayonne

== History ==
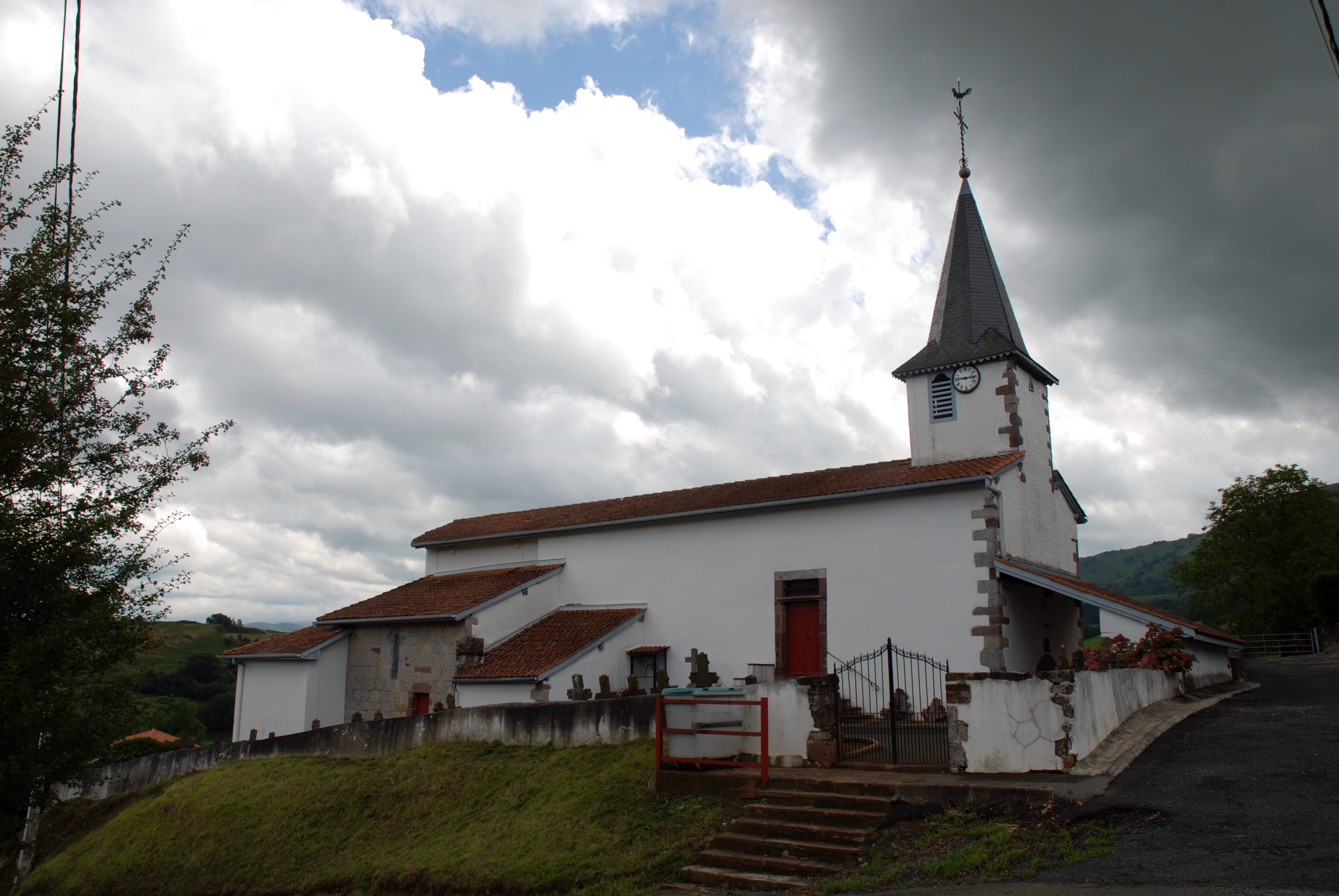
Church of Saint-Jean-Baptiste

Anhaux village is one of eleven hamlets or villages which were in the Baigorry Valley. In the Middle Ages, the eleven hamlets were: Ascarat, Sorhoeta, Moussourits, Lasse, Irouleguy, Urdos, Leispars, Occos, Oticoren, Guermiette, and Anhauz, all in the north of the valley. The south was not populated until much later. Despite sounding Basque, the name of this village seems to defy all analysis. The oldest document known on which the name Anhaux appears is now the cartulary of the abbey of Saint-Jean of Sorde where it appears in the 10th century.

Father Haristoy in his book Research on the Basque Country noted that recorded in this cartulary were:

- "1068-1072 Oz Guilhem de Onotz and his wife received from Saint-Jean a piece of land located at Anhaux subject to they and their successors providing security and seven loaves, one pig, one pint of wine, and two measures of provisions";
- "1072-1100 Fort Garcies de Onoz with his wife Farguild, and son undertook to give in perpetuity to Saint-Jean (of Sordes) six loaves, two measures of cider, and two civades".

The Benedictine Abbey in question was founded in the 9th century north-east of Navarre. It was, as with all the monasteries at the time, a vast agricultural area spread along the mountain streams in Orthe country and lower Navarre and, according to the two cited references, in the parish of Anhaux.

It was around 1023 that King Sancho III of Navarre founded the fief of the Viscounty of Baigory in favour of Garcias Lop who was related. The creation of the hamlet itself, on the viscounts' lands, therefore dates back to this period. Thus from the 11th century the status of houses at Anhaux was defined by the writer Jean-Baptiste Orpustan. He provided a list of houses existing in the Middle Ages in Anhaux. This document was created from the archives from 1350, 1366, and 1412.

Of the twenty-eight houses found there, four were noble (only the house was noble and so the owners were considered as such), the others were fivatiéres which means that they paid a fee in crops, work, or money and were built on the land of the "Lord" of the main house.

The successive Viscounts of Baigorry then of Echaux enjoyed the tithes of the village until their liquidation in 1792.

The arms Anhaux are those of the Apesteguy family. They were adopted by the municipal council on 30 July 1993. Pierre Haristoy wrote that the Apesteguy were lords of Jaureguia and of Anhaux and nominated the priest for the area. In deeds before 1670 several of the Apesteguy appear as noble. Towards 1720 Jean-Pierre d'Apesteguy was received by the States of Navarre. The house of Apesteguia was, until the 18th century, the Lay Abbey for the area. Its members played an important role in the valley until the end of the 19th century.

The Cassini map, made in the 18th century shows a parish consisting of:

- the village of Anhaux with a parish church;
- the hamlet of Choubitoua: currently a district of the same name;
- the hamlet of Bassabouria: currently the Olheguy district;
- the hamlet of Ounsaharte: currently the Lacoa district;
- the hamlet of Ançonne: currently the Tambourine district and part of the Mounhoa district on the slopes of Arrola peak.

=== Heraldry ===
Arms of Anhaux	Blazon: Azure, a pale of Argent flanked by two escallops the same.

== Administration ==
List of Successive Mayors

From	To	Name	Party
1792		Guillaume d'Uhalde	
1800	1832	Arnaud d'Apesteguy	
1832	1840	Guillaume Arreguy	
1840	1848	Jean Jaureguiberry	
1848	1872	Jean d'Apesteguy	
1874	1881	Jean d'Apesteguy	
1881	1883	Antoine Arreguy	
1883	1904	Pierre Narnaitz	
1904	1922	Michel Jaureguy	
1922	1934	Gratian Iribarne	
1934	1945	Jean Laxague	
1945	1947	Arnaud Irouleguy	
1947	1959	Bernard Piarresteguy	
1959	1977	Jean-Pierre Iribarne	
1977	1996	Bernard Etcheperestou	
1996	2014	Jacques Etchandy	UDF then MoDem
2014	2026	André Changala	

=== Inter-communality ===
Anhaux commune participates in eight inter-communal structures:

- the Communauté d'agglomération du Pays Basque;
- the SIVOS of Garazi;
- the SIVU Hiruen Artean;
- the Inter-communal association for the development and management of the abattoir of Saint-Jean-Pied-de-Port;
- the joint association for the watershed of the Nive;
- the association to support Basque culture;
- the AEP association of Irouleguy-Anhaux;
- the energy association of Pyrénées-Atlantiques.

== Demography ==
Historical population

Year	Pop.	±% p.a.
1793	604	—
1821	533	−0.45%
1846	705	+1.12%
1872	572	−0.80%
1901	419	−1.07%
1926	365	−0.55%
1946	318	−0.69%
1962	272	−0.97%
1968	285	+0.78%

Year	Pop.	±% p.a.
1975	275	−0.51%
1982	274	−0.05%
1990	310	+1.56%
1999	247	−2.49%
2007	285	+1.80%
2012	344	+3.83%
2017	387	+2.38%
2023	389	+0.09%

Source: EHESS and INSEE

== Economy ==
The commune is part of the Appellation d'origine contrôlée (AOC) of Irouléguy and also the AOC of Ossau-iraty. Economic activity is principally agricultural.

== Culture and heritage ==
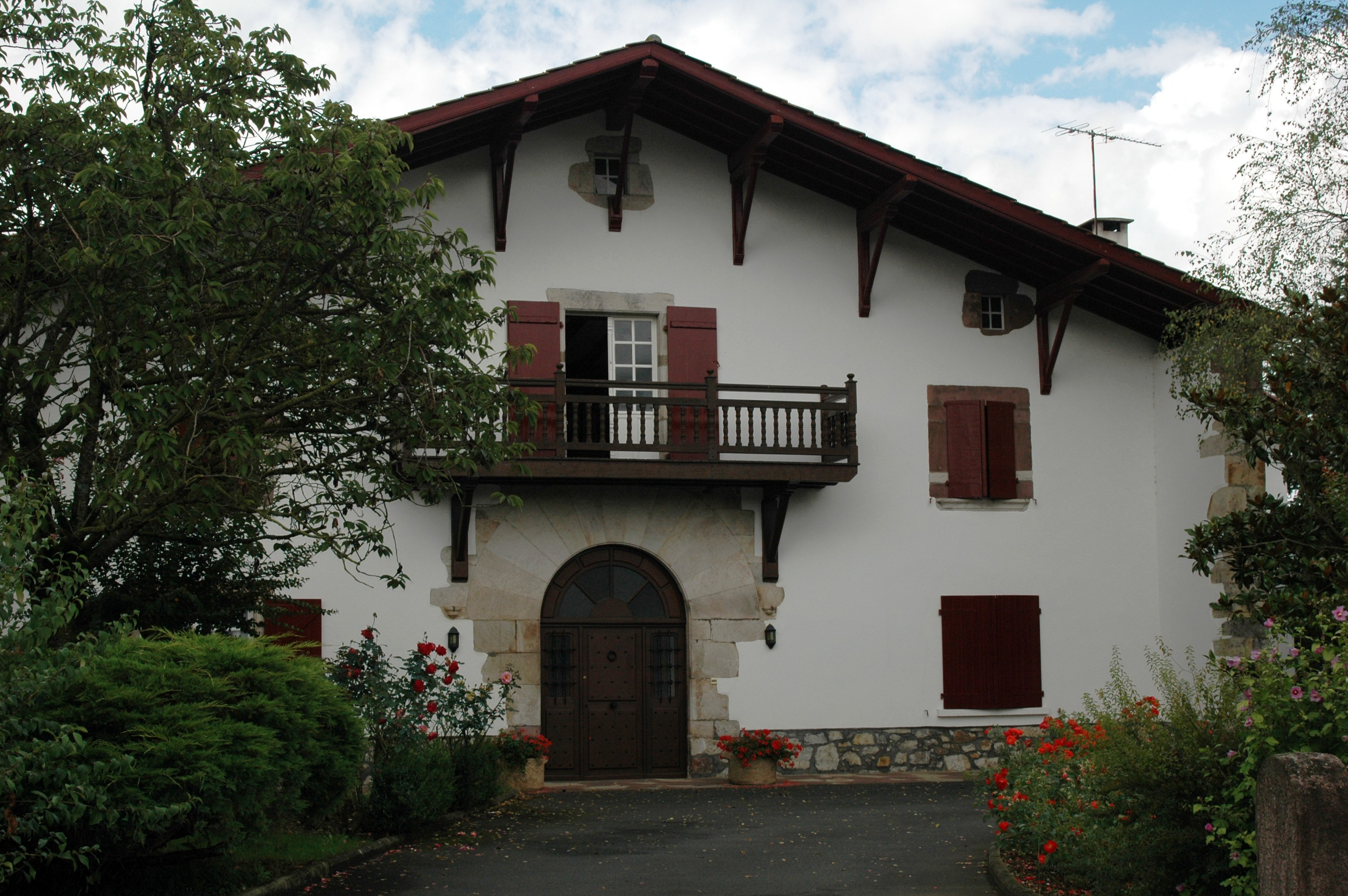
A House in Anhaux

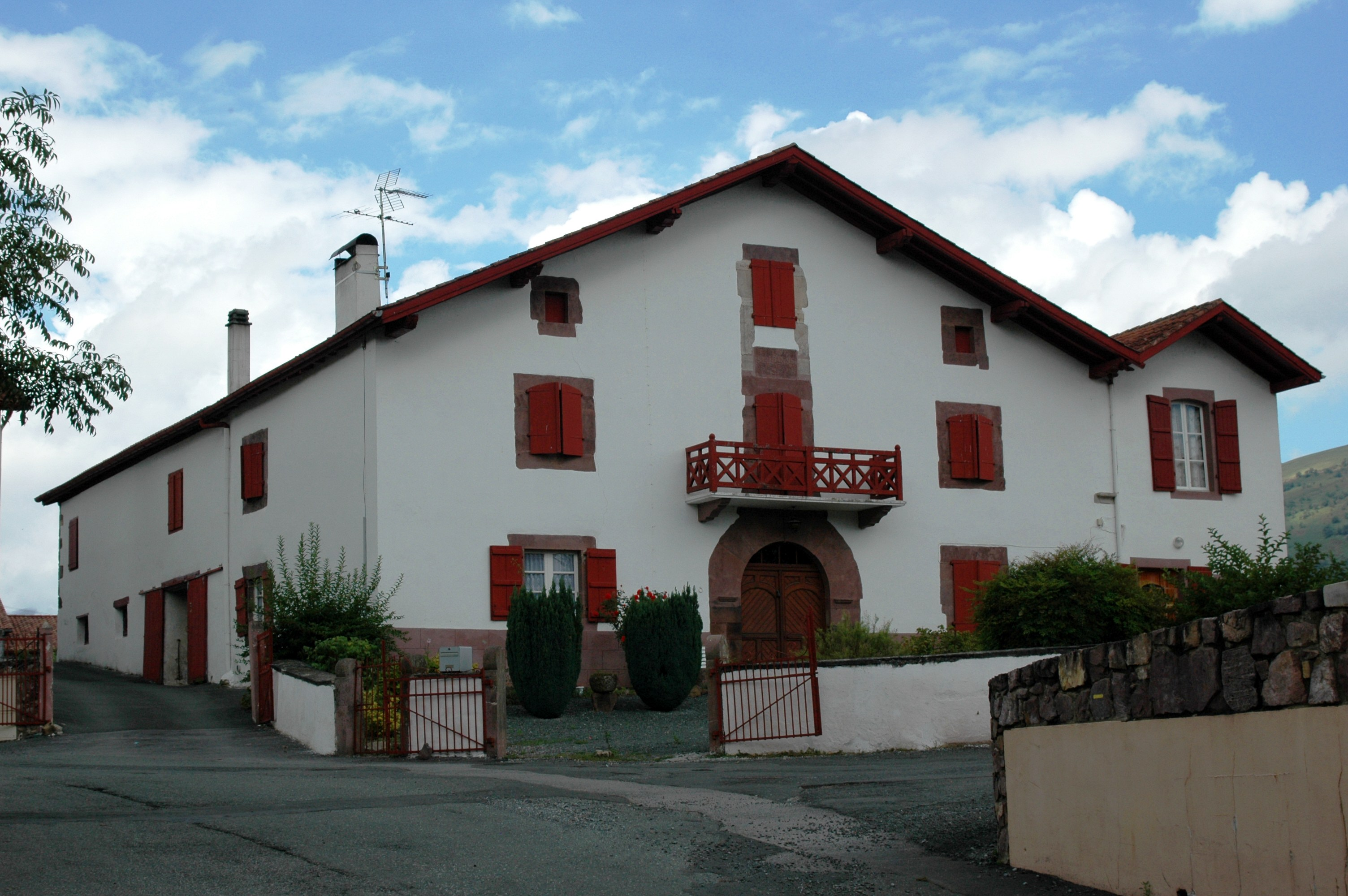
A House in Anhaux

=== Languages ===
According to the Map of the Seven Provinces edited in 1863 by Prince Louis-Lucien Bonaparte, the basque dialect spoken in Anhaux is western Lower Navarre.

=== Civil heritage ===
The commune has a number of buildings and structures that are registered as historical monuments:

- The Jauregia house (14th century)
- The Laxaga house (15th century)
- The Eiherartia farmhouse (1730)
- Houses and Farms (18th - 20th century)

=== Religious heritage ===
The Church of Saint John the Baptist (Middle Ages) is registered as an historical monument. It was almost entirely rebuilt in 1838. Its cemetery has some Hilarri.

Hilarri in the Cemetery

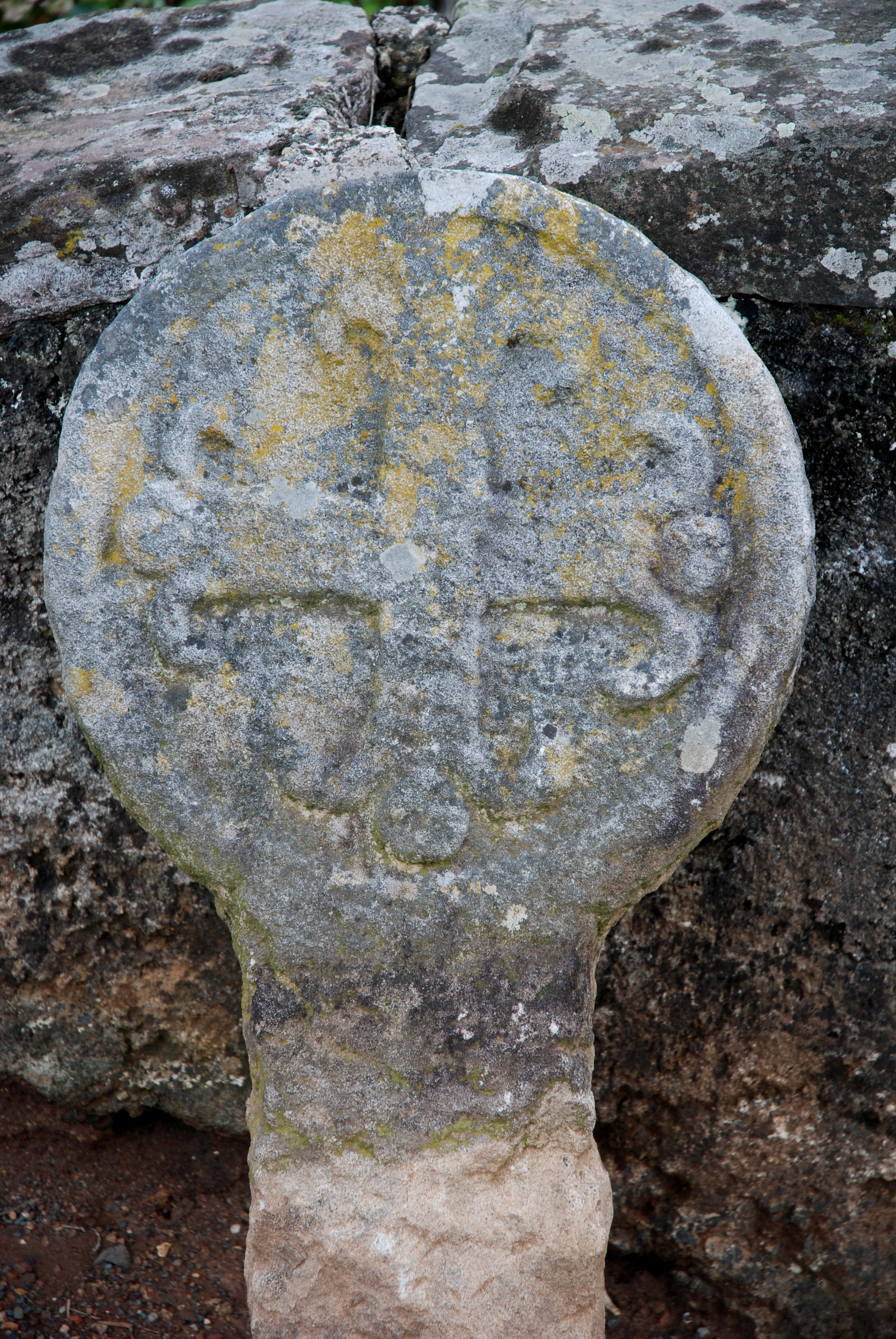

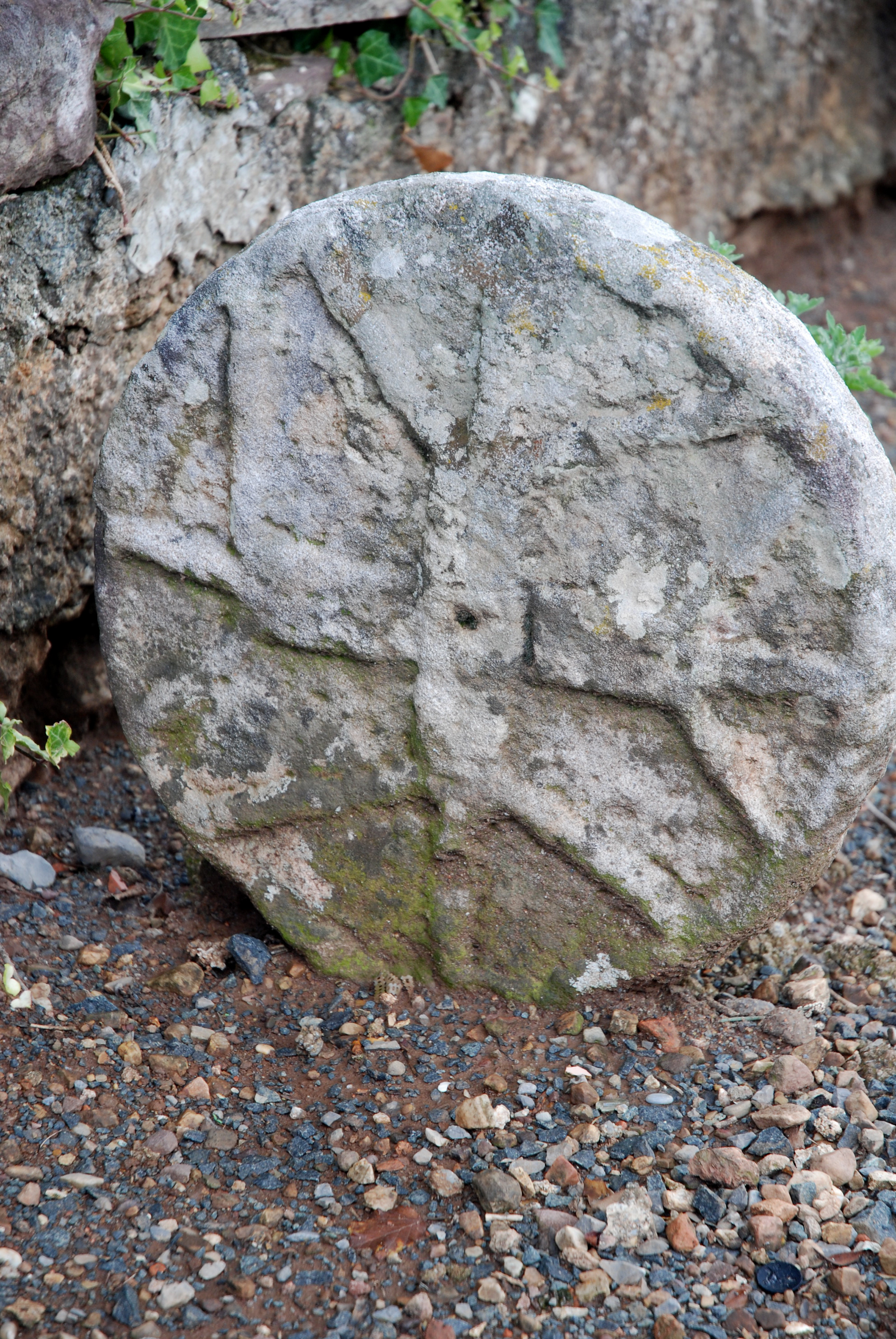

=== Environmental Heritage ===
- The Adartza (1,250m) is a mountain located between Saint-Étienne-de-Baïgorry, Lasse, and Anhaux.
- The Artzaïnharria is 971m high
- The Arrolakoharria, between Banca, Saint-Étienne-de-Baïgorry, and Anhaux, is 1,060m high.
- The Munhoa (or Monhoa) (1,021m) is a mountain located between Saint-Étienne-de-Baïgorry and Saint-Jean-Pied-de-Port. It can be accessed via Anhaux, Lasse, or Saint-Étienne-de-Baïgorry by the GR10.

== Notable people linked to the commune ==
Jean Iraçabal, born in 1851 at Anhaux and died in 1929 (buried at Saint-Étienne-de-Baïgorry), was a decorated French military officer.

== See also ==
- Communes of the Pyrénées-Atlantiques department
