= Irulegi (disambiguation) =

Irulegi ([iɾuˈleɡi]) is the Basque name for Irouléguy, a commune in the Pyrénées-Atlantiques department in south-western France.

It may also refer to:

- A Basque surname, in Spanish Irulegui
- Irouléguy AOC, a wine
- Hand of Irulegi, an archeological artefact with Basque inscriptions
- José Antonio Irulegui, a Spanish former footballer
- Irulegi (mountain), a mountain in the Aranguren municipality in Navarre in the Spanish Basque country (Basque: eu:Irulegi (Aranguren))
- Irulegi castle, a castle on the mountain (Basque: eu:Irulegiko gaztelua; Spanish: es:Castillo de Irulegui)
