= Irouléguy AOC =

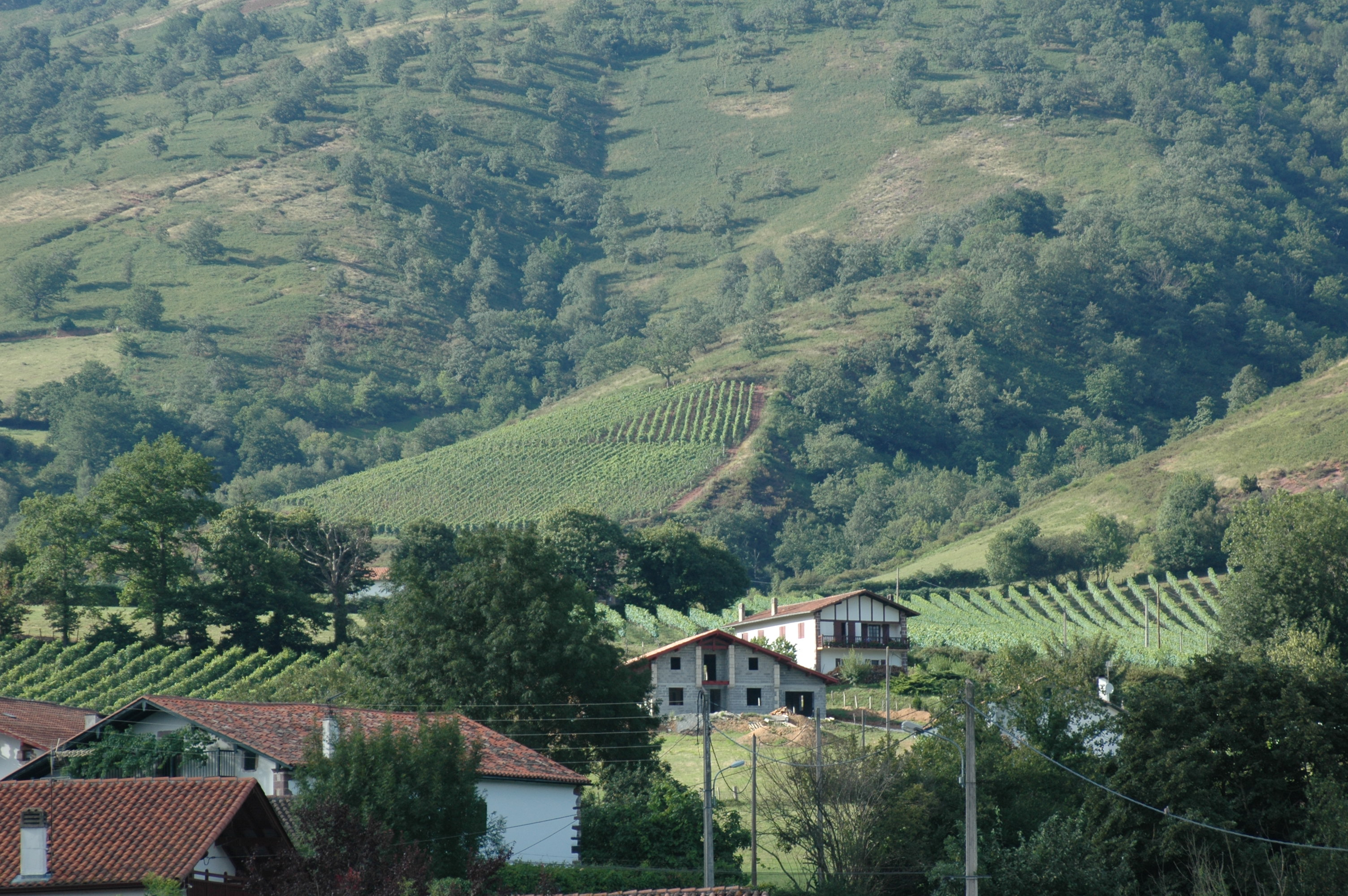
The village of Irouléguy and vineyards

Irouléguy AOC wines (French pronunciation: [iʁuleɡi]; Basque: Irulegi, Basque pronunciation: [iɾuˈleɡi]) come from Lower Navarre in the Northern Basque Country, France and are usually considered as part of the wine region of South West France (Sud-Ouest). They are named after the village of Irouléguy and are the only wines with AOC certification in the Northern Basque Country. Irouléguy wines are often referred to as coming from "the smallest vineyard in France, the biggest in the Northern Basque Country".

Currently about 550,000 litres are produced annually, with about 70% of production being red wines, 20% rosé and 10% white.

== History ==
The history of wine-making in the area goes back to at least the 3rd century when the Romans commented on wine-making in the area. It was boosted by monks of the Abbey of Roncesvalles in the 11th century who planted the first large scale vineyards to provide wine for pilgrims travelling along the Way of St James. Following the Treaty of the Pyrenees in 1659, the monks had to give up wine-making and the vineyards which were taken over by the local villagers.

During its peak in the 17th century, the Irouléguy vineyards comprised some 500 ha of cultivated land. The production of wine had been boosted considerably by the then Viscount of Urdos who encouraged the locals to grow grapes even on the steep slopes. The 18th century saw relatively high levels of employment in the area due to increased mining activity, further boosting the consumption and thus production of local wine. But the following period was marked by constant decline and the vineyards were hit hard by the Great French Wine Blight in 1912 and by the 1980s, only some 70ha were still in cultivation. A cooperative was formed in 1952 under the lead of Alexander Bergouignan to rescue the situation and to work towards certification. The wines of Baigorri, Anhauze and Irouléguy were awarded AOVDQS certification in 1953 and Irouléguy was granted AOC status in October 1970. Today, some 210ha of land are cultivated again in the area.

Prior to AOC certification, a much larger number of varieties were grown, including Kroxenta, Pikapota, Kamalua, Mantzinga, Bordalesa, Erre Mantxaua and Pino beltza.

== Location ==
Of the 15 wine-growing municipalities in the Irouléguy region, only the following nine grow Irouléguy vines on a total of 210ha: Anhaux, Saint-Étienne-de-Baïgorry, Ascarat, Irouléguy, Bidarrai, Ispoure, Jaxu and Saint-Martin-d'Arrossa.

The other municipalities (Aincille, Bussunarits-Sarrasquette, Bustince-Iriberry, Lasse, Lecumberry, Ossès, Saint-Jean-le-Vieux) grow other vines.

The vineyards are often located on extremely steep slopes with inclines of up to 60°. This has led to the development of special growing and terracing techniques by Basque wine-growers to enable the cultivation of vines on these slopes.

== Wine ==
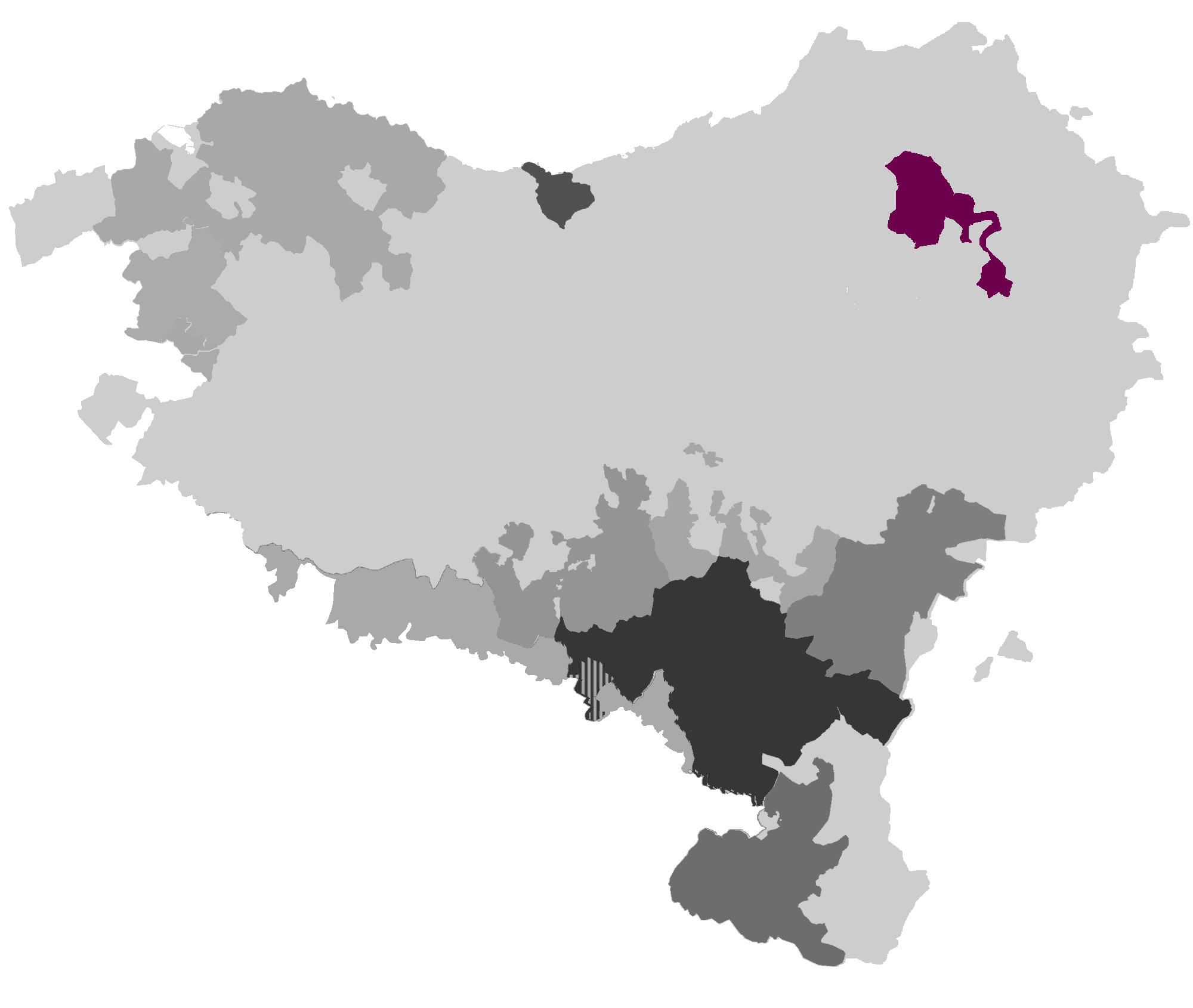
The Irouléguy vineyards within the Basque Country Irouléguy wine region

Red grape varieties include Bordelesa Beltza (Tannat), Axeria (Cabernet Franc) and Axeria Handia (Cabernet Sauvignon), while white wines are made from Xuri Zerratia (Courbu), Izkiriota Ttipia (Petit Manseng) and Izkiriota (Gros Manseng).

They are cultivated on terraces between 100-400 m above sea-level and although the soils vary, one of the chief characteristics of the soils in the region is a deep red coloration. This fact is mirrored in the name of the nearby town of Baigorri which is a contraction of bailara gorri "red terrace".

== See also ==
- Basque breeds and cultivars
- Basque cider
- Txakoli
