= Ossès =

Ossès Ortzaize (Basque)
- Commune
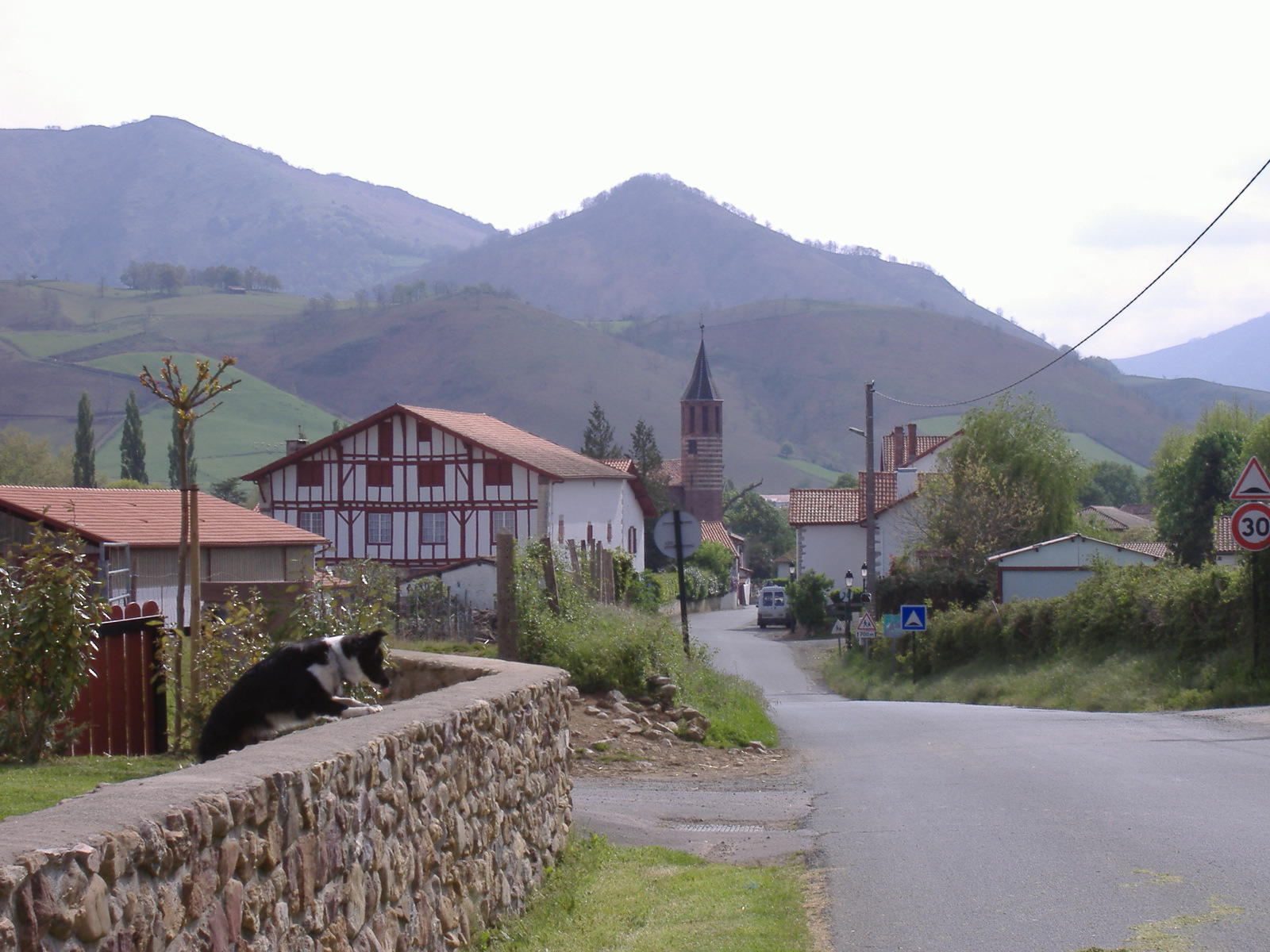
- Road to Ossès

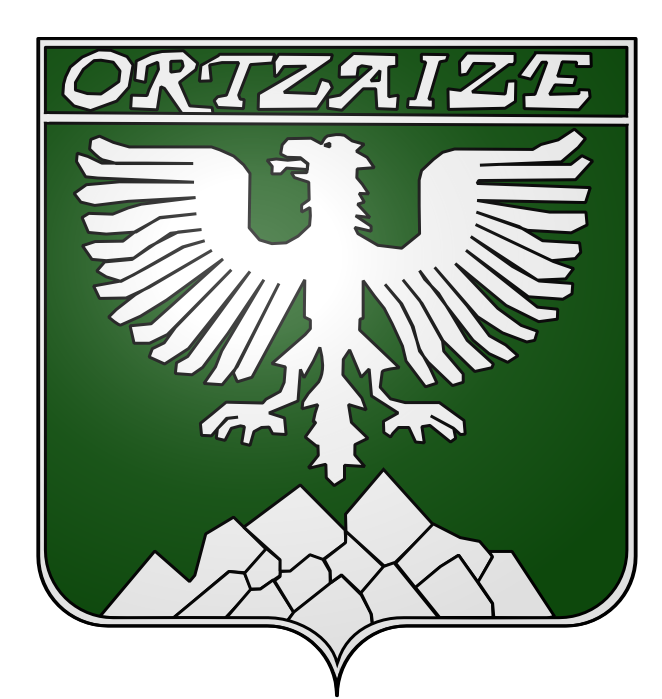
- Coat of arms
- Location of Ossès
- Location within France Location within Nouvelle-Aquitaine
- Coordinates: 43°14′34″N 1°17′01″W
- Country: France
- Region: Nouvelle-Aquitaine
- Department: Pyrénées-Atlantiques
- Arrondissement: Bayonne
- Canton: Montagne Basque
- Intercommunality: CA Pays Basque

Government
  - Mayor (2020–2026): Jean-Marc Oçafrain
- Area^{1}: 42 km^{2} (16 sq mi)
- Elevation: 282 m (925 ft)
- Highest elevation: 892 m (2,927 ft)
- Lowest elevation: 101 m (331 ft)
- Population (2023): 878
  - Density: 21/km^{2} (54/sq mi)
- Time zone: UTC+01:00 (CET)
  - Summer (DST): UTC+02:00 (CEST)
- INSEE/Postal code: 64436 /64780
- ^{1} French Land Register data, which excludes lakes, ponds, glaciers > 1 km^{2} (0.386 sq mi or 247 acres) and river estuaries.

Ossès (French pronunciation: [ɔsɛs]; Basque: Ortzaize) is a commune in the Pyrénées-Atlantiques department in south-western France.

Ossès lies in the traditional Basque province of Lower Navarre.

== Geography ==
Ossès is located 13 kilometres (8 mi) north-west of Saint-Jean-Pied-de-Port, in the foothills of the Pyrenees. It is surrounded by low hills in the Ossès valley, a part of the valley of the river Nive, home of the pottok, the wild Basque horse. The surrounding countryside is considered very beautiful, with several trails, long-distance walks and picnic sites. The air was described as coming 'straight from heaven' by a local poet.

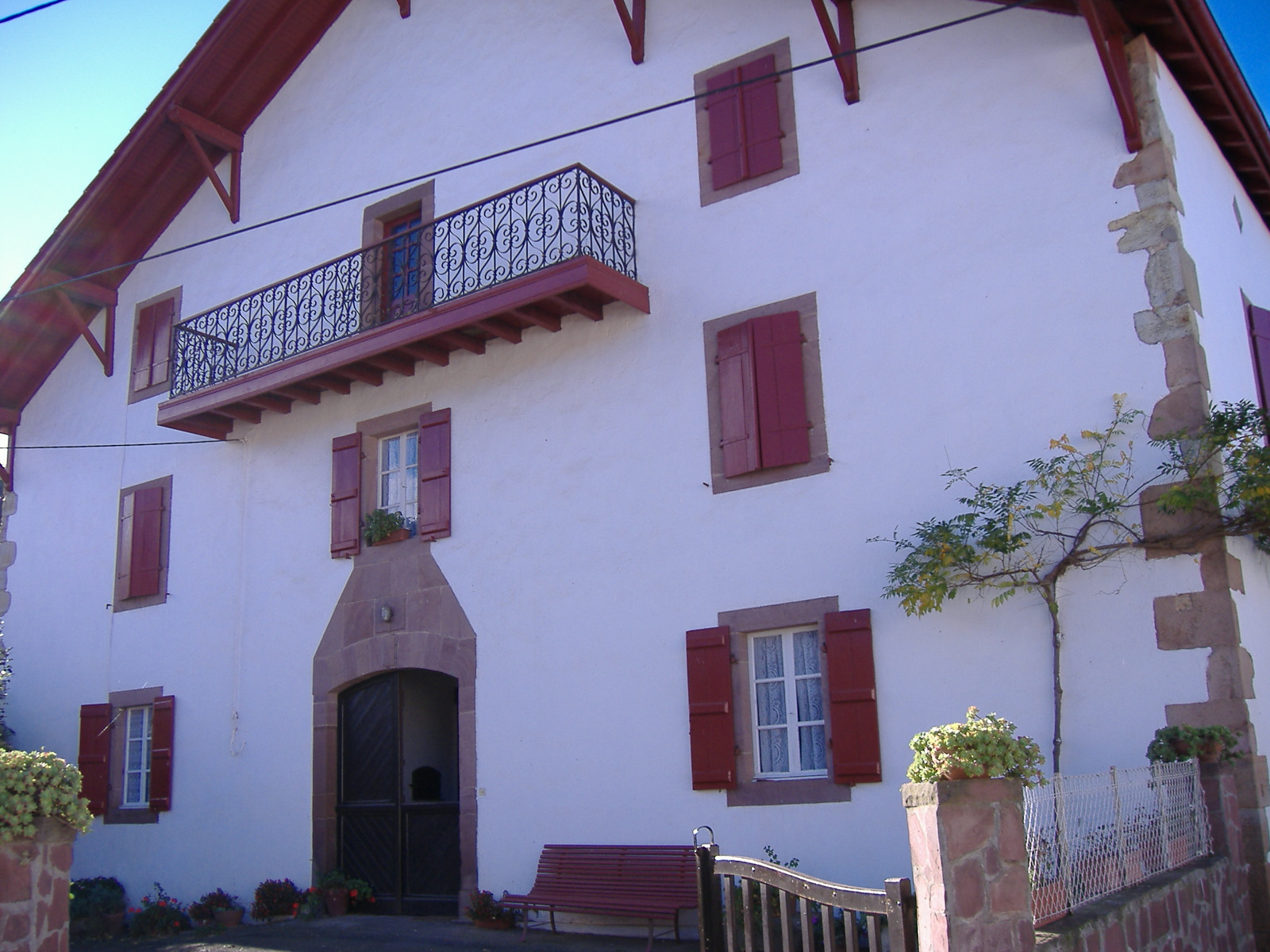
Basque house

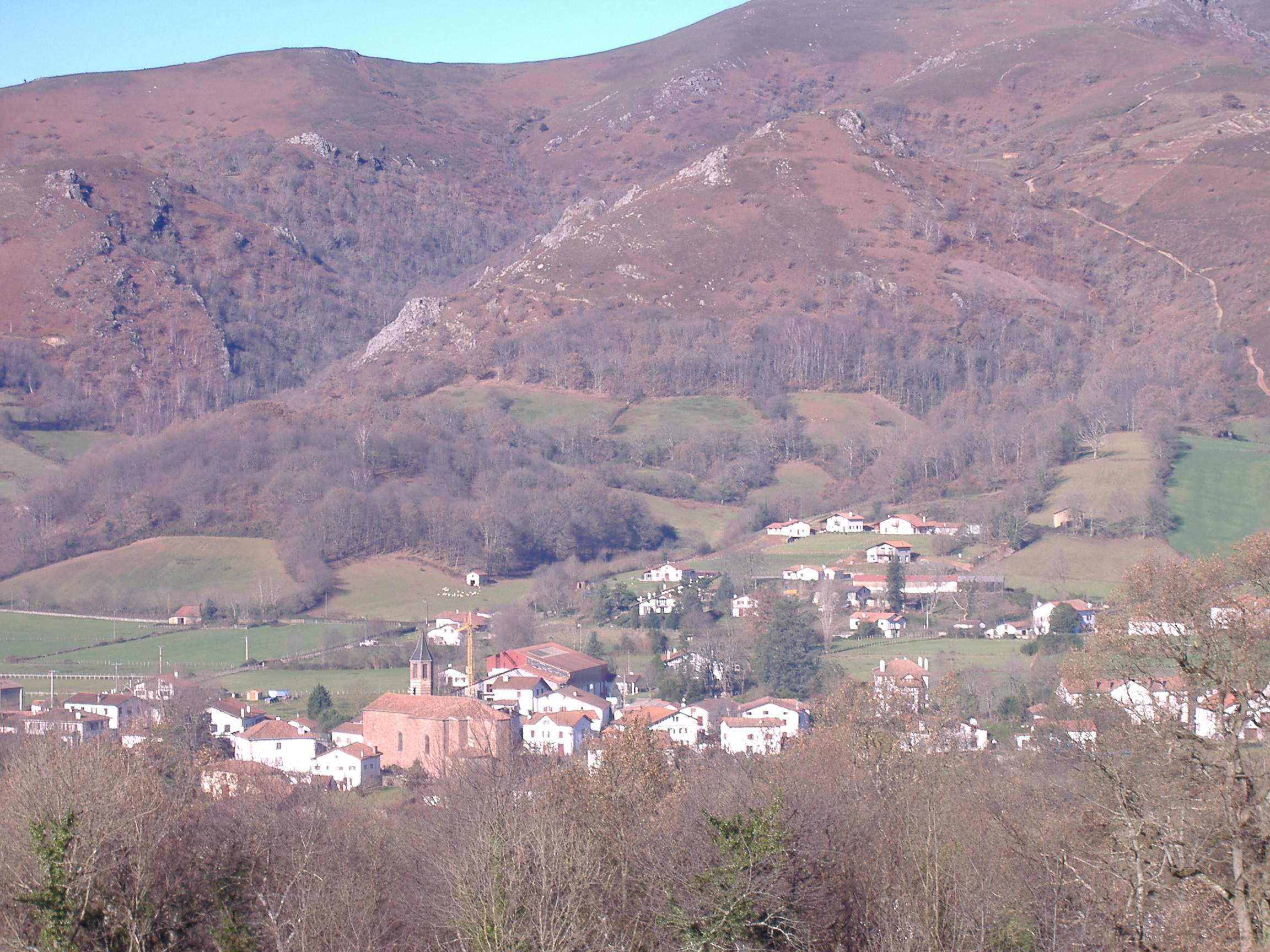
Church in the center of the village

=== Neighboring communes ===
- Saint-Jean-Pied-de-Port
- Bidarray
- Saint-Martin-d'Arrossa
- Saint-Étienne-de-Baïgorry

== History ==
The village was under the authority of the Dukes of Gascogne, then of Aquitaine, but was passed to the Kingdom of Navarre with the marriage of Princess Berengaria of Navarre, daughter of King Sancho the Wise, to Richard the Lionheart in 1191.

Ossès had the status of a canton but lost this after the French Revolution.

== Sights ==
The village has a splendid sixteenth century church, St-Julien, with a unique heptagonal tower, a famous altarpiece and a pelota fronton forming one of its walls. The graveyard has a small number of stone Basque crosses. There are several traditional Basque houses around the square, characterised by their pink sandstone lintels and half-timbers, including the 1628 Maison Sastriarena, where the Bishops of Bayonne were entertained, and the Maison Harizmendi, where the prelate who married Louis XIV and Maria Theresa stayed in 1660 on his way to the wedding party. The old laundry building has also been preserved.

== Economy ==
The well-known Irouléguy wine and Ossau-Iraty cheese are produced in the area, with tourism, crafts and agriculture key parts of the local economy.

== Transport ==
Ossès-Saint-Martin-d'Arrossa is a railway station on the railway line between Bayonne and Saint-Jean-Pied-de-Port with several services each day. It is 1 km (0.62 mi) from the village. A bus to Saint-Étienne-de-Baïgorry connects with the rail service.

== Village festival ==
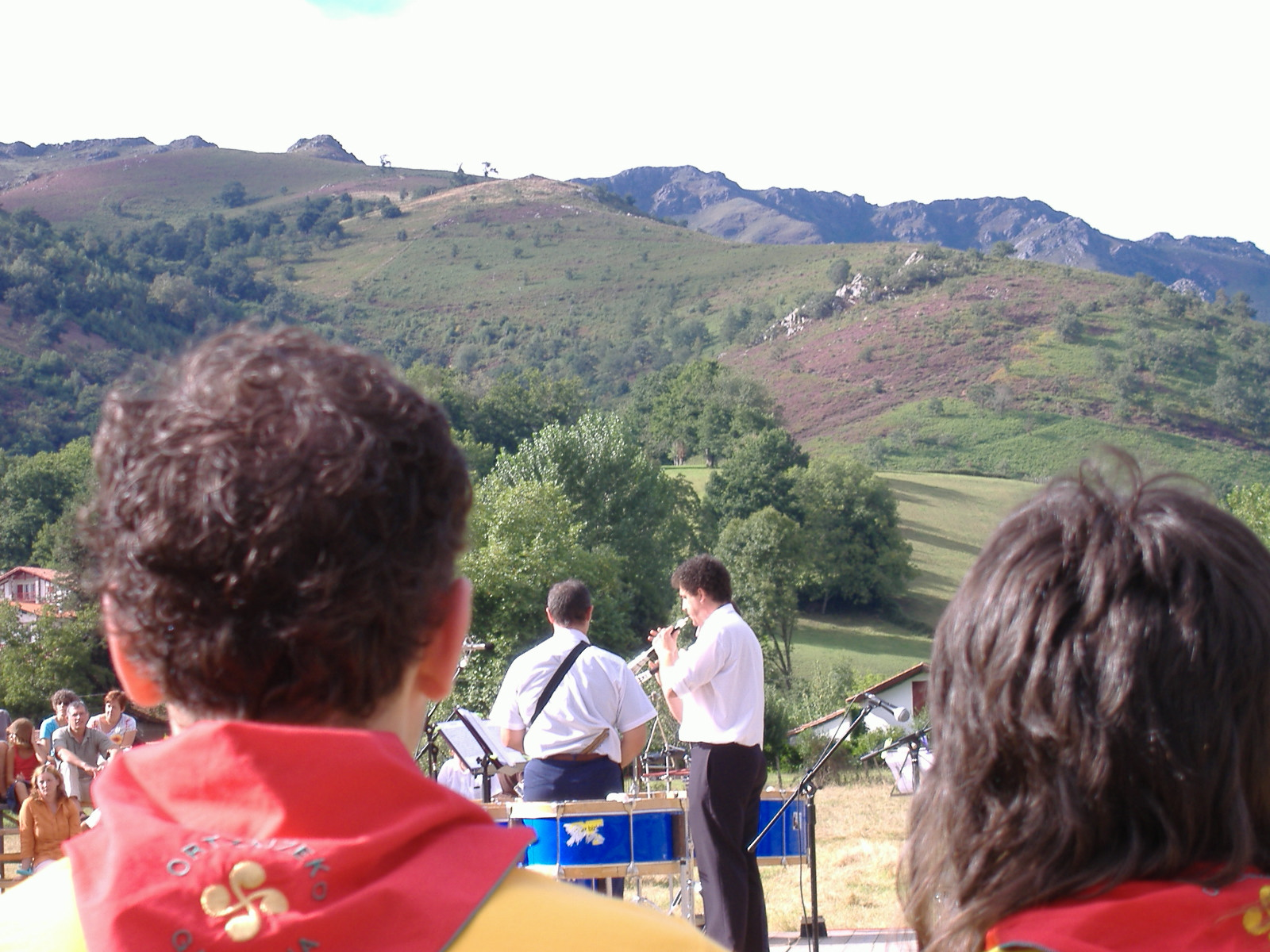
The village festival

The village festival is on the last Sunday in August.

== See also ==
- Communes of the Pyrénées-Atlantiques department
