= Saint-Jean-Pied-de-Port =

Saint-Jean-Pied-de-Port Donibane Garazi (Basque)
- Commune
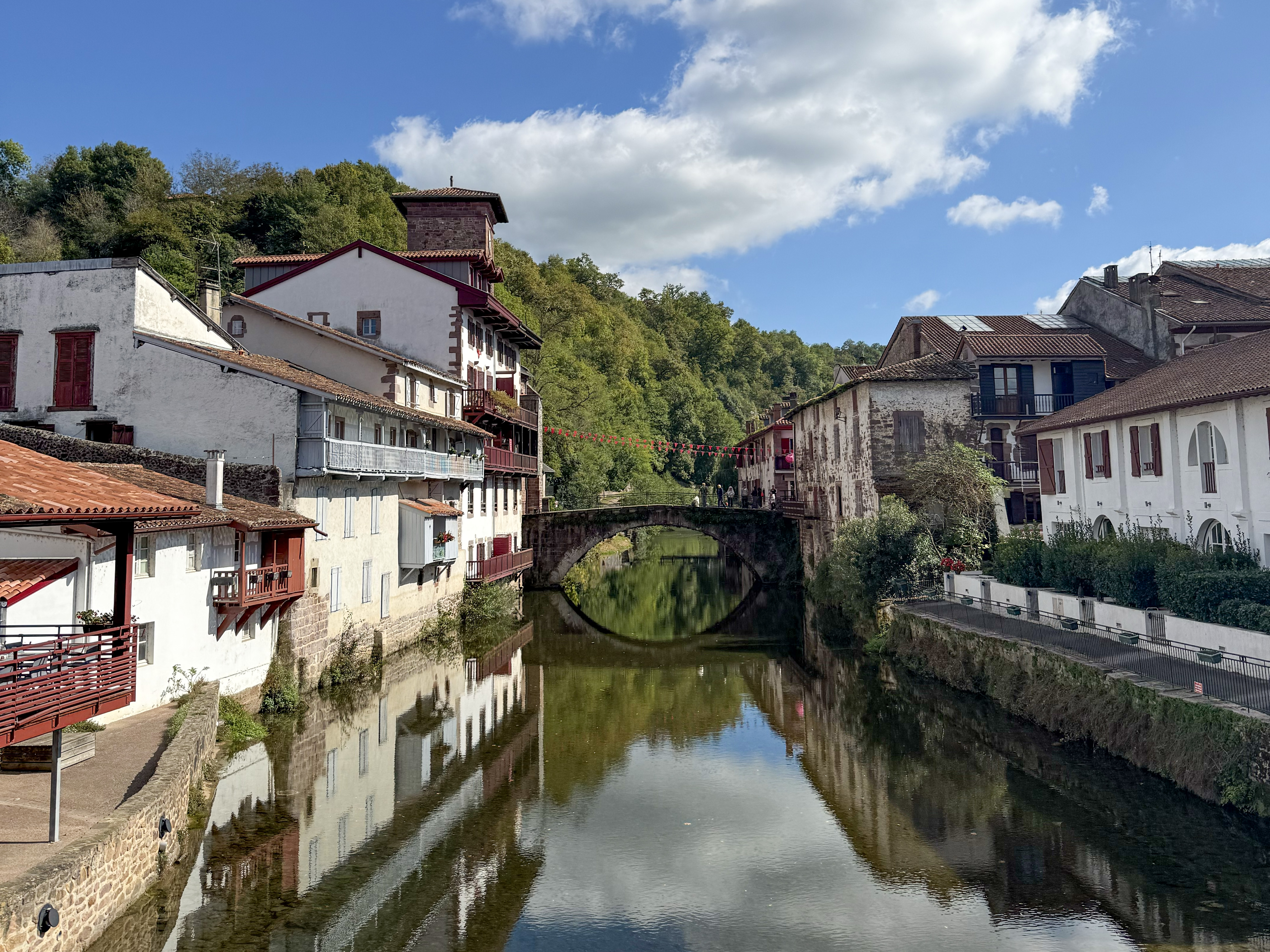
- Saint-Jean-Pied-de-Port in 2025

- Coat of arms
- Location of Saint-Jean-Pied-de-Port
- Location within France Location within Nouvelle-Aquitaine
- Coordinates: 43°09′54″N 1°14′08″W
- Country: France
- Region: Nouvelle-Aquitaine
- Department: Pyrénées-Atlantiques
- Arrondissement: Bayonne
- Canton: Montagne Basque
- Intercommunality: CA Pays Basque

Government
  - Mayor (2020–2026): Laurent Inchauspé
- Area^{1}: 2.73 km^{2} (1.05 sq mi)
- Elevation: 180 m (590 ft)
- Highest elevation: 320 m (1,050 ft)
- Lowest elevation: 159 m (522 ft)
- Population (2023): 1,479
  - Density: 542/km^{2} (1,400/sq mi)
- Time zone: UTC+01:00 (CET)
  - Summer (DST): UTC+02:00 (CEST)
- INSEE/Postal code: 64485 /64220
- ^{1} French Land Register data, which excludes lakes, ponds, glaciers > 1 km^{2} (0.386 sq mi or 247 acres) and river estuaries.

Saint-Jean-Pied-de-Port (literally "Saint John [at the] Foot of [the] Pass"; Basque: Donibane Garazi; Occitan: Sant Joan de Pei de Port) is a commune in the Pyrénées-Atlantiques department in south-western France. It is close to Ostabat in the Pyrenean foothills. The town is the old capital of the traditional Basque province of Lower Navarre. Saint-Jean-Pied-de-Port is the second most popular starting point of the French Way (Camino Francés). It is a member of Les Plus Beaux Villages de France (The Most Beautiful Villages of France) Association.

== Geography ==
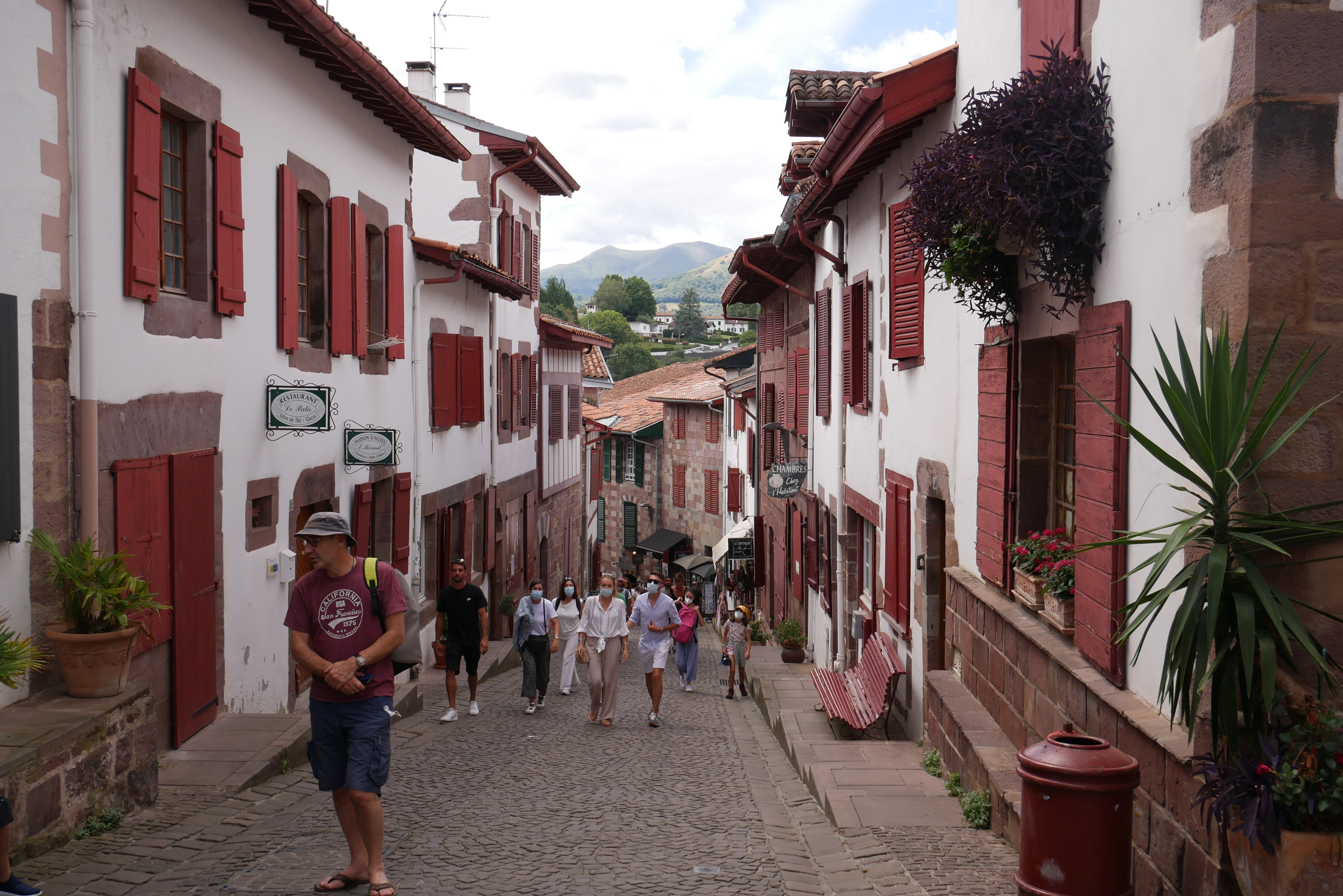
Saint-Jean-Pied-de-Port old town

The town lies on the river Nive, 8 km (5.0 mi) from the Spanish border, and is the head town of the region of Basse-Navarre (Lower Navarre in English) and was classified among the Most Beautiful Villages of France in 2016. The Pays de Saint-Jean-Pied-de-Port, also called Pays de Cize (Garazi in Basque), is the region surrounding Saint-Jean-Pied-Port. The town's layout is essentially one main street with sandstone walls encircling. It is about 50 kilometres (31 mi) by air and 75 kilometres (47 mi) on road away from Pamplona (Basque: Iruña), the capital of Upper Navarre, across the Spanish border.

=== Neighbouring towns and villages ===
- Saint-Jean-le-Vieux
- Ossès
- Baigorri
- Estérençuby
- Ispoure
- Uhart-Cize
- Arnéguy
- Luzaide/Valcarlos (Spain)

== History ==
Map of Saint-Jean-Pied-de-Port (1751)

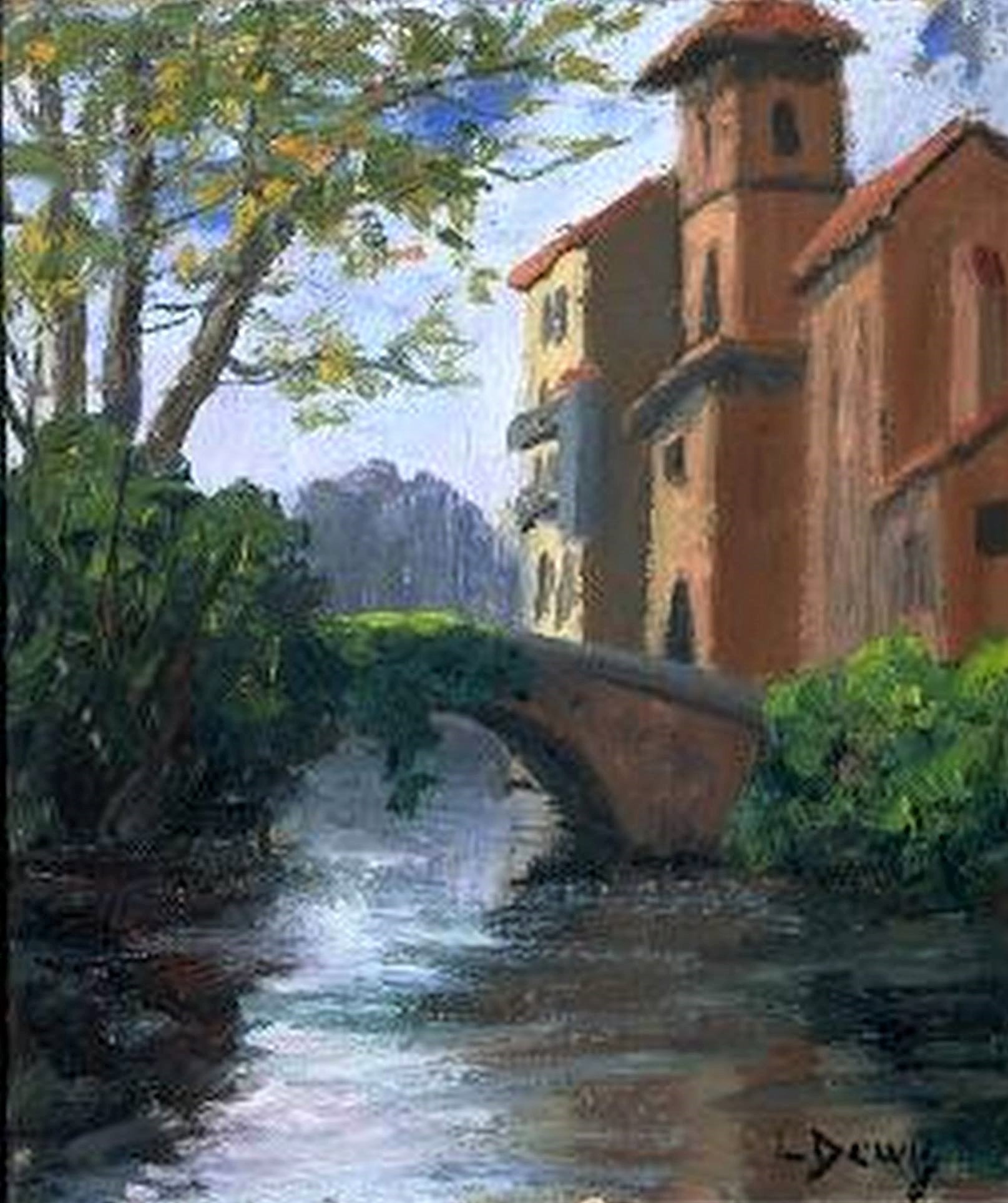
Bridge at Saint-Jean-Pied-de-Port, 1940 by Louis Dewis

The original town at nearby Saint-Jean-le-Vieux was razed to the ground in 1177 by the troops of Richard the Lionheart after a siege. The Kings of Navarre refounded the town on its present site shortly afterwards.

The town was thereafter a town of the Kingdom of Navarre, and the seat of the sheriff of the Lower Navarre district ("merindad" of Ultrapuertos or Deça-Ports). It remained as such up to the period of the Spanish conquest (1512-1528) when King Henry II of Navarre decided to transfer the seat of the royal institutions to Saint Palais (Donapaleu) on safety grounds.

In 1998, the Porte St-Jacques (city gate) was added to the UNESCO World Heritage Sites as part of the sites along the Routes of Santiago de Compostela in France.

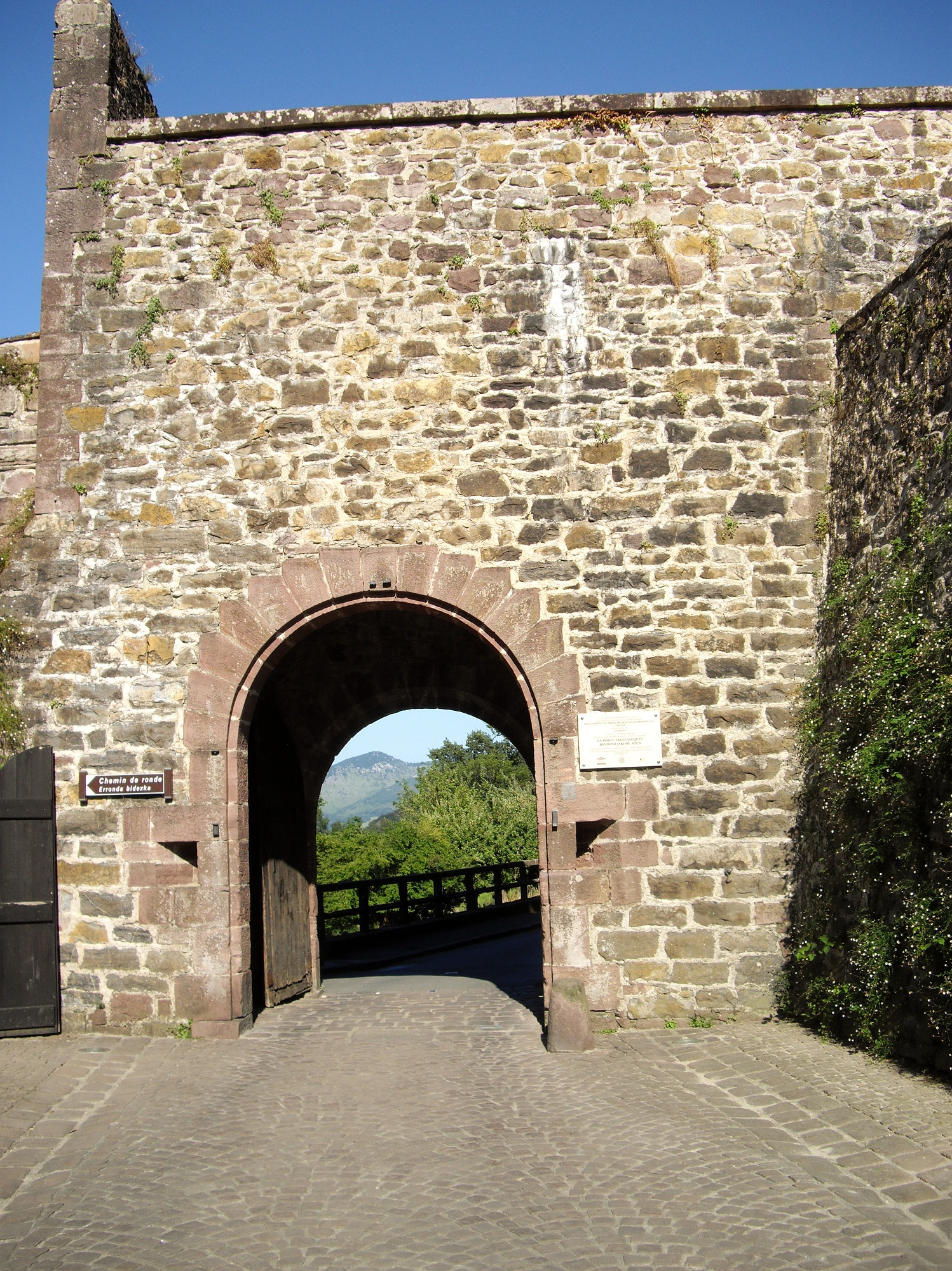
Porte Saint-Jacques (Saint-Jean-Pied-de-Port)

== Camino de Santiago ==
The town has traditionally been an important point on the Way of St. James, the pilgrimage to Santiago de Compostela, as it stands at the base of the Roncevaux Pass across the Pyrenees. Pied-de-Port means 'foot of the pass' in Pyrenean French. The routes from Paris, Vézelay and Le Puy-en-Velay meet at Saint-Jean-Pied-de-Port and it was the pilgrims' last stop before the arduous mountain crossing.

In 2024 over 32,000 pilgrims headed from this town in the direction of Santiago de Compostela. Out of all people on the French Way who got the certificate of accomplishment about 14% started in Saint-Jean-Pied-de-Port. Most pilgrims who started in this town arrive in Santiago in May, June and October.

91% of people did the pilgrimage on foot and 7% by bike. In contrast to Sarria, starting from Saint-Jean-Pied-de-Port is mainly popular among foreigners comprising a wide mix of nationalities: The most pilgrims are Americans (16.8%), South Koreans (13.5%) and Italians (9.5%). People from Spain rank fourth.

== Main sights ==
The cobbled rue de la Citadelle runs down hill and over the river from the fifteenth century Porte St-Jacques to the Porte d'Espagne by the bridge. From the bridge, there are views of the old houses with balconies overlooking the Nive. Many of the buildings are very old, built of pink and grey schist, and retain distinctive features, including inscriptions over their doors. One, a bakery, lists the price of wheat in 1789.

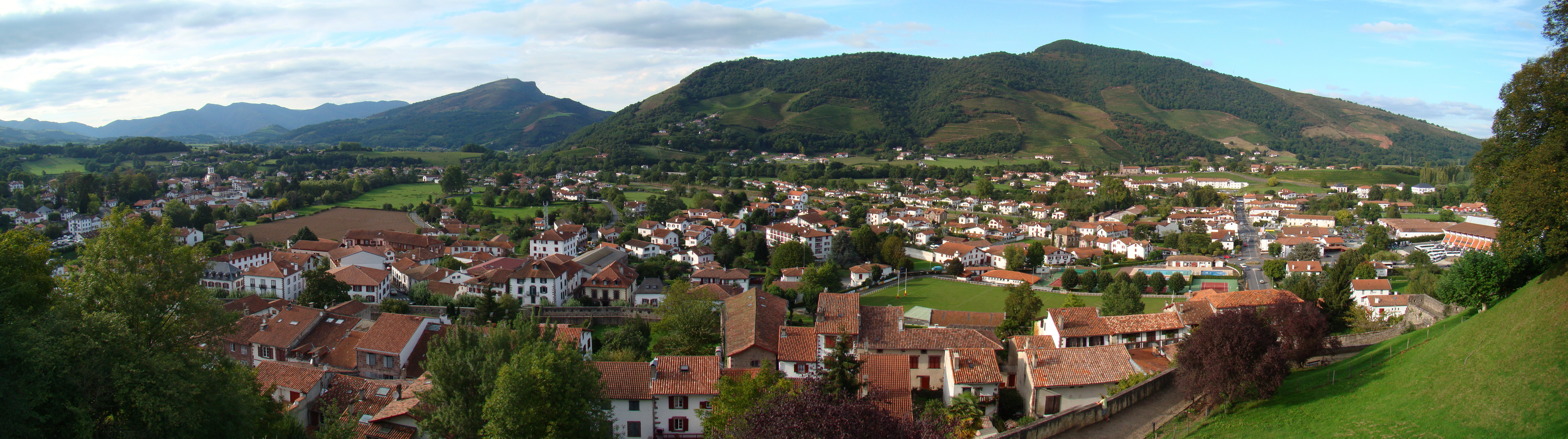
A panorama view of St Jean as seen from the Citadelle in 2010.

The 14th-century red schist Gothic church, Notre-Dame-du-Bout-du-Pont, stands by the Porte d'Espagne. The original was built by Sancho the Strong of Navarre to commemorate the 1212 Battle of Las Navas de Tolosa where Moorish dominance of Spain was undermined.

Above the town at the top of the hill is the citadel, remodelled by Vauban in the 17th century.

Outside the walls is a new town, with the Hôtel de Ville and a pelota fronton.

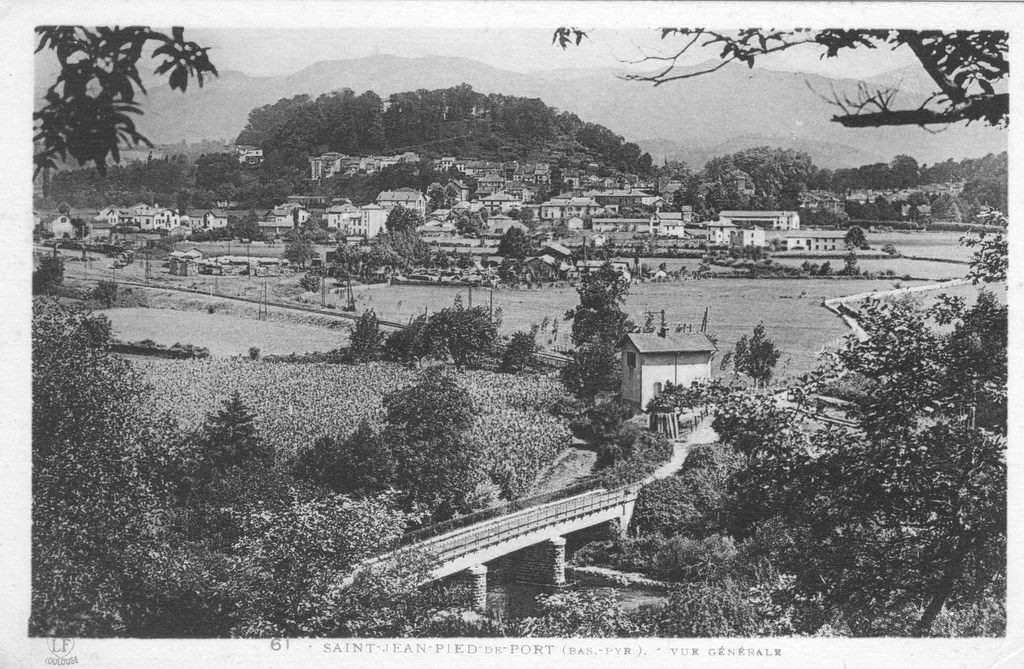
Saint-Jean-Pied-de-Port in the early 20th century

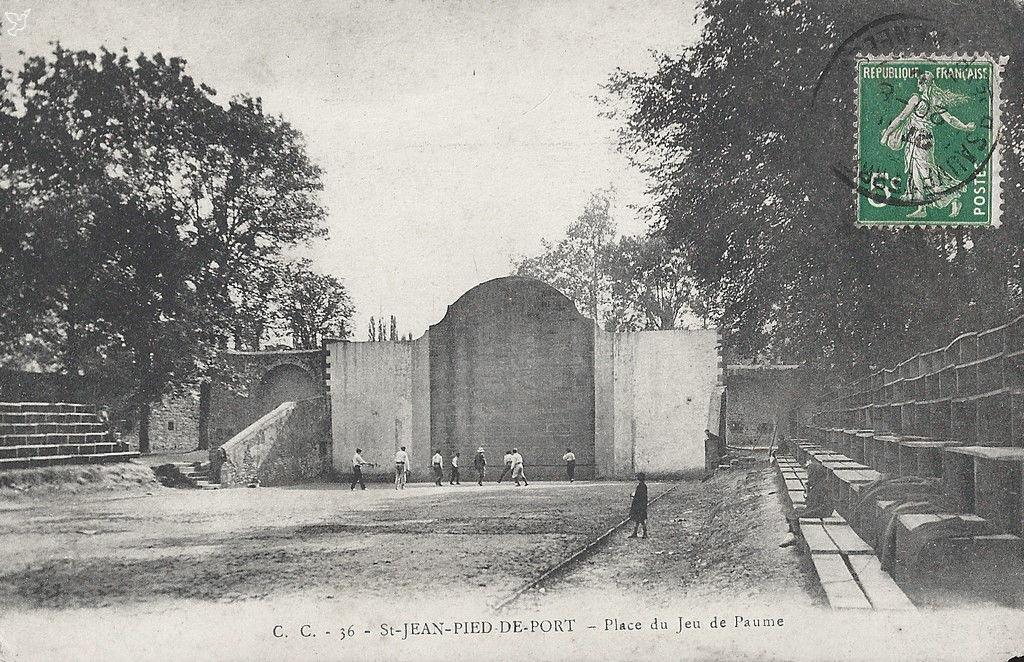
pelota fronton.

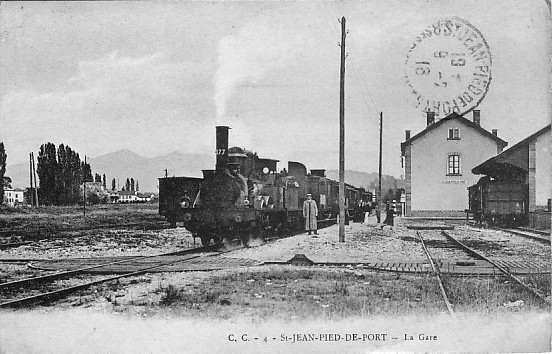
The train station.

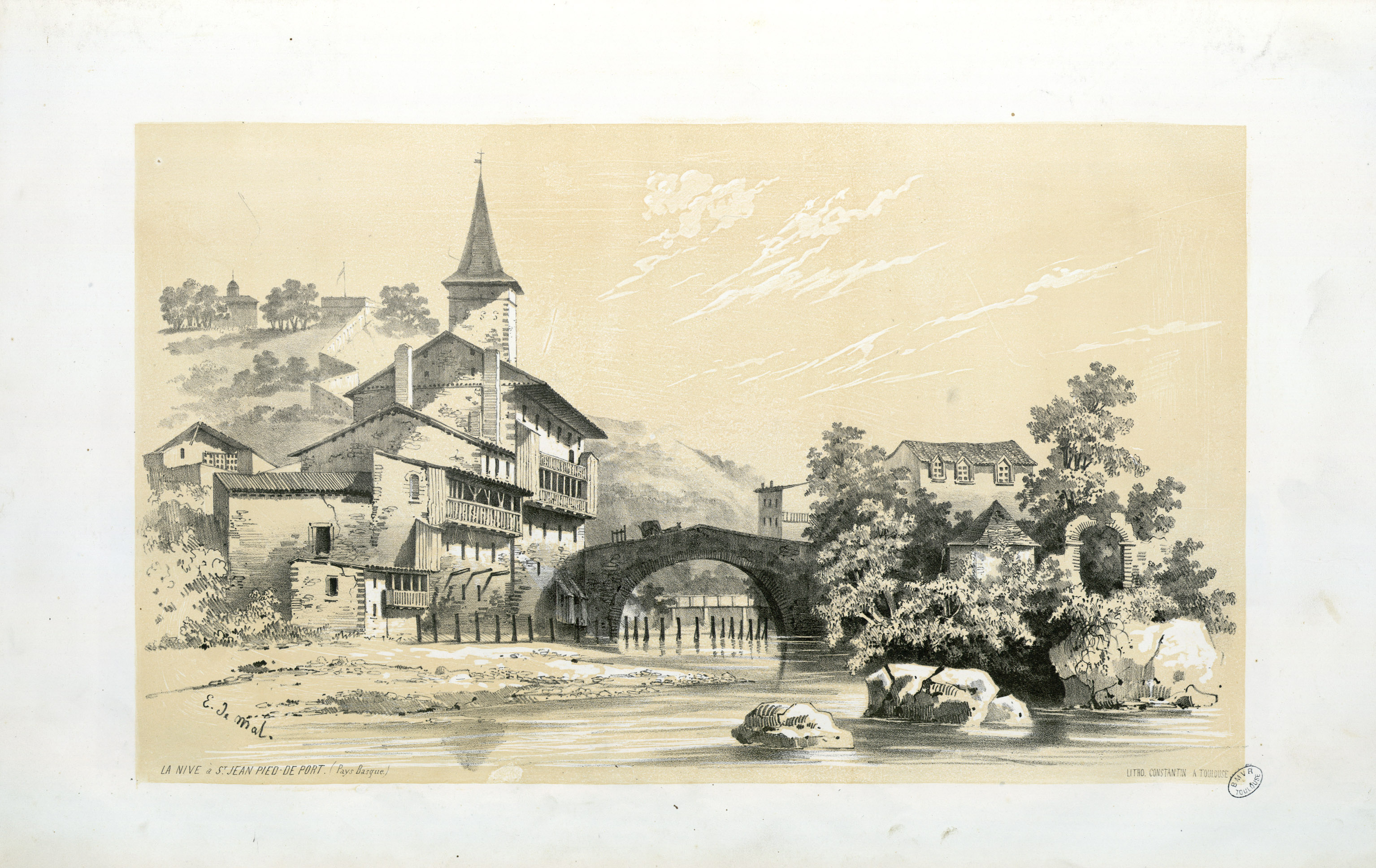
the Nive in Saint-Jean-Pied-de-Port in 1843, by Eugène de Malbos.

== Economy ==
Traditional crafts and foods remain in the town, including Basque linen from the Inchauspé family since 1848. The town is now an important tourist centre for the Pyrenees and the French Basque country and there are shops, restaurants and hotels.

St-Jean-Pied-de-Port specializes in sheep's milk cheese, like the Ossau-Iraty AOP cheese, artisanal trout breeding and piperade omelette with peppers and Bayonne ham.

Mondays see a large market, with sheep and cattle driven into the town. At 5pm, there is a communal game of bare-handed pelote at the fronton. There are large fairs four times a year.

== Transport ==
Saint-Jean-Pied-de-Port station is the southern terminus of the railway line from Bayonne through the French Basque Country, along the valley of the river Nive, with several services each day. It is 1 km from the centre of the town. Biarritz Airport is the closest airport to Saint Jean Pied de Port.

== Notable people ==
- Bernard Etxepare (late 15th - mid 16th century), writer of first printed book in Basque.
- Juan Huarte de San Juan (c. 1530–1592), physician and psychologist was born there.
- Charles Floquet (1828–1896), born in Saint-Jean-Pied-de-Port, French lawyer and statesman.
- Imanol Harinordoquy (born 1980), French international rugby union player, grew up in the town.

== See also ==
- Communes of the Pyrénées-Atlantiques department
