= Nive =

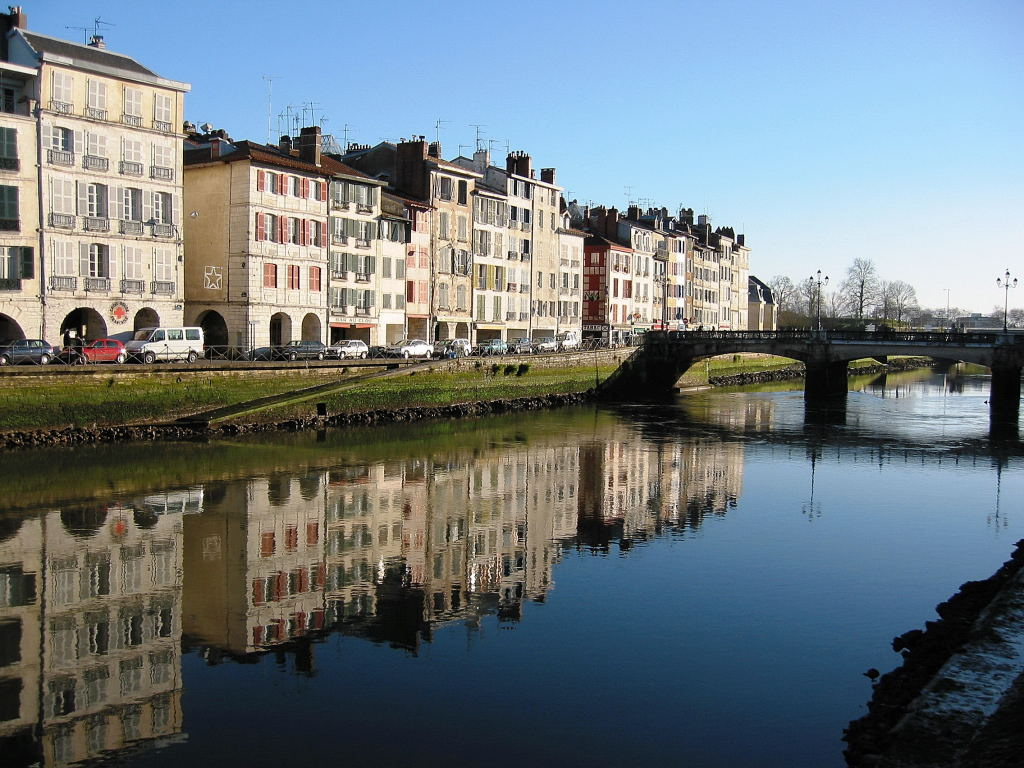
- Nive in Bayonne

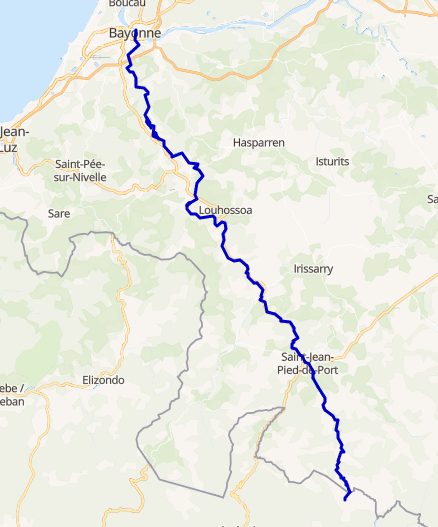

Location
- Country: France

Physical characteristics
- Source
  - location: Pyrenees
  - coordinates: 43°03′38″N 1°11′49″W
- Mouth
  - location: Adour
  - coordinates: 43°29′38″N 1°28′27″W
- Length: 79 km (49 mi)
- Basin size: 1,030 km^{2} (400 sq mi)

Basin features
- Progression: Adour→ Atlantic Ocean

The Nive (French pronunciation: [niv]; Basque: Errobi; Occitan: Niva) is a French river that flows through the French Basque Country. It is a left tributary of the river Adour. It is 78.9 km (49.0 mi) long. The river's source in the Pyrenees in Lower Navarre. The river Nive was made famous by the Le petit Nicolas series.

== Geography ==
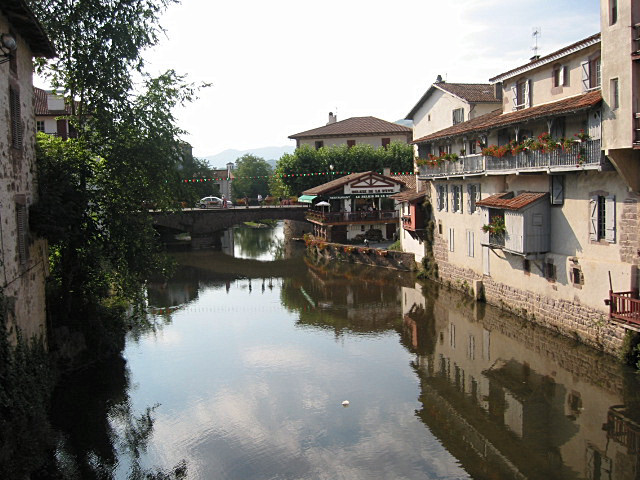
Nive in Saint-Jean-Pied-de-Port

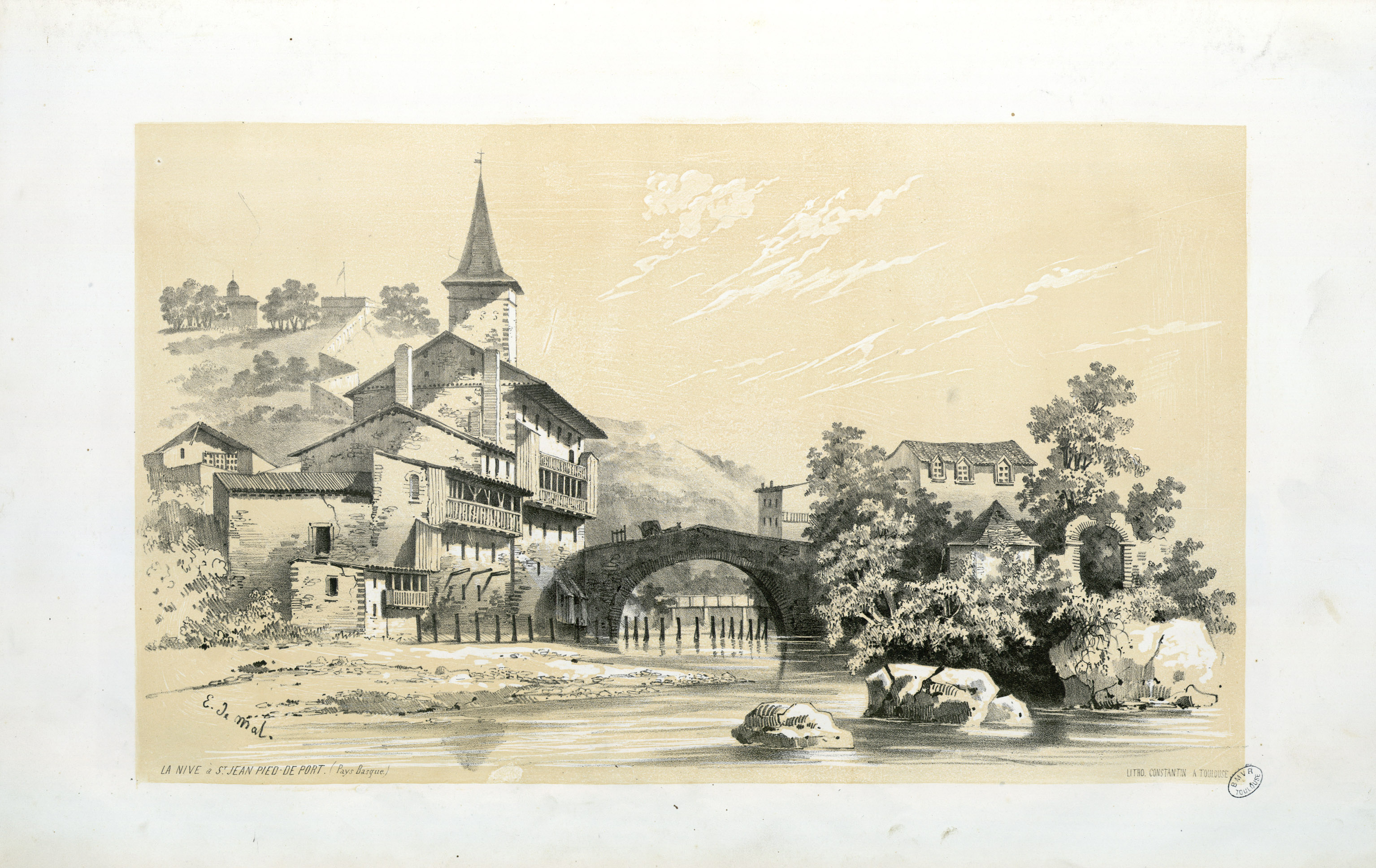
Nive in Saint-Jean-Pied-de-Port in 1843, by Eugène de Malbos

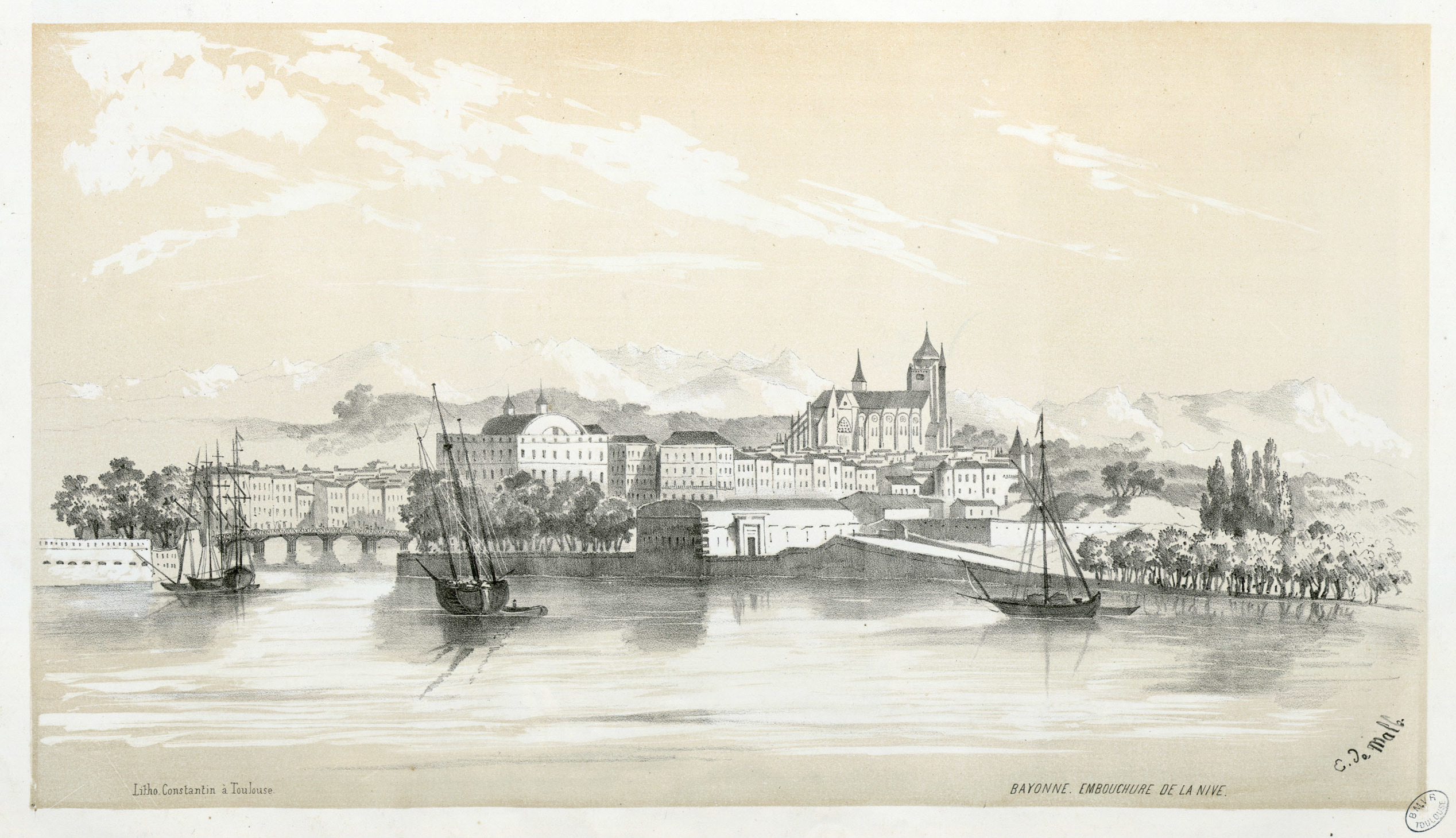
Confluence of the Nive in Bayonne in 1843, by Eugène de Malbos

The Nive proper is formed from three head rivers in Saint-Jean-Pied-de-Port:

- The Nive de Béhérobie (main stream)
- The Laurhibar
- The Nive d'Arnéguy.

The Nive passes through the towns of Estérençuby (Nive de Béhérobie), Saint-Jean-Pied-de-Port, Bidarray, Cambo-les-Bains, Ustaritz, Villefranque and Bayonne, where it flows into the Adour.

== Principal tributaries ==
- Ezterrengibel or Esterenguibel
- Nive des Aldudes, from Saint-Étienne-de-Baïgorry
- Laka, from Ossès
- Baztan, from Bidarray
- Latsa, from Espelette

== See also ==
- Battle of the Nive
