= Irouléguy =

Irouléguy Irulegi
- Commune
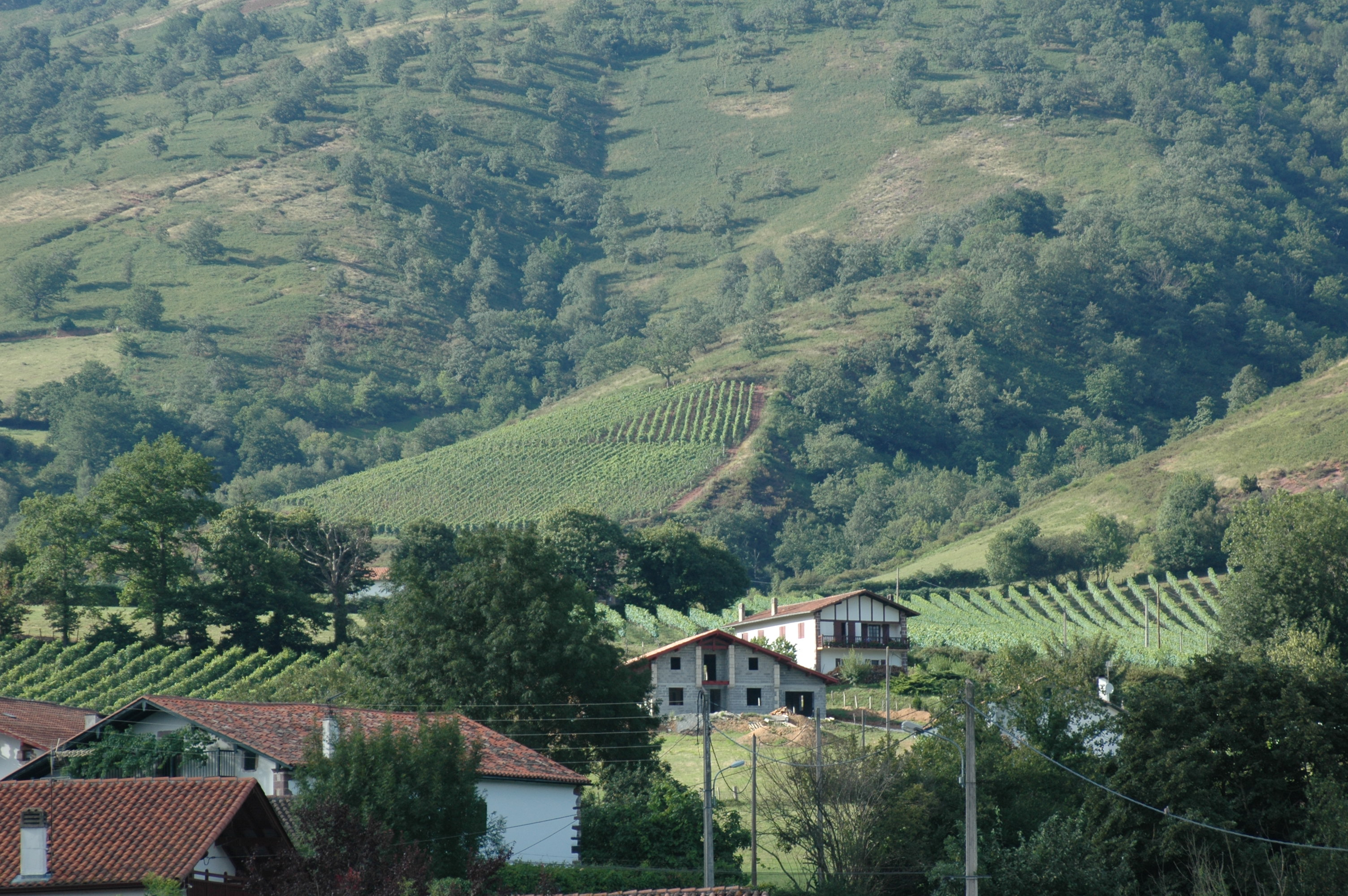
- Vineyards

- Coat of arms
- Location of Irouléguy
- Location within France Location within Nouvelle-Aquitaine
- Coordinates: 43°10′43″N 1°17′57″W
- Country: France
- Region: Nouvelle-Aquitaine
- Department: Pyrénées-Atlantiques
- Arrondissement: Bayonne
- Canton: Montagne Basque
- Intercommunality: CA Pays Basque

Government
  - Mayor (2020–2026): Joseph Mocho
- Area^{1}: 9.38 km^{2} (3.62 sq mi)
- Elevation: 223 m (732 ft)
- Highest elevation: 810 m (2,660 ft)
- Lowest elevation: 166 m (545 ft)
- Population (2023): 364
  - Density: 38.8/km^{2} (101/sq mi)
- Time zone: UTC+01:00 (CET)
  - Summer (DST): UTC+02:00 (CEST)
- INSEE/Postal code: 64274 /64220
- ^{1} French Land Register data, which excludes lakes, ponds, glaciers > 1 km^{2} (0.386 sq mi or 247 acres) and river estuaries.

Irouléguy (French pronunciation: [iʁuleɡi]; Basque: Irulegi) is a commune in the Pyrénées-Atlantiques department in south-western France.

It is located in the former province of Lower Navarre. It is mainly known for the Irouléguy AOC wine which is grown on the vineyards of the area.

== See also ==
- Communes of the Pyrénées-Atlantiques department
