= Saint-Étienne-de-Baïgorry =

Saint-Étienne-de-Baïgorry Baigorri (Basque)
- Commune
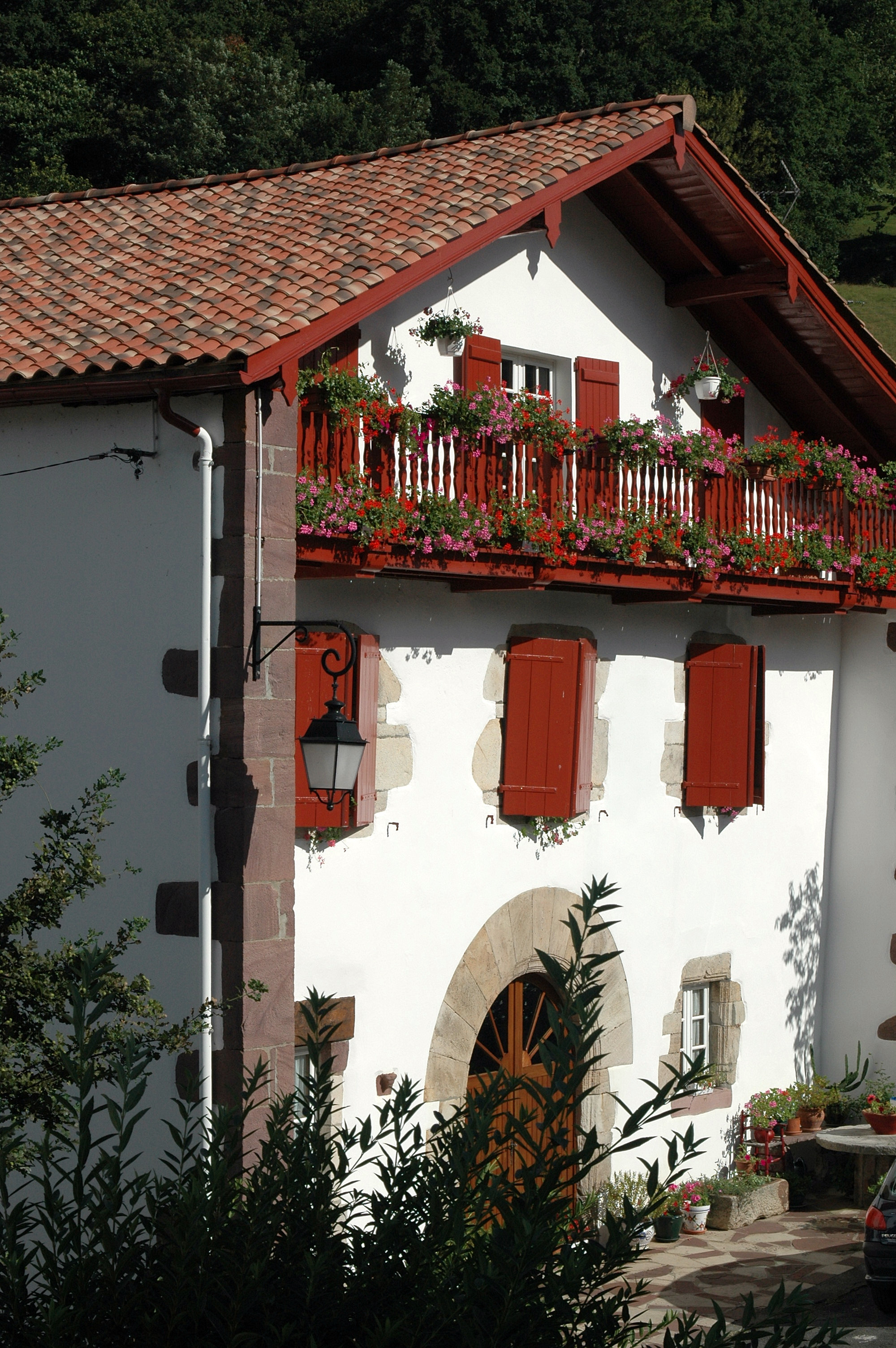
- A baserri in Saint-Étienne-de-Baïgorry
- Location of Saint-Étienne-de-Baïgorry
- Location within France Location within Nouvelle-Aquitaine
- Coordinates: 43°10′02″N 1°20′43″W
- Country: France
- Region: Nouvelle-Aquitaine
- Department: Pyrénées-Atlantiques
- Arrondissement: Bayonne
- Canton: Montagne Basque
- Intercommunality: CA Pays Basque

Government
  - Mayor (2023–2026): Antton Curutcharry
- Area^{1}: 69 km^{2} (27 sq mi)
- Elevation: 273 m (896 ft)
- Highest elevation: 1,049 m (3,442 ft)
- Lowest elevation: 146 m (479 ft)
- Population (2023): 1,527
  - Density: 22/km^{2} (57/sq mi)
- Time zone: UTC+01:00 (CET)
  - Summer (DST): UTC+02:00 (CEST)
- INSEE/Postal code: 64477 /64430
- ^{1} French Land Register data, which excludes lakes, ponds, glaciers > 1 km^{2} (0.386 sq mi or 247 acres) and river estuaries.

Saint-Étienne-de-Baïgorry (French pronunciation: [sɛ̃.t‿etjɛn də ba.iɡɔʁi]; Occitan: Sant Estève de Baigorri; Basque: Baigorri) is a commune in the Pyrénées-Atlantiques department in south-western France, belonging to the communauté d'agglomération du Pays Basque ("Consortium of communes of the Basque Country"). It is part of the former province of Lower Navarre. To the west, it borders the Spanish municipality of Baztan, which is accessed via the Izpegi Pass.

It is the main access to the Aldudes valley, having nearby the Castle, Château d'Etchaux, the river through the place being known as the river Nive des Aldudes.

The town is home to the renowned Day of Navarre (Basque: Nafarroa Eguna), a festival attracting a massive turnout (by thousands) from the Spanish and French side of Navarre in early May intended to strengthen ties between both Navarrese territories and affirming their common Basque identity.

== Canton ==
Cantons of Pyrénées-Atlantiques before 2015

Communes of the canton of Saint-Étienne-de-Baïgorry before 2015

Saint-Étienne-de-Baïgorry was the chief town of the former canton of Saint-Étienne-de-Baïgorry. Its 11 communes had some 5,727 inhabitants on some 311 km^{2} in 2006, with decreasing population. In 2015, the canton was merged into the new canton of Montagne Basque.

== Demography ==
Historical population
Year	Pop.	±% p.a.
1968	2,022	—
1975	1,783	−1.78%
1982	1,691	−0.75%
1990	1,565	−0.96%
1999	1,525	−0.29%
2007	1,607	+0.66%
2012	1,601	−0.07%
2017	1,477	−1.60%
2023	1,527	+0.56%
Source: INSEE

== Transportation ==
Set in a mountainous area, Baigorri is communicated by departmental roads D15 and D948, with a coach line offering service to Ossès (Basque Ortzaize) within TER Aquitaine's network.

The Area as a part of the French GR10, French footpaths,(Grand Randonnée 10)

== Main sights ==
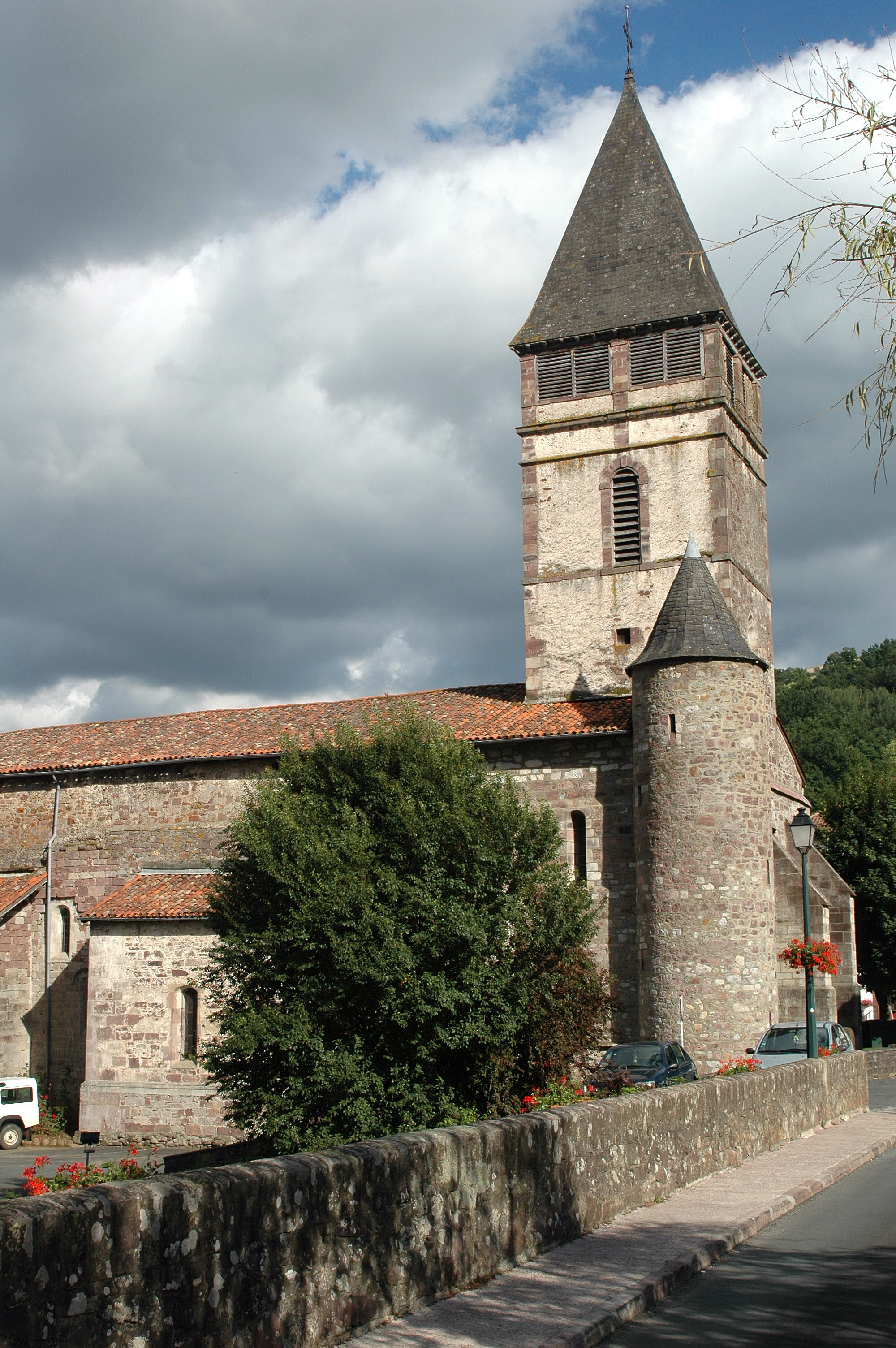
Saint Etienne Church

- Saint-Etienne church, in a Viscounty created in 1033 by King Sancho III of Navarre, is mentioned in documents of 1253, but with a Baroque retable of the 17th century displaying the stoning of 1st century AD Saint Étienne
- Château d'Etchaux, built in the 16th century by Viscount of Baïgorry

== Coat of arms ==

The meaning in Basque is the “red bank of the river”, in this case the river Nive, flowing through Bayonne and discharging the waters in the 324 km long Adour River.

== Notable people ==
- Jean Isidore Harispe, 1st Comte Harispe, (Saint-Étienne-de-Baïgorry, 7 December 1768 - Lacarre, 26 May 1855), was a distinguished French soldier of the Revolutionary and Napoleonic Wars, as well as of the following period. Harispe was created a Marshal of France in 1851.
- Jean-Baptiste Etcheverry, general councillor of Basses-Pyrénées and deputy of the Second French Empire, was born in Saint-Étienne-de-Baïgorry in 1805.

== See also ==
- Communes of the Pyrénées-Atlantiques department
- Baïgorry Valley
