= Baïgorry Valley =

Valley in French Basque Country

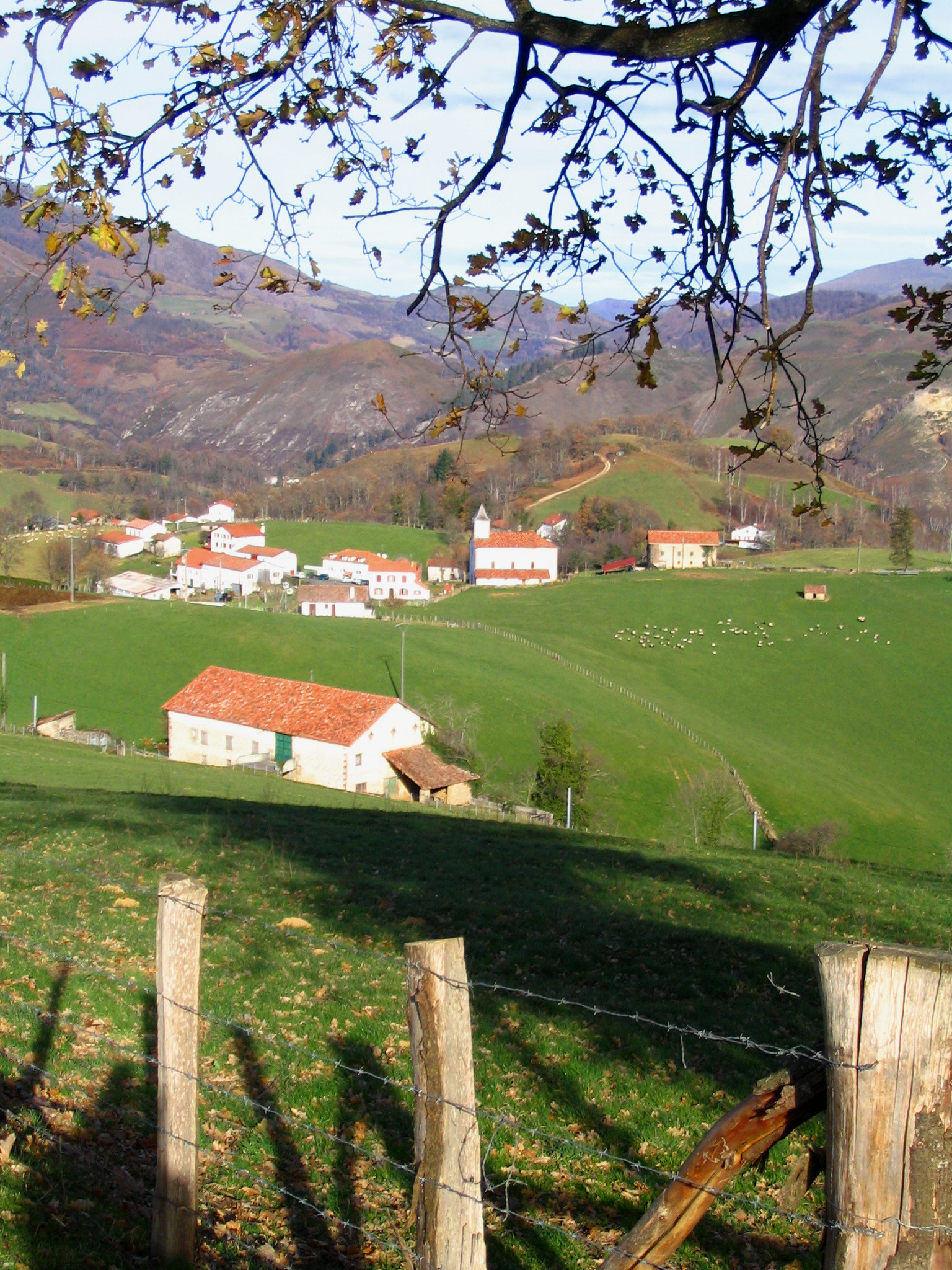
- The Baïgorry Valley (Esnazu village)
- Long-axis direction: northeast

Geography
- Location: Pyrénées
- Country: France
- State/Province: Nouvelle-Aquitaine
- District: Pyrénées-Atlantiques
- Population center: Aldudes, Anhaux, Ascarat, Banca, Irouléguy, Lasse, Saint-Étienne-de-Baïgorry, Urepel
- Coordinates: 43.125°N 1.385°W
- River: Nive des Aldudes, Nive d'Arnéguy
- Interactive map of Baïgorry Valley

The Baïgorry Valley is a valley in the Pyrenees through which flows the Nive des Aldudes, a tributary of the Nive River.

== Geography ==
=== Location ===
The Baïgorry Valley, near the Spanish border.

The modern definition of the Baïgorry Valley refers to a region within the French Basque Country, located in the Pyrénées-Atlantiques department of the Nouvelle-Aquitaine region, adjacent to the border with Spain (specifically the Navarrese Community). It corresponds to the present-day Canton of Saint-Étienne-de-Baïgorry, excluding the Ossès area, which includes the communes of Ossès, Bidarray, and Saint-Martin-d'Arrossa. To the east, the valley is bounded by the Nive d'Arnéguy and abuts the Pays de Cize. It extends southward into the Pays Quint (known as Kintoa in Basque or Quinto Real in Spanish), reaching into the Navarrese Erro Valley. Historically, during the Middle Ages, the term "Baïgorry Valley" encompassed a broader area than it does today, stretching further south into Spanish territory.

Eight communes are currently situated within the valley: Aldudes, Anhaux, Ascarat, Banca, Irouléguy, Lasse, Saint-Étienne-de-Baïgorry, and Urepel.

=== Topography and geology ===
==== Aldudes massif ====
The Baïgorry Valley lies within an ancient massif composed of Paleozoic rocks dating from 550 to 250 million years ago. The Aldudes Massif features mountains with uniform summit ridges, dominated by the 1,570-meter (5,150 ft) peak of Orzanzourièta. Many peaks exceed 1,000 meters (3,280 ft), supporting a traditional pastoral lifestyle with summer grazing (estivage) in the valleys of Aldudes, Baztan, Erro, and Valcarlos. Two-thirds of the peaks southeast of the line from Ardaza to Samoa—totaling 23 summits—range between 1,180 and 1,285 meters (3,871–4,216 ft), with 14 concentrated between 1,220 and 1,260 meters (4,003–4,134 ft).

The southern boundary of this Paleozoic block aligns with the latitude of Roncevaux. To the northwest, the watershed dividing the Nive and Bidassoa river basins follows the crest of a Permian-Triassic cuesta in the Baztan region, formed of pink sandstone. This geological structure continues northward to the Col d'Ispéguy, where primary rock outcrops narrow until reaching the Cize-Baïgorry tectonic depression. The massif terminates to the north at this point, overlooking an 11-kilometer (6.8 mi) stretch eastward to Saint-Michel, with a steep escarpment of 700 to 900 meters (2,297–2,953 ft) above the Cize depression. This depression, between the Col d’Oustéléguy and Irouléguy toward Saint-Jean-Pied-de-Port, features low altitudes—never exceeding 300 meters (984 ft), with valley floors averaging 150 meters (492 ft)—and a mild climate, sheltered by the southern mountain range and northern hills. Its limestone subsoil has supported viticulture.

The eastern edge of the massif is marked by a sharp Cenomanian break at the Ourkouloua cuesta, with a less defined boundary near Estérençuby. Eastern rocks from the Devonian period include oily schists, friable quartzitic sandstones, and massive or griotte-bearing limestones. The Aldudes Massif forms an asymmetrical, uplifted Paleozoic block, overlooking its sedimentary cover to the north and south, while being overshadowed by it to the west and east.

==== Baïgorry Valley ====
The massif’s oldest layers, from the Ordovician, consist of black schists, quartzophyllades, and hard, crystalline-cemented quartzite conglomerates in white or gray hues, forming thick beds ranging from 20 centimeters to several meters. These rocks create the steep escarpments of Aintziaga, Harrihandia, and Larrarte above Urdos. The Ispéguy valley features rocky outcrops of primary rock within black schists. Where schists dominate, the landscape softens into more regular profiles, contrasting rounded forms—like Mount Oylarandoy or the Hayra Valley—with sharp rocky fronts, such as the quartzite gorges of Valcarlos or the Munhoa-Artainbarria cliffs. Overlying Ordovician layers are softer Silurian black schists, which have eroded to form notches at several current passes.

In the south, the Aldudes basin results from the erosion of soft schists and occasionally dolomitic limestones. A significant deposit of pure magnesium carbonate-rich limestone spans the Pays Quint and Aldudes Valley but remains unexploited as of the early 21st century. These limestones feature dolines and sinkholes carved by rainwater and runoff, notably near Esnazu and the pastures of Pays Quint, often covered by thick grass or trees. Such formations are also visible on the slopes of Adarza (1,250 m or 4,101 ft) and Mendimotcha, where sinkholes like Ohakoa have formed above Banca.

The eastern valley features straight-sided hills separated by valleys with friable sandstone subsoils and outcrops, rapidly eroded by rain and frost, observable at the Aldudes sand quarry and Bihurrietabuztan ravines. In contrast, the western valley saw red sandstones deposited in the early Mesozoic (circa 225 million years ago) after the folding of the primary bedrock. This thick layer rims the Aldudes Massif, dipping toward Baztan and rising near the Nive Valley, forming a steep escarpment from Bidarray to the Col d’Ispéguy, peaking at Hautza (1,306 m or 4,285 ft) just 400 meters (1,312 ft) from the Spanish border. These red sandstones, also found along the Larla (700 m or 2,297 ft) and Yarra (812 m or 2,664 ft) ridges interrupted by the Nive gorge below Eyheralde, are quarried under the misnomer "La Rhune slabs." (Note: The La Rhune massif, 12 km long and 6 km wide, stretches from the Col de Saint-Ignace (179 m or 587 ft) to the Col de Lizuniaga (210 m or 689 ft) north-to-south, and from the Sare basin (74 m or 243 ft) to the Col d’Inzola (270 m or 886 ft) east-to-west.)

==== Peaks ====
The Adartza (1,250 m or 4,101 ft) lies between Saint-Étienne-de-Baïgorry, Lasse, and Anhaux. Artzaïnharria reaches 971 m (3,186 ft), while Arrolakoharria, between Banca, Saint-Étienne-de-Baïgorry, and Anhaux, stands at 1,060 m (3,478 ft). The Munhoa (1,021 m or 3,350 ft) is located between Saint-Étienne-de-Baïgorry and Saint-Jean-Pied-de-Port, accessible via the GR10 trail from Anhaux, Lasse, or Saint-Étienne-de-Baïgorry. Other summits include Harrigorry (806 m or 2,644 ft), Munhogain (853 m or 2,799 ft), Otsamunho (901 m or 2,956 ft), Errola (908 m or 2,979 ft), Abraku (1,003 m or 3,291 ft), Ichtauz (1,024 m or 3,360 ft), Antchola (1,119 m or 3,671 ft), Mehatzé (1,209 m or 3,967 ft), Lindus (1,220 m or 4,003 ft), Mendimotcha (1,224 m or 4,016 ft), and Aurigna (1,278 m or 4,193 ft). Border peaks include Ahintziaga (905 m or 2,969 ft) and Hautza (1,306 m or 4,285 ft), both west of Saint-Étienne-de-Baïgorry, and Adi (1,450 m or 4,757 ft) between Saint-Étienne-de-Baïgorry and Urepel.

==== Geological composition ====
The valley’s geognosy, particularly its mineral and metal deposits, has attracted human interest since antiquity, leading to early exploitation. A key copper deposit lies near Donostey, above Saint-Étienne-de-Baïgorry, within quartz-rich schists. The Ustelleguy mountain features a spathic iron vein on its western slope of red sandstone, trending north-south, with traces of pyritic copper. Numerous baryte veins, yellowish-white and often pure, sometimes mixed with blue and green copper carbonate and iron ochre, occur in the Haussa, Ustelleguy, Jara, and Borchirietta mountains amid red or schistose sandstone beds.

Pink or red sandstones abound along the watershed between the Aldudes and Baztan valleys, overlaying clayey schists in areas like Harrieta, Haussa, Ispeguy, Boustancellay, and Harrigorry, often forming puddingstone with large eroded fragments. The Haitzalde caves, carved by runoff over hundreds of meters in limestone, complement a subsoil of variegated clays—once used by tilemakers near Licerasse—and ophite deposits, likely from submarine volcanic activity 200 million years ago. Exploited sites, like the now-closed Saint-Étienne-de-Baïgorry quarry and the recently reopened Eyeralde quarry, provide ballast and marine riprap for the Basque Coast at Anglet. Weathered ophite yields calcium- and potassium-rich sands, while some veins contain pale green prehnite, noted near Casten erreka ("chestnut stream").

==== Mining deposits ====
Situated in a region with a rich mining and metallurgical history, the Baïgorry Valley lies along a northwest-southeast axis of copper, iron, silver, and gold deposits, stretching from the Baztan Valley through Baïgorry and Valcarlos to the Aezkoa Valley. Outcrops range from Carboniferous in the northwest to Devonian and Permian in the southeast, overlaid by thick Permo-Triassic pink sandstones. Most deposits align with their encasing geological periods: Ordovician schists and quartzites consistently bear iron (hematite, siderite) and copper (chalcopyrite), occasionally with silver-bearing gray copper; Devonian formations yield iron in breccia with hematite cement or oolitic forms, and sulfides like sphalerite, pyrite, galena, and chalcopyrite, with cinnabar in Aezkoa. Gold mining thrived on Baztan’s northern slope until World War II, while silver was extracted at Banca.

=== Hydrology ===
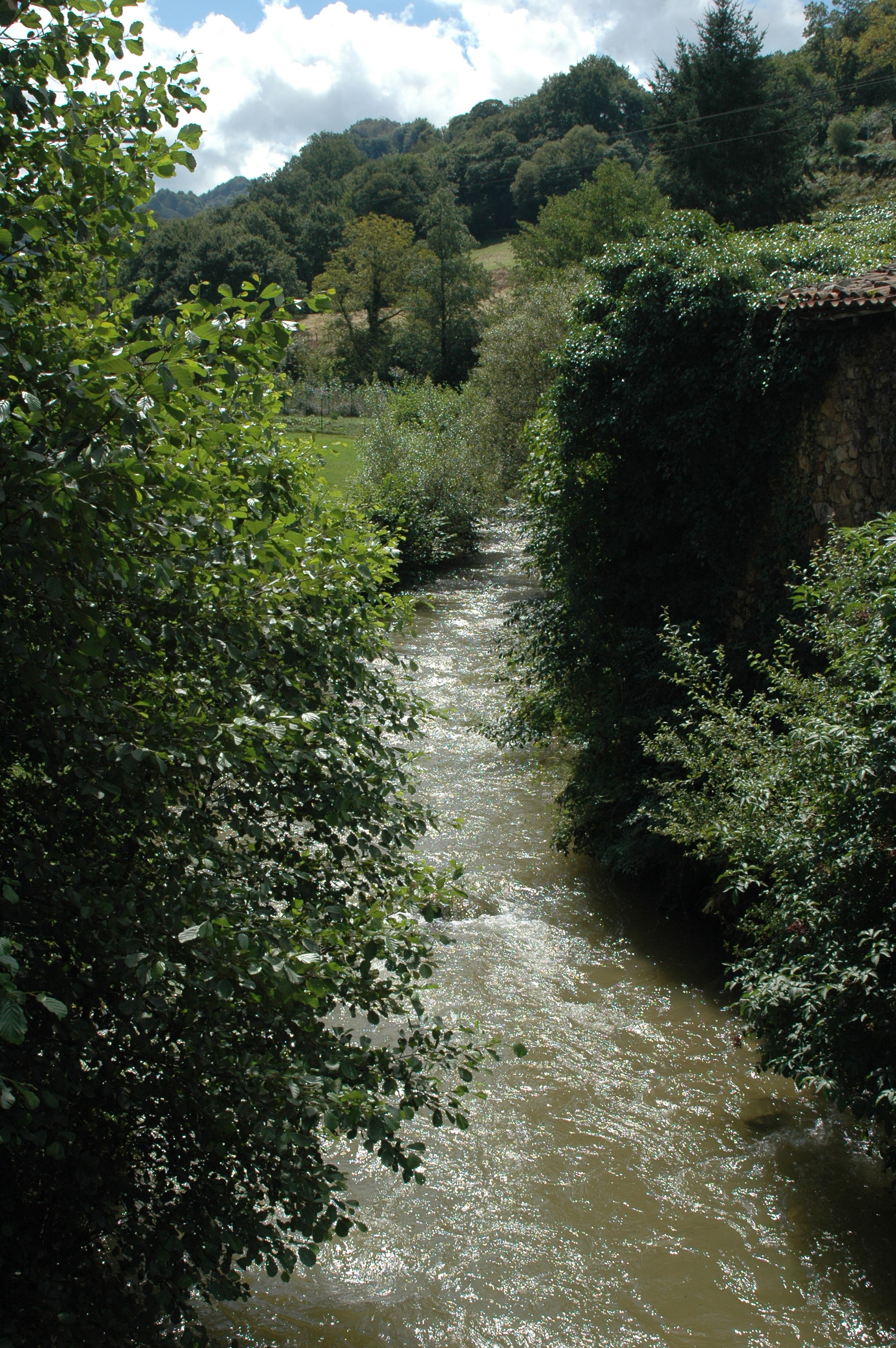
The Nive des Aldudes at Urepel.

The Aldudes Massif, nestled within the drainage basin of the Adour, channels its waters almost entirely northeast, feeding two tributaries of the Nive: the Nive d'Arnéguy and the Nive des Aldudes. These streams originate in the massif, approximately 1,600 meters (5,250 ft) and 800 meters (2,625 ft) from the southern edge of the primary Paleozoic block. They flow within an ancient basin-shaped by inverted relief, exposing a flattened, eroded core of older rock beneath a sedimentary periclinal cover.

The Nive des Aldudes—dubbed "the great stream of Baygorri" in 1675—alongside the Hayra stream, courses westward, initially flowing north-northwest toward the syncline basin of Maya. It then skirts the eastern edge of this basin northward, heading toward the tectonic depression of Cize-Baïgorry. Between Aldudes and Banca, the river cuts through the Permo-Triassic Bearzun syncline via fractures in the terrain, joined by the Harchouri and Orizon streams, which emerge from valleys curving eastward. A tributary from Hostatégui Peak carves a 3-kilometer (1.9-mi) channel, towering 10 to 40 meters (33–131 ft) above the Orizon stream. The Nive des Aldudes gathers numerous tributaries across the valley, including the Oholbidéko erreka, flowing through Anhaux and Lasse, and the Hairako erreka and Bihuntzeguiko erreka, watering Banca. Saint-Étienne-de-Baïgorry, meanwhile, is crisscrossed by the Guermiette and Urdos streams and the Nekaitzeko, Abrakako, and Bihuntzeguiko errekas. The Nive des Aldudes and most of its tributaries—excluding the Bihunseguiko Erreka, Imilztegiko Erreka, Urbeltch, and Belechiro Erreka—are classified to protect or restore ecological continuity, banning new structures that obstruct this flow.

To the east, the Nive d'Arnéguy—or "Aïri"—also flows toward the Cize depression.

=== Climate ===
The valley’s climate blends Atlantic influences from the west with the effects of the towering massif it backs onto, often exceeding 1,000 meters (3,280 ft) in elevation. The nearest weather station, Biarritz-Anglet, lies less than 40 kilometers (25 mi) away as the crow flies, (Note: The orthodromic distance between Saint-Étienne-de-Baïgorry and Biarritz is detailed at Delvarre, Lionel. "Orthodromie entre Saint-Étienne-de-Baïgorry et Biarritz" [Orthodromy between Saint-Étienne-de-Baïgorry and Biarritz]. Lion 1906 (in French). Archived from the original on September 18, 2016..) offering a reliable baseline despite variations due to the valley’s proximity to rugged terrain and relative distance from the Atlantic coast, impacting rainfall, sunlight, and temperature swings.

High rainfall defines the valley. At Banca’s weather station, perched at 254 meters (833 ft), annual precipitation averaged 2,027 millimeters (80 in) from 1976 to 1985, peaking at 2,500 millimeters (98 in) in 1979. Nestled against the peaks, Banca sees far more rain than Irouléguy to the north. (Note: From October 10 to November 6, 1976—a 26-day stretch with only two dry days—Banca recorded 542 millimeters (21 in) of rain.) Data from 1971 to 1990 show Banca averaging 150 rainy days annually. The wet season spans roughly six months, easing into a four-month summer respite with monthly averages around 100 millimeters (4 in)—half the rainy season’s totals.

Snowfall is scarce, with occasional peaks above 1,000 meters (3,280 ft) during winter, leaving some white cornices. Frosts are equally rare: 1985 saw 51 freeze days, while 1982 had just 11, averaging about 30 days below 0 °C (32 °F) yearly. Temperature disparities emerge between valleys—where Banca hit −12.6 °C (9 °F) in January 1985—and frost-trapping hollows, like Irouléguy’s −15.4 °C (4 °F) that month. These extremes are outliers; January typically averages 7 °C (45 °F).

Summers are warm, with July and August averaging 19–20 °C (66–68 °F), occasionally soaring above 35 °C (95 °F)—Banca hit 39.2 °C (102.6 °F) in 1982. From September to December, the southerly haize hegoa wind clears skies, pushing temperatures past 20 °C (68 °F)—Irouléguy recorded 33 °C (91 °F) in October 1985 and 26 °C (79 °F) that December.

=== Transportation and communication routes ===
==== The former railway ====
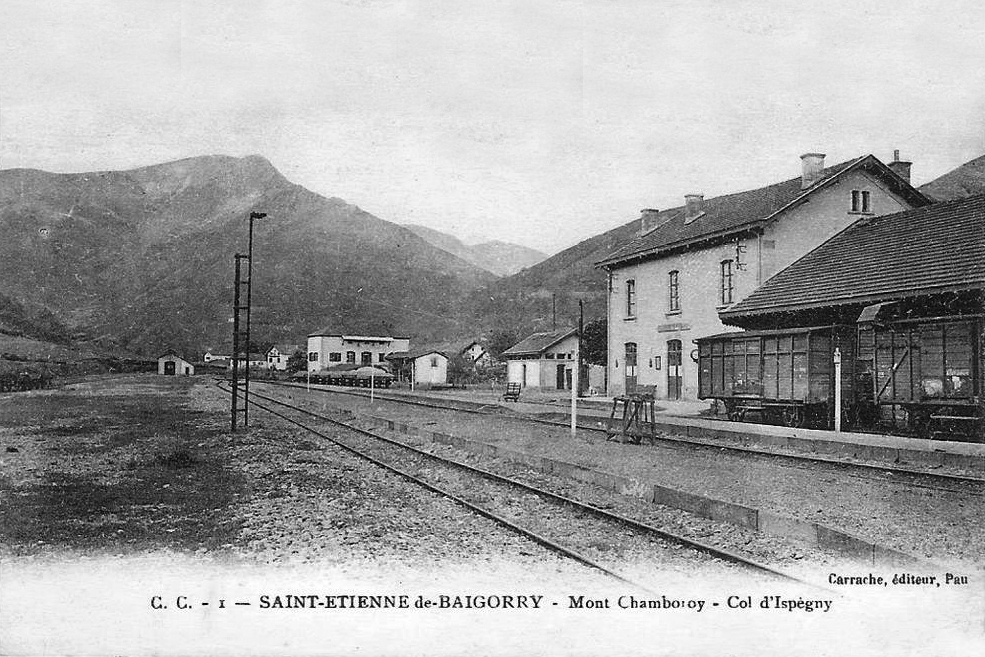
Saint-Étienne-de-Baïgorry station.

In August 1878, as part of regional connectivity studies spurred by Public Works Minister Charles de Freycinet, the departmental council endorsed a rail line from Bayonne to Saint-Jean-Pied-de-Port, with a branch from Ossès to Aldudes. This extension was bolstered by prospects of an international line to Pamplona. Declared a public utility on July 17, 1879, the line—officially “Bayonne to Saint-Jean-Pied-de-Port, with a branch from Ossès to Saint-Étienne-de-Baïgorry”—was concessioned to the Compagnie des chemins de fer du Midi et du Canal latéral à la Garonne (Midi Railway Company and the Garonne Lateral Canal) via an agreement ratified on November 20, 1878 (likely a typo for 1878 in the original). The Ossès to Saint-Étienne-de-Baïgorry segment opened on June 26, 1898. Early plans for a Spanish extension faltered due to the steep costs of climbing to 890 meters (2,920 ft) at Urquiaga Pass and tunneling through the Quinto Real massif to the Arga valley, though the Baïgorry copper mines justified the branch’s completion. Tracing the Nive des Aldudes, which it crosses, the line served stations at Eyheralde, Borciriette, and terminated at Saint-Étienne-de-Baïgorry station. It ceased operations on February 6, 2014.

==== Road network ====
The Aldudes Massif valleys, carved by gorges, feature roads hewn into rock along the Nive rivers of Arnéguy and Aldudes. Not until the late 18th century did valley-bottom municipalities commit to maintaining passable roads, a costly endeavor. The Hayra valley, for instance, awaited a viable path until 1950, despite homes stretching across six of its twelve kilometers (3.7 of 7.5 mi) by then.

Access from France comes via Saint-Étienne-de-Baïgorry and the Nive valley along the D 948 from Bayonne. Before its 17th-century opening through Ossès, connections ran via the Cize region. From Spain, the NA 138 links the valley to Pamplona via Urkiaga Pass (“place of birches”), joining the N135 at Zubiri in the Navarre Foral Community. The Izpegi Pass, at 672 meters (2,205 ft) beneath the 1,305-meter (4,281-ft) Auza Peak, offers another route to Spain’s Baztan valley via the D 249, extending as the NA 2600 toward Elizondo.

==== Pilgrimage and hiking trails ====
While valley floors long challenged vehicular travel, ridge paths abound. The Roncevaux Pass route, part of the Camino Navarro on the Way of St. James pilgrimage, stretches from Saint-Jean-Pied-de-Port through Mezquiriz and Erro passes. Pilgrims to Pamplona can alternatively traverse the Aldudes valley, crossing the Pyrenees at Urquiaga Pass. Beyond the narrow valley, the Pays Quint plain unfurls, flanked by low mountains, with only Urquiaga Pass to the south before Navarre.

Saint-Étienne-de-Baïgorry lies on the GR 10 trail, spanning the Pyrenees west to east. It’s the starting point for a trek along the Iparla ridges to Bidarray, straddling the Spanish border.

== Urbanism ==
=== Morphological evolution ===
Settlement in the Baïgorry Valley began with the establishment of hamlets in the northern, lower reaches of the valley. By 1381, the village of Saint-Étienne encompassed eleven parishes: Leizparz (or Leispars), Urdos, La Bastide, Othikoren (or Otticoren), Okoz (or Occos), Germieta (or Guermiette), Anhaux, Irouléguy, Sorhoeta (or Sorhouette), Ascarat, and Lasse. The latter extended westward to the locales of Jauregi and Uhaldea. Additional hamlets dotted the area, including Bursoritz between Irouléguy and Sorhoeta, and Lizarazu, Eyheralde, Arambide, Bidaurre, and Iribarne east of La Bastide and Urdos. Etxauz and Aphararen flanked Saint-Étienne to the north and south, respectively. (Today, Anhaux, Ascarat, Irouléguy, and Lasse are independent communes, while the districts of Eyheralde, Germieta, Okoz, and Urdos retain their places of worship.) During the Middle Ages, Anhaux’s Xuritua quarter housed a majority of Cagots, primarily weavers. (Note: As of the 21st century, Anhaux preserves medieval houses such as Bereterretxea, Bidartea, Etxekoina, Etxebertzea, Espila, Eyherartea, Irigoyena, Minondoa, and Uhaldea.) By the late 15th century, approximately 280 homes were concentrated in the north, not extending beyond the Saint-Étienne quarter.

Population growth in the 17th and 18th centuries, driven by younger siblings settling in the valley’s southern reaches, led to the construction of shepherd huts on previously uninhabited land. This expansion birthed the villages of Banca, Urepel, and Aldudes. Large buildings from this period often bear their original owners’ names, suffixed with enea (“belonging to”).

The village of Aldudes, in the valley’s south, was historically part of the Pays Quint, under the jurisdiction of the Erro Valley as late as 1773. (Note: The village’s main house bears the inscription Esta casa es de bal d’Erro 1773 (“This house belongs to the Erro Valley 1773”).) Despite building prohibitions, 10 cabins existed there in the 13th century, growing to 70 by the 17th century. Its church was erected in 1688, and the treaties of 1785 and 1856, acknowledging the established presence, recognized the parish. Urepel, north of the Pays Quint opening, separated from Aldudes in 1865 to become an independent commune.

=== Architecture ===
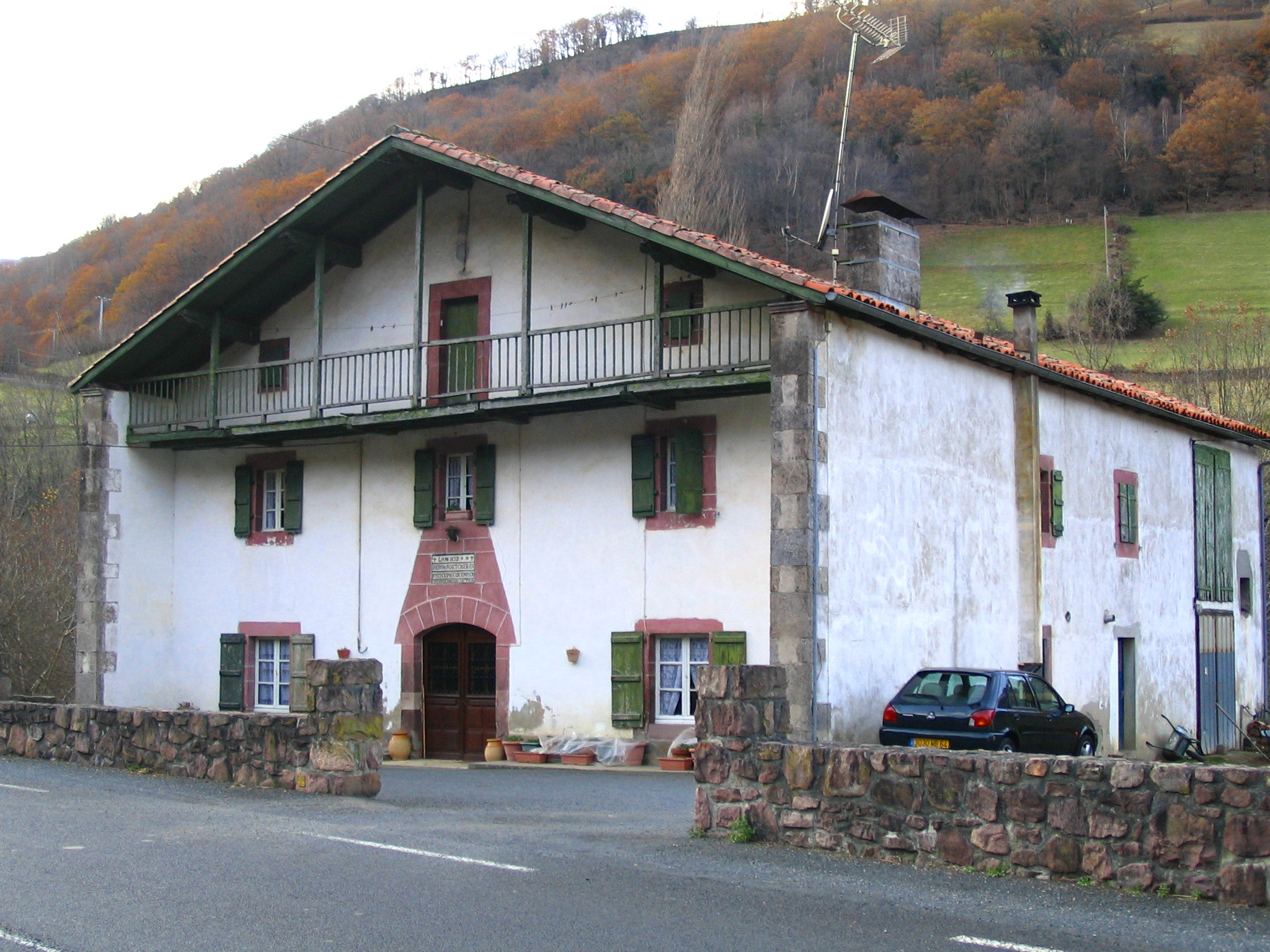
The Gastigarria house in Banca.

The traditional agricultural houses of the Baïgorry Valley reflect adaptations to the local climate and the agro-pastoral lifestyle dominant before World War II, prior to the mechanization of farming. These Lower Navarrese-style homes feature two gable walls supporting a double-pitched roof. Typically, their facades are coated with white stucco and accented by an arched ochre sandstone doorway. A balcony, supported by floor joists between the lateral load-bearing walls, extends above the first floor, serving the purpose of drying seeds like maize, flax, hemp, or chili peppers for planting.

The ground floor opens into the ezkaratze, a high-ceilinged central workspace that leads to the living quarters. It also houses the stable, cellar, laundry, and cart shed, while the upper floor typically serves as a granary.

=== Natural and technological risks ===
The valley is not covered by any Water management and development plan (SAGE). (Note: See the environmental reports issued per commune by the Aquitaine General Council.) In 2014, 11 classified facilities for environmental protection were recorded in Aldudes, primarily related to fish farming. Similarly, Anhaux, Ascarat, Banca, Irouléguy, Lasse, Saint-Étienne-de-Baïgorry, and Urepel each reported 11 classified facilities, mainly tied to quarrying or river resource exploitation.

Natural hazards, including floods, wildfires, and storms, are noted in the valley per the departmental major risk dossier. Banca faces an additional risk of underground quarry collapse. Seismic risk is moderate, rated at 4 on a 1-to-5 scale. Recently, five natural disaster declarations have been issued for valley communes due to flooding and wave-induced mechanical shocks (two decrees), flooding and mudslides (two decrees), and a storm (one decree).

== Toponymy ==
Successive attested forms of the toponym Aldudes.
- alduide, 1193;
- montes de alduides, 1237
- aldude, 1353;
- alduyde, 1374;, 1381 and 1392
- alduide, 1674 titles of the Camara de Comptos
- Aldudes, 1793
- Les Aldudes, 1863.

The term vallée in Vallée de Baïgorry first appears in 980, alongside references to the Arberoue, Ossès, and Cize valleys, consecrated by Bishop Arsius Raca as vallis que dicitur Bigur. It denoted both a mountainous geographic area and an administrative territory of the Church. By the late 10th century, the valley fell under the diocese of Lapurdum-Bayonne, encompassing all or part of what would become Lower Navarre. In 1350, its eleven original hamlets, spanning from Cize to Uhart-Cize, housed nearly 300 homes, 49 of which belonged to infançones (petty nobility). (Note: Infançons could hold vassals, as per the rule: “Any infançon with free property who wishes to maintain villeins or taxpayers (i.e., those yielding rent or produce) shall have the same rights over them as the king and great lords have over theirs.”) The term infançon appears as enfençon in the 13th century; from the 16th century, French historians, prioritizing lineage over land ownership, reclassified infançons as non-noble. In the Baïgorry Valley, 17th- and 18th-century house lintels preserve the identities of infançon owners, such as Aintziondo in Ascarat, Sorzabalbehere in Saint-Étienne, and the former Iriberrigarai, inscribed with “Infançonne je suis née, infançonne je mourrai” (“Born an infançonne, I shall die an infançonne”).

Baïgorry (or Baigorri in vernacular Basque), derived from Old Basque bai (“river, watercourse”) and gorri (“red”), is not unique in the Basque Country. A village near Estella in Navarre and a house in Montory in Soule share the name. The form Baicor(r)ix appears in at least three votive inscriptions from the Upper Comminges before the 5th century. Alongside the 980 spelling bigur, 14th- and 15th-century Gallo-Roman texts record baigor, beigur, and Baiguer, while the original name emerged in 1238 as santi stephani de baigorrie. The modern “y” is a “remnant of medieval spelling.” Before its 980 administrative designations, Baïgorry likely referred solely to the Nive d’Urepel valley. Local architecture, both traditional and modern, frequently incorporates the valley’s reddish sandstones, visible in its subsoil and waterways.

Though the Aldudes parish formed in the 17th century, its toponym dates to at least the late 12th century, describing the mountainous slopes of the upper Nive des Aldudes valley near the Spanish border. The Basque form aldude persists in Navarrese records, while Romance languages add a plural marker by 1237 in Navarro-Castilian texts. Jean-Baptiste Orpustan suggests the Basque etymon ald(a)-uhide, meaning “slope of the water path.” Aldudes became a commune in 1793. Its Esnazu quarter, stretching toward Navarre and the Col d’Urquiaga, reflects a pastoral role due to its elevation, derived from Basque esne (“milk”) as a “place suited for milk production.”

From east to west, starting at the Pays de Cize, Ascarat (attested since 1106) is reached via a steep climb, its name blending Basque aitz (“rock”) and garate (“high place”). Lasse, named for the Basque hydronym latsa (“river”), tied to the Nive d’Arnéguy and its tributaries in the southeast, first appears as laatssa in 1266. Anhaux, known since 1068 as onodz, puzzles etymologists; Orpustan wavers between a Basque blend of hauz (“height”) and ahun (“goat”)—“height of goats”—or the Latin fanu(m) (“shrine”)—“height of a sacred place.”

Further west, Sorhoeta, one of the valley’s eleven original hamlets (now part of Irouléguy), appears as soroeta in 1350. Derived from Basque sor(h)o (“field, meadow”), borrowed from Latin solu(m) (“place of fields”), it reflects agricultural roots. Nearby, toward Irouléguy at the foot of Jara (811 m or 2,661 ft), modern Moussourits evolved from Bursoritz (burssoriz in 1350), combining buru (“limit”) and sor(h)o—“edge of cultivated lands”—hinting at settlement progression. Irouléguy, recorded as yrurleguj in 1264, likely merges hirur (“three”) and hegi (“ridge”), possibly nodding to the trio of overlooking peaks: Jara (north), Munhoa (1,021 m or 3,350 ft, south), and Oilarandoy (933 m or 3,061 ft, southwest). Guermiette (gueremieta in 1264), another medieval hamlet beneath Munhoa and Oilarandoy, has an uncertain etymology, debated among linguists. Occos (olcotz in 1249), a district on the watered slope above the Nive, may trace to a Gaulish root via Late and Medieval Latin, yielding French “ouche” (“enclosure, cultivated land, garden”) and Spanish huelga (“garden by a stream”).

Otikoren, on the Nive’s right bank among the original eleven hamlets, appears as hoticoren in 1350, an anthroponymic name meaning “belonging to Otiko,” unchanged since the Middle Ages. Northwest, at the gorge threshold between Larla and Iparla, Urdos (hurdos in 1350) sits on a plateau, its name from Aquitanian urd- (“elevated flat, plateau”), linked to a fortified house (jauregia). Leispars (layzparz in 1264), overlooking a Nive bend, denotes a noble house cluster, with a fortified house (lassale de lehitzpartz) noted in 1366 and about 15 tax hearths in medieval times; its etymology is muddled by Basque roots leiz- (“abyss”) and leizarr (“ash tree”).

In the south, Banca emerged in the 19th century after the decline of La fonderie (“The Foundry”), tied to mining and the 1747 smelter’s closure. It borrows from French “banc” (“bench”), referring to quarry rock ledges in Basque usage. Urepel, cited as johan durepel in 1279, derives from ure (“water”) and means “tepid water,” naming the Nive d’Urepel or d’Oureppe. An 1840 cadastral misreading of “La N. d’Urep” as “la Noureppe” persists on old maps.

== History ==
=== Prehistory ===
The Baïgorry Valley, one of four key passages through the western Pyrenees, was frequented as early as the Paleolithic period. Numerous megaliths and dolmens dot the landscape, evidencing prehistoric settlement. Natural pigments, like hematite and limonite used to adorn the Isturitz and Oxocelhaya caves during this era, were likely sourced from the Aldudes Valley.

Atop Ardaza, within the modern commune of Banca, stand two tunnel-shaped monuments with broken barrel vaults. These structures—3 meters (9.8 ft) high and 8 meters (26 ft) long—rest on the sites of two cromlechs. Their age and purpose remain undetermined.

=== Protohistory and Antiquity ===
Analysis of the Quinto Real peat bog in the Aldudes Valley has shed light on its ancient past. Lead pollution traces suggest metallurgical activity, while pollen records indicate a surge in pastoral practices between 1750 and 1500–1350 BCE, during the Middle Bronze Age.

The valley’s copper deposits appear to have been exploited by the Romans.

=== Middle Ages ===
The Baïgorry Valley weathered the upheavals of Lower Navarre’s formation, a term coined to distinguish it from peninsular Navarre. In medieval times, Lower Navarre was known as tierras de ultra-puertos or aillent puertos (“lands beyond the passes”), and from the 16th century as the sexto merindad (“sixth district”). This province emerged through annexations aimed at securing the Bayonne river basin. Between 1022 and 1120, under the influence of Sancho the Great, the Baïgorry region—alongside Cize, Ossès, Arberoue, and Irissarry—fell under Navarrese control, overlapping with parts of Labourd. Early in the 11th century, Sancho elevated the valley to a viscounty for an ally; until the French Revolution, 23 viscounts succeeded one another, later bearing the title Viscount of Etxauz.

From 1194, the Baïgorry region answered to the captain-castellan of Saint-Jean-Pied-de-Port, the Navarrese king’s ultra-puertos representative for administration, finance, (Note: “The rent collector centralized and recovered various taxes, royal domain revenues, and dues, while covering ordinary and extraordinary expenses.”) and military affairs. Civil and criminal jurisdiction initially fell to the Navarre Chancery. While no records detail the Baïgorry General Court’s operations, Eugène Goyheneche suggests it mirrored the Arberoue General Court, comprising twenty members led by the parish’s chief magistrate. Nobles could attend but not vote, while house masters (etxeko jaun) were required to participate. Eleven jurors, one from each parish, convened in Berrogain to draft the court’s agenda, which parish assemblies (biltzar) debated and voted on beforehand. Religiously, the valley belonged to the Bishopric of Bayonne, represented by the Cize archdeacon.

The “lineage wars” between Navarre and Gipuzkoa rippled into Lower Navarre. In 1258, an hermandad—a militia uniting forces from Cize, Baïgorry, Ossès, and Armendarits—formed. These hermandades or armandats, armed popular groups with police powers, operated under royal authority.

=== Early Modern Period ===
The valley’s strategic position between France and Spain made it a contested prize, with control of the Berdaritz Pass key to dominating this route.

From 1763, the valley’s push for Third Estate autonomy—stripping nobles of voting rights in parish assemblies—sparked conflict with the Viscounts of Echauz. Led by Marthe de Saint-Martin d’Etchaux, the viscounts sought to usurp the Baïgorry viscounty title and impose feudal dues. In 1771, she secured hunting and high justice rights from the king, later repurchased by the valley. In 1773, she demanded church precedence rights, leading to the conviction of four Baigorriar residents. By 1784, the Echauz viscounts challenged established hunting and arms privileges, but the Royal Council ruled in favor of the Baigorriar.

=== French Revolution and Empire ===
Louis XVI’s execution on January 21, 1793, heightened tensions between France and Spain. On March 7, the National Convention declared war on Charles IV. In early June 1793, Spanish forces seized the Baïgorry Valley, with General Ventura Caro establishing headquarters at Château-Pignon in Banca, despite resistance from four French free companies led by valley native Jean Isidore Harispe, alongside Iriart, Lassale-Cezeau, and Berindoaque. These units formed the core of the Army of the Western Pyrenees, officially constituted on April 30, 1793, under General Servan.

On June 3, 1794, a battalion of Basque chasseurs—free companies under Harispe, who assumed command after General Lavictoire’s fatal wounding—and General-in-Chief Muller reclaimed the valley. Defenders numbered either 300 émigrés from the Royal Pyrenees Legion, led by Lieutenant-General Marquis de Saint-Simon, or 300 “Aldudian chasseurs,” per differing accounts. On July 24, reorganized French forces, exploiting Spanish exhaustion, saw Moncey capture Baztan and Delaborde Seize Vera de Bidassoa, near the valley.

The Basque chasseurs’ effectiveness in this mobile, light infantry-driven conflict stemmed from fighting on familiar terrain. Initially volunteer units electing their leaders, they rallied around a Baigorriar core, channeling resentment against the Erro Valley over disputed Pays Quint pastures.

In 1856 and 1857, Napoleon III and Spain’s Isabella II negotiated the Treaty of Bayonne, redefining the Franco-Spanish border. Article 7 states: “At Pertolé, the [boundary] line will bend westward toward Mendimocha’s summit, then ascend southward along the ridges separating Valcarlos from the Baïgorry Valley to Lindus-balsacoa. From there, it reaches Lindusmunua, proceeds straight to Isterbeguy peak, then by another straight line to Beorbuzustan, continuing along the ridges to the Col d’Ispeguy.” This remains the local border definition today.

=== Contemporary Era ===
Mass emigration from the valley to the Americas marked the 19th century, persisting into the 1960s. This exodus depleted conscription pools, with the Baïgorry and Saint-Jean-Pied-de-Port cantons with big desertion rates. Authorities noted the Basques’ “high colonizing value.” (Note: Journal officiel de la République française, August 31, 1885.) For instance, Paul Laxalt’s mother, a key advisor to Ronald Reagan, hailed from Saint-Étienne-de-Baïgorry.

=== The Pays Quint – Middle Ages to Contemporary Era ===
The Pays Quint—known as Quint Royal, Kintoa, or Quinto Real after the Navarrese king’s livestock tax—was governed by a facerie between the Baïgorry Valley and the Erro, Valcarlos, and Baztan valleys. In the Middle Ages, this Navarrese territory stretched north to Saint-Étienne parish. Population growth in the 17th and 18th centuries drove younger siblings southward, intensified by Banca’s forge operations, shrinking shared forests and pastures. This sparked violent clashes with the Erro Valley.

The 1614 Arnéguy royal capitulations, building on earlier faceries, aimed to halt hostilities. Signed by French representatives under the Bishop of Bayonne and Spanish-Navarrese delegates, it set a provisional border, curbing conflicts over deforestation and pasture use while banning new land occupation.

Persistent tensions prompted the 1785 Treaty of Limits, or Elizondo Treaty, drafted by France’s François-Marie d’Ornano and Spain’s Ventura Caro after surveying the Aldudes-Valcarlos border. Signed on August 27, 1785, and effective January 1, 1786, it was ratified on March 21, 1786, at the Palacio del Pardo. (Note: The treaty of August 27, 1785, was signed in Elizondo by the royal representatives, Count d'Ornano for France and Ventura Caro for Spain. The agreement was ratified on March 21, 1786, at the Pardo Palace. It enshrines the division of the Aldudes “by establishing the dividing line which forever separates the valleys of Upper and Lower Navarre and the high and direct sovereignty of the two Majesties [...]” and abolishes faceries “harmful to peace” between border villages.) It redefined lies and passeries—rights granted by custom or agreement to neighboring landowners and shepherds—ceding Ondarole and its iron mine to Spain and granting Baïgorry ownership of Urepel, Esnazu, and parts of Banca and Aldudes. Protests from Cize (over Ondarole and Iraty Forest parcels) and Baigorriar (over prime pastures) led to abandoning contested terms. Ondarole remained French under Cize but joined the Bishopric of Pamplona.

Subsequent annexes in the 19th century refined the Treaty of Limits, notably the December 2, 1856, treaty, December 28, 1858, annex, and May 26, 1866, act. Article 15 of the 1856 treaty split the Aldudes’ slopes: Baïgorry gained “exclusive and perpetual enjoyment” of northern pastures for an annual 8,000-franc lease (adjusted to 344,000 francs for 1988–1990) and, for 15 years, shared southern summer pastures with Spain. (Note: The treaty precisely defines this area: “Bounded by a line starting at Beorzubustan, following the Pyrenees chain through the peaks of Urisburu, Urtiaga, Adi, Odia, Iterumburu, Sorogaina, Arcoleta, Berascoinzar, Curuchespila, Bustarcotemendia, and Lindusmunua, returning to Beorzubustan via Isterbegui.”)

== Politics and administration ==
=== The border ===
The Baïgorry Valley Syndical Commission was established by imperial decree in 1838. It oversees the undivided lands of the valley’s eight communes, spanning 10,000 hectares (25,000 acres), plus 2,500 hectares (6,200 acres) in the Navarrese valleys of Erro and Baztan, collectively known as the Pays Quint.

These “syndical” lands host transhumance for six months annually, supporting the herds of approximately 250 valley breeders. In the 2000s, this included nearly 50,000 sheep, 1,100 cattle, 350 goats, and 550 horses. The commission has spearheaded pastoral improvements, including installing watering troughs, clearing and enhancing land via controlled burning, and upgrading shepherds’ cabins to meet modern standards.

Alongside the Cize Syndical Commission and the Garazi-Baigorri Community of Communes, the Baïgorry Valley Syndical Commission joined the Lindux-Orreaga cross-border cooperation agreement, signed in Saint-Étienne-de-Baïgorry on July 21, 2005. (Note: The territory encompasses, on the Spanish side, the Baztan, Erro, Esteribar, Aezkoa, Auritz-Burguete, Roncevaux, and Luzaide-Valcarlos valleys.) This pact unites 15 municipalities from Spain’s Navarre Foral Community and 30 from France’s Pyrénées-Atlantiques department—all once part of the historic Kingdom of Navarre—to “promote cross-border intermunicipal cooperation.” Its scope includes local economies (agriculture, forestry, commerce, crafts, and tourism), cultural heritage (sports and language education), and natural heritage (environment, hunting, and fishing).

=== The Valley community ===
Since the late 1990s, the Association of Merchants, Farmers, and Artisans of the Aldudes Valley (ACVA)—now AIBA (Aldudeko Ibarra Beti Aintzina, “Aldudes Valley Always Moving Forward”)—has worked to foster “sustainable development” in the valley. To showcase its achievements and spark discussion, AIBA hosts biennial themed open-door events: “Aldudes 2030” in 2012, cross-border issues in 2014, and territorial attractiveness in 2016. Beyond these, AIBA focuses on two priorities: demographics and mobility. For the former, it conducted a vacant housing census and surveyed property ownership needs; for the latter, partnering with the General Commission for Territorial Equality (CGET) and the Centre for Studies and Expertise on Risks, Environment, Mobility, and Planning (Cerema), it assesses shared transport needs like carpooling or a shuttle service.

== Economy ==
=== Mining ===
Mining and metallurgical sites in the Baïgorry Valley date back to antiquity. A 1991 dating campaign, combined with Gilles Parent’s topographic survey of Banca’s mines and Pierre Machot’s archival research, provided a scientific overview of known sites. (Note: Earliest referenced mining records date to the 14th century. By the 18th and 19th centuries, four copper smelters and an equal number of blast furnace plants operated, two of which—Eugui and Orbaiceta, both with double blast furnaces in Spanish Navarre—produced armaments for the Spanish Crown.) While black powder traces confirm early modern exploitation, visual dating techniques—such as attributing gallery shapes to specific eras—proved unreliable. Oil lamp notches typify antiquity, but their absence isn’t conclusive. Similarly, evidence of fire-setting (Note: Before explosives, rock was split by heating it with fires set against walls. Some near summits were later reworked as quarries in modern times.) or chisel use spans multiple periods, persisting long after explosives entered mining.

The valley has about twenty documented mining sites, many exploited since antiquity.

==== Antiquity ====
The Ustelegi mining and metallurgical site in Saint-Étienne-de-Baïgorry supplied ore to the Etchauz forge from the mid-17th century to the 1780s, the Banca blast furnace in the early 19th century, and again from the early 19th century until World War I. Its significance—marked by ten slag heaps from the late Iron Age to the first centuries CE (specifically 2nd century BCE to 4th century CE)—was recognized in the early 2000s.

The Jara copper mine, in the valley’s north, yielded siderite-free chalcopyrite exploited around the start of the Common Era (200 BCE to 200 CE). Studies in 2005 couldn’t determine whether underground workings were dug by indigenous peoples or Romans. The nearby Monhoa copper deposit, also northern, dates to the early 2nd century BCE. Lacking lamp niches typical of Roman techniques, it features two levels over 10 meters (33 ft) apart, linked by a gallery along a steeply inclined vein. Its lower section was briefly reused in the 18th century, showing signs of fire-setting.

The Aintziaga site, on the ridge dividing Baïgorry and Baztan valleys, likely from the early 1st millennium CE, suggests systematic Roman prospecting, given its distance from Banca’s main mines. Northwest, in Baztan, the Antestegui mine spans two levels 15 meters (49 ft) apart, reactivated around 1735 by German engineers from Baïgorry’s mines, building on Roman foundations.

The Hayra (or Teilary) site, northwest of Teilary Pass between 790 and 890 meters (2,590–2,920 ft) altitude near the Hayra stream’s confluence with the Nive des Aldudes, also dates to antiquity. Records from 1740 note Beugnière de la Tour, Banca smelter manager, targeting its silver-bearing galena. Late 1970s studies identified lead, zinc, silver, sphalerite, copper, and giobertite.

Gilles Parent posits that the Mehatze Pass site, at 1,200 meters (3,940 ft), also saw ancient exploitation.

==== Early Modern Period ====
In 2003, a talweg in the Pays Quint uncovered metallurgical slag, hinting at a 16th-century itinerant metallurgy, contemporary with the 250-year-old Navarrese hydraulic forges of Eugui, Valcarlos, and Aezkoa.

At Banca’s northern entrance, remnants of a metallurgical site with a blast furnace persist. A canal above, fed by upstream Nive waters, powers a wheel and bellows, injecting air via two nozzles into the furnace base. An adjacent building, also under the canal, houses forge fires and hammers to convert pig iron into wrought iron, plus a slitting mill for bar production.

Copper mining, attributed to Roman origins, began industrial operations in 1555, followed by iron extraction and processing in 1647. In April 1640, Louis XIV granted the Viscount of Etchauz—also known as Eschaud, Echaux, or des Chaux, from Bertrand d'Eschaud’s family and Béarn’s seneschal—permission to “exploit iron mines and build a forge to smelt iron.” The Etchauz forge operated for over a century; a blast furnace, built late 17th century by Marquis de Louvois, Louis XIV’s Secretary of State for War, supplied cannons to the Royal Navy and private firms by the mid-18th century. It ceased in 1785.

Copper mining resumed in 1741 under Swiss businessman Laurent Beugnière de la Tour, (Note: Born Laurenz Büngier in St. Gallen, he likely Gallicized his name during a 1715 Paris trip. Trading timber, copper, and gold between France and Holland, he partnered with Reinhard Nicolaus Pauli in 1729 to exploit Lower Navarre’s copper, silver, and gold mines.) naming the vein with three branches the “Three Kings Vein.” Both copper and iron processing consumed vast timber, devastating forests. A deal with the valley for iron mining timber forced copper operations to halt in 1767.

Banca’s mining peak, on Astoekoria’s slopes, occurred under Louis XV in 1756, employing 389 workers—including 13 German technicians—and yielding up to 120 tons (130 tons) of copper annually. (Note: Occupations included charcoal burners, muleteers, carpenters, timberers, locksmiths, blacksmiths, miners, mine sergeants, machinists, smelters, and stamp mill masters.) Silver-bearing copper from Ossès was also processed here. Activity waned during the Revolution; a June 27, 1793, fire—ignited by 400 valley residents led by refractory priest Inda—destroyed the facility. (Note: “On May 27, 1793, French troops withdrew from the village to La Fonderie. Aldudes residents welcomed the Spanish, and on June 3, joined them in looting the industrial site and nearby homes, reportedly led by priest Inda in surplice and stole, wielding a crucifix and torch.”) Iron forging stopped in 1786, and copper operations ceased in 1816—despite shafts reaching 110 meters (360 ft)—with the Baïgorry Mining Company’s collapse.

In 1825, a steel blast furnace rose on the site, using Ustelegi iron ore, supplying cannons and shot to the navy, hauled by road to Cambo, and then via the Nive to Bayonne. Active from 1826 to 1828, its 9-meter (30 ft) crucible produced over 4 tons (4.4 tons) of pig iron daily and 1,000 tons (1,100 tons) annually, yielding 600 tons (660 tons) of refined iron. Copper mining resumed mid-19th century, lasting until 1894, with ore shipped to Swansea, Wales, as local processing lagged—using the outdated Biscayan crucible (two-month process) until the Foix crucible arrived in 1750. The company folded in 1861, ending the valley’s steel industry.

In 1863, the Saint-Étienne-based bank Girard, Nicolas et Compagnie bought the site and concession, targeting copper and silver. Ore—two-thirds chalcopyrite, one-third silver-bearing gray copper—peaked in 1870 at 100 tons (110 tons) sent to Swansea, with silver at 9 kg (20 lb) per ton (1%) and copper at 9–17%. Output fell after 1878, stopping in 1893.

From 1908–1910, the Ossès and Banca Mining Company attempted to dewater the Three Kings Vein shaft, halting at 42 meters (138 ft) due to pump limits. Later probes, from the 1940s to 1978 by Georges Vié and Penarroya, found rich but discontinuous deposits, rendering mining uneconomical.

=== Contemporary economy ===
Since the late 20th century, the valley’s agriculture, dubbed “Basque mountain,” has centered on livestock and mixed farming. Raising Basque Black Pied pigs has surged, revitalized by the French Pork Institute (ITP). The Belaun cooperative, named for a pass linking Baztan and Aldudes valleys, was launched in 2010 to support young farmers and promote local products from valley resources. By the early 21st century, the valley’s sheep flock was the department’s largest, falling within the Ossau-Iraty AOC zone. The Hor Dago dairy, the valley’s sole cheese producer in 2013, opened in Urepel in November 2013. Onetik collects raw milk from upper Aldudes valley breeders to craft Bleu des Basques. Cattle farming, with about 6,500 head in 2002, focuses on meat production.

Collective lands, managed by the Baïgorry Valley Syndical Commission since 1838, cover a third of the canton’s 31,000 hectares (77,000 acres)—10,000 hectares (25,000 acres) in total.

Aldudes hosts Ets Pierre Oteiza, an artisanal charcuterie ranked among the department’s top 50 food businesses in 2015. A fish farm operates along the Urepel road.

Parts of the valley (Anhaux, Ascarat, Irouléguy, Lasse, and Saint-Étienne-de-Baïgorry) lie within the Irouléguy AOC wine region, certified since 1970. In the 13th century, Augustinian monks from Roncevaux cultivated a vast vineyard here, terracing the Arradoy and Jara slopes to supply wine to Camino Francés pilgrims en route to Santiago de Compostela.

== Local culture and heritage ==
=== Sites and monuments ===
The Baïgorry Valley is home to several landmarks listed in France’s Inventory of Historical Monuments. (Note: Each valley commune boasts distinguished monuments recognized by the Ministry of Culture, including Aldudes, Anhaux, Ascarat, Banca, Irouléguy, Lasse, Saint-Étienne-de-Baïgorry, and Urepel.) Numerous objects are also cataloged in the same inventory. (Note: Protected objects are found in Aldudes, Ascarat, Irouléguy, Lasse, Saint-Étienne-de-Baïgorry, and Urepel.) These protected sites and artifacts span the valley’s rich history, from the prehistoric Artxuita Dolmens and Arrondo Dolmen in Irouléguy to the Banca copper mines and the Lindus redoubt, built in 1813–1814 during the waning Spanish War of Independence. Other treasures include Anhaux’s historic homes—Jauregia (14th–17th centuries), Laxaga (15th–17th centuries), and Eiherartia farm (1730)—Irouléguy’s discoidal steles, and the churches and chapels gracing each village.

The current Château d'Etchaux, with sections dating to the 16th century, served as the seat of the Baïgorry fief, established in 1033 by Sancho the Great.

=== Natural heritage ===
The village of Aldudes and Esnazu hamlet are designated natural monuments under a decree dated March 17, 1943. The “park, château, and old bridge over the Nive” ensemble in Saint-Étienne-de-Baïgorry has been listed since August 8, 1944, while the Hurdos hamlet gained protected status on October 26, 1945.

==== Recognized natural areas ====
The Important Bird Area (IBA) dubbed “Aldudes Valley and Massif, Lindux Pass” spans 71% of Aldudes, 49% of Banca, 57% of Saint-Étienne-de-Baïgorry, and 60% of Urepel. It hosts nesting Black Woodpeckers (Dryocopus martius) and White-backed Woodpeckers (Dendrocopos leucotos). Beyond thousands of wood pigeons (Columba palumbus) in late summer, the area shelters raptors like the Red Kite (Milvus milvus), Western Marsh Harrier (Circus aeruginosus), Hen Harrier (Circus cyaneus), Montagu's Harrier (Circus pygargus), and Common Buzzard (Buteo buteo). The Black Stork (Ciconia nigra) is also recorded.

Birdlife specimens of the Aldudes Valley

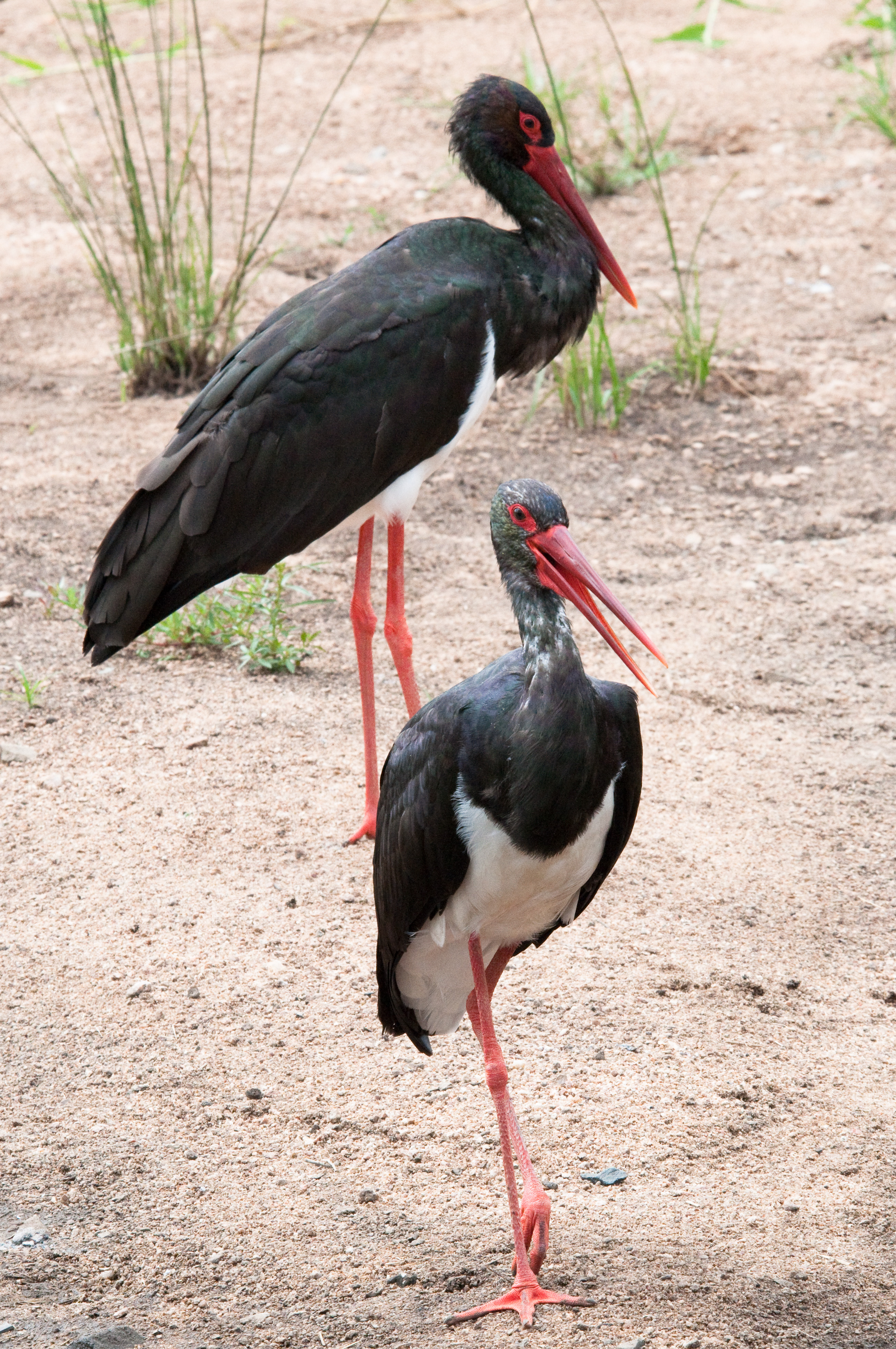
Wood Pigeon.

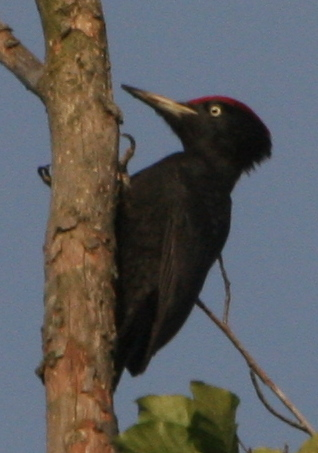
Black woodpecker.

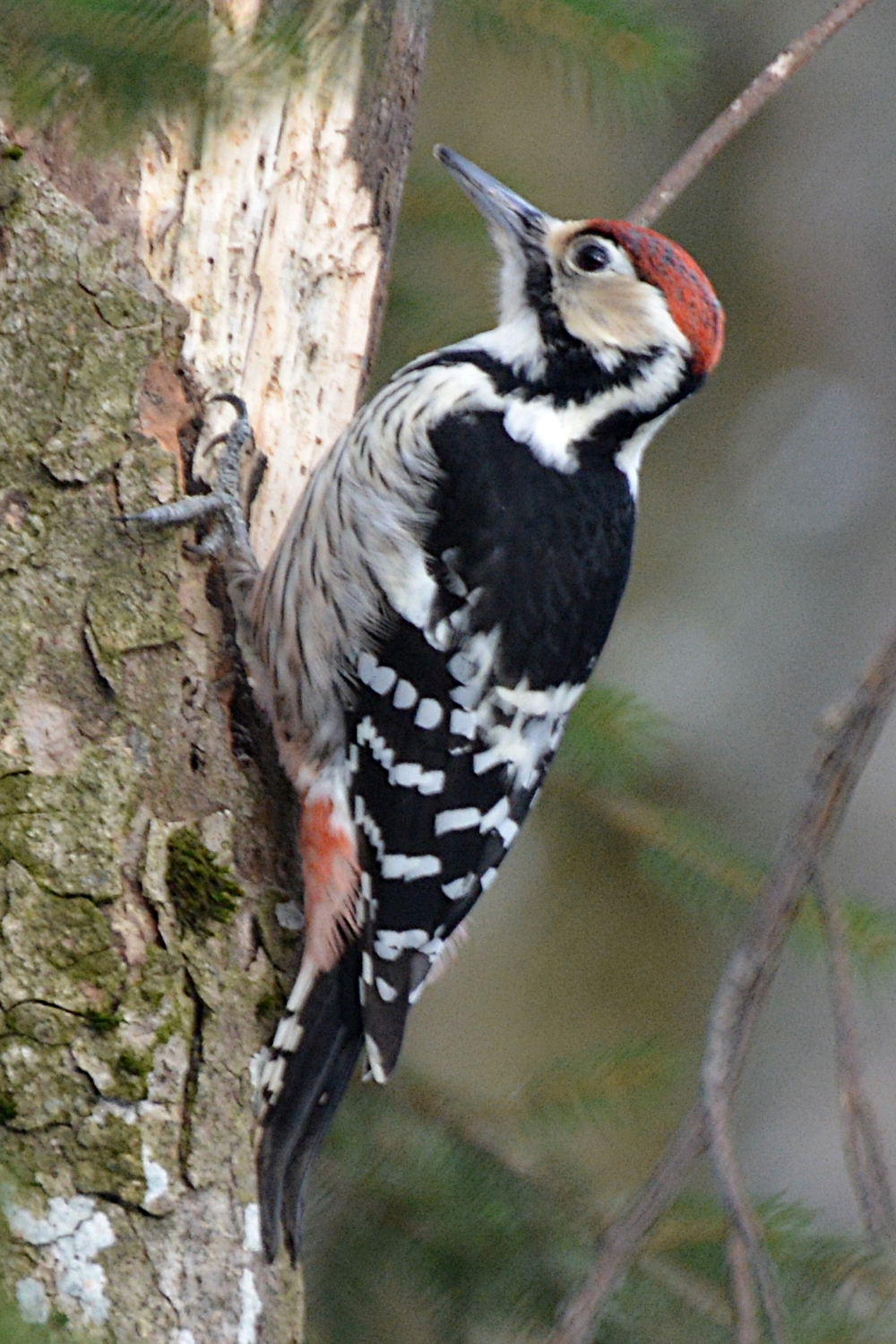
White-backed woodpecker.

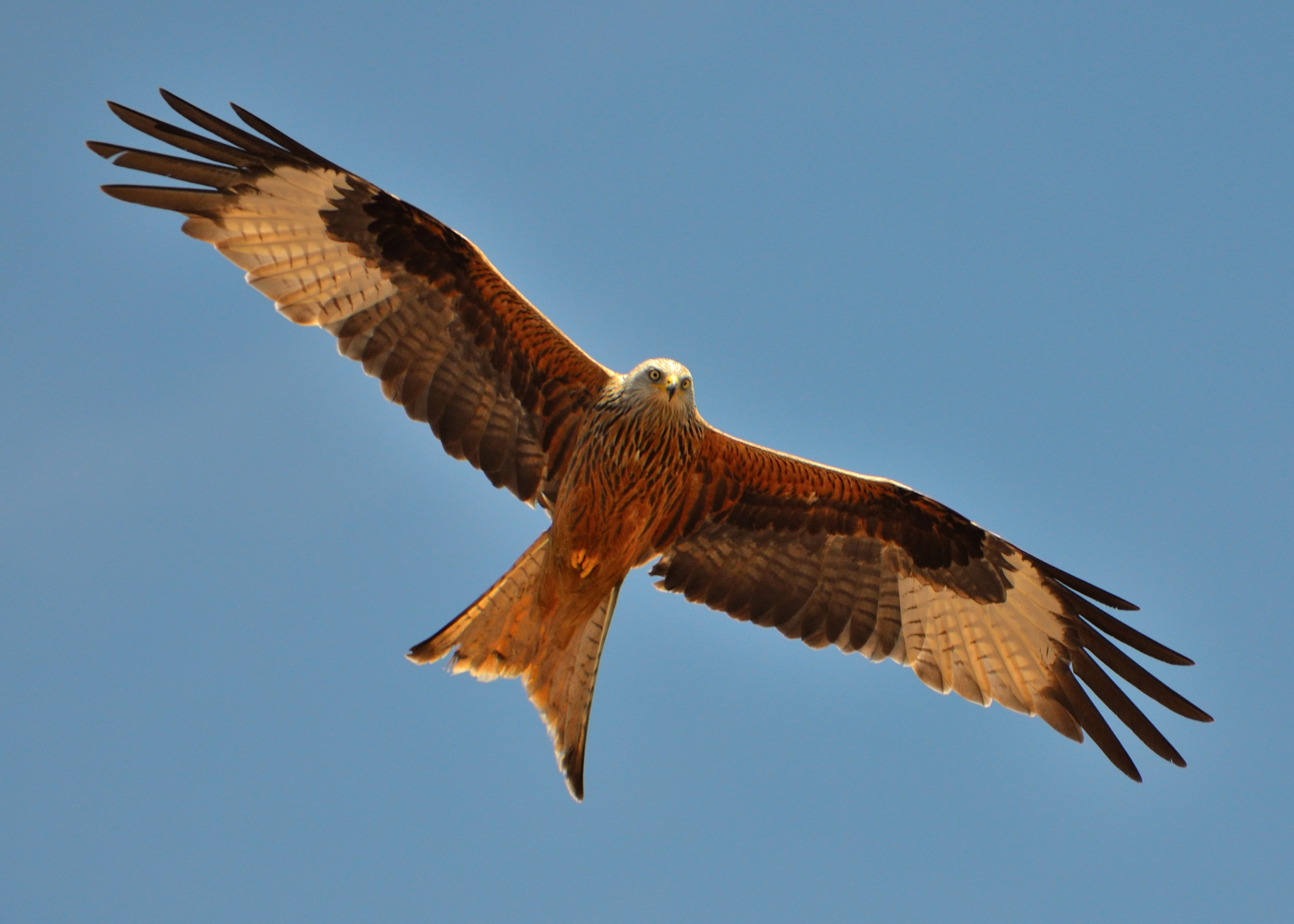
Red kite.

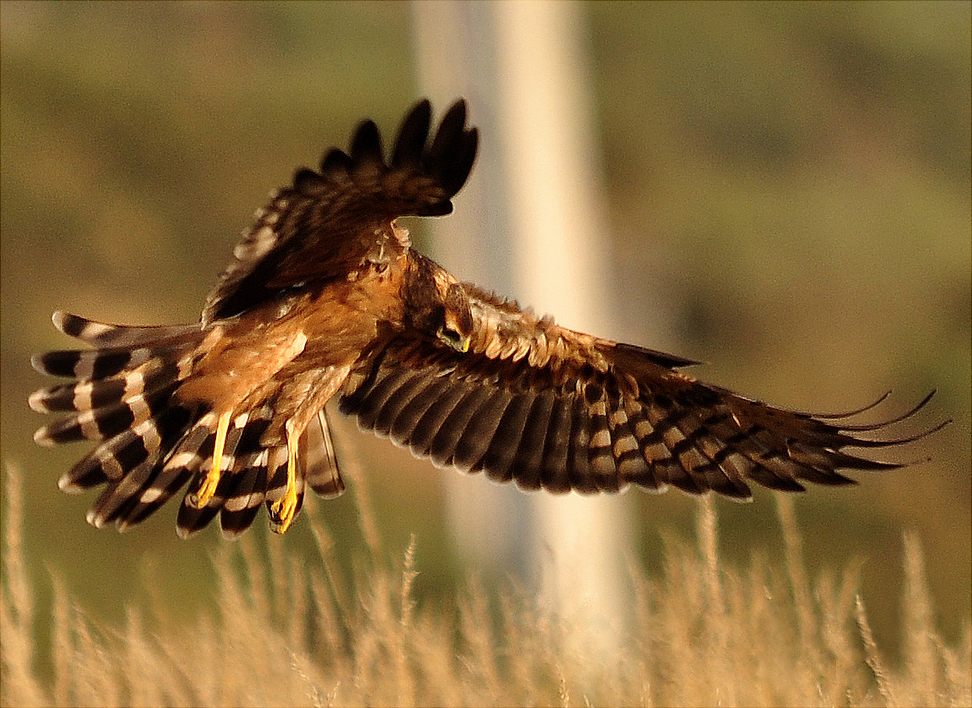
Montagu's Harrier.

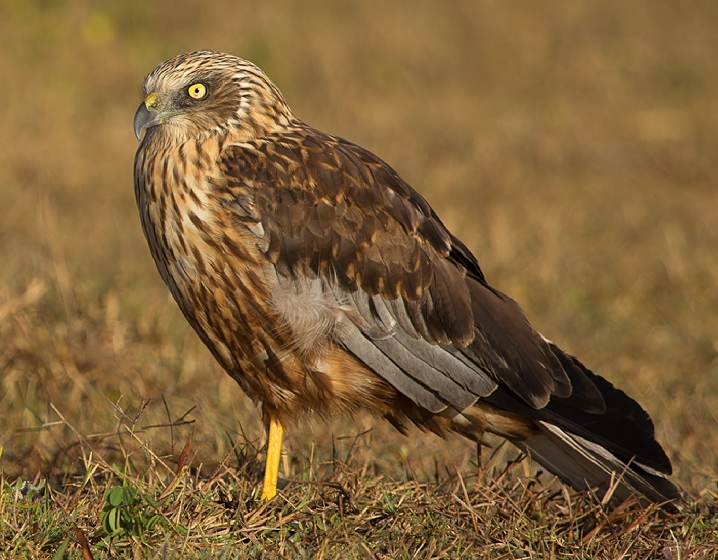
Marsh harrier.

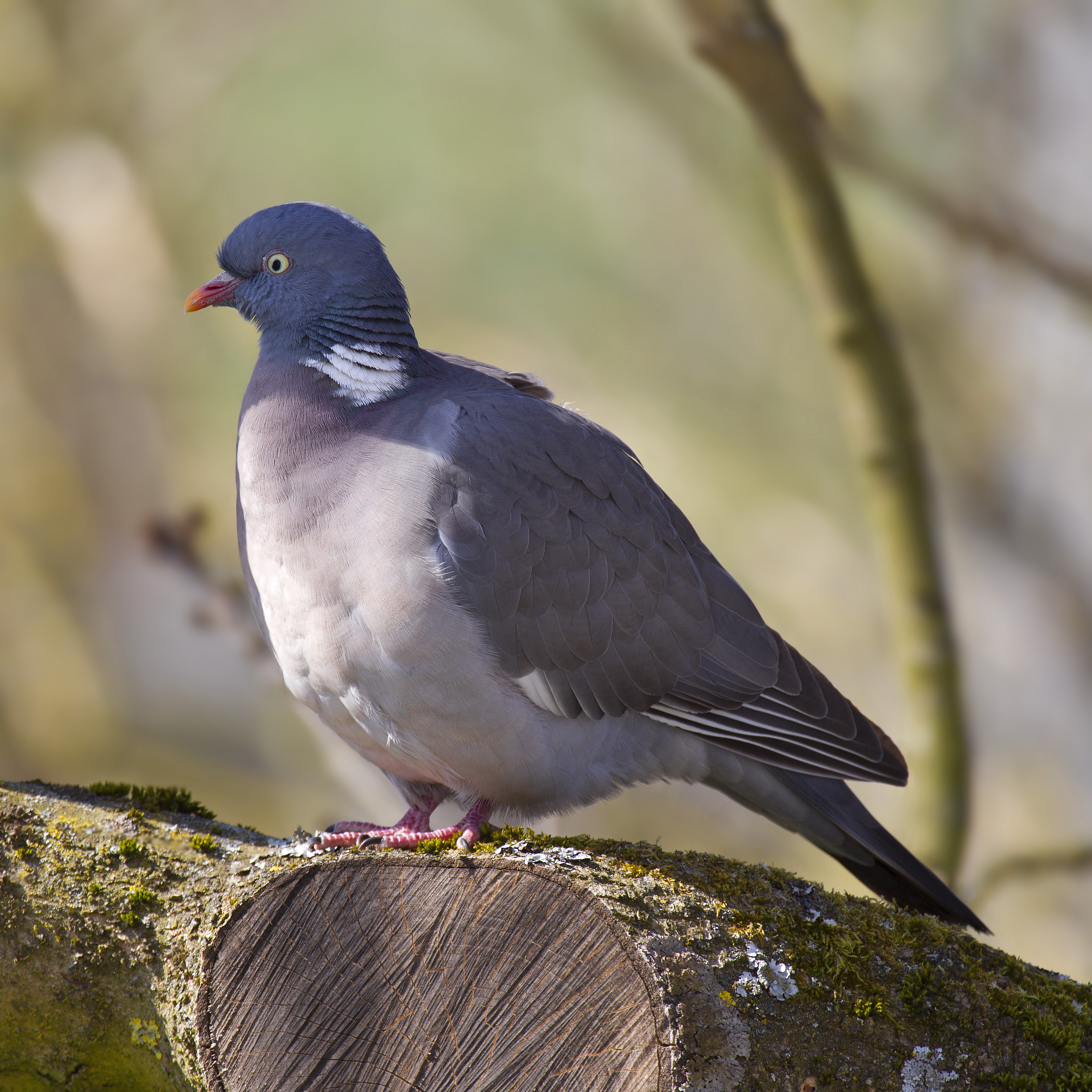
Wood pigeon.

Parts of the valley are classified as a Type I Zone naturelle d'intérêt écologique, faunistique et floristique (ZNIEFF), (Note: Type I ZNIEFFs are ecologically uniform areas hosting at least one rare or threatened species or habitat of local, regional, national, or European significance.) named “Peatlands of Elhorrieta and Elhorriko Kaskoa.” This 13-hectare (32-acre) ecosystem, between 660 and 860 meters (2,165–2,820 ft) altitude, is protected under the January 9, 1985, Mountain Law and the EU’s Habitats Directive 92/43/EEC, safeguarding natural habitats, fauna, and flora. The ZNIEFF highlights dual ecological values: heritage and function. Floristically, the peatland harbors ten sphagnum species, three exceedingly rare, including Sphagnum fallax, Sphagnum molle, and Sphagnum quinquefarium, alongside St Dabeoc's Heath (Daboecia cantabrica), Round-leaved sundew (Drosera rotundifolia), and Bog Asphodel (Narthecium ossifragum), per a 1993 survey. Functionally, it regulates water flow and curbs soil erosion.

Flora specimens of the Elhorrieta and Elhorriko Kaskoa peatlands

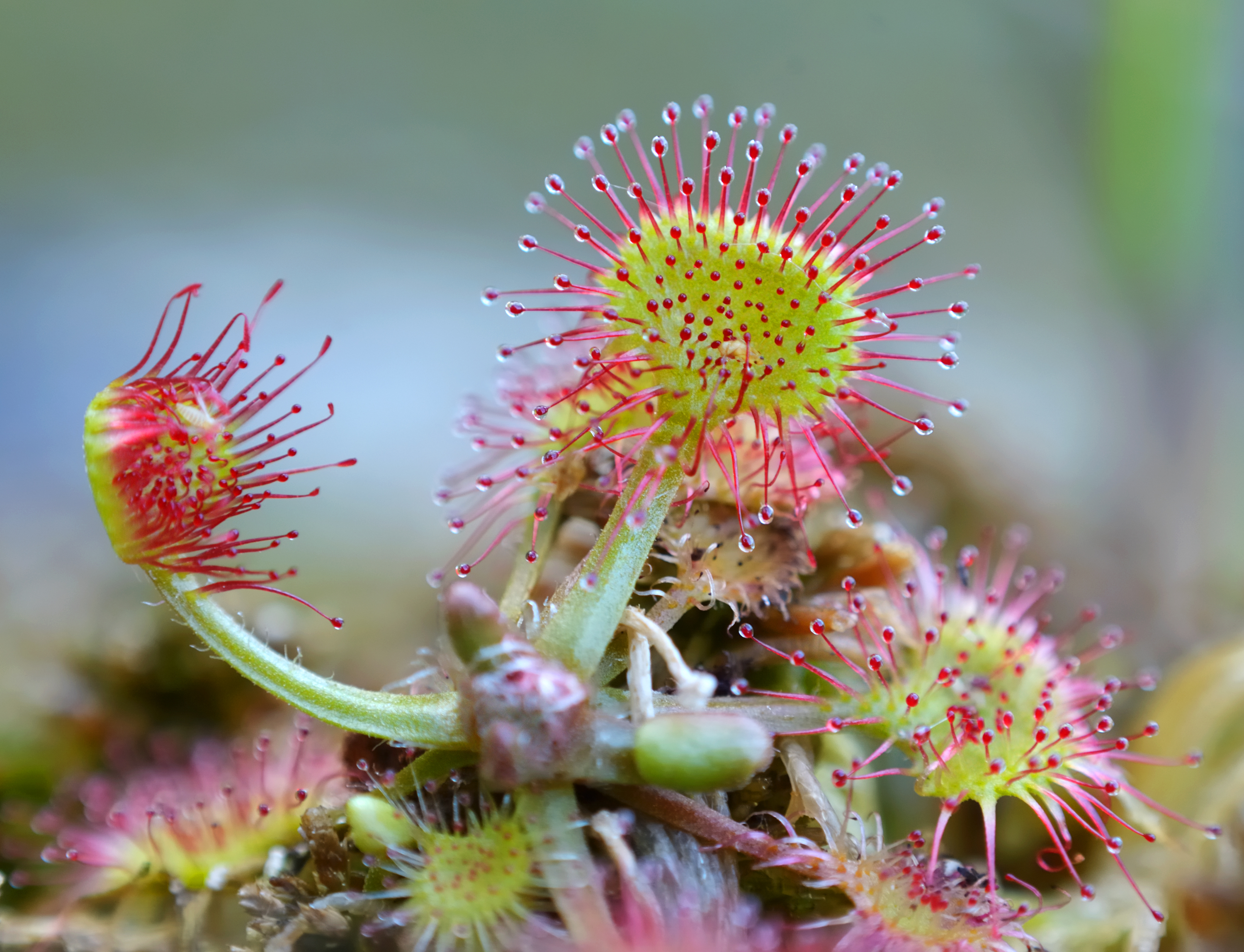
Bog Asphodel

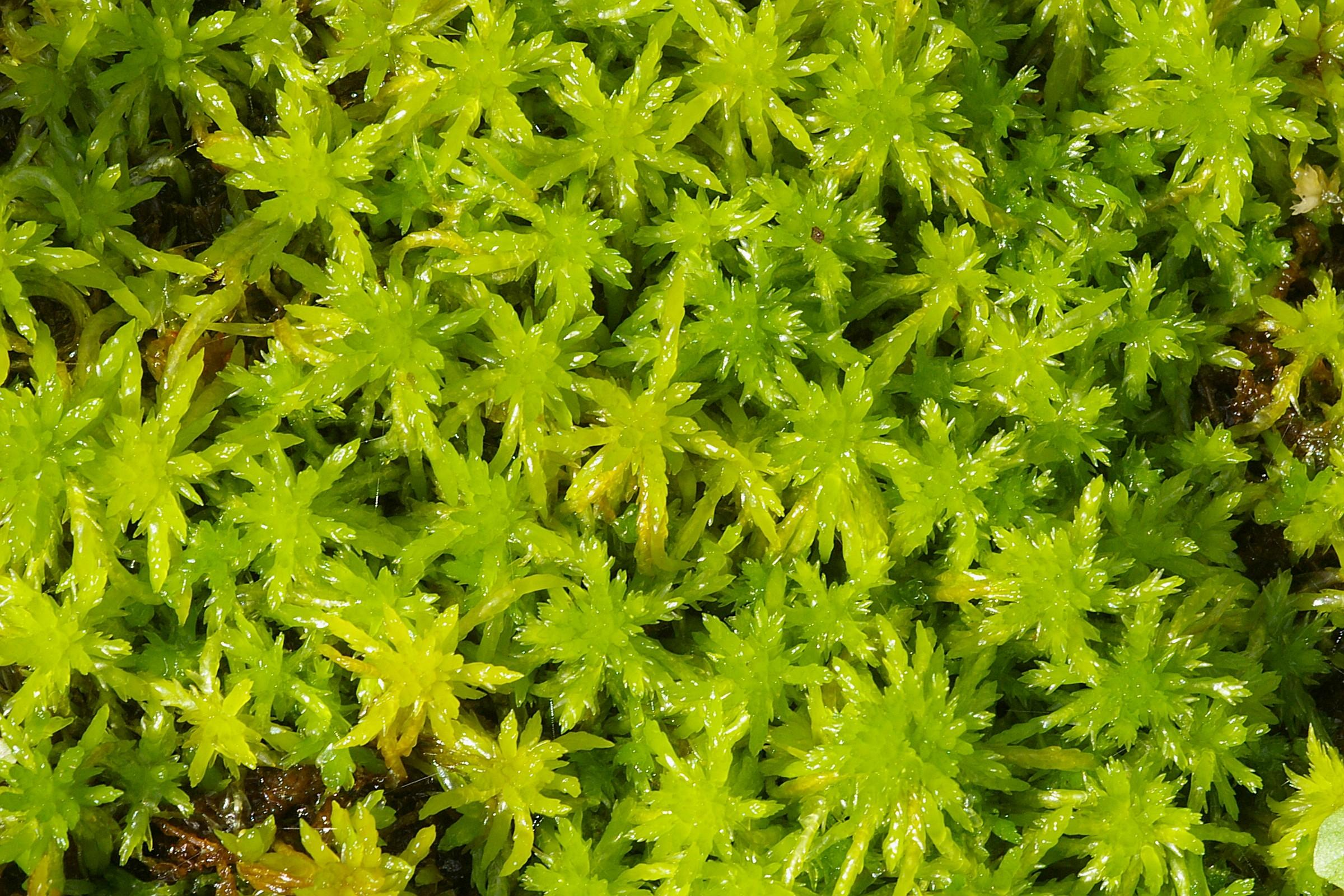
Sphagnum fallax

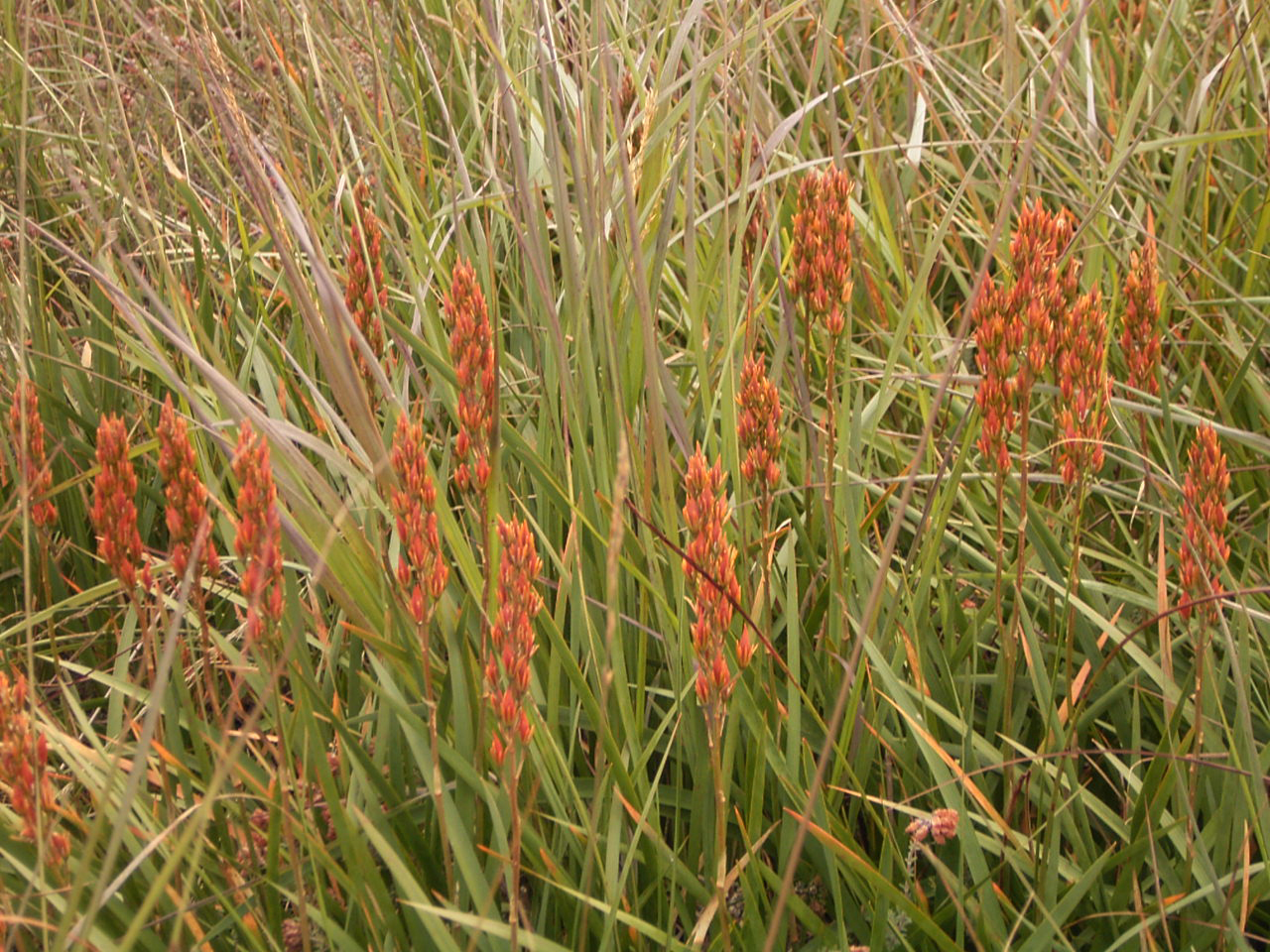
Marsh Narthecia.

=== Notable figures linked to the Baïgorry Valley ===
- Georges Lacombe (January 31, 1879, Orthez – July 1947, Paris) was a French linguist, Basque scholar, and academic fluent in Basque and French. On the eve of World War I, he collaborated with Jean Etchepare on a doctorate in Letters focusing on the Aldudes dialect.
- Bertrand d'Eschaud (1556 or 1557, Saint-Étienne-de-Baïgorry – 1641) was a prelate, serving as Bishop of Bayonne (1599–1617), Archbishop of Tours (1617–1641), Knight-Commander of the Holy Spirit, and chief almoner to Kings Henry IV (a relative) and Louis XIII.
- Manex Souhorcoa (d. 1784, Banca) was a pelota player whose tombstone is preserved at the Basque Museum and History of Bayonne.
- Jean Isidore Harispe (1568, Saint-Étienne-de-Baïgorry – 1855, Lacarre) was a military leader and politician, elevated to Marshal of France on December 11, 1851, by Louis-Napoléon Bonaparte, and later a senator under the Second French Empire.
- Inda, nicknamed Perkain (late 18th century, Aldudes), was a renowned pelota player whose fame and a 1793 incident inspired the opera Perkain le Basque, a lyric drama by Pierre-Barthélemy Gheusi and Jean Poueigh.
- Jean Iraçabal (1851, Anhaux – 1929, buried in Saint-Étienne-de-Baïgorry) was a French military officer.
- Michel Olçomendy (1901, Saint-Étienne-de-Baïgorry – 1977, Singapore) became the first Archbishop of Singapore in 1972.
- Pierre Narbaitz (1910, Ascarat – 1984, Cambo-les-Bains) was a French Basque historian, writer, and academic proficient in Basque and French.
- Fernando Aire Etxart, known as Xalbador (June 19, 1920 – November 7, 1976, Urepel), was a celebrated bertsolari.
- Philippe Bidart (b. 1953, Saint-Étienne-de-Baïgorry) is a historic leader of the Basque revolutionary group Iparretarrak.
- Pascal Mazzotti (1923, Saint-Étienne-de-Baïgorry – 2002, Saint-Ouen-l'Aumône) was a French actor.
- Jean Haritschelhar (1923, Saint-Étienne-de-Baïgorry – 2013, Biarritz) was a Basque scholar, politician, literature researcher, and academic, who served as mayor of Saint-Étienne-de-Baïgorry from 1971 to 1980.

== See also ==
- Pays Quint
- Lower Navarre
- Saint-Étienne-de-Baïgorry
- Irouléguy
- Aldudes
- Banca
- Navarre

== Bibliography ==
- Bidart, Pierre (2002). La vallée de Baïgorry [The Baïgorry Valley] (in French). Preface in Basque, Spanish, English, and German. Saint-Étienne-de-Baïgorry: Éditions Izpegi. p. 273. ISBN 2-909262-24-3. – Pierre Bidart holds a doctorate in humanities and is a professor of anthropology at the University of Bordeaux II.
- Charpentier, Jean de (1823). Essai sur la constitution géognostique des Pyrénées [Essay on the Geognostic Constitution of the Pyrenees] (in French). Paris: Levrault. p. 632. – Jean de Charpentier (Johann G. F. von Charpentier), a German-Swiss geologist, directed the Vaud canton mines. His father, Johann Friedrich Wilhelm Toussaint von Charpentier, engineered Pyrenean copper mines.
- Romani, Carlos Fernández de Casadevante (1989). La frontière Franco-Espagnole et les relations de voisinage [The Franco-Spanish Border and Neighborly Relations] (in French). Preface by Daniel Bardonnet. Bayonne: Harriet. p. 453. ISBN 2-904348-36-0. – Carlos Fernández de Casadevante Romani is a professor of public international law at the Rey Juan Carlos University of Madrid. Daniel Bardonnet is secretary-general of the Hague Academy of International Law.
- Goyheneche, Eugène (1979). Le Pays basque [The Basque Country] (in French). Pau: Société nouvelle d’éditions régionales et de diffusion. p. 671. – Eugène Goyheneche was a Basque abertzale, historian, and archivist-paleographer.
- Haritschelhar, Jean (2002). "La littérature basque dans la vallée de Baïgorry" [Basque Literature in the Baïgorry Valley]. La vallée de Baïgorry [The Baïgorry Valley] (in French). Saint-Étienne-de-Baïgorry: Éditions Izpegi. p. 273. ISBN 2-909262-24-3. – Jean Haritschelhar is an emeritus professor at the University of Bordeaux III and president of the Basque Language Academy.
- Machot, Pierre; Parent, Gilles (2002). "Mines et métallurgie en vallée de Baïgorry" [Mines and Metallurgy in the Baïgorry Valley]. La vallée de Baïgorry [The Baïgorry Valley] (in French). Saint-Étienne-de-Baïgorry: Éditions Izpegi. p. 273. ISBN 2-909262-24-3. – Pierre Machot is an agrégé professor and history doctorate. Gilles Parent, a geologist and speleologist, is part of the Eusko Arkeologia association.
- Orpustan, Jean-Baptiste (2002). "La vallée de Baïgorry en quelques mots" [The Baïgorry Valley in a Few Words]. La vallée de Baïgorry [The Baïgorry Valley] (in French). Saint-Étienne-de-Baïgorry: Éditions Izpegi. p. 273. ISBN 2-909262-24-3. – Jean-Baptiste Orpustan is an emeritus professor at the University of Bordeaux-Montaigne.
- Orpustan, Jean-Baptiste (2006). Nouvelle toponymie basque [New Basque Toponymy] (in French). Presses Universitaires de Bordeaux. p. 244. ISBN 9782867813962.
- Salzedo Izu, Joaquin (1998). La frontière franco-espagnole : lieu de conflits interétatiques et de collaboration interrérionale [The Franco-Spanish border: a place of inter-state conflict and inter-regional collaboration] (in French). Bordeaux: Presses universitaires de Bordeaux. p. 160. ISBN 2-86781-224-0. – Joaquin Salzedo Izu is a professor of legal history at the University of Navarre.
- Veyrin, Philippe (1975) [1947]. Les Basques de Labourd, de Soule et de Basse-Navarre : leur histoire et leurs traditions [The Basques of Labourd, Soule and Basse-Navarre: their history and traditions] (in French). Grenoble: Arthaud. p. 366. ISBN 2-7003-0038-6. – Philippe Veyrin was a painter, historian, and Basque scholar.
- Viers, Georges (1960). Pays basque français et Barétous [French Basque Country and Barétous] (in French). Toulouse: Privat. p. 604. – Georges Viers (1910–1998) was a geographer, emeritus professor at the University of Toulouse-Jean Jaurès, and director of its Daniel Faucher Geography Institute.
- Viers, Georges (2002). La vallée de Baïgorry [The Baïgorry Valley] (in French). Saint-Étienne-de-Baïgorry: Éditions Izpegi. p. 273. ISBN 2-909262-24-3.
