= Hautz =

Hautz is a Navarrese oronym. Like many toponyms, it tends to be conservatively kept, even though the dominant language changes. The etymology is possibly from Proto-Basque.

It may be found in the following place names:

- Hautza or Autza (1,306 m), a mountain in the west of Saint-Étienne-de-Baïgorry
- Ixtauz (also known as Istauz, Ichtauz) for Aitz-hautz, an example of tautological place name, in the south of the Hautza (1,024 m)
- Hauzkoa (1268 m), with the diminutive -ko, a mount near Béhorléguy
- Etxauz, name of the castle of Saint-Étienne-de-Baïgorry
- Hautzai Pass (965 m), in Urepel
- Auztarri (1,412 m), for Autz-harri, a mount above the dam of Irabia, in the Irati Valley, in Navarre.
