= Marijane Minaberri =

Basque author and radio broadcaster

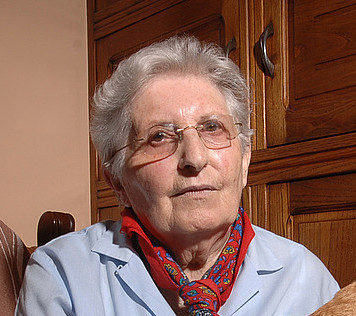
- Minaberri in 2007
- Born: 7 September 1926; Banca, Pyrénées-Atlantiques, France
- Died: 23 February 2017 (aged 90); Bordeaux, France
- Other name: Marie-Jeanne Minaberry
- Occupations: Author; Radio broadcaster

Marijane Minaberri or Marie-Jeanne Minaberry (7 September 1926 – 23 February 2017) was a Basque author and radio broadcaster. She began writing articles for herself at the age of 20 and then worked as Banca's town hall municipal secretary for a decade. Minaberri then taught 10 and 11-year-old students at Bayonne's Saint Louis de Gonzague church before beginning a broadcasting career on Radio Côte Basque, Gure Irratia and Lapurdi Irratia. She wrote a series of poems and children's stories in both Basque in French and was a member of the Euskaltzaindia. Minaberri is considered a pioneer in Basque radio broadcasting and researchers consider two of her works the beginning of learning of Basque children's literature.

== Personal background ==
On 7 September 1926, Minaberri was born in Banca, Pyrénées-Atlantiques in the Baigorri Valley of the Lower Navarre region. She was the third of four children in her family, of whom she played Basque pelota with, and her Basque-speaking father was a worker in a small country powered by the town's water from the Nive and Marija rivers. Minaberri was educated at the village school and then attended school in Saint-Palais to continue her education. She went to Anglet to obtain a bachelor's degree but later withdrew due to her mother becoming unwell. Minaberri died on 23 February 2017, in Bordeaux. Her funeral was held on the afternoon of 1 March.

== Career ==
Minaberri began writing articles for herself when she was aged 20 after one of her friends died. She then developed writing down her feelings as a hobby in an era when French began coming into North Basque society. When she was 22 years old, Minaberri started working as Braca's town hall municipal secretary for the following decade. She and her family relocated to Ustaritz in 1954 after leaving her job as a secretary and she started to teach 10 and 11-year-old students at the Saint Louis de Gonzague church in Bayonne. In 1957, Minaberri began working as a secretary and journalist for the Basque Eclair newspaper in Bayonne and later the Sud Ouest newspaper in 1975 when it took over the publication and she remained there until 1990. While also working in the printed press, she was on the radio. Minaberri broadcast on Radio Côte Basque owned by the Radio France network. She focused on Bertsolaritza, children's corner and audience requests to play certain records. Minaberri also broadcast on Gure Irratia and Lapurdi Irratia.

She also had a writing career in which she wrote in both Basque and French. Minaberri firstly wrote a series of poems before turning to children's stories and she published most of her poems in the Herria, Gure Herria, Almanaka and Pan-pin magazines. Her first two poems, Amañokantua and Esku miresgarria, were published in 1960. In 1963, Minaberri authored her first book of short stories called Itchulingo anderea (Goiztiri), which included Erregina gaztea, Eñaut eta sagutxo and Oreinaren emaitza. Two years later, she published the poetry book Xoria kantari featuring 23 poems with 23 Henri Laulhé illustrations. Minaberri wrote the children's stories Mokhor bat eta mokhor bi, Begietakoa, Joanes Zirtzil, Manexen nahigabeak, Auzitegian, Marikitaren otoitza, Eri haundia, Abereen eguberri and Eñaut eta sagutxo. She collected a series of plays and complied them into the Haur antzerkia in 1983. Minaberri was also an fervent Basque scholar. She was a member of the Euskaltzaindia from 30 October 1964 until 24 April 1998 when she became one of its honorary members. Minaberri was also an honorary member of the Euskal Kulturgileen Kidegoa from 1980. She also published several books in lexicography working with Manuel Mitxelena and Piarres Lafitte.

== Legacy ==
She received the Toribio Alzaga par l'Académie from the Euskal Kulturgileen Kidegoa in 1982. Two of Minaberri's books from 1963 are considered by researchers for the beginning of Basque children's literature and she is considered a pioneer in Basque radio. In June 2017, a tribute to Minaberri was organised at Sanoki hall by the Sareinak group.
