= Autza =

Autza may refer to:

- Auza or Autza (Aoitça, 1 280; Aoynça, 1 350), a village in the Ultzama Valley, in Navarre.
- Hautza or Autza (1 306 m), a mount in the west of Saint-Étienne-de-Baïgorry in Lower Navarre.
