= Quinto Real (place) =

Spanish territory with exclusive use by France

Coordinates: 43.0330°N 1.4330°W

Quinto Real (French: Pays Quint, Basque: Kintoa) is a Spanish territory with exclusive rights of use by France on the border between the two countries, in the Pyrenees mountains, in northeastern Navarre.

== Toponymy ==
For the archivist Paul Raymond, the name of Pays Quint comes from gleaning rights, called in the region droits du quint, given by Charles III of Navarre to the barons of Espelette; the holder of these rights had the right to claim one fifth of any cargo passing through these roads.

== History ==
This place was originally held in indivision by several villages, and no one could establish himself permanently.

Since the migration of cadets, deprived of any right to heirship by primogeniture, in this desert place, and the division of Navarre into Spanish and French parts, this area was the object of disputes between French shepherds from Saint-Étienne-de-Baïgorry and Spanish shepherds from Erro, and several measures which aimed to reduce these conflicts failed, such as a royal order on 1614 and the 1659 Treaty of the Pyrenees. The end of indivision was decided on 1785 which caused further troubles.

On 1856, the borders between France and Spain was settled by the Treaty of Bayonne in order to reduce such conflicts; among these clauses, the Quinto Real was divided in two, with the South becoming wholly Spanish and France retaining exclusive permanent rights of use on the pastures in the Northern area.

== Economy ==
As of 2011, there are eight houses for a total population of about thirty people. The economy is mainly based on the extensive raising of pigs.

== Legal status ==
The area is part of Spain but is administered by France; the inhabitants are French citizens by default but have the right to dual citizenship. Moreover, France pays a rent to Spain for the use of pastures in this area.

As a result of the fact Spain has the ownership of the soil, taxation is affected and divided, with taxation on the soil paid to Spain while other taxes are paid to France. The Guardia Civil maintain order while utilities are furnished by France: La Poste distributes the mail and EDF electricity. The inhabitants are French citizens, being schooled in France and formerly being conscripted into the French military.

Each May, cattle going to the Quinto Real are marked with a special symbol and their owners have to pay €71 per head (2011 costs) to the Erro valley.

== See also ==
- Banca, Pyrénées-Atlantiques
- Pheasant Island
- France-Spain border
- Baïgorry Valley
