= Sphagnum molle =

Scientific classification
- Kingdom: Plantae
- Division: Bryophyta
- Class: Sphagnopsida
- Order: Sphagnales
- Family: Sphagnaceae
- Genus: Sphagnum
- Species: S. molle

Binomial name
- Sphagnum molle Sull.

Species of moss

Sphagnum molle, the Blushing Bog-moss is a species of moss belonging to the family Sphagnaceae.

It is native to Europe and Northern America.

== Characteristics ==
This moss type is typically pale or white-green in colour, with hints of pink. It formulates as tight mats, with a smooth surface. The branch leaves are broad and concave and the stem leaves are large, especially in comparison to the branch leaves.

== Habitat ==
Sphagnum molle is known to appear on wet heathland, boggy grassland, peaty streamsides, occurring mainly along the West coast of the United Kingdom, in areas of high rainfall.
