= Lasse, Pyrénées-Atlantiques =

Lasse Lasa
- Commune
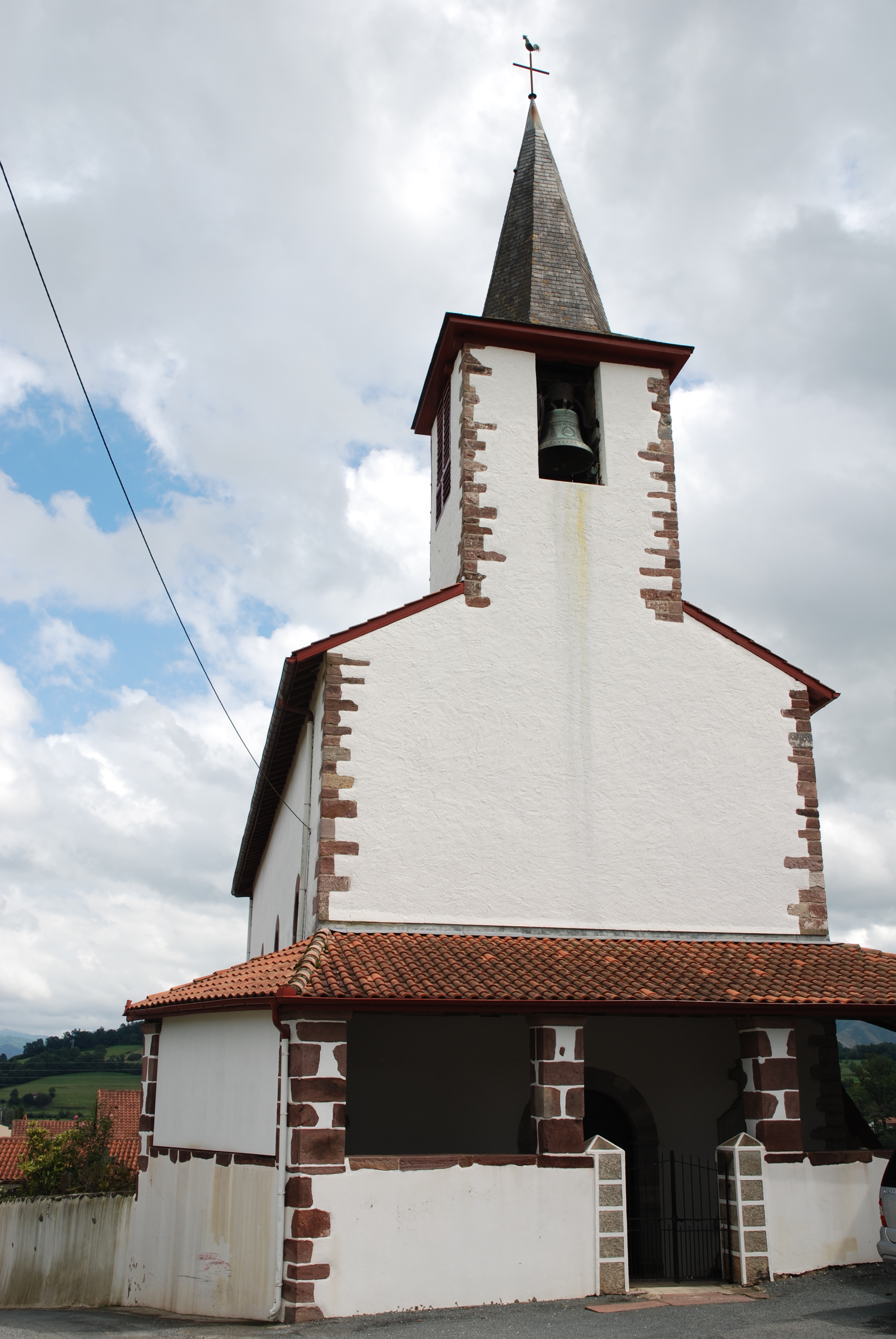
- The church of Lasse
- Location of Lasse
- Location within France Location within Nouvelle-Aquitaine
- Coordinates: 43°09′29″N 1°15′32″W
- Country: France
- Region: Nouvelle-Aquitaine
- Department: Pyrénées-Atlantiques
- Arrondissement: Bayonne
- Canton: Montagne Basque
- Intercommunality: CA Pays Basque

Government
  - Mayor (2020–2026): Michel Idiart
- Area^{1}: 14.79 km^{2} (5.71 sq mi)
- Elevation: 220 m (720 ft)
- Highest elevation: 1,247 m (4,091 ft)
- Lowest elevation: 176 m (577 ft)
- Population (2023): 334
  - Density: 22.6/km^{2} (58.5/sq mi)
- Time zone: UTC+01:00 (CET)
  - Summer (DST): UTC+02:00 (CEST)
- INSEE/Postal code: 64322 /64220
- ^{1} French Land Register data, which excludes lakes, ponds, glaciers > 1 km^{2} (0.386 sq mi or 247 acres) and river estuaries.

Lasse (French pronunciation: [las]; Basque: Lasa; Occitan: Cansat) is a commune in the Pyrénées-Atlantiques department in south-western France.

== See also ==
- Communes of the Pyrénées-Atlantiques department
