= Banca, Pyrénées-Atlantiques =

Banca Banka
- Commune
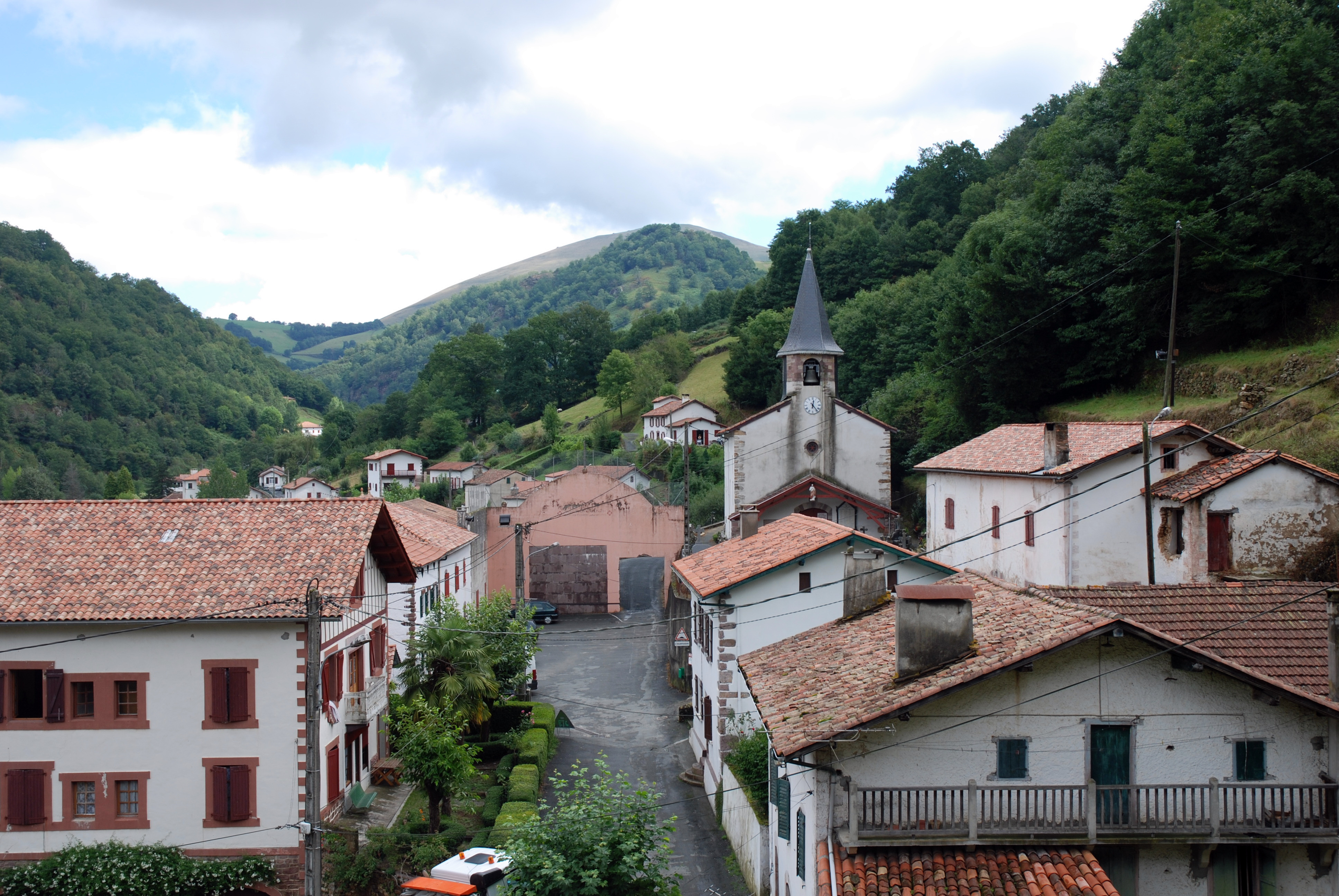
- A general view of Banca
- Location of Banca
- Location within France Location within Nouvelle-Aquitaine
- Coordinates: 43°07′39″N 1°22′23″W
- Country: France
- Region: Nouvelle-Aquitaine
- Department: Pyrénées-Atlantiques
- Arrondissement: Bayonne
- Canton: Montagne Basque
- Intercommunality: CA Pays Basque

Government
  - Mayor (2020–2026): Michel Oçafrain
- Area^{1}: 49.60 km^{2} (19.15 sq mi)
- Elevation: 522 m (1,713 ft)
- Highest elevation: 1,275 m (4,183 ft)
- Lowest elevation: 231 m (758 ft)
- Population (2023): 358
  - Density: 7.22/km^{2} (18.7/sq mi)
- Time zone: UTC+01:00 (CET)
  - Summer (DST): UTC+02:00 (CEST)
- INSEE/Postal code: 64092 /64430
- ^{1} French Land Register data, which excludes lakes, ponds, glaciers > 1 km^{2} (0.386 sq mi or 247 acres) and river estuaries.

Banca (French pronunciation: [bɑ̃ka]; Basque: Banka) is a commune of the Pyrénées-Atlantiques department in the Nouvelle-Aquitaine region of south-western France. It is part of the former province of Lower Navarre.

== Geography ==
Banca is located in the Aldudes valley on the banks of the Nive des Aldudes some 15 km south-west of Saint-Jean-Pied-de-Port. The western and eastern borders of the commune are the national frontier between France and Spain. Access to the commune is by the D948 road from Saint-Étienne-de-Baïgorry in the north which passes through the commune and the village and continues south-west to Aldudes. There are no crossing points in the commune to Spain. The commune is mainly rugged alpine pastures.

=== Hydrography ===
The Nive des Aldudes flows from Aldudes in the south-west, gathering tributaries such as the Antchignoko Erreka, the Ruisseau d'Hayra, the Latcharrako Erreka, and the Belechiko Erreka on the northern border, and continues north-east to join the Nive south of Saint-Martin-d'Arrossa. The Ruisseau d'Hayra rises in the south of the commune and flows north gathering tributaries such as the Lehaltzarteko Erreka, the Caminarteko Erreka, and the Legarzuko Erreka to join the Nive des Aldudes near the village.

=== Places and Hamlets ===
- Achistoy
- Agnesto
- Amosta
- Antcharteko Borda
- Antcheigno
- Antcholako Etchola
- Antonénéa
- Apialépoa
- Ardaza
- Argaray
- Argaray (wood)
- Arrabit
- Array
- Artéko Borda
- Asundreykoborda
- Atchaurra
- Ausquiénéa
- Barberaénéa
- Barnetchia
- Basoritz
- Beguibelcha
- Behostemetaka
- Berginanto
- Berhain (pass)
- Betripeillonénéa
- Betrizina
- Bichar
- Bidabéheréa
- Bihurrieta
- Bordacharréa
- Bustanénéa
- Cardinalia
- Carminatéko Borda
- Chabukody Lépoa
- Champagne
- Chanchoénéa
- Changala
- Chaochako Kaskoa
- Chasperro
- Chinta
- Chiriatéguia
- Chuhy
- Churritcheguy
- Cocagaïchto
- Colomio
- Curutcheko Kaskoa
- Curutchetako Borda
- Dartépé
- Dominé
- Ehuntzaroy (pass, 971m)
- Elhorrieta (pass, 831m)
- Elichaldia
- Erdizako Borda
- Erreguéréa
- Errekaénéa
- Erremerreka
- Errolako Ithurria
- Esculeguy
- Etcheberria
- Eyhérazaïna
- Eyhérazaïnako Borda>
- Fagaldénéa
- Galant
- Gathuly Béhéréa
- Gathulyko Ithurria
- Gnafarénéa
- Gnimigno
- Golko
- Golomio Ithurria
- Goroldi
- Gorria
- Gosnaisto
- Guichonaenea
- Guildeizar
- Guzmuztiko Borda
- Halzéta
- Harguintoa
- Harrigaitzeko Kaskoa
- Harrigorri
- Harzia
- Hauzay
- Hayra
- Hayra (forest)
- Hayra Sar
- Hortz Zorrotz (rocks)
- Ilharragorria
- Ilharragorrikomalda
- Indiano
- Iramebako Borda
- Iramehaca
- Irausta
- Ithurrialde Béhéréa
- Ithurrialde Garaya
- Jaureguibeheréa
- Joanes Ederra
- Jokutako Lépoa
- Katchaenéa
- Labaquia
- Lechéa
- Legarzuko Borda
- Legaza (mill)
- Lehaltzarte
- Lekayoénéa
- Lepeder
- Lepobelcha
- Lezetako Lépoa
- Lindus
- Manechénéa
- Maneixhandy
- Marieyhéra
- Maristola Ithurria
- Maritcho
- Marmaroa
- Martinbelchénéa
- Matchin Ithurria
- Meharroztegui (pass, 738m)
- Mehatzé (pass, 1133m)
- Menta
- Minchendo
- Mizpira (pass, 832m)
- Mizparachar (pass, 1139m)
- Moroinborda
- Mutikoénéa
- Musquet
- Ohakoa
- Olapideko Etchola
- Olhaberrieta
- Ondarlako Ithurria
- Orkastia
- Otsachar
- Otsahartéa
- Otsarrapeguy
- Otsartéa
- Oyhançaro
- Pago Zelhay (pass, 888m)
- Peilloénéa
- Peilloeneko Borda
- Petanénéa
- Petechaénéa
- Premonio
- Tchipitcho Etchola
- Teylary or Nahala (pass, 932m)
- Tipitto
- Todoria
- Turitchia
- Uhaillen Borda
- Uhaldéa
- Urbaztarréa
- Urlabéhéréa
- Urlagaraya
- Urritzolahandiko Etchola
- Uzkalépoa
- Zaku
- Zakuko Borda
- Zubiarin
- Zubiarinzahar
- Zumazoko

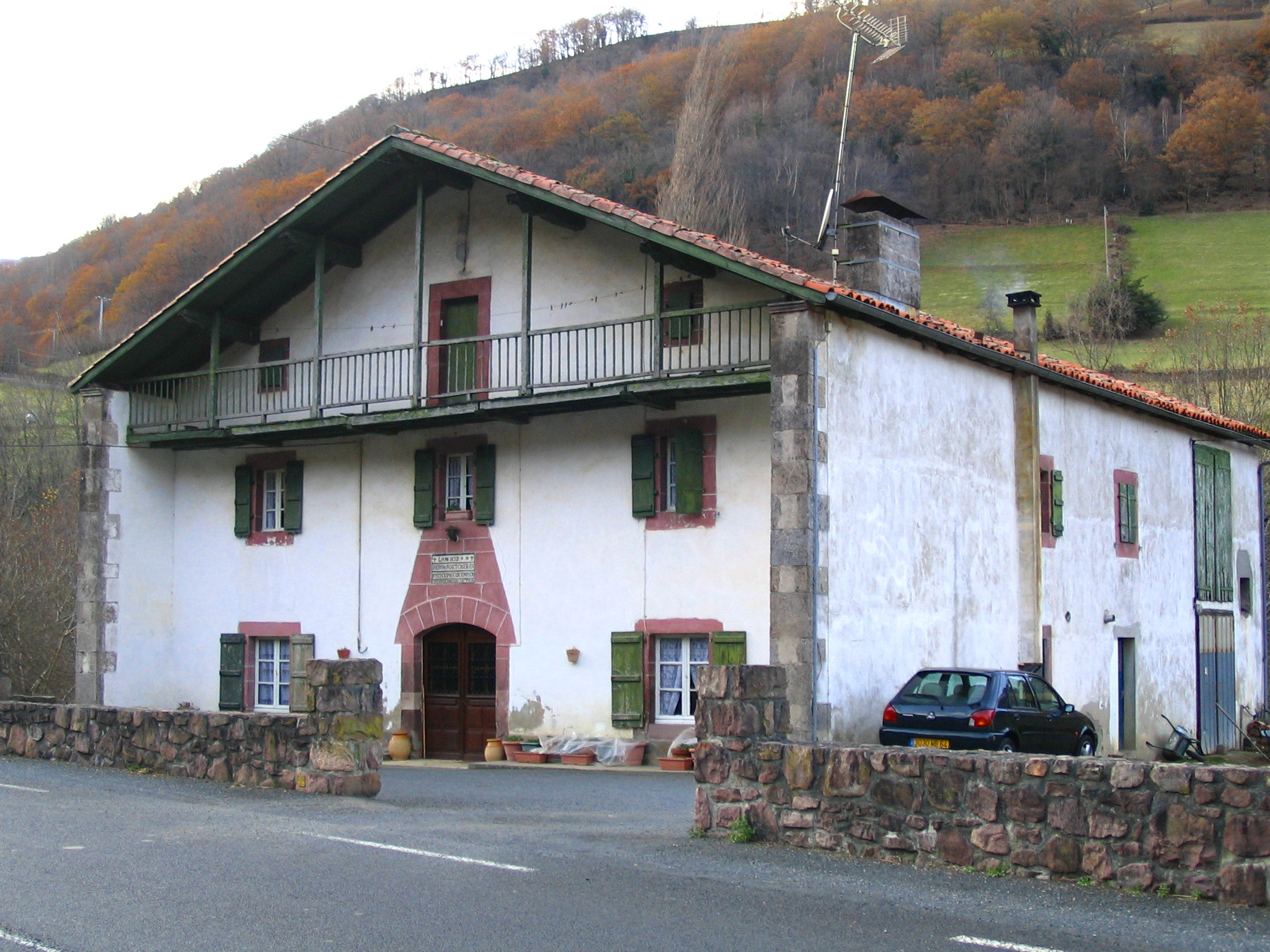
Traditional house in the Aldudes Valley.

=== Climate ===
Climate data for Banca, Pyrénées-Atlantiques (1991–2020 normals, extremes 1949–present)
Month	Jan	Feb	Mar	Apr	May	Jun	Jul	Aug	Sep	Oct	Nov	Dec	Year
Record high °C (°F)	22.9 (73.2)	29.0 (84.2)	33.0 (91.4)	35.0 (95.0)	36.5 (97.7)	41.9 (107.4)	40.9 (105.6)	42.6 (108.7)	37.5 (99.5)	33.3 (91.9)	28.0 (82.4)	24.0 (75.2)	42.6 (108.7)
Mean daily maximum °C (°F)	11.4 (52.5)	12.4 (54.3)	16.1 (61.0)	17.6 (63.7)	21.8 (71.2)	24.6 (76.3)	26.2 (79.2)	27.0 (80.6)	24.0 (75.2)	19.7 (67.5)	14.4 (57.9)	11.7 (53.1)	18.9 (66.0)
Daily mean °C (°F)	7.2 (45.0)	7.6 (45.7)	10.5 (50.9)	12.0 (53.6)	15.8 (60.4)	18.7 (65.7)	20.4 (68.7)	21.1 (70.0)	18.0 (64.4)	14.8 (58.6)	10.2 (50.4)	7.7 (45.9)	13.7 (56.6)
Mean daily minimum °C (°F)	3.0 (37.4)	2.8 (37.0)	5.0 (41.0)	6.4 (43.5)	9.8 (49.6)	12.8 (55.0)	14.7 (58.5)	15.2 (59.4)	12.1 (53.8)	9.8 (49.6)	5.9 (42.6)	3.8 (38.8)	8.4 (47.2)
Record low °C (°F)	−12.6 (9.3)	−13.0 (8.6)	−8.5 (16.7)	−2.5 (27.5)	1.0 (33.8)	3.0 (37.4)	6.2 (43.2)	3.5 (38.3)	1.0 (33.8)	−1.5 (29.3)	−7.7 (18.1)	−9.7 (14.5)	−13.0 (8.6)
Average precipitation mm (inches)	201.7 (7.94)	172.3 (6.78)	161.1 (6.34)	163.9 (6.45)	138.8 (5.46)	99.7 (3.93)	83.5 (3.29)	74.0 (2.91)	116.6 (4.59)	147.2 (5.80)	237.0 (9.33)	198.3 (7.81)	1,794.1 (70.63)
Average precipitation days (≥ 1.0 mm)	14.5	12.5	12.6	14.9	13.2	10.5	9.3	9.4	10.9	12.1	14.2	13.9	148.0
Source: Meteociel

== Toponymy ==
The commune name in Basque is Banka.

For John-Baptiste Orpustan, the origin of the name Banca can have two interpretations: one lent from the Spanish banco designating the bench on which money was exchanged (which gave the French word banque which gave the English bank) or two from bancs de pierre (stone benches).

The following table details the origins of the commune name and other names in the commune.

Name	Spelling	Date	Source	Page	Origin	Description
Banca	La Fonderie	1750	Cassini			Village
	Lafonderie	1793	Ldh/EHESS/Cassini			
	Banca	1832	Orpustan			
Bihuntzeguiko erreka	Bihuncéguy	1863	Raymond	31		Stream rising in Banca and joining the Nive at Saint-Étienne-de-Baïgorry
Churitcha	Le Col de Churitcha	1863	Raymond	50		Mountain Pass on the Spanish border
Ehuntzaroy	Le Col d'Éhunsaroy	1863	Raymond	58		Mountain Pass on the Spanish border
Elhorietta	Le Col d'Elhoriéta	1863	Raymond	58		Mountain Pass on the Spanish border
Gathuly	Gathuly	1863	Raymond	68		Mountain on the border with Saint-Étienne-de-Baïgorry
Forêt d'Hayra	Hayra	1863	Raymond	76		Forest shared with Urepel
Lindus	Lindux	1863	Raymond	102		Mountain (1220m) on the Spanish border
Meharroztegui	Le Col de Méharoztéguy	1863	Raymond	111		Mountain pass to Aldudes
Mehatzé	Le Col de Méhatcé	1863	Raymond	111		Mountain pass to Spain
Mizpira	Le Col de Mizpira	1863	Raymond	114		Mountain pass to Aldudes
Mizpirachar	Mizpirachar	1863	Raymond	114		Mountain on the Spanish border

Sources:

- Orpustan: Jean-Baptiste Orpustan, New Basque Toponymy
- Cassini: Cassini Map from 1750
- Ldh/EHESS/Cassini: Des villages de Cassini aux communes d'aujourd'hui: Commune data sheet Banca, EHESS (in French).
- Raymond: Topographic Dictionary of the Department of Basses-Pyrenees, 1863, on the page numbers indicated in the table. (in French)

== History ==
Banca owes its origin to the revival in the 18th century of the copper mines which had operated in ancient times. Banca was known as Le Fonderie (The Foundry) until the 19th century" and, under the Ancien Régime, it was a hamlet or district under the parish of Saint-Étienne-de-Baïgorry. It was not made a commune until 1793 under the same name, then in 1874 it was renamed "Banca". The remains of a large forge, a steel foundry started in 1828 on the site of the former copper smelter, stands at the entrance of the village on the banks of the Nive des Aldudes. The most visible element is a blast furnace in good condition.

The first armed action by Iparretarrak took place in Banca on 11 December 1973.

== Administration ==
List of Successive Mayors

From	To	Name
1995	2001	Gratien Arambel
2001	2008	Dominique Etcheverry
2008	2026	Michel Oçafrain

=== Inter-communality ===
The commune is part of four inter-communal structures:

- the Communauté d'agglomération du Pays Basque;
- the inter-communal association for the development and management of the slaughterhouse in Saint-Jean-Pied-de-Port;
- the association to support Basque culture.
- the joint association for the drainage basin of the Nive;

== Demography ==
The inhabitants of the commune are known as Bankars.

Historical population

Year	Pop.	±% p.a.
1793	803	—
1800	590	−4.31%
1806	999	+9.17%
1821	1,068	+0.45%
1831	1,419	+2.88%
1836	1,280	−2.04%
1841	1,429	+2.23%
1846	1,309	−1.74%
1851	1,327	+0.27%
1856	1,064	−4.32%
1861	1,069	+0.09%
1866	1,020	−0.93%
1872	1,020	+0.00%
1876	1,027	+0.17%
1881	952	−1.51%
1886	944	−0.17%
1891	872	−1.57%
1896	828	−1.03%
1901	829	+0.02%

Year	Pop.	±% p.a.
1906	833	+0.10%
1911	815	−0.44%
1921	800	−0.19%
1926	770	−0.76%
1931	780	+0.26%
1936	748	−0.83%
1946	735	−0.18%
1954	799	+1.05%
1962	672	−2.14%
1968	634	−0.97%
1975	524	−2.69%
1982	450	−2.15%
1990	426	−0.68%
1999	373	−1.47%
2007	348	−0.86%
2012	332	−0.94%
2017	346	+0.83%
2023	358	+0.57%

Source: EHESS and INSEE

== Economy ==
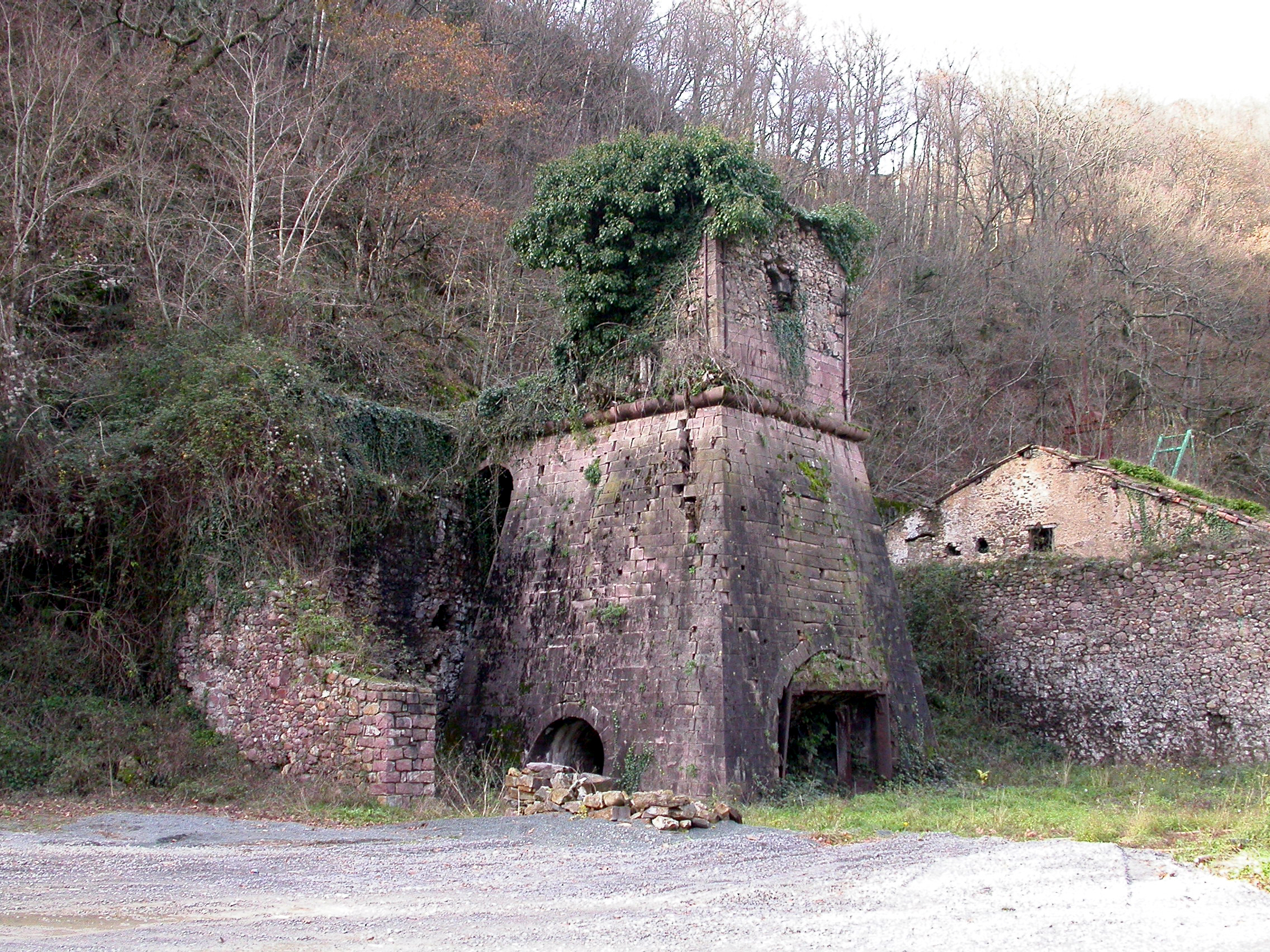
The Banca Mine

The copper/silver mines and the associated smelter reached their peak in the middle of the 18th century and the forge, with its blast furnace, was in operation from 1828 to 1861.

Economic activity is now mainly agricultural. The town is part of the Appellation d'origine contrôlée (AOC) zone of Ossau-iraty.

== Culture and heritage ==
=== Civil heritage ===
The commune has a number of buildings and structures that are registered as historical monuments:

- The Banca Mine on D948 (19th century). These remains are at the northern entrance of the village including a blast furnace. The supply canal is fed by the waters of the Nive captured upstream and turn a wheel of a blower machine which injected air at the base of the blast furnace through two nozzles. The adjacent building, still dominated by the canal, housed the forge fires and hammers to make cast iron and a splitting mill for splitting iron bars.
- Houses and Farms (19th century)
- The Redoubt of Lindus (1813). This redoubt was used during the Franco-Spanish War 1813–1814.
- The Gorria Farmhouse (now a Stable) (18th century)
- The Gixonaenea Farmhouse (1808)
- The Xangala Farmhouse (19th century)

=== Religious heritage ===
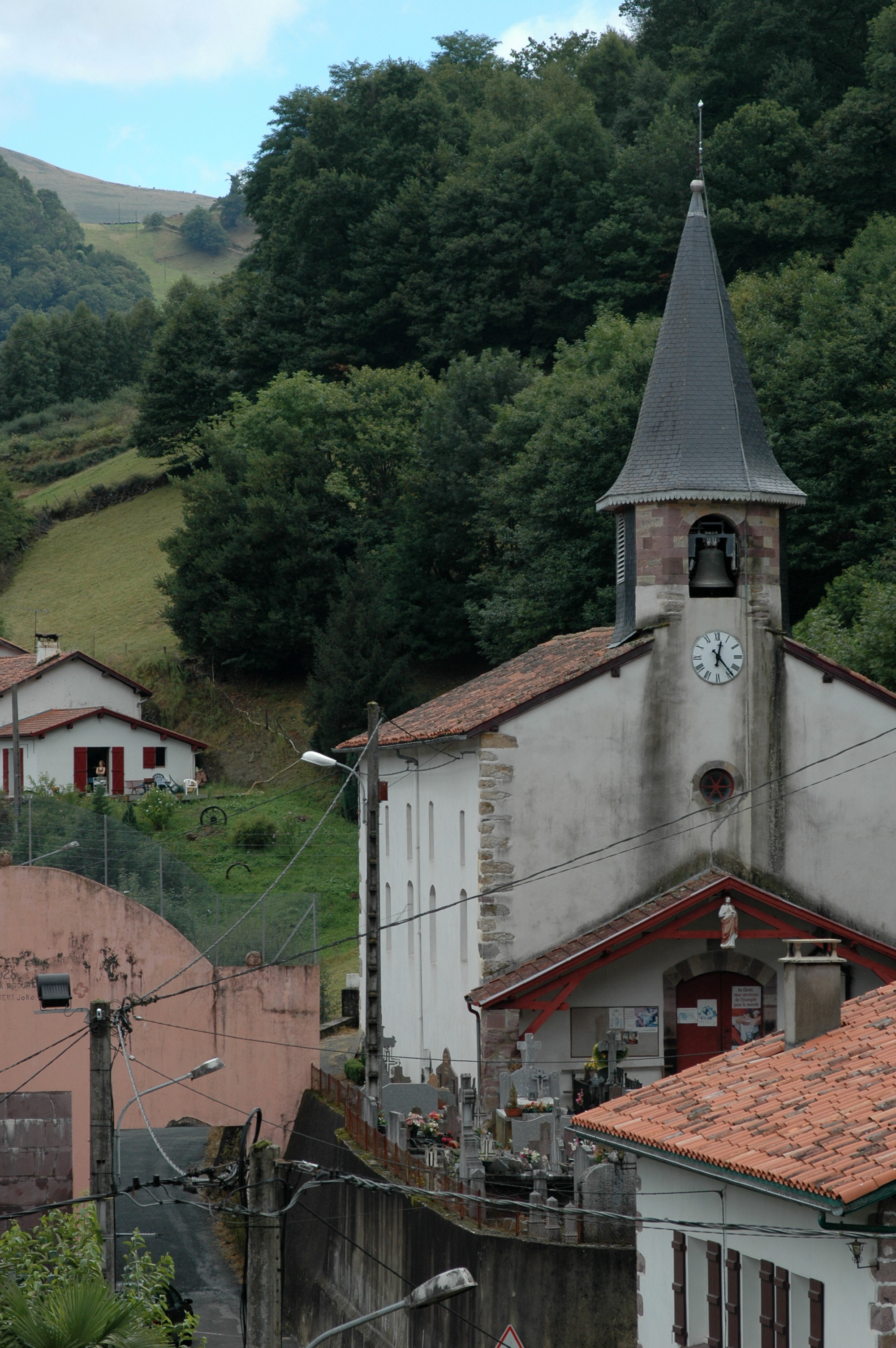
The Parish Church of Saint Peter.

- The Parish Church of Saint Peter (19th century) is registered as an historical monument.

=== Environmental heritage ===
- The Petechanea Gallery (0.1 hectares) is one of the locations of the regional conservatory of natural areas of the Pyrenees.
- Mountain Peaks
  - Mount Harrigorry 806 m
  - Munhogain 853 m
  - Otsamunho 901 m
  - Errola 908 m
  - Abraku 1003 m
  - Ichtauz 1024 m
  - Antchola 1119 m
  - Mehatzé 1209 m
  - Lindus 1220 m
  - Mendimotcha 1224 m
  - Aurigna 1278 m

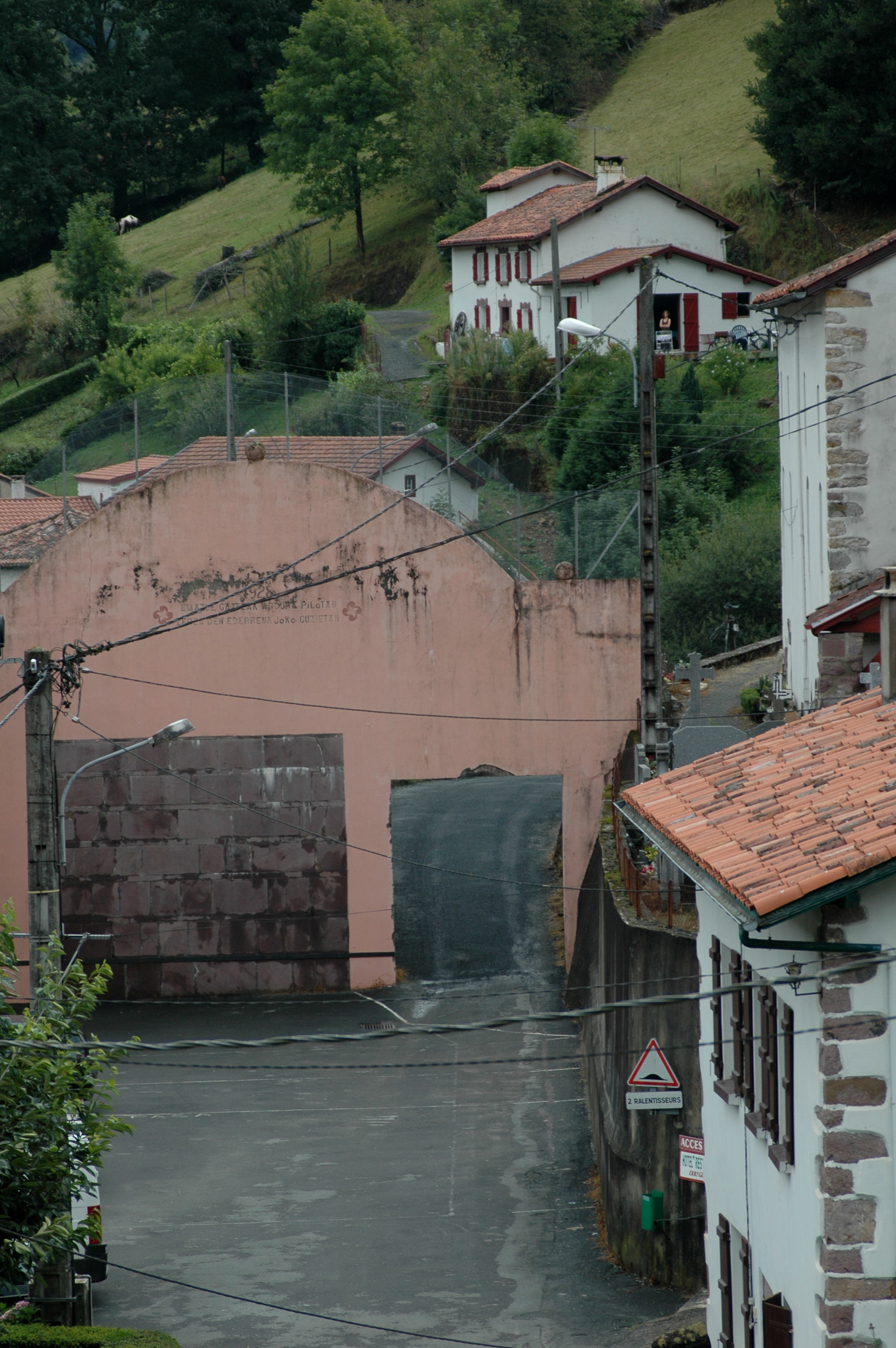
The Fronton.

== Facilities ==
=== Education ===
The commune has a primary school.

=== Sports ===
There is a Fronton traversed by a road.

== See also ==
- Communes of the Pyrénées-Atlantiques department

== Bibliography ==
- Mines and Metallurgical Establishments of Banca, dir. P. Machot, J&D, Biarritz, Izpegi, Saint-Étienne-de-Baïgorry, 1995, 306 p. (in French)
- Pierre Machot and Gilles Parent, "Mines and Metallurgy in the Valley of Baïgorry", in The Valley of Baïgorry, Éditions Izpegi, reprinted in 2002 (in French)
- Gilles Parent, "The handiwork of the Copper Foundry of Banca in the 18th century" in Revue d'Histoire Industrielle des Pyrénées Occidentales, No. 2, 2007, p. 143–222, Éditions Izpegi (in French)
