= Urepel =

Urepel Urepele (Basque)
- Commune
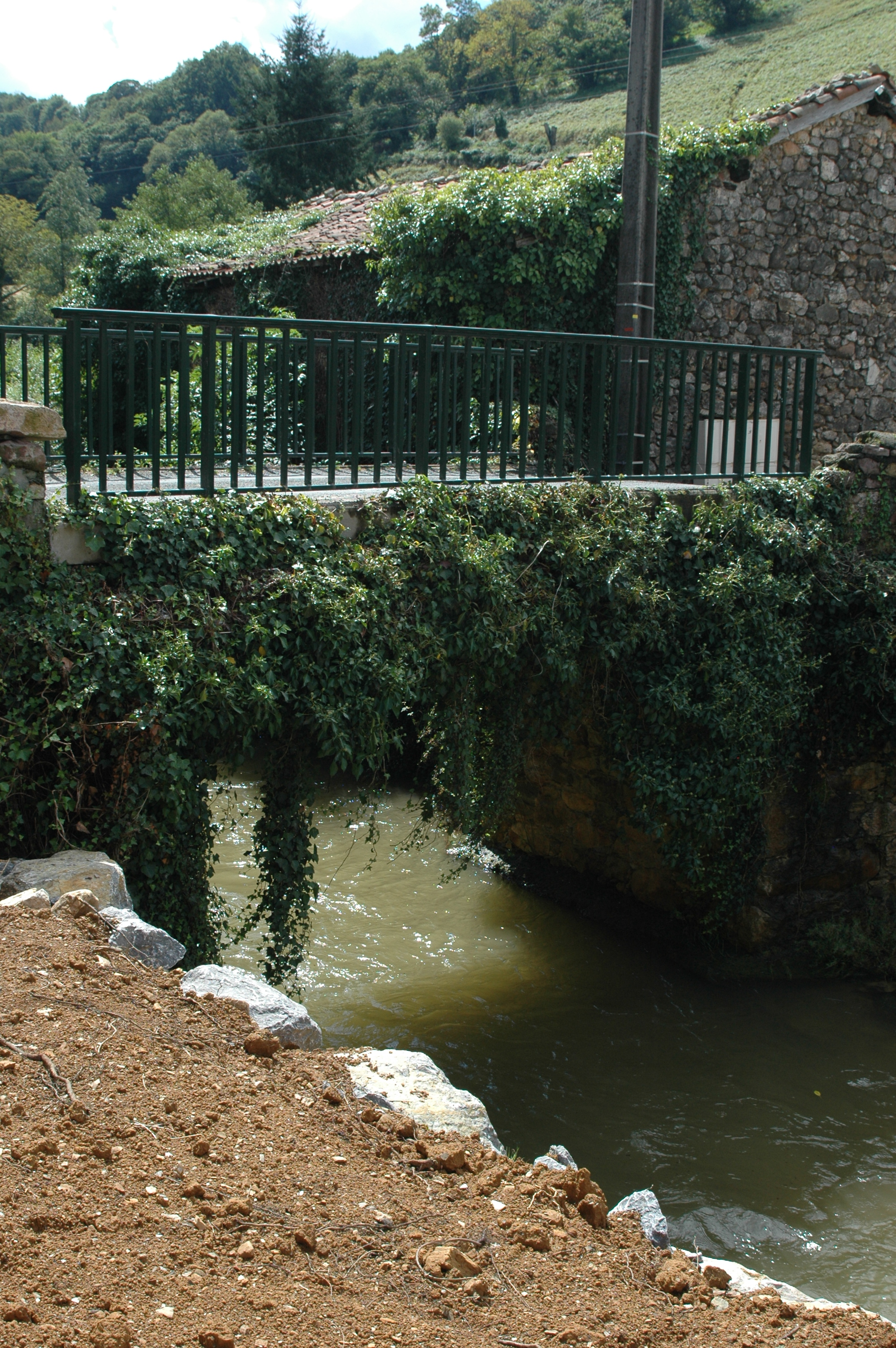
- Bridge over the Nive des Aldudes

- Coat of arms
- Location of Urepel
- Location within France Location within Nouvelle-Aquitaine
- Coordinates: 43°04′15″N 1°24′54″W
- Country: France
- Region: Nouvelle-Aquitaine
- Department: Pyrénées-Atlantiques
- Arrondissement: Bayonne
- Canton: Montagne Basque
- Intercommunality: CA Pays Basque

Government
  - Mayor (2020–2026): Xole Aire
- Area^{1}: 26.44 km^{2} (10.21 sq mi)
- Highest elevation: 1,150 m (3,770 ft)
- Lowest elevation: 392 m (1,286 ft)
- Population (2023): 271
  - Density: 10.2/km^{2} (26.5/sq mi)
- Time zone: UTC+01:00 (CET)
  - Summer (DST): UTC+02:00 (CEST)
- INSEE/Postal code: 64543 /64430
- ^{1} French Land Register data, which excludes lakes, ponds, glaciers > 1 km^{2} (0.386 sq mi or 247 acres) and river estuaries.

Urepel (French pronunciation: [yʁpɛl]; Occitan: Urepèl; Basque: Urepele) is a commune in the Pyrénées-Atlantiques department in south-western France.

It is located in the Basque former province of Lower Navarre.

== See also ==
- Communes of the Pyrénées-Atlantiques department
