= LWV =

LWV may refer to:

- League of Women Voters
- Lehr und Wehr Verein, a Chicago-based socialist military organization founded in 1875
- Lawrenceville–Vincennes International Airport's IATA code
- Lully-Werke-Verzeichnis, the prefix for numbering compositions by Jean-Baptiste Lully
