= Jubilate Deo omnis terra =

Motet by Jean-Baptiste Lully

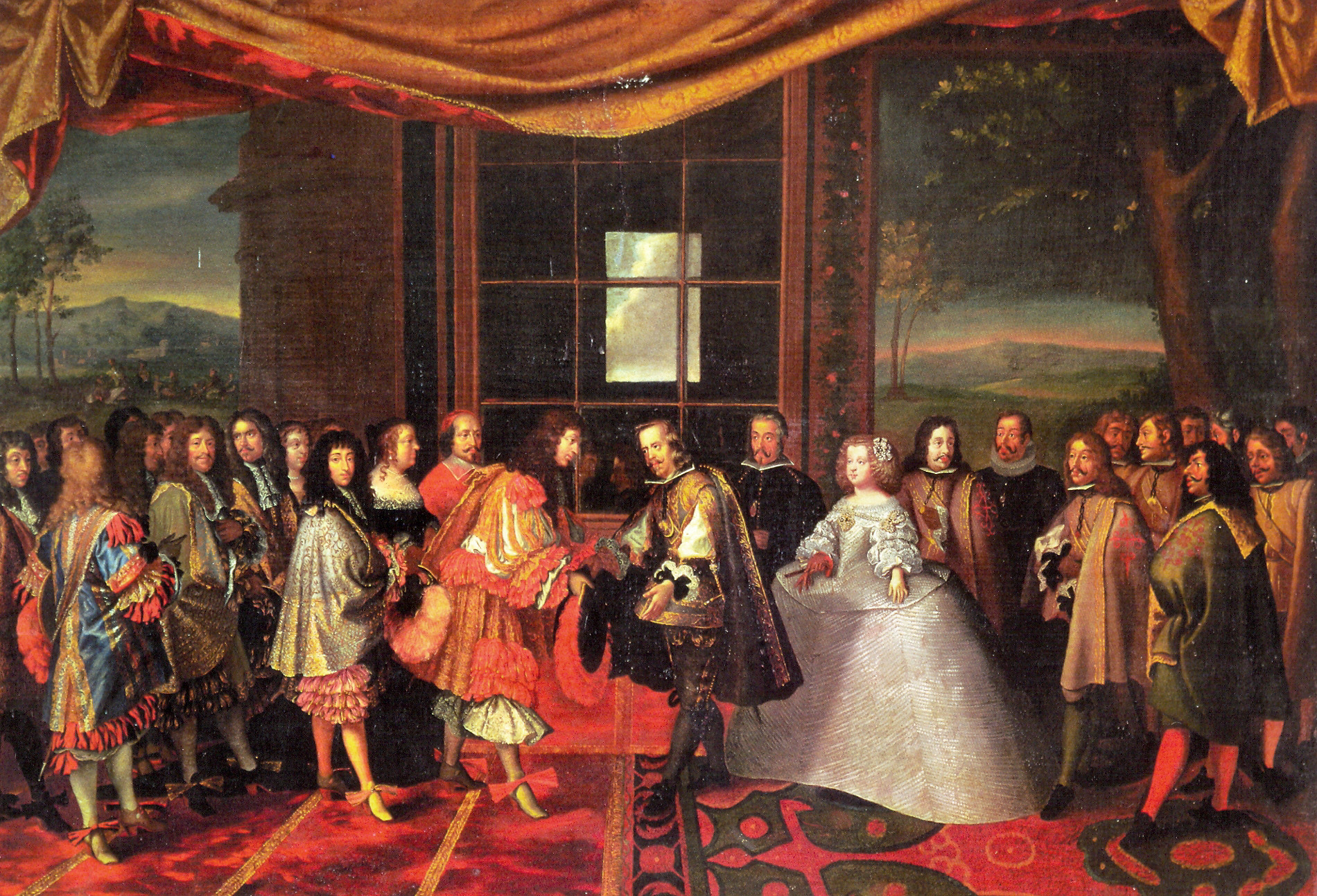
Louis XIV and Philip IV of Spain at the Meeting on the Isle of Pheasants, June 1660

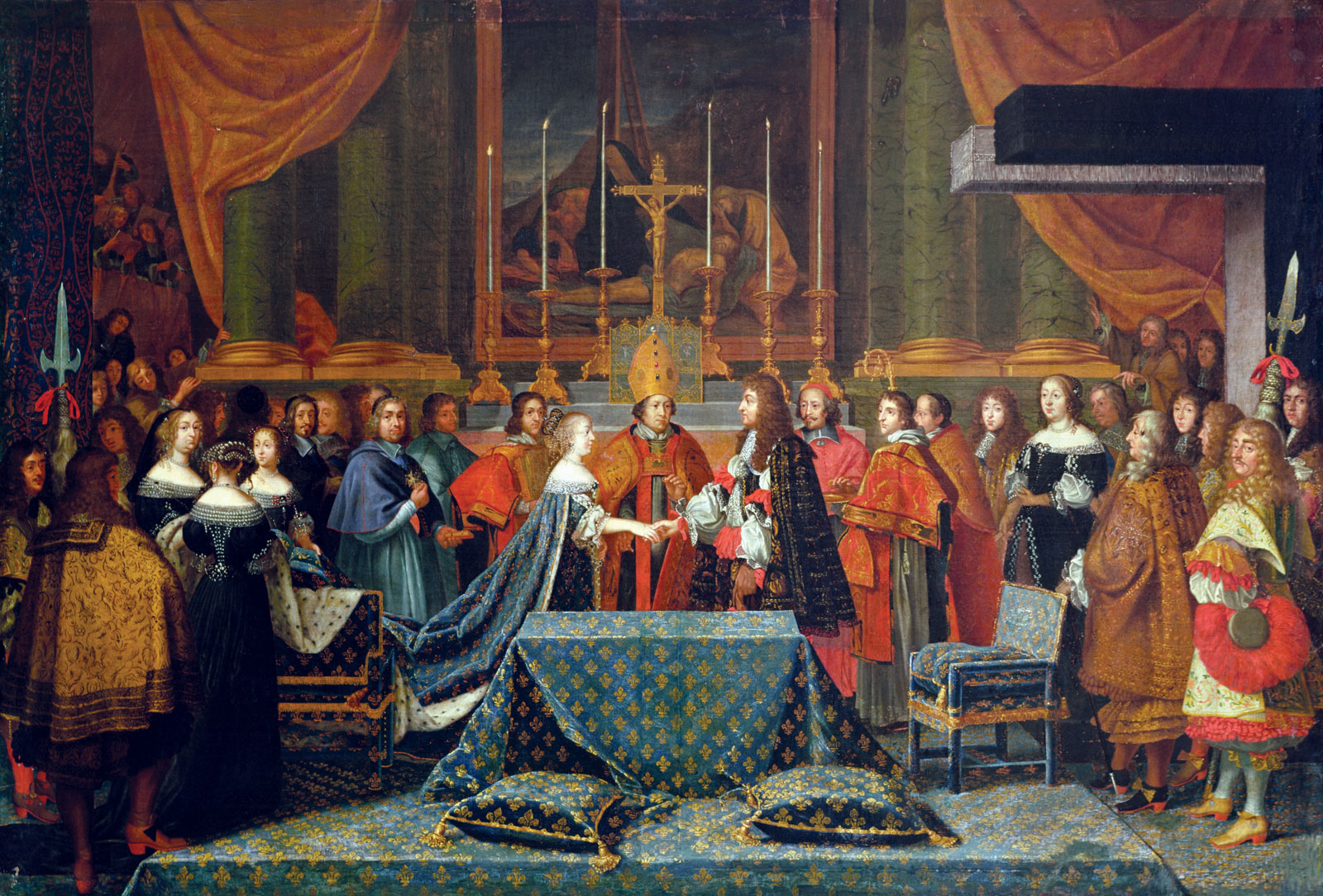
Wedding of Louis XIV and Maria Theresa

Jubilate Deo omnis terra ('Rejoice to God of All the Earth', LWV 77/16) is a motet by Jean-Baptiste Lully set on biblical text. Written to both celebrate the new treaty and to celebrate the wedding of Louis XIV of France and Maria Theresa of Spain on 29 August 1660 at the l'église de la Mercy.

== History ==
Lully's first grand motet was composed primarily for the Louis XIV's wedding and as well as the celebration of Treaty of the Pyrenees (1659). Text is based on twelve psalms.

== Text ==
Latin
Jubilate Deo omnis terra (Ps 98,4 and Ps 66,1)
cantate et exultate et psallite. (Ps 98,5)
Reges terrae et omnes populi, principes et omnes iudices (Ps 148,11)
Annunciate inter gentes gloriam eius. (Ps 95,3)
Qui porsuit fines nostras pacem (Ps 147,3)
In manu eius sunt omnes fines terrae. (Ps 94,4)
Facta est pax in virtute sua, et abundantia in turribus suis. (Ps 122,7)
Arcum conterit, confrigit arma et scuta cumburit igni. (Ps 46,10)
Lux orta est iusto, et restis corde laetitia. (Ps 97,11)
Jubilate Deo omnis terra, cantate et exultate et psallite (Ps 98,4-5)
Arcum conterit, confrigit arma et scuta cumburit igni. (Ps 46,10)
Taliter non fecit omni nationi. (Ps 147,20)
In die malorum protexit nos. (Ps 27,5a)

== See also ==
- List of compositions by Jean-Baptiste Lully
