= Meeting on the Isle of Pheasants =

1660 event involving France and Spain

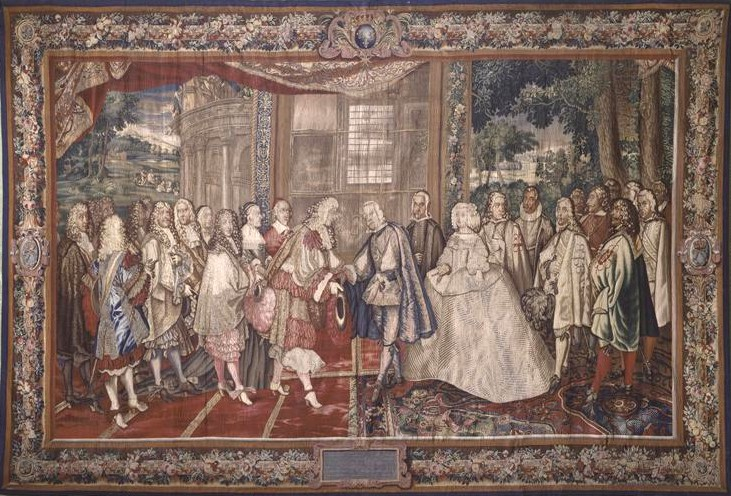
Tapestry in the French Embassy in Madrid

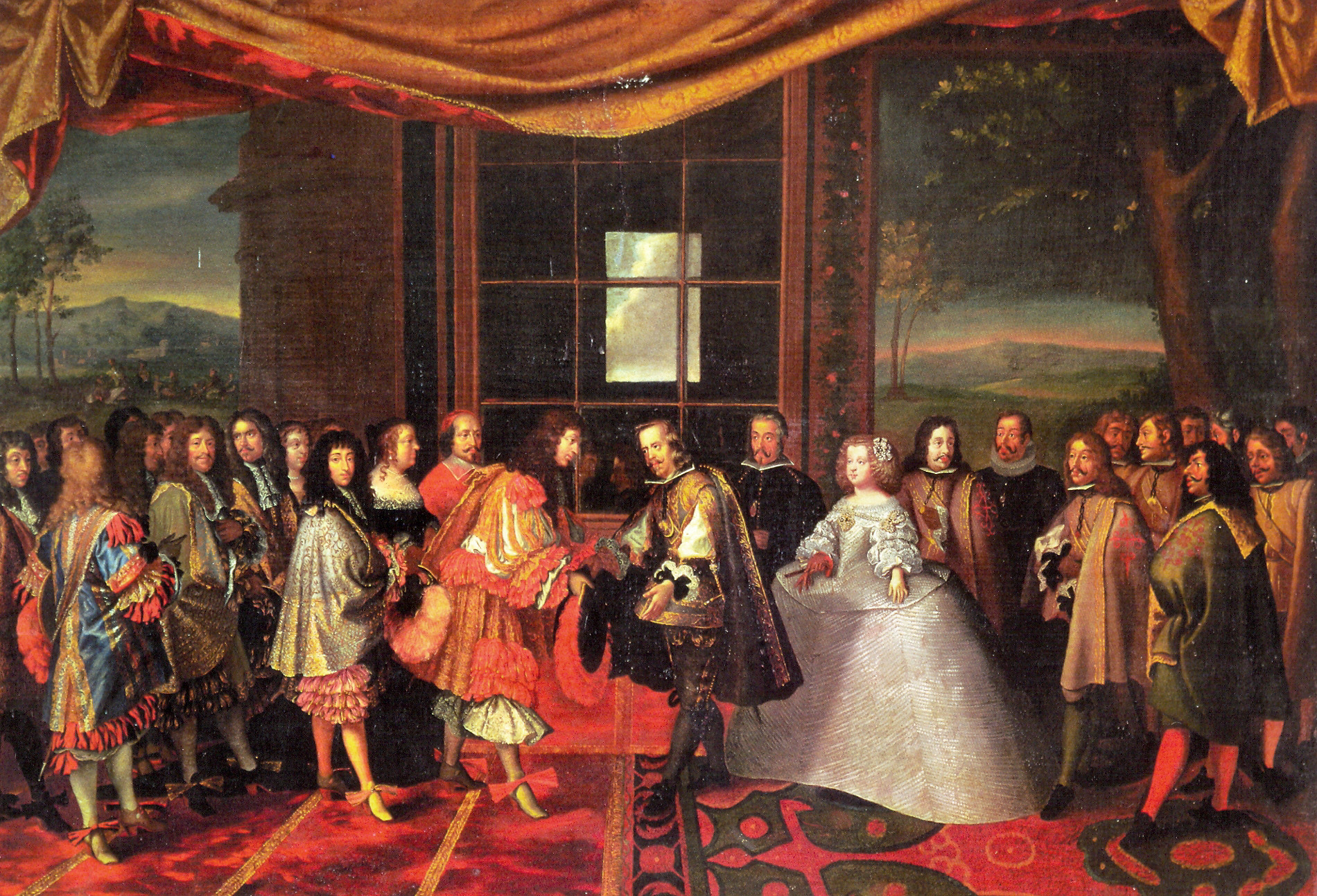
L'entrevue des deux rois sur l'île des Faisans de 1660, a later copy painted by Jacques Laumosnier

The Meeting on the Isle of Pheasants on 7 June 1660 was part of the process ending the Franco-Spanish War (1635–1659); the Spanish princess Maria Theresa of Spain entered France for her marriage to Louis XIV, and said goodbye to her father Philip IV of Spain and much of the Spanish court. This had been agreed at an earlier meeting on the island, on 7 November 1659, which saw the signing of the Treaty of the Pyrenees by the chief ministers. Pheasant Island lies on the River Bidasoa that is still the border between France and Spain, and the tiny island remains joint territory to this day.

== Representatives of Spain and France ==
Those present included, from Spain: Maria Theresa; the Count-Duke of Olivares, chief minister, as well as one of the organisers of the meeting; and the painter Diego Velázquez, who was then sixty years of age. Such grand meetings between reigning monarchs had become increasingly rare in the 17th century.

On the French side, there was the widowed queen Anne of Austria, sister of King Philip and mother of Louis XIV, Philippe I, Duke of Orléans and Cardinal Mazarin, the chief minister.

== Depiction in tapestry ==
The meeting was later (by about 1660) depicted in a tapestry in a series on the life of Louis XIV, designed by Charles Le Brun, an example of which is in the Palace of Versailles. Another set of copies of this is now in the French Embassy in Madrid. This composition was later copied in oils by Jacques Laumosnier (Musée de Tessé, Le Mans).
