= Pheasant Island =

Uninhabited island between France and Spain

Coordinates: 43°20′34″N 1°45′56″W

Île des Faisans (French) Isla de los Faisanes (Spanish) Konpantzia (Basque)
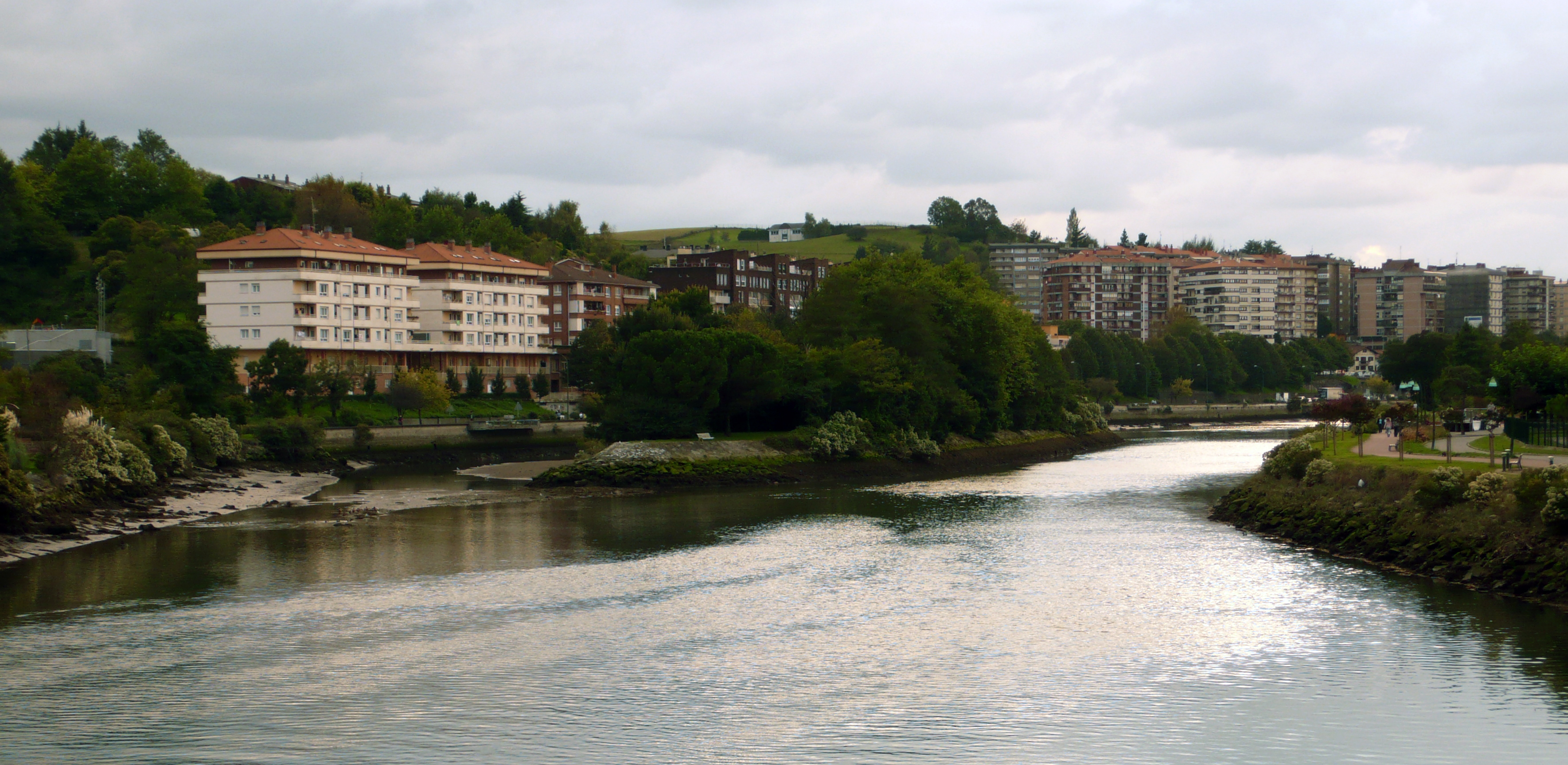
- Pheasant Island (center) from the International Bridge over the Bidasoa river. On the left Irun, Spain; on the right Hendaye, France
- Interactive map of Pheasant Island

Geography
- Location: Bidasoa
- Area: 0.682 ha (1.69 acres)
- Highest elevation: 6 m (20 ft)

Administration
- Current: France
- Region: Nouvelle-Aquitaine
- Department: Pyrénées-Atlantiques
- Spain
- Autonomous community: Basque Country
- Province: Gipuzkoa

Demographics
- Population: 0

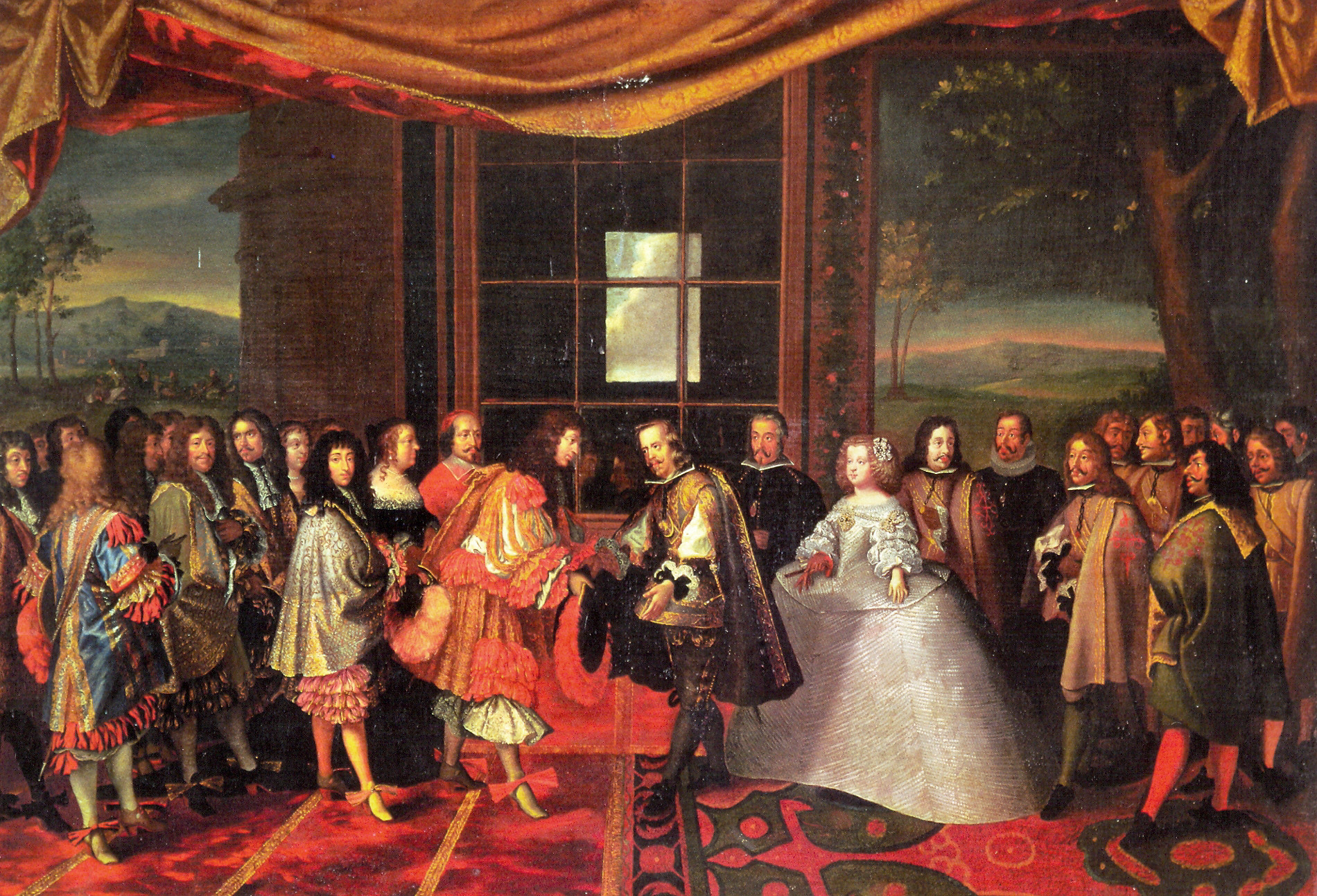
Louis XIV of France and Philip IV of Spain meeting on Pheasant Island for the Treaty of the Pyrenees.

Pheasant Island (French: Île des Faisans/Île de la Conférence, Spanish: Isla de los Faisanes, Basque: Konpantzia, Faisaien Uhartea Konferentziako Uhartea, Faisaien Irla) is an uninhabited river island located in the Bidasoa river, located between France and Spain, whose administration alternates between the two nations every six months.

Currently, Pheasant Island is part of France until February 1st.

- It is administered by France from 1 August to 31 January.
- It is administered by Spain from 1 February to 31 July.

== Etymology ==
There are no pheasants on the island. The name could be a misinterpretation of some French word related to "passing" or "toll".

== History ==
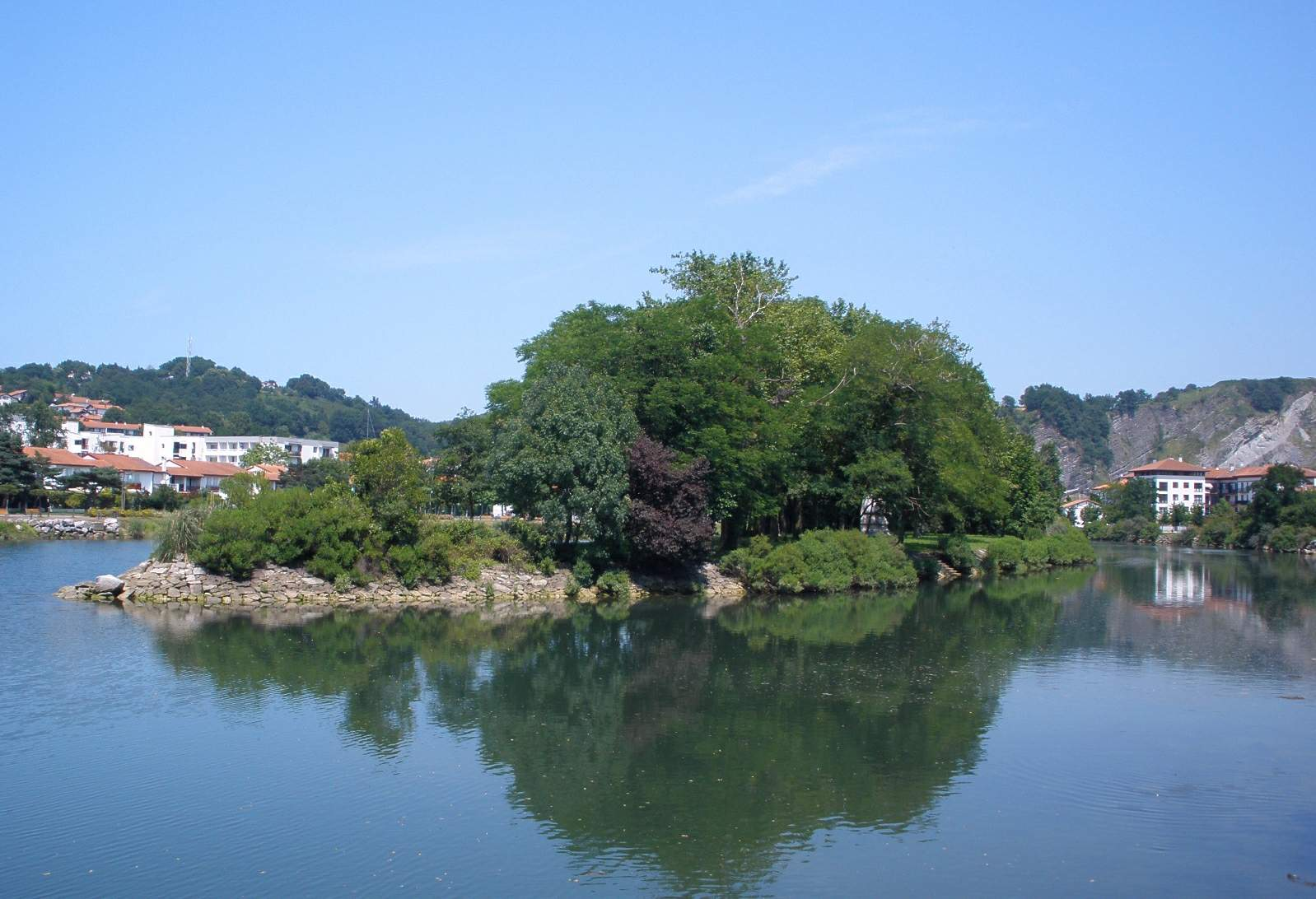
The island as seen from the Spanish side

The most important historical event to have taken place on the island was the signing of the Treaty of the Pyrenees. This was the climax to a series of 24 conferences held between Luis Méndez de Haro, a grandee of Spain, and Cardinal Mazarin, Chief Minister of France, in 1659 following the end of the Thirty Years' War. A monolith was built in the centre of the island to commemorate the meeting.

The island has also been used for several other royal meetings:

- 1659 – Louis XIV met his future wife Maria Theresa of Spain (1638–1683); they were the parents of Louis, Grand Dauphin; a year later – at the Meeting on the Isle of Pheasants – she said farewell to her father, Philip IV of Spain and much of the Spanish court, before crossing into France to become the consort of Louis XIV.
- 1721 – Louis XV met his intended bride Mariana Victoria of Spain (1718–1781). The two never married; Louis instead married Marie Leszczyńska, while Mariana married the future Joseph I of Portugal.

According to the terms of the Treaty of the Pyrenees, the island would remain a condominium.

== Political status ==
The island is a condominium, the world's smallest, under joint sovereignty of Spain and France; for alternating periods of six months, it is officially under the governance of the naval commander of Hondarribia, Spain (1 February – 31 July) and of a French viceroy (1 August – 31 January).

Currently, the French position of "deputy director for the sea and coast of the Atlantic Pyrenees and Landes departments" carries the title of "viceroy of Pheasant Island", an unusual name in the French Republic. One of the French officers with this title was Julien Viaud, better known as the writer Pierre Loti. In practice, it is administered in turn by the mayors of Irun (in Gipuzkoa, Spain) and Hendaye (in the Pyrénées-Atlantiques, France).

== Geography ==
As of January 2018, the island was approximately 200 metres (660 ft) long and 40 metres (130 ft) wide, and it was eroding.

Since the Franco-Spanish boundary line follows the thalweg of the Bidasoa river's main course, which is located on the northern shore of the islet, the whole territory of Pheasant Island is an enclave located within the borders of Spain.

== Access ==
The island can sometimes be reached on foot from the Spanish side at low tide. It is uninhabited, and access is forbidden, except very occasionally on heritage open days. Other than that, employees of the municipal government of Irun or Hendaye may access the island once every six months for cleaning and gardening, and members of the Naval Commands of San Sebastián (Spain) and Bayonne (France), responsible for monitoring the island, land on it every five days.

== See also ==
- Bidasoa River
- France–Spain border
- List of islands of France
- List of islands of Spain
- List of uninhabited regions
