= Aldudes =

Aldudes Aldude
- Commune
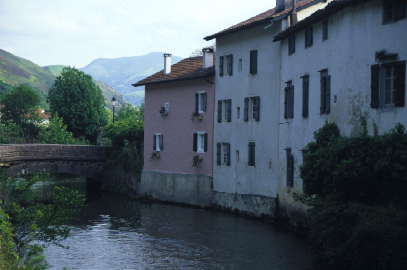
- Nive River

- Coat of arms
- Location of Aldudes
- Location within France Location within Nouvelle-Aquitaine
- Coordinates: 43°05′49″N 1°25′28″W
- Country: France
- Region: Nouvelle-Aquitaine
- Department: Pyrénées-Atlantiques
- Arrondissement: Bayonne
- Canton: Montagne Basque
- Intercommunality: Pays Basque

Government
  - Mayor (2020–2026): Martin Suquilbide
- Area^{1}: 23.27 km^{2} (8.98 sq mi)
- Elevation: 485 m (1,591 ft)
- Highest elevation: 1,000 m (3,300 ft)
- Lowest elevation: 345 m (1,132 ft)
- Population (2023): 332
  - Density: 14.3/km^{2} (37.0/sq mi)
- Time zone: UTC+01:00 (CET)
  - Summer (DST): UTC+02:00 (CEST)
- INSEE/Postal code: 64016 /64430
- ^{1} French Land Register data, which excludes lakes, ponds, glaciers > 1 km^{2} (0.386 sq mi or 247 acres) and river estuaries.

Aldudes (French pronunciation: [aldyd]; Occitan: Aldudas; Basque: Aldude) is a commune in the Pyrénées-Atlantiques department in the Nouvelle-Aquitaine region in southwestern France.

It is located in the former province of Lower Navarre in the Basque Country.

== Geography ==
=== Location ===
The village Aldudes is part of Le Pays Quint (Kintoa in Basque or Quinto Real in Spanish). The commune is an area of pasture belonging to Spain but cultivated by French farmers.

It is located in the Aldudes valley on the banks of the Nive des Aldudes in the Basque province of Lower Navarre. It is on the Spanish border some 20 km southwest of Saint-Jean-Pied-de-Port although it can not be directly accessed from there.

=== Access ===
Access is by the D948 road from Saint-Etienne-de-Baigorry in the north, which passes through the village then continues south to Urepel. The D58 road goes from the village through the length of the commune before continuing to Spain through Urepel commune. The Spanish border of Navarre forms the southwestern and northeastern borders of the commune.

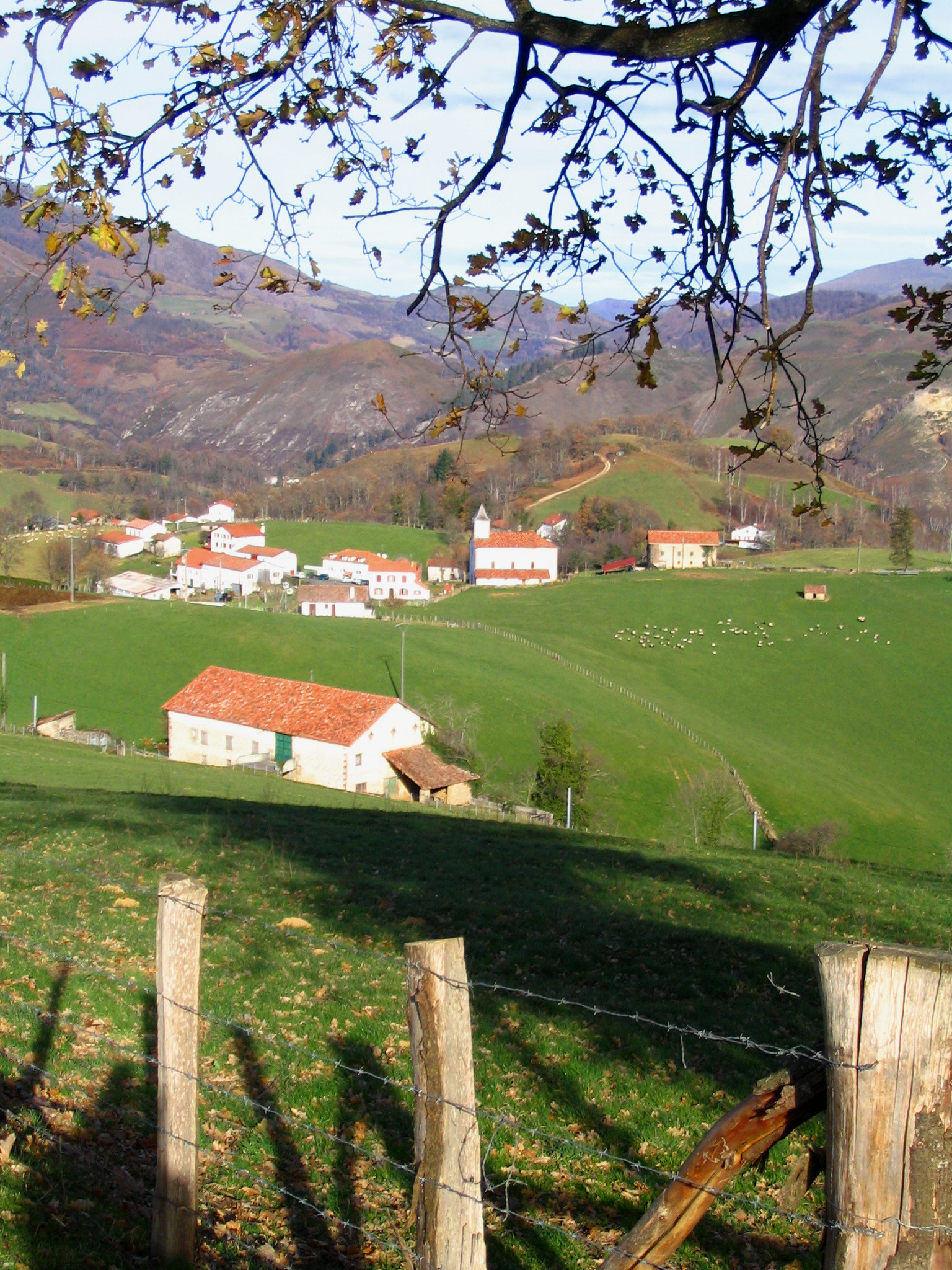
The village of Esnazu.

=== Hydrography ===
Located in the watershed of the Adour, Aldudes is traversed by the Nive d'Aldudes with its many tributaries, such as the Urbeltch Labiaringo erreka, the Aktieltako erreka, and numerous unnamed streams. Paul Raymond mentioned the Autrin, a stream which rises in Aldudes and joins the Nive des Aldudes.

=== Localities and hamlets ===
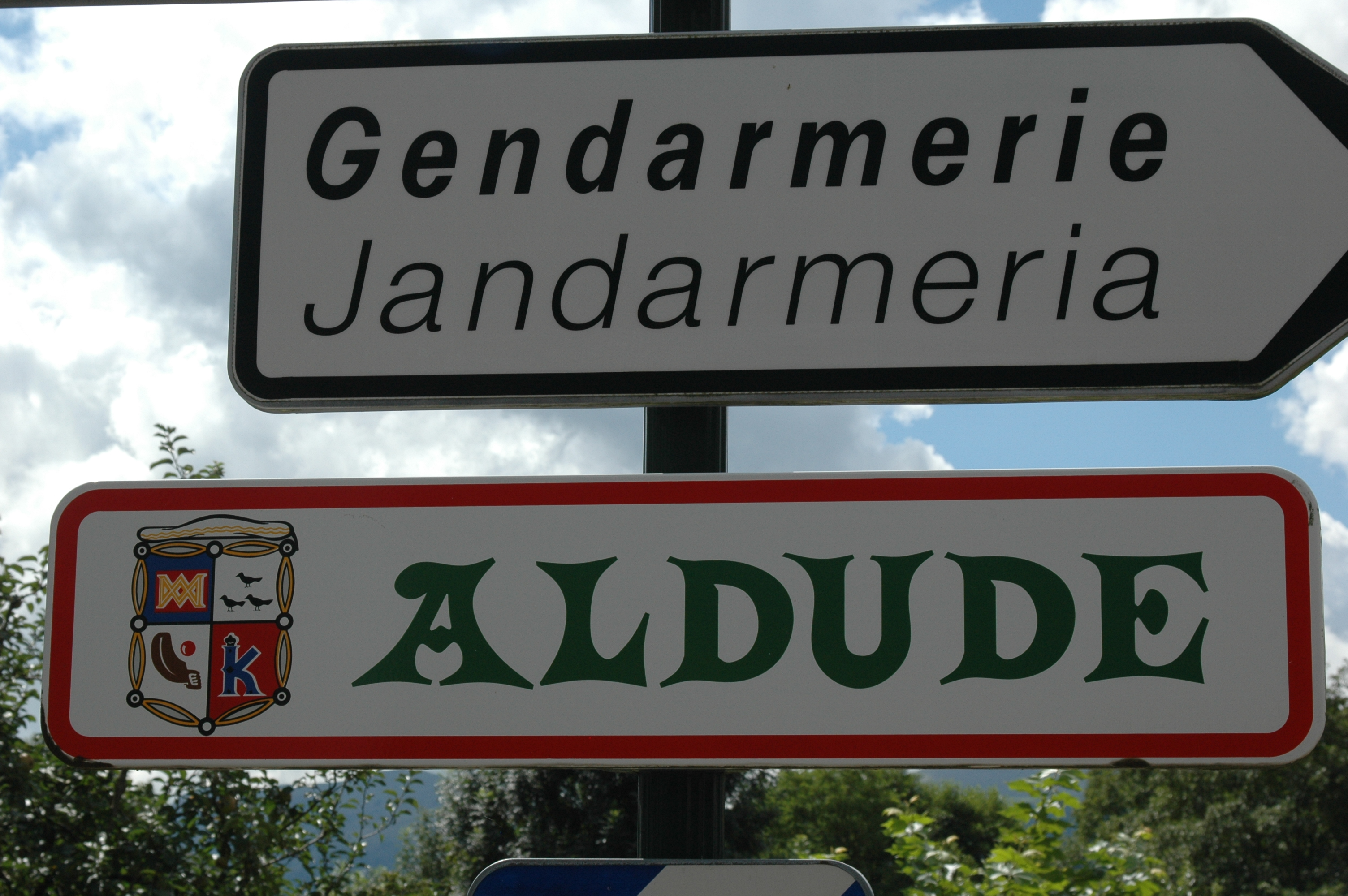
Aldude sign

- Abanjo
- Abrakou
- Achtieta
- Aguerréa
- Ahadilépo
- Alachontro
- Alamontcho
- Alasta
- Alastagaraya
- Ametzlépo
- Antonénéa
- Aranbelea
- Arrokia
- Asketa
- Atabala
- Aucho
- Autrin
- Auzkia
- Barbachuri
- Baztanchuria
- Behorsubuztan
- Berha
- Bidartea
- Chabadinénéa
- Chalosa
- Chekalebeherea
- Chekalegaraya
- Chiloénéa
- Chotro
- Chotroenborda
- Domingoénéa
- Egnauténéa
- Elgartéa
- Elhocady
- Elichaga
- Erremedio
- Errienta
- Esnazu (or Eznazu, or Esnaratsu on the Cassini Map)
- Etcheberria
- Etchemendia
- Ferranjagaraya
- Hachketa
- Haritzchilo
- Harribeltzia
- Iguxkagerrea (or Iguchkaguerrea)
- Joanessénéa
- Joangnakei
- Koche
- Koskartéa
- Koskarteko Borda
- Koskorziloa
- Landart
- Lechaka
- Lekuederra (or Lekuederrea)
- Col de Lepeder
- Luichénéa
- Mahatcheta
- Makurea
- Manechuna
- Marquitchaénéa
- Martinénéa
- Mate
- Meharroztegui (Pass, 738m))
- Menementa
- Miguelartzaina
- Miguelénéa
- Munichta
- Munichtagaraya
- Murruoin
- Nobléa
- Oliopitchar
- Otsachar
- Ohhanburua
- Otsanhaitz
- Oyhanzelhaya
- Paratzelhaï
- Patchiko
- Pilaria
- Pocomotzénéa
- Poko
- Le Pont Romain
- Predotinéa
- Premundoa
- Pritchia
- Sabina
- Salaria
- Sallaberria
- Sarahandia
- Sarahandiko Ithurria
- Sarkindéa
- Semeder
- Soldadoénéa
- Ttattola
- Turrieta
- Uhaldéa
- Urrichka
- Zelhaybeguia

== Toponymy ==
The name of the commune in Basque is Aldude. Aldudes was also the name given to the entire valley bordering the Baïgorry Valley and the Spanish border.

Jean-Baptiste Orpustan proposes the construction ald(a)-uhide meaning "the path beside the water". According to Ernest Nègre however, the name Aldudes is a contraction of the basque Aldubide meaning "way to the summits" from the root aldu meaning "heights" and bide meaning "way". The romanisation into Aldudes is actually a plural.

The following table details the origins of the commune name and other names in the commune.

Name	Spelling	Date	Source	Page	Origin	Description
Aldudes	Alduide	1193	Orpustan			Village
	Montes de alduides	1237	Mérimée			
	Aldude	1353	Mérimée			
	Alduyde	1374	Mérimée			
	Alduyde	1381	Orpustan			
	Alduyde	1392	Orpustan			
	Alduide	1614	Raymond	4	Camara	
	Les Aldudes	1863	Raymond	4		
Elhocady	Elhocady	1863	Raymond	58		Redoubt on the Spanish border
Esnazu	Eznazu	1863	Raymond	64		Hamlet
Le Labiarine	Le Labiarine	1863	Raymond	87		Hamlet
Lepeder	Lépéder	1863	Raymond	99		Mountain
Col de Meharroztegui	Col de Méharoztéguy	1863	Raymond	111		Pass
Col de Phaaçaldéguy	Col de Phaaçaldéguy	1863	Raymond	135		Pass to Spain
Col d’Urtiague	Col d’Urtiague	1863	Raymond	172		Pass to Spain

Sources:

- Orpustan: Jean-Baptiste Orpustan, New Basque Toponymy
- Mérimée: Ministry of Culture Mérimée database: Presentation of the Commune),
- Raymond: Topographic Dictionary of the Department of Basses-Pyrenees, 1863, on the page numbers indicated in the table. (in French)

Origins: Camara: Titles of Camara de Comptos

== History ==
The commune originated in the 16th century when young noblemen of the Baigory family founded the village which, by the ancient Basque succession rule, reserved the legacy of the family house exclusively to the eldest child. The parish was established in 1793.

=== Heraldry ===
Arms of Aldudes	Blazon: Quarterly, first of gules bordered in Or charged with the monogram of the Virgin surmounted by a small cross the same all bordered in azure; second argent 3 wood-pigeons azure 2 and 1; third Or a Lachua glove posed in bend accompanied in sinister chief by a palote the whole proper; fourth gules a majuscule letter K of argent surmounted by a royal crown of Or.

== Administration ==
List of Successive Mayors

From	To	Name
1801	1808	Jean Tihista
1808	1815	Jean Ardantz
1815	1816	Jean Uhide
1816	1829	Martin Arrambide
1829	1831	Charles Schmarzow
1831	1833	Salvat Larre
1833	1839	Mathieu Barcelona
1839	1848	Charles Schmarzow
1848	1860	Pierre Mococain
1860	1862	Alfred Saurel
1862	1871	Étienne Ritou
1995	2014	Perio Setoain
2014	2020	Jean-Michel Dendarieta
2020	2026	Martin Suquilbide

=== Inter-communality ===
The commune of Aldudes participates in five intercommunal organisations:

- the Communauté d'agglomération du Pays Basque
- the intercommunal association for the development and management of the slaughterhouse of Saint-Jean-Pied-de-Port
- the joint association of the watershed of the Nive
- the association to support Basque culture
- the energy association of Pyrénées-Atlantiques

== Population ==
The inhabitants of the commune are known as Aldulais in French.

Historical population
Year	Pop.	±% p.a.
1968	718	—
1975	586	−2.86%
1982	483	−2.72%
1990	433	−1.36%
1999	395	−1.02%
2007	376	−0.61%
2012	338	−2.11%
2017	322	−0.97%
2023	332	+0.51%
Source: INSEE

== Economy ==
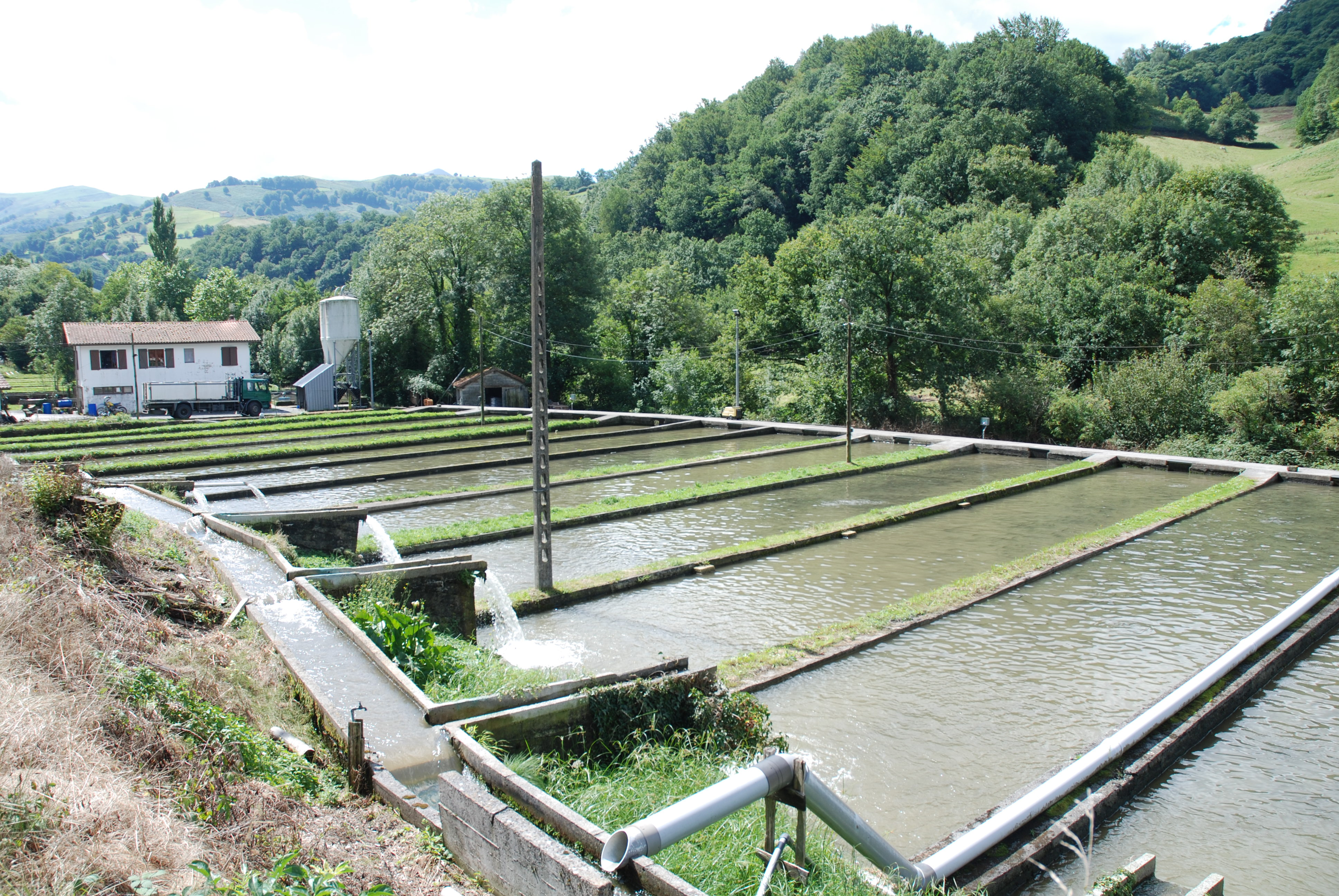
Fish Farm

A fish farm is active on the road to Urepel.

Basque pig breeding is an activity in full revival in the Aldudes valley, under the leadership of the Technical Institute of Pork (ITP).

The commune hosts the Ets Pierre Oteiza company (gourmet pork products) which is one of the fifty top agribusinesses in the department.

It is part of the Appellation d'origine contrôlée (AOC) zone of Ossau-iraty.

== Culture and heritage ==
=== Languages ===
According to the Map of the Seven Basque Provinces, published in 1863 by Prince Louis-Lucien Bonaparte, the dialect of Basque spoken in Aldudes is western Lower Navarrese dialect.

=== Laxoa ===
In 1952 the square in front of the church and the town hall was converted into a playing field for "laxoa". This ancient game of basque pelote is played with leather gloves.

At the entrance porch of the church is the target for the game.

=== Civil heritage ===
The commune contains a number of sites that are registered as historical monuments:

- Houses and Farms (18th-19th century)
- The Menementa Farm (1827)
- The Iguxkagerrea Farm (18th century)
- The Joalginenborda Farm (19th century)

Other sites of interest

- Cromlechs: There are three Harrespils on the Argibel site. These are great circles of stone or "menhirs" for funerary purposes, dated from the 1st millennium BC. The Harrespil are notable due to their number (over 100 registered) and their witness to knowledge of ancient burial rites.

=== Religious Heritage ===
The commune has two religious sites that are registered as historical monuments:

- The 'Chapel of the Assumption (1868) at a place called Eznazu has been listed on the Inventory of cultural heritage since 21 March 2003. It contains a Retable and Statues (17th century) which are registered as historical objects.
- The Parish Church of Notre-Dame (17th century) has a rosary which belonged to the Emperor Maximilian.

Other religious sites of interest

- Some Hilarri in the cemetery are from the 19th century - two from 1805.

=== Environmental heritage ===
- Palombière is the property of the association of the Baigorry Valley. This hunt at 500 metres above sea level was created in 1840 by the mayor of the town, Charles Schmarsow. Reorganized in 1880, it then passed into the hands of the Ospital family who still lead the hunt. The five Filetiers use five pantières or special nets and ten beaters to direct the pigeons to the nets.

=== Picture Gallery ===
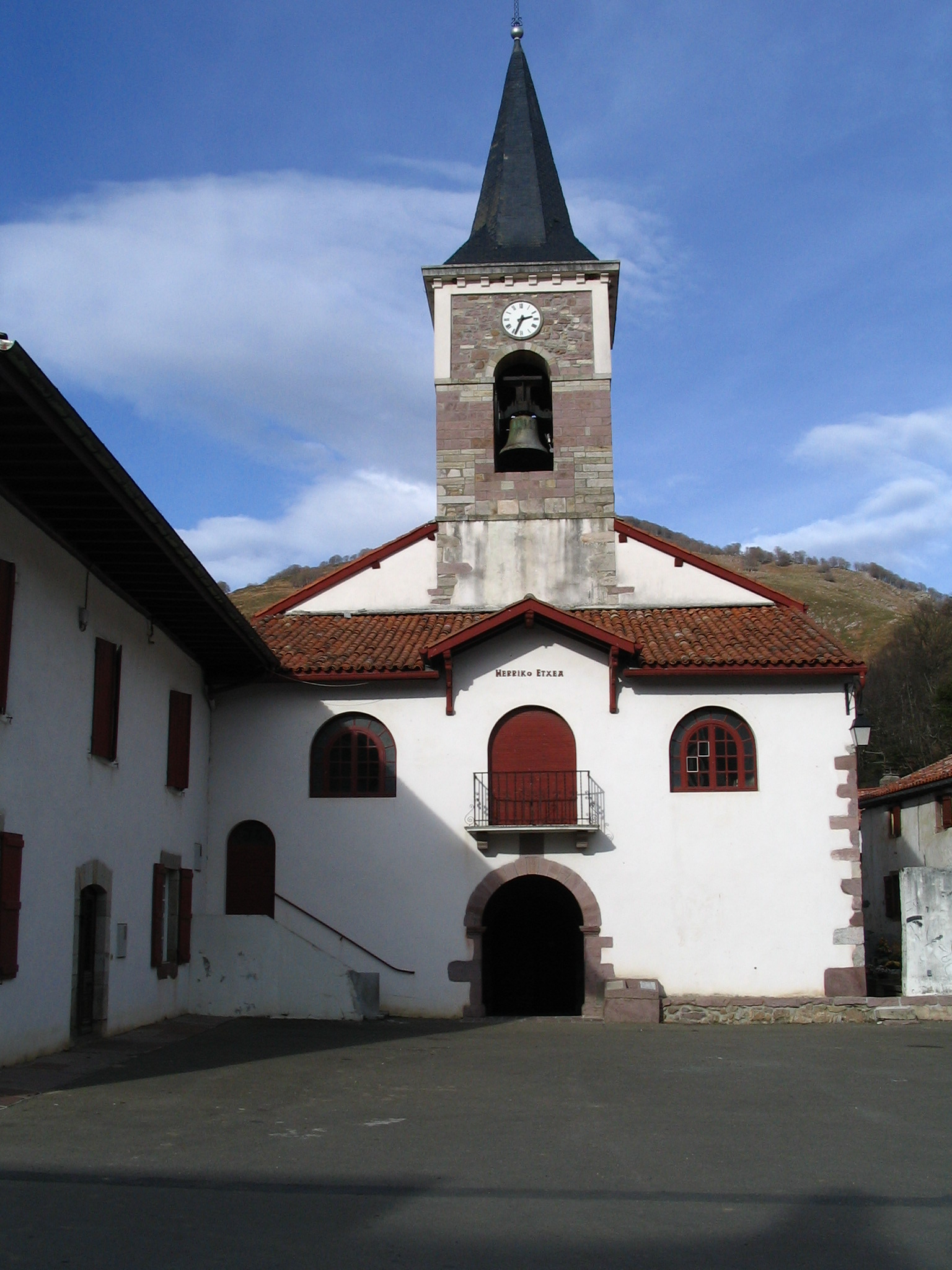
Church of Aldudes

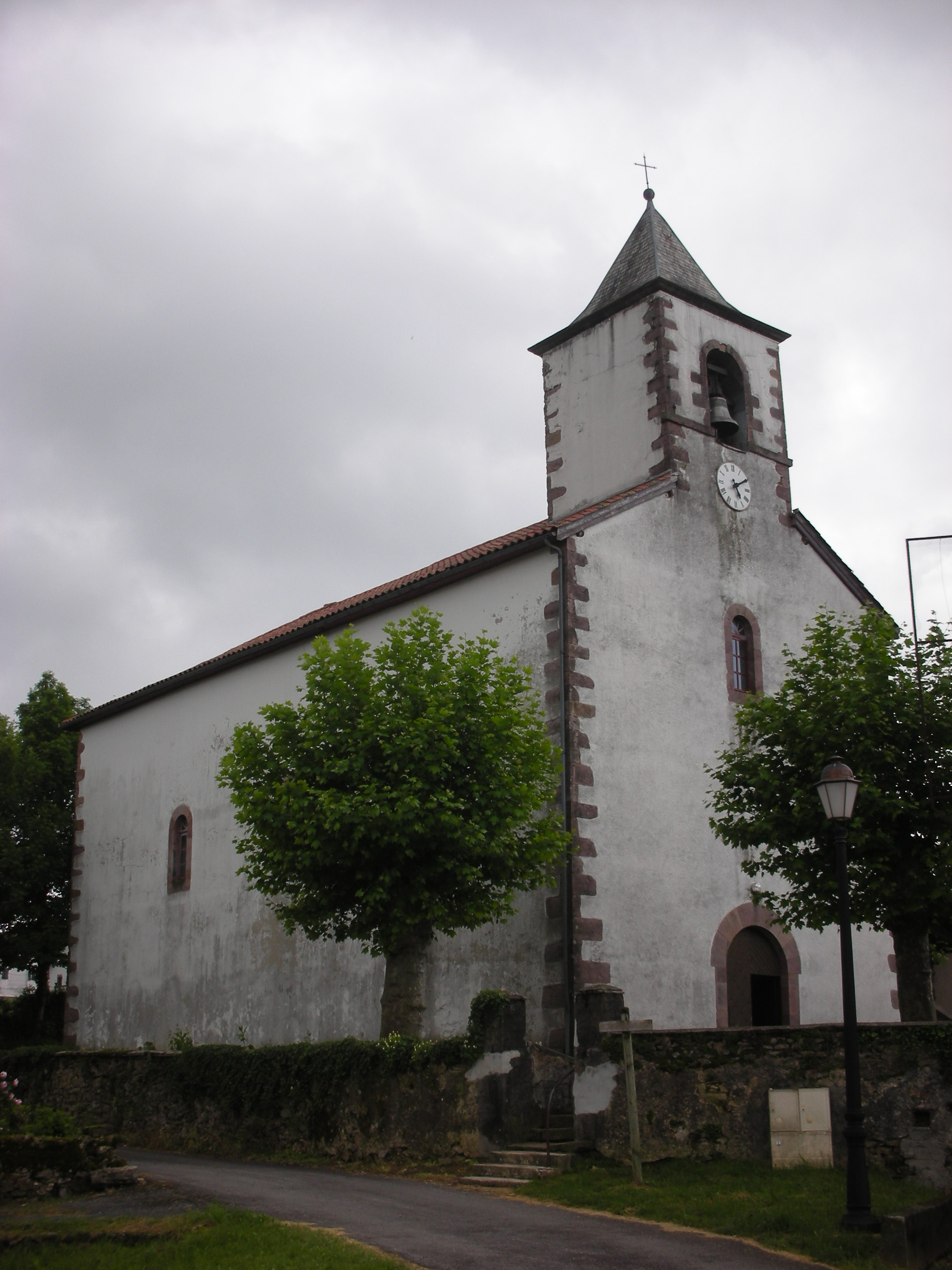
The Church

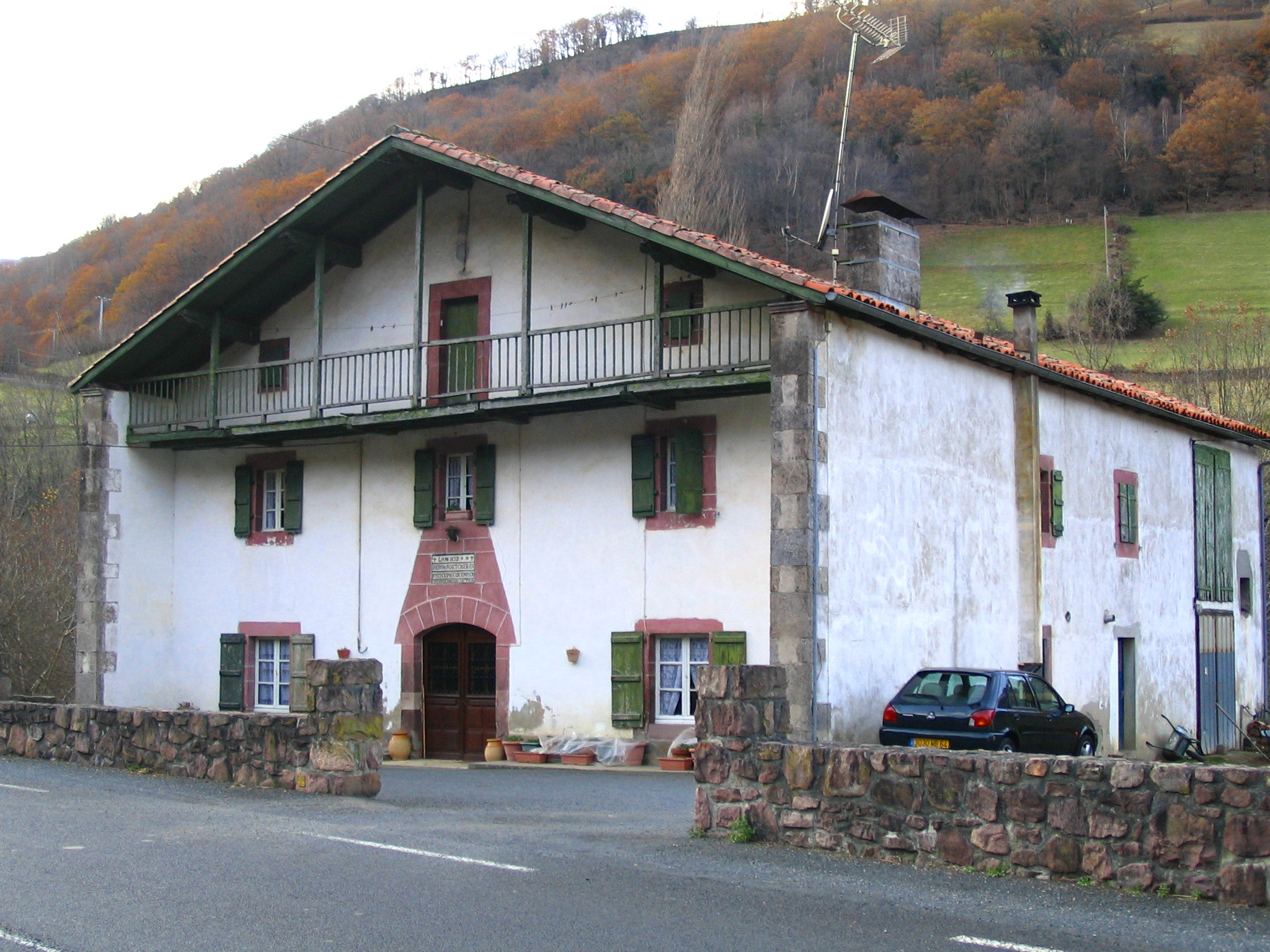
The Bank

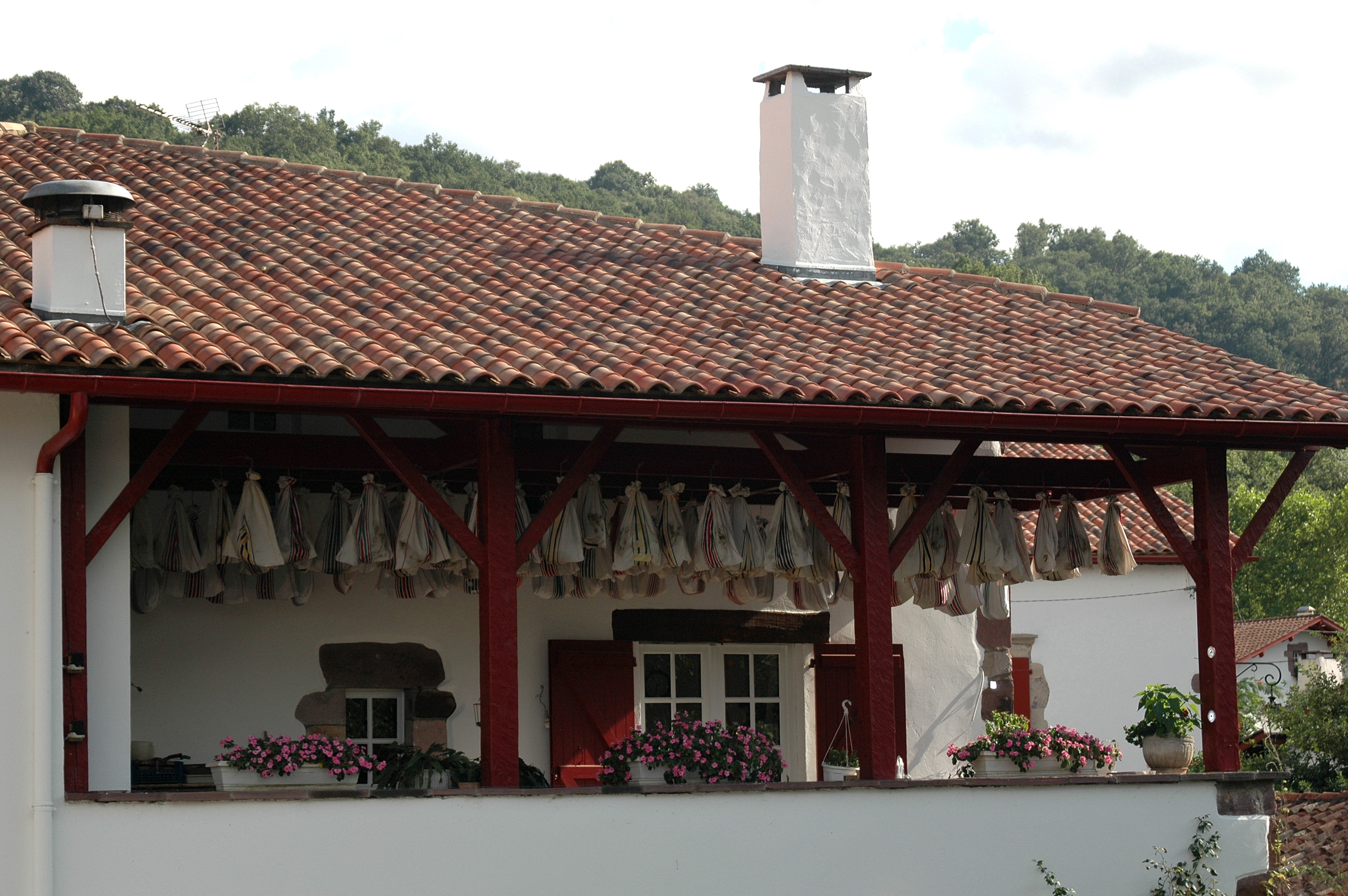
Salting along the Nive

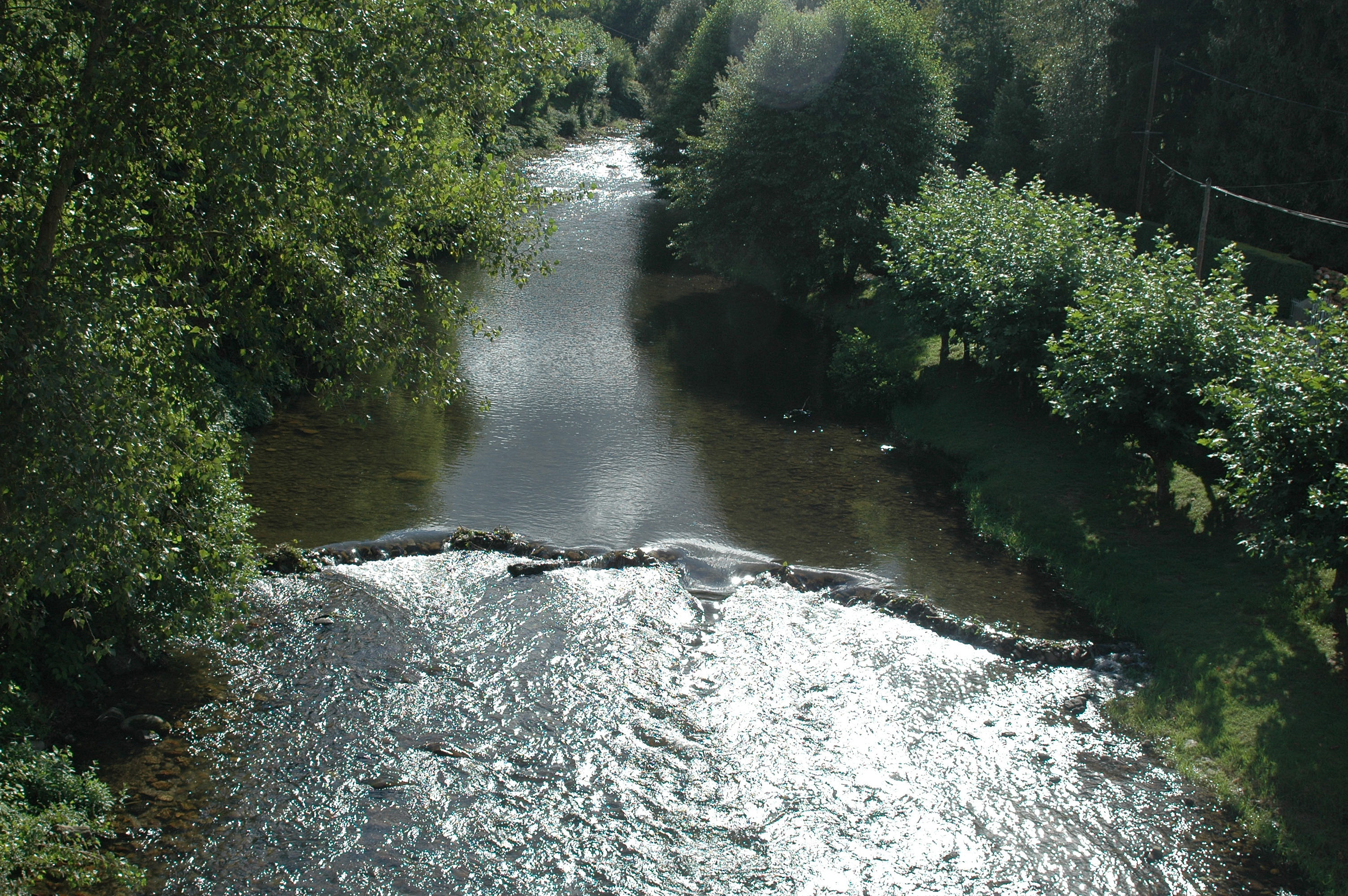
The Weir on the Nive

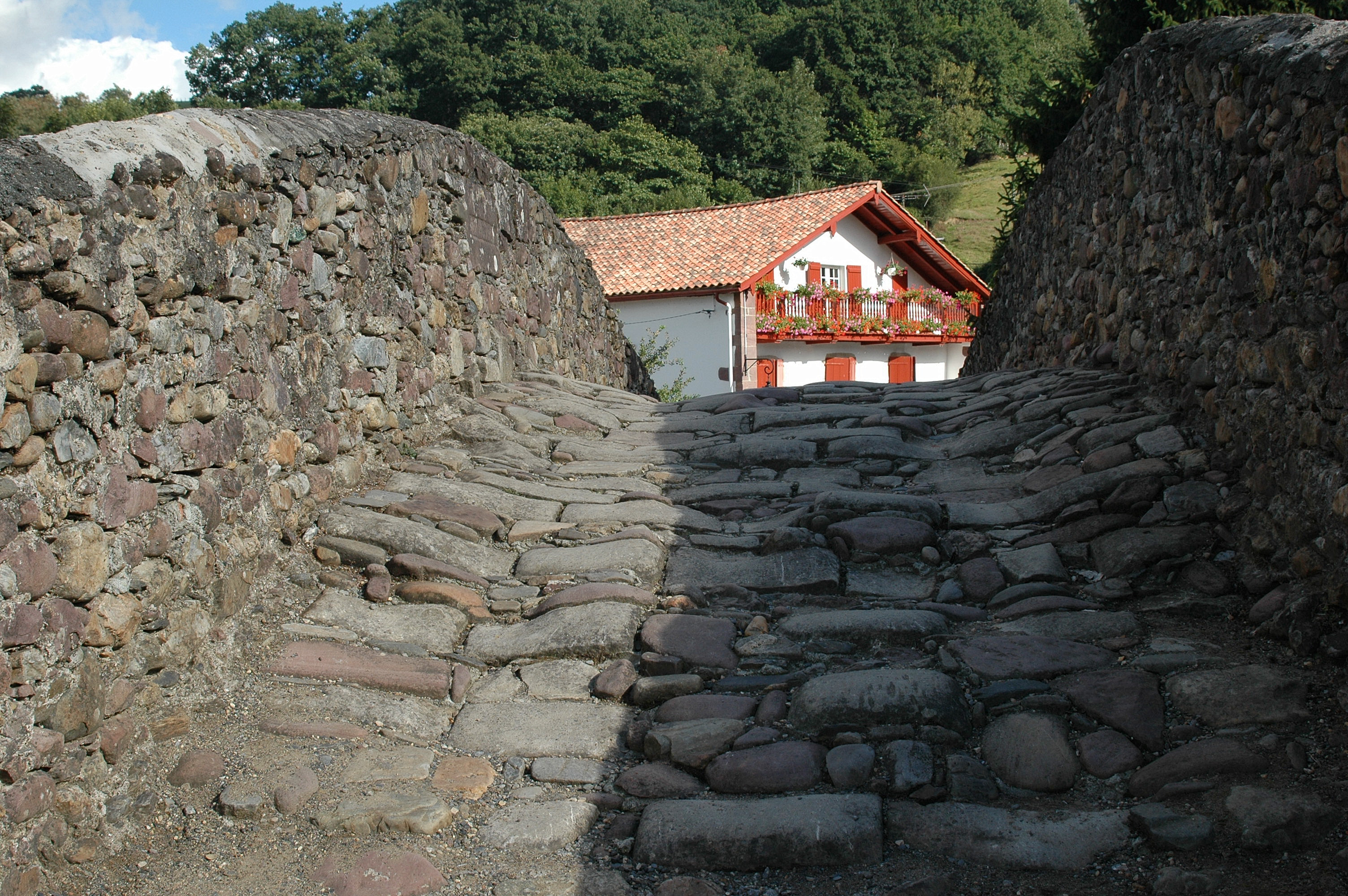
The Roman bridge on the Nive

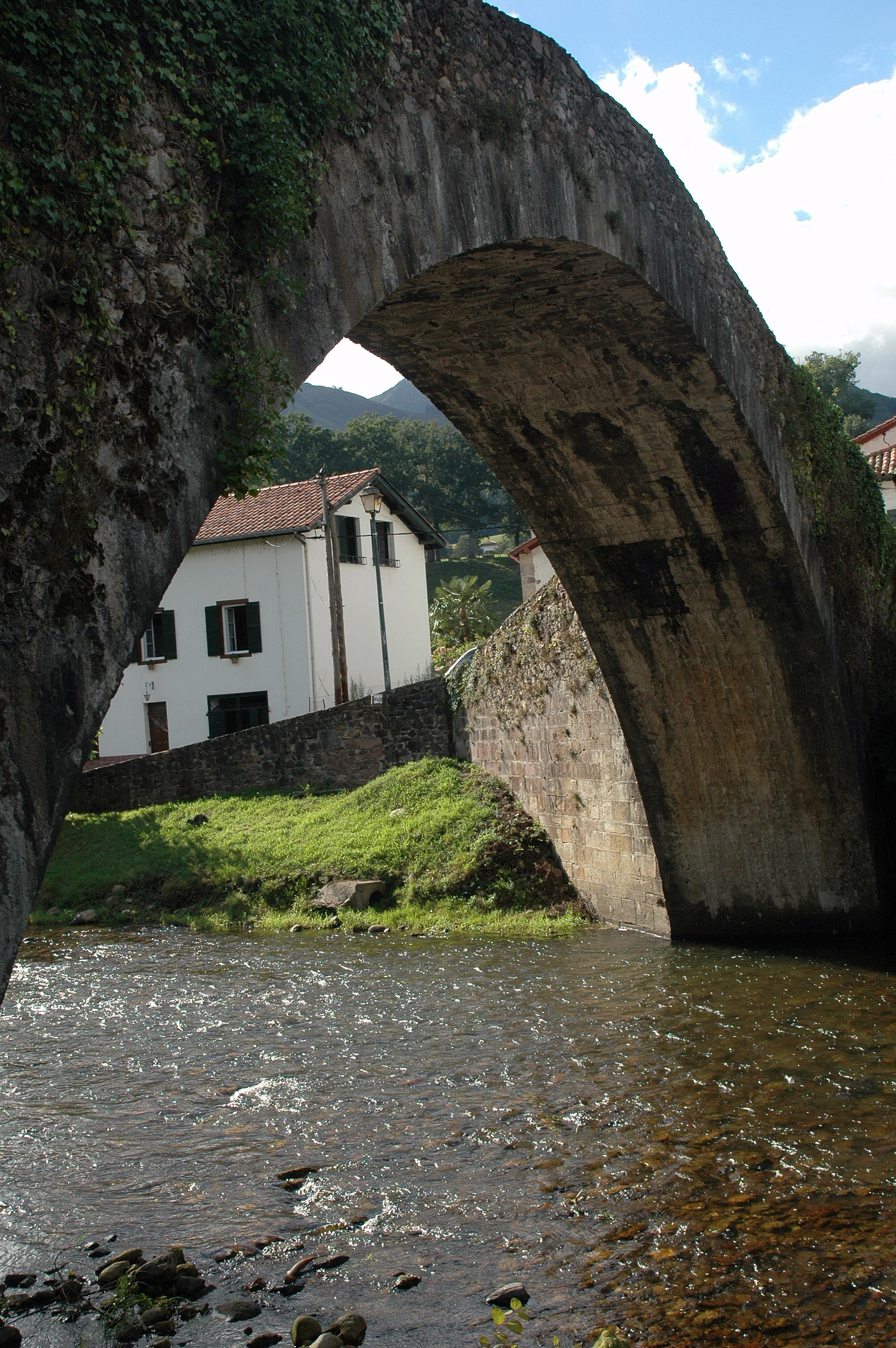
The Roman Bridge

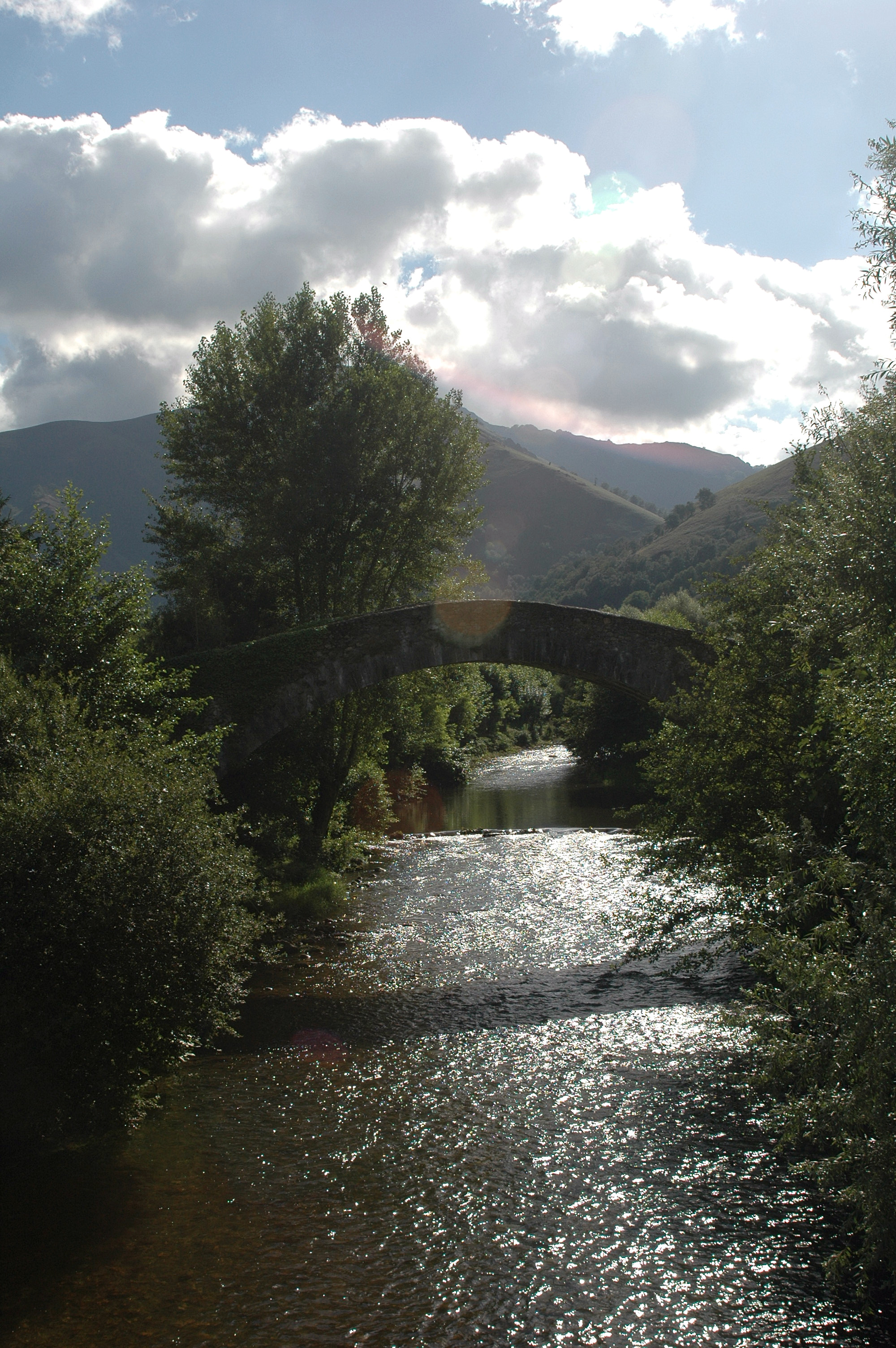
The Roman Bridge

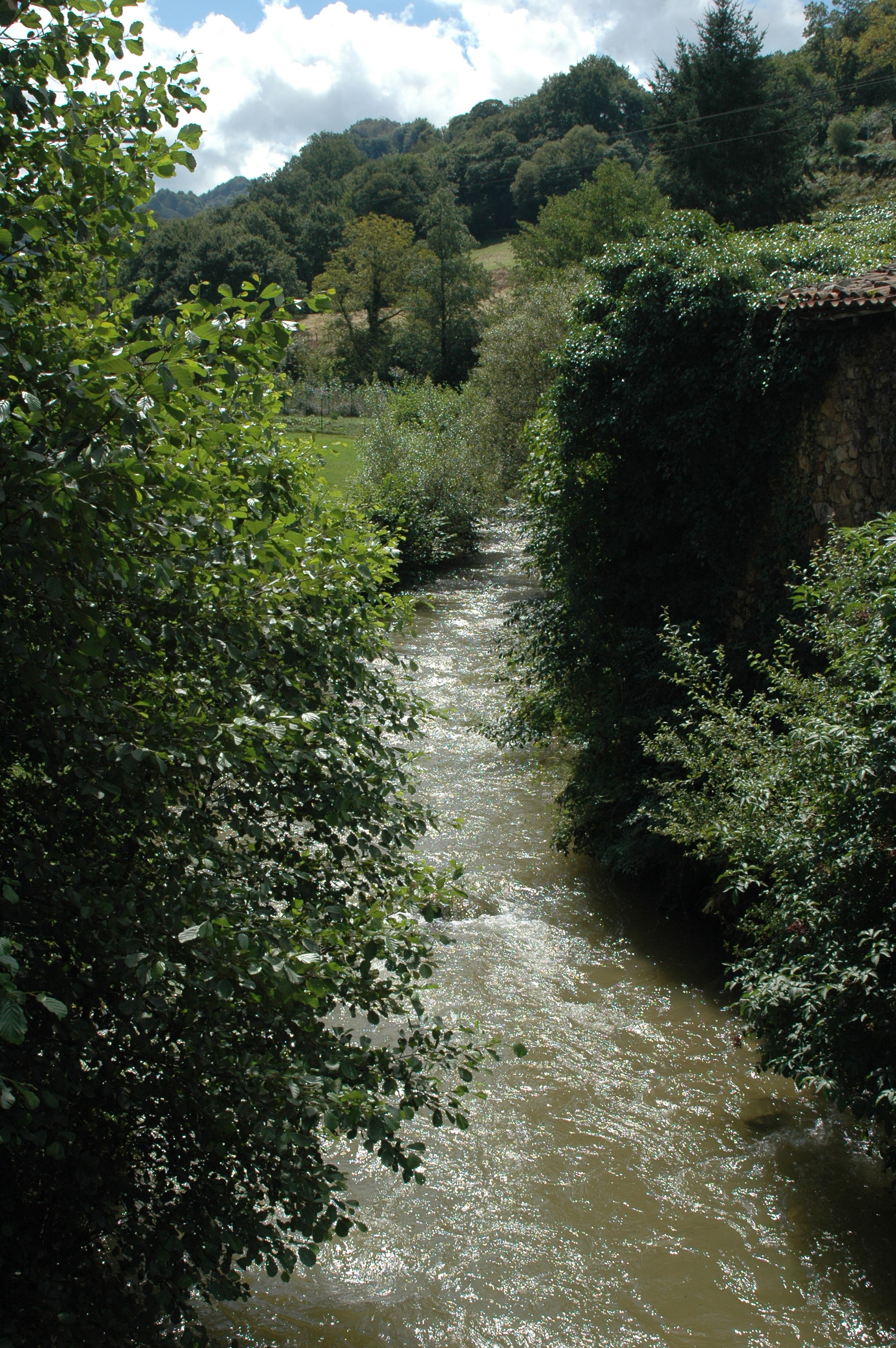
The Urepel Bridge over the Nive

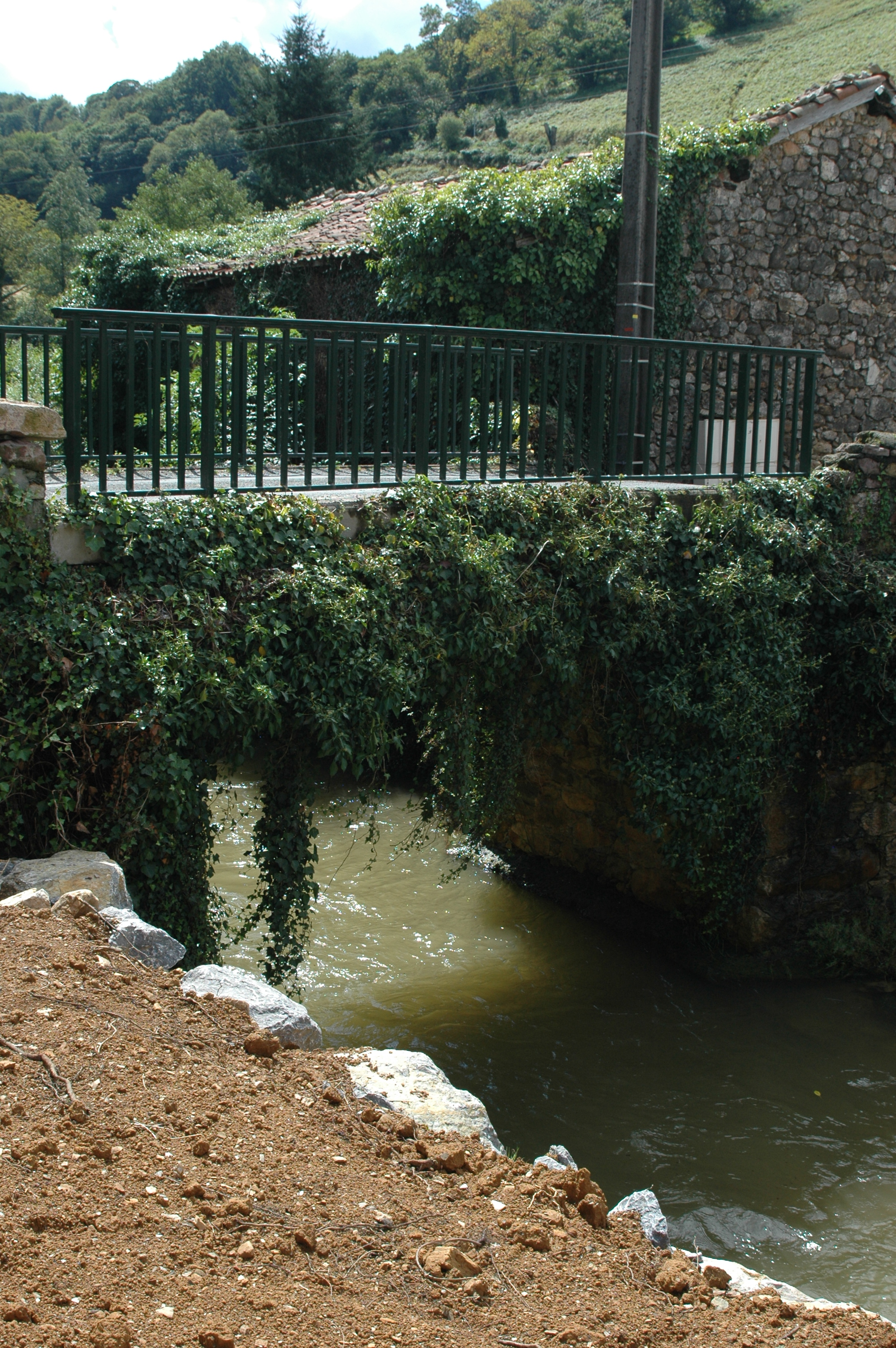
The Urepel Bridge

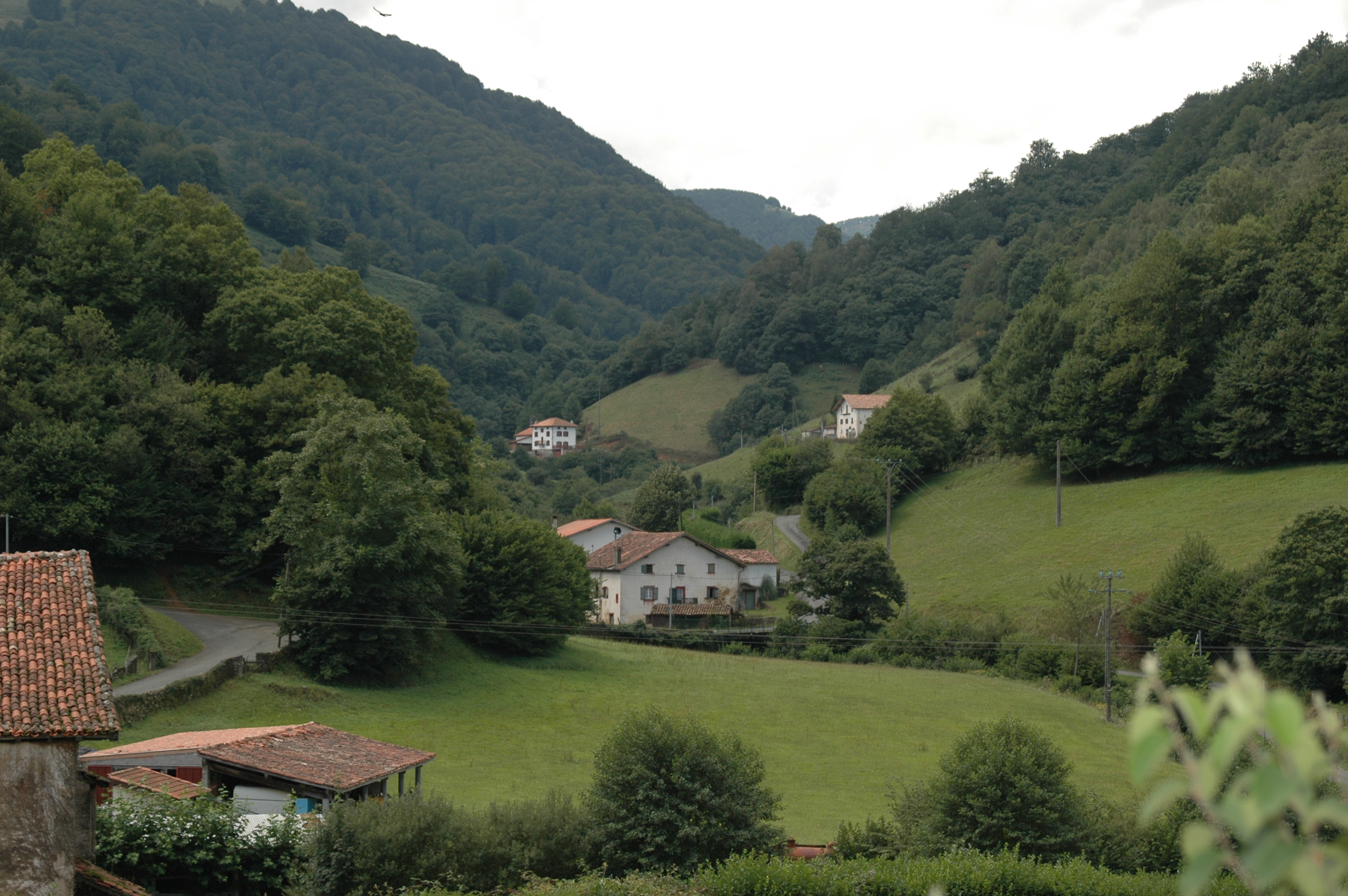
The Urepel Valley

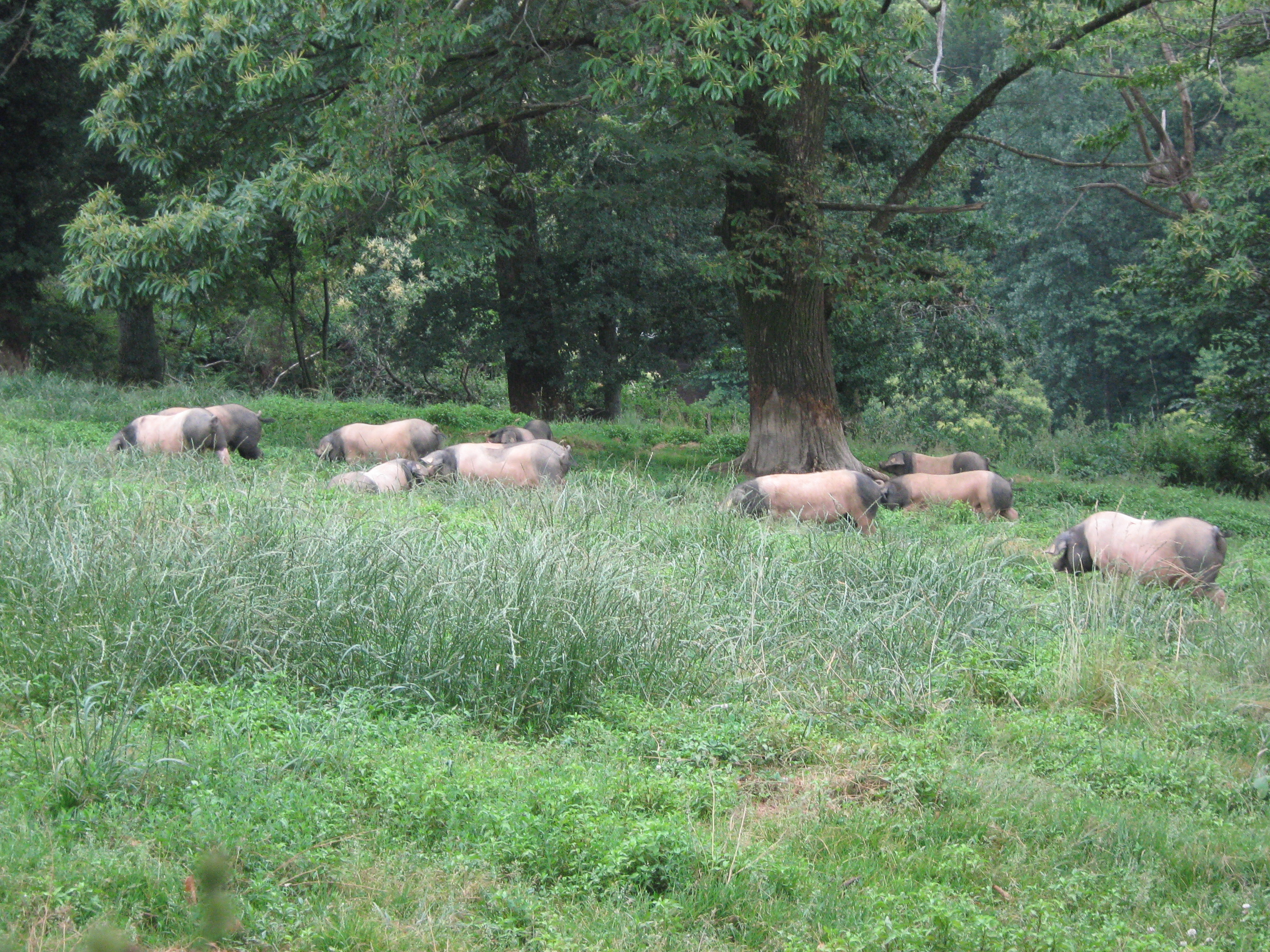
A Basque pig farm

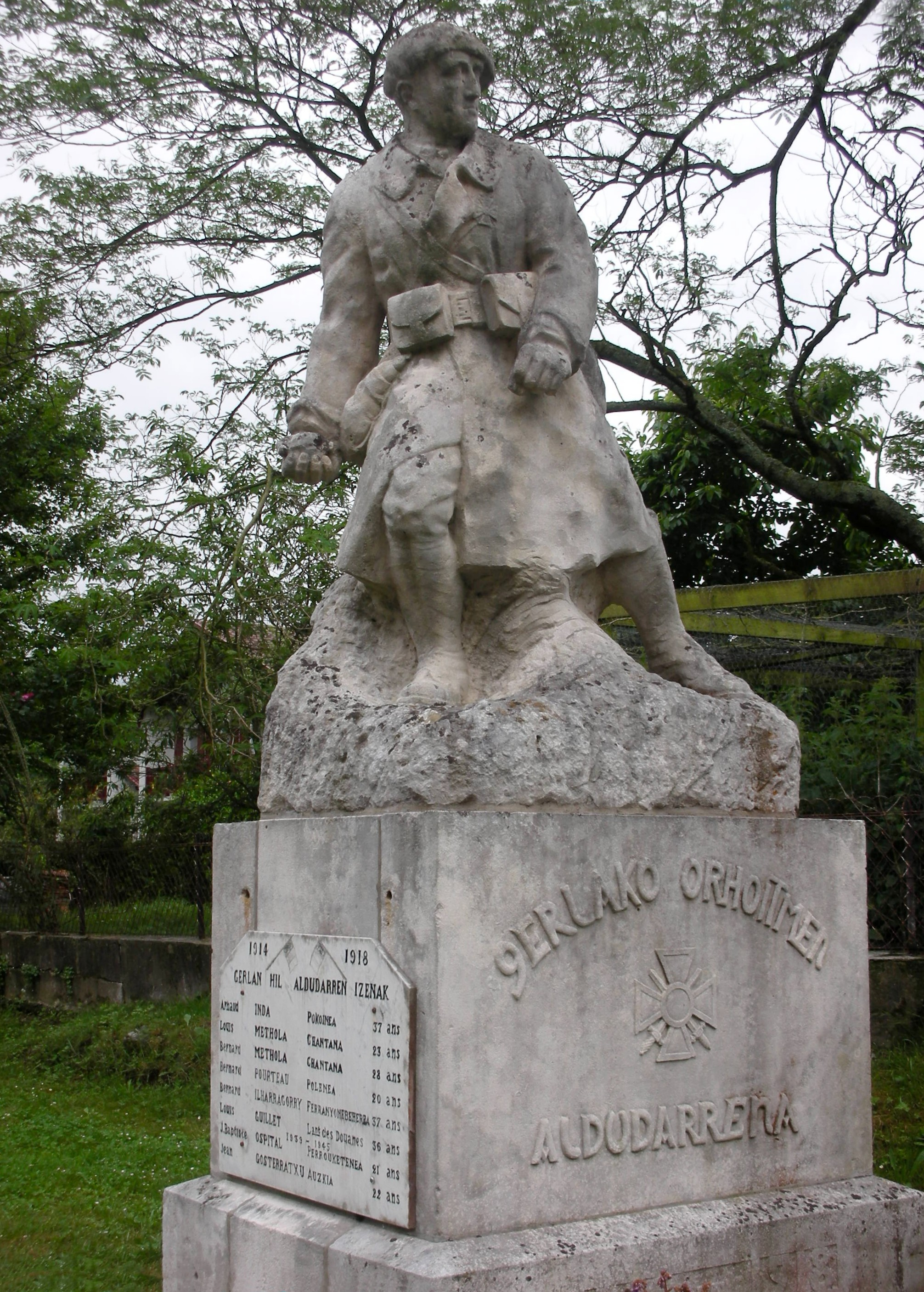
The War Memorial

== Facilities ==
=== Education ===
The commune has a private primary school (Mendi-Alde).

== Notable People linked to the commune ==
- Georges Lacombe, born 31 January 1879 in Orthez and died July 1947 in Paris, was a linguist, bascologuue, and Basque French academic. On the eve of the First World War he prepared, with the help of Dr. Jean Etchepare, a doctorate in Letters on the Aldudes dialect.
- Bernard Delhom, born in 1885 in Aldudes, was the oldest man in France from 30 December 1995 to 7 February 1996 when he died in Paris aged 110 years and 213 days
- Jean-Baptiste Urrutia, born in 1901 at Aldudes and died in Montbeton, was a missionary in Indochina and Bishop of Huế during the Indochina War and the Vietnam War

== See also ==
- Communes of the Pyrénées-Atlantiques department
- Cantons of the Pyrénées-Atlantiques department
- Arrondissements of the Pyrénées-Atlantiques department
