= List of compositions by Jean-Baptiste Lully =

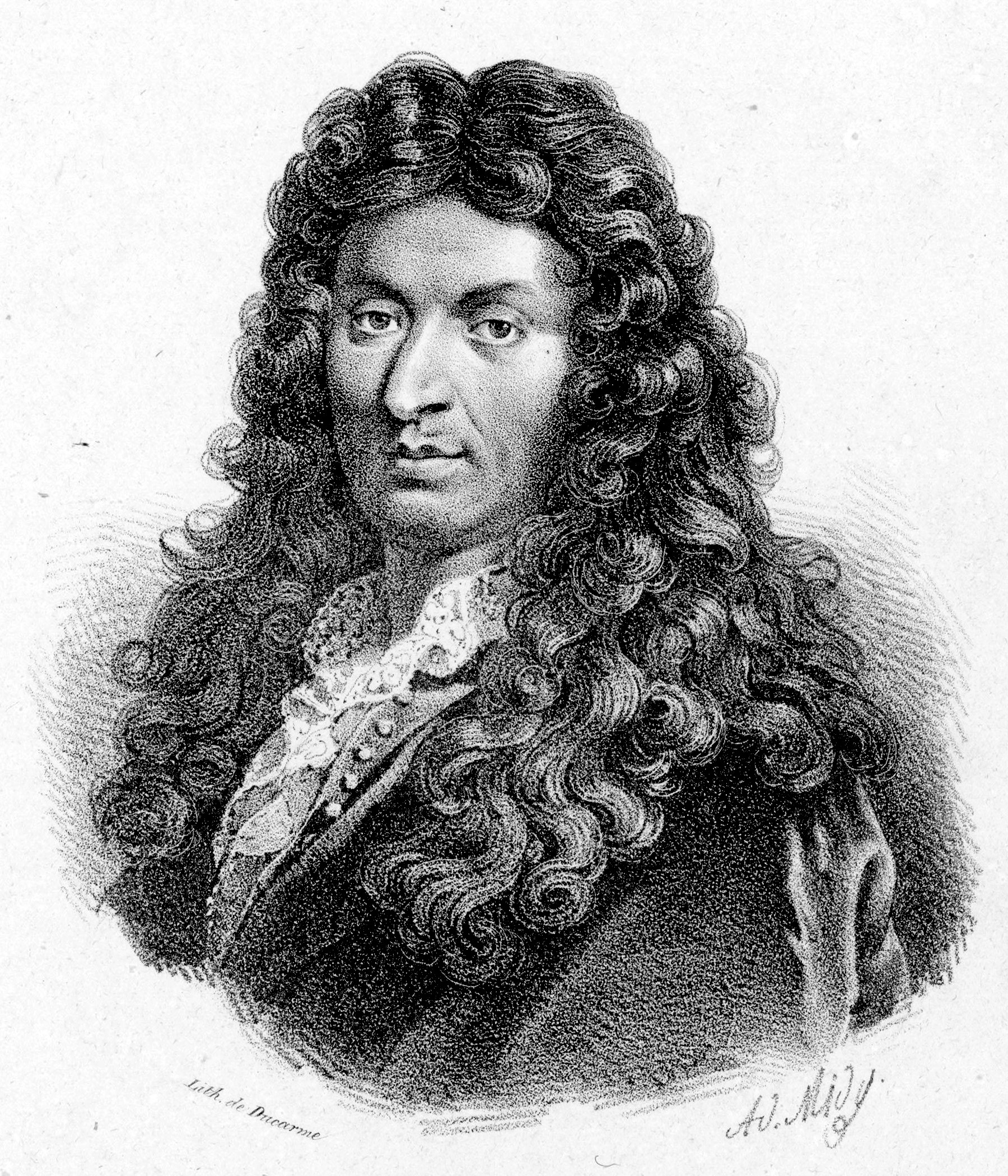
Jean Baptiste Lully around 1670.

This article contains a list of the works of Jean-Baptiste Lully (LWV); also lists of the dance-forms and instruments he frequently was to use.

== Works by Lully (Lully-Werke-Verzeichnis) ==
The catalogue was published in 1981 by Herbert Schneider (Chronologisch-Thematisches Verzeichnis sämtlicher Werke von Jean-Baptiste Lully).

ID	Title
LWV 1	Le temps
LWV 2	Les plaisirs
LWV 3	Dialogue de la Guerre avec la Paix
LWV 4	Les bienvenus
LWV 5	La revente des habits de ballet et de comédie
LWV 6	Psyché, ou La puissance de l'amour
LWV 7	La galanterie du temps
LWV 8	Amour malade
LWV 9	Alcidiane
LWV 10	Première marche des mousquetaires
LWV 11	La raillerie
LWV 12	Intermèdes de Xerxes
LWV 13	Ballet mascarade
LWV 14	L'impatience
LWV 15	Les saisons
LWV 16	Les facheux
LWV 17	L'Hercule amoureux
LWV 18	Les arts
LWV 19	Les Noces de village
LWV 20	Le mariage forcé
LWV 21	Les amours déguisés
LWV 22	Plaisirs de l'Ile enchantée
LWV 23	Entractes d'Œdipe
LWV 24	Mascarade du Capitaine
LWV 25	Miserere
LWV 26	O Lachrymae fideles
LWV 27	La naissance de Vénus
LWV 28	Les gardes, ou Les délices de la campagne
LWV 29	L'Amour médecin
LWV 30	Le triomphe de Bacchus dans les Indes
LWV 31	Branles
LWV 32	Les muses
LWV 33	La pastorale comique
LWV 34	Le Sicilien, ou L'Amour peintre
LWV 35	18 Trios pour le coucher du roi
LWV 36	Le carnaval
LWV 37	Plaude laetare Gallia
LWV 38	George Dandin
LWV 39	La grotte de Versailles
LWV 40	Flore
LWV 41	Monsieur de Pourceaugnac
LWV 42	Les Amants magnifiques
LWV 43	Le bourgeois gentilhomme / Der Bürger als Edelmann
LWV 44	Marches et batteries de tambour
LWV 45	Psyché
LWV 46	Ballet des ballets
LWV 47	Le triomphe de l’amour et de Bachus (pastorale, 1672, as described and named in the manuscript)
LWV 48	Marche
LWV 49	Cadmus et Hermione
LWV 50	Alceste, ou Le triomphe d'Alcide
LWV 51	Thésée
LWV 52	Le carnaval
LWV 53	Atys
LWV 54	Isis
LWV 55	Te Deum
LWV 56	Psyché
LWV 57	Bellérophon
LWV 58	Proserpine
LWV 59	Le triomphe de l'amour
LWV 60	Persée
LWV 61	Phaëton
LWV 62	De profundis
LWV 63	Amadis
LWV 64	1. Dies irae
LWV 64	2. Benedictus
LWV 65	Roland
LWV 66	Marches pour le régiment de Savoie
LWV 67	Quare fremuerunt
LWV 68	Idylle sur la paix
LWV 69	Le temple de la paix
LWV 70	Pièces de symphonie
LWV 71	Armide
LWV 72	Airs pour le carrousel de Monseigneur
LWV 73	Acis et Galatée / Acis und Galatea
LWV 74	Achille et Polyxène
LWV 75	Marches
LWV 76	1. Ingrate bergère
LWV 76	2. Aunque prodigoas
LWV 76	3. Scoca pur tutti
LWV 76	4. A la fin petit Desfarges
LWV 76	5. D'un beau pêcheur la pêche malheureuse
LWV 76	6. Un tendre coeur
LWV 76	7. Courage, Amour, la paix est faite
LWV 76	8. Non vi è più bel piacer
LWV 76	9. Le printemps, aimable Silvie
LWV 76	10. Tous les jours cent bergères
LWV 76	11. Viens, mon aimable bergère
LWV 76	12. Qui les aura, mes secrètes amours
LWV 76	13. Où êtes-vous allez, mes belles
LWV 76	14. Nous meslons toute notre gloire
LWV 76	15. Pendant que ces flambeaux
LWV 76	16. La langueur des beaux yeux
LWV 76	17. On dit que vos yeux sont trompeurs
LWV 76	18. Que vous connaissez peu trop aimable Climène
LWV 76	19. Si je n'ay parlé de ma flamme
LWV 76	20. En ces lieux je ne vois que des promenades
LWV 76	21. Ah qu'il est doux de se rendre
LWV 76	22. J'ai fait serment, cruelle, de suivre une autre loi
LWV 76	23. Le printemps ramène la verdure
LWV 76	24. Depuis que l'on soupire sous l'amoureux empire
LWV 76	25. Sans mentir on est bien misérable
LWV 76	26. Venerabilis barba capucinorum
LWV 77	1. Anima Christi
LWV 77	2. Ave coeli munus supernum
LWV 77	3. Dixit Dominus
LWV 77	4. Domine salvum fac regem
LWV 77	5. Exaudi Deus deprecationem
LWV 77	6. Iste Sanctus
LWV 77	7. Laudate pueri Dominum
LWV 77	8. Magnificat anima mea
LWV 77	9. O dulcissime Domine
LWV 77	10. Omnes Gentes plaudite
LWV 77	11. O sapientia in misterio
LWV 77	12. Regina coeli
LWV 77	13. Salve regina
LWV 77	14. Domine salvum fac regem
LWV 77	15. Exaudiat te Dominus
LWV 77	16. Jubilate Deo
LWV 77	17. Notus in Judea Deus
LWV 77	18. Il faut mourir, pécheur
LWV 77	19. Si je n'ay parlé de ma flamme
LWV 77	20. En ces lieux je ne vois que des promenades
LWV 77	21. Ah qu'il est doux de se rendre
LWV 77	22. J'ai fait serment, cruelle, de suivre une autre loi
LWV 77	23. Le printemps ramène la verdure
LWV 77	24. Depuis que l'on soupire sous l'amoureux empire
LWV 77	25. Sans mentir on est bien misérable
LWV 77	26. Venerabilis barba capucinorum (air à boire)

== Works by genre ==
=== Operas (Tragédies en musique) ===
- Cadmus et Hermione (1673)
- Alceste (1674)
- Thésée (1675)
- Atys (1676)
- Isis (1677)
- Psyché (1678)
- Bellérophon (1679)
- Proserpine (1680)
- Persée (1682)
- Phaëton (1683)
- Amadis (1684)
- Roland (1685)
- Armide (1686)
- Achille et Polyxène (1687) (Finished by Pascal Collasse)

=== Pastorales ===
- Pastorale Comique (1657)
- Les fêtes de l'Amour et de Bacchus (1672)
- Acis et Galatée (1686)

=== Ballets ===
- La raillerie, or Mockery, (1659)
- La revente des habits du ballet et comédie (1661)
- L'impatience (1661)
- Les saisons (1661)
- Les arts (1663)
- Les noces de village (1663)
- Les amours desguisés (1664)
- Palais d'Alcine (1664)
- Le naissance de Vénus (1665)
- Les gardes (1665)
- Mascarade du capitaine (1665)
- Petit ballet de Fontainebleau (1665)
- Les muses (1666)
- Le carnaval (1668)
- Flore (1669)
- La jeunesse (1669)
- Les jeux pythiens (1670)
- Ballet des nations (1670) in Le Bourgeois gentilhomme written by Molière
- Le triomphe de l'amour (1681)
- Le temple de la paix (1685)

=== Ballets written with others ===
- Mascarade de la foire de St-Germain (1652)
- Les proverbes (1654)
- Le temps (1654)
- Les plaisirs (1655)
- Les bienvenus (1655)
- Psyché ou la puissance de l'amour (1656)
- Les galanteries du temps (1657)
- Les plaisirs troublés (1657)
- Alcidiane (LWV 9, 1658, with Boësset)
- Le triomphe de Bacchus dans les Indes (1666)

=== Comedies (Comédies) ===
- L'Impromptu de Versailles (1663)
- Le Mariage forcé (1664)
- L'Amour médecin (1665)
- Le Sicilien (1667)
- Georges Dandin (1668)
- Monsieur de Pourceaugnac (1669)
- Les Amants Magnifiques (1670)
- La Comtesse d'Escarbagnas (1671)

=== Comédie-ballets ===
- Les Plaisirs de l'île enchantée (1664)
- La Princesse d'Elide (1664)
- Le Bourgeois Gentilhomme (1670)

=== Comedies cowritten with Lully ===
- Les fâcheux (1661)

=== Tragédie-ballets ===
- Psyché (1671)

=== Divertissements ===
- Le Grand Divertissement de Versailles (1668) in Georges Dandin
- Le Divertissement de Chambord (1669) in Monsieur de Pourceaugnac
- Le Divertissement Royal (1670) in Les Amants Magnifiques
- Idylle sur la Paix (1685)

=== Eclogues (Églogues) ===
- La grotte de Versailles (1668)

=== Interludes (Intermèdes) ===
- Les noces de Pélée et de Thétis (1654)
- Xerxes (1660)
- Hercule amoureux (1662)
- Oedipe (1664)

=== Grands motets ===
in order of composition:

- Jubilate Deo omnis terra (Psalm 100), LWV 77/16 (1660)
- Miserere mei Deus (Psalm 51), LWV 25 (1664)
- O lachrymae fideles, LWV 26 (1664)
- Plaude laetare Gallia, LWV 37 (1668)
- Te Deum, LWV 55 (1677)
- De profundis clamavi ad te (Psalm 130) in G Minor, LWV 62 (1683)
- Dies irae in G Minor, LWV 64/1 (1683)
- Canticle: Benedictus Dominus Deus Israel, LWV 64/2 (1683)
- Quare fremuerunt (Psalm 2), LWV 67 (1684)
- Exaudiat te Dominus (Psalm 20), LWV 77/15 (1684)
- Notus in Judaea Deus (Psalm 76), LWV 77/17 (1685)

=== Petits motets ===
in alphabetical order:

- Anima Christi, LWV 77/1 (1684)
- Ave caeli munus supernum à 3, LWV 77/2 (1684)
- Dixit Dominus (Psalm 109), LWV 77/3
- Domine salvum fac regem, LWV 77/14 (1670)
- Exaudi Deus deprecationem, LWV 77/5
- Laudate pueri Dominum (Psalm 112), LWV 77/7 (1685)
- O dulcissime Domine, LWV 77/9 (1685)
- Omnes gentes plaudite, LWV 77/10
- O sapientia in misterio, LWV 77/11
- Marian antiphon: Regina caeli laetare, LWV 77/12 (1684)
- Marian antiphon: Salve regina, LWV 77/13 (1684)

=== Other works ===
- Air de tendre et courante
- Dialogue de la guerre avec la paix (1655)
- Première marche des mousquetaires (1658)
- Courage, amour, la paix est faite (1661)
- Douce et charmante paix (1661)
- Ingrate bergère (1664)
- Qui les saura, mes secrètes amours (1664)
- Branles (1665)
- Trios pour le coucher du roi (1665)
- Belle inhumaine, soulagez la peine (1665)
- Savez-vous bien, la belle (1665)
- La langueur des beaux yeux (1666)
- Que vous connaissez peu trop aimable Climène (1666)
- Si je n'ai parlé de ma flamme (1666)
- En ces lieux, je ne vois que des promenades (1668)
- Ah, qu'il est doux de se rendre à l'empire de l'Amour (1668)
- Le printemps ramène la verdure (1668)
- Depuis que l'on soupire sous l'amoureux empire (1668)
- Marches et batteries de tambour (1670)
- Sans mentir on est bien misérable (1671)
- Marche (1672)
- Marches pour le régiment de Savoie (1685)
- Pièces de symphonies, Airs pour Mme la Dauphine (1683)
- Airs pour le carrousel de Monseigneur (1686)
- Il faut mourir, pécheur (1687)
- Gigue
- Marches dont la marche des dragons du Roi, La marche du Prince d'Orange
- Marche des mousquetaires noirs
- Marche des mousquetaires gris
- Aunque prodigoas
- Soca per tutti
- A la fin petit Desfarges
- D'un beau pêcheur, la pêche malheureuse
- Un tendre coeur
- Non vi è più bel piacer
- Le printemps, aimable Sylvie
- Tous les jours cent bergères
- Viens, mon aimable bergère
- Nous mêlons toute notre gloire
- Pendant que ces flambeaux
- Venerabilis barba capucinorum

=== Apocryphal composition(s) ===
French sources widely attribute to Lully the composition of the British patriotic anthem God Save the King: the sole ultimate source of the attribution is a 19th-century forgery, the Souvenirs of the Marquise de Créquy (q.v.).

The music of the Provençal Christmas carol La Marche des Rois is sometimes attributed to Lully, but no document corroborates this attribution. (See article The March of the Kings.)
