= Jacques Laumosnier =

French painter

Jacques Laumosnier (ca. 1669 – ca. 1744) was a French painter known above all as painter to René de Froulay, Count of Tessé.

== Birth and apprenticeship with Gobelins ==
Born in Paris in 1669 or shortly before, Jacques Laumosnier belonged to a family of well-to-do artisans from Clichy-la-Garenne and Paris. He probably completed his apprenticeship at the Gobelins factory, run by the painters Charles Le Brun and Adam Frans van der Meulen, and then, after 1690, by their successor Jean-Baptiste Martin. It was probably from the latter that he learned history painting. He was received as a master painter on April 7, 1693, and joined the Académie de Saint-Luc, a community bringing together Parisian master painters and sculptors.

== Painter to Marshal Tessé ==
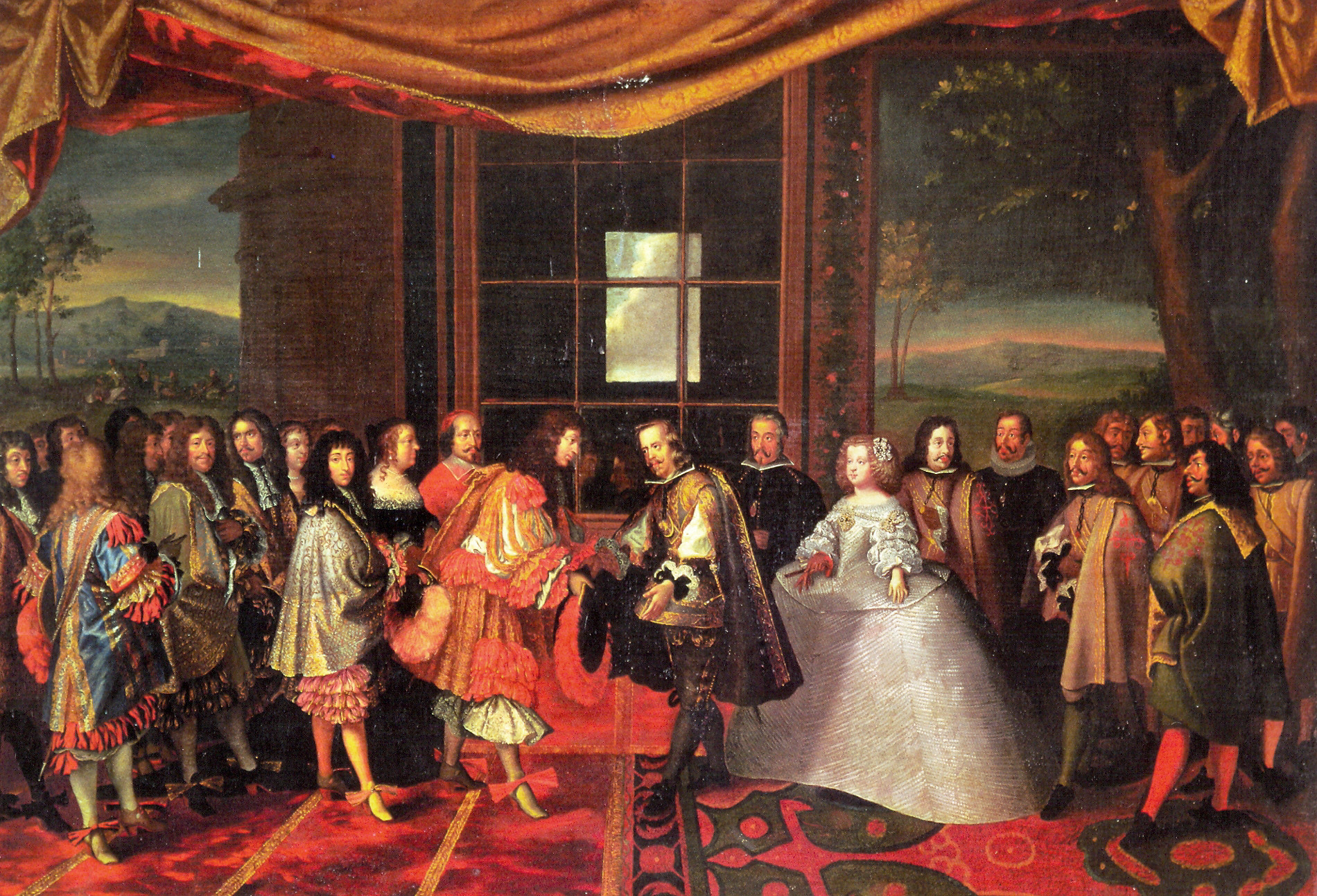
One of Laumosnier's first paintings, The Interview of Louis XIV and Philip IV on Pheasant Island in 1660 (fr:Entrevue des deux rois sur l'île des Faisans)

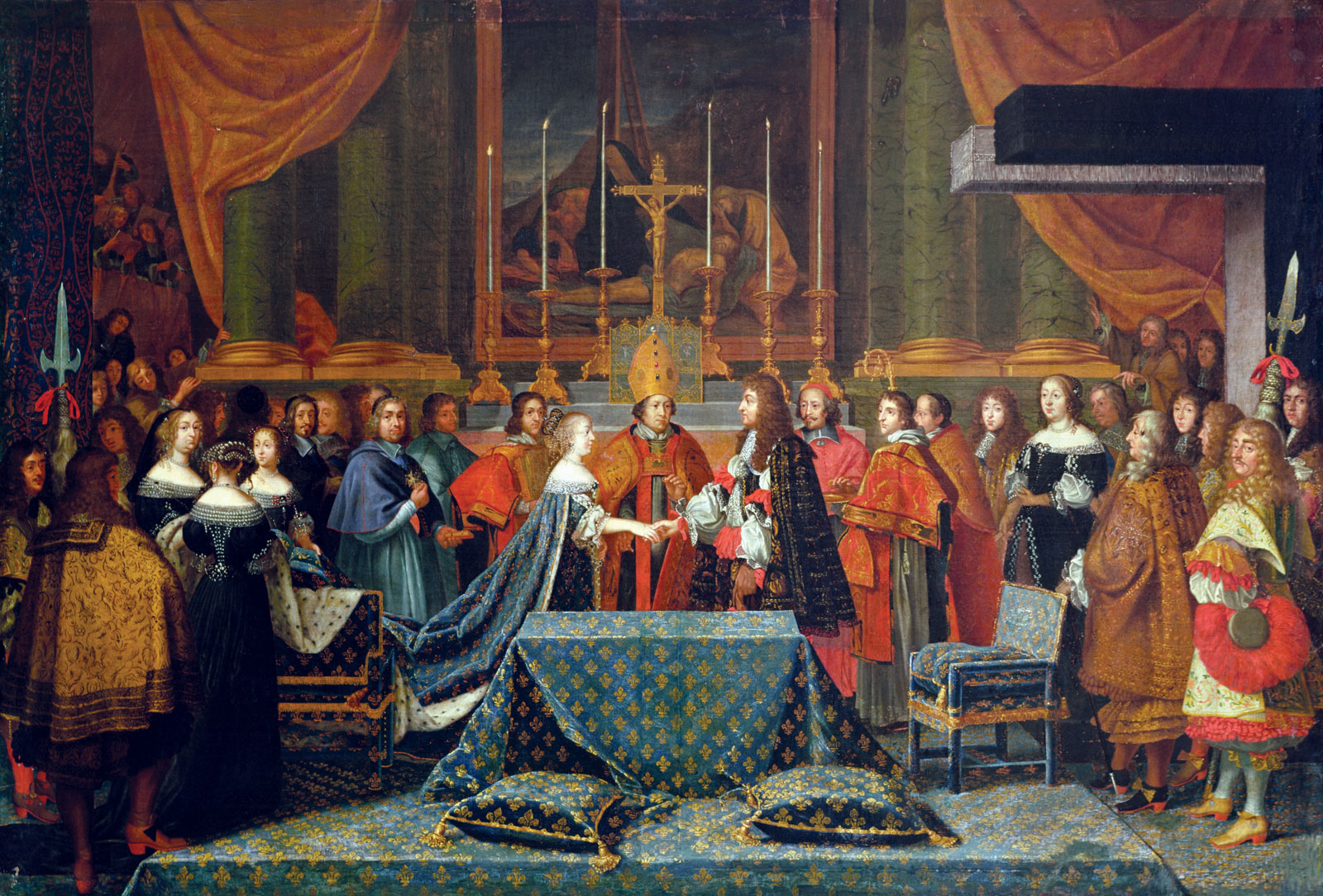
Marriage of Louis XIV and Marie-Thérèse of Austria

He was chosen by Marshal René de Froulay, Count of Tessé, to paint the first two paintings known to us by him, made from tapestry designs by the Gobelins: The Interview of Louis XIV and Philip IV on Pheasant Island and The Marriage of Louis XIV and Marie-Thérèse of Austria. Laumosnier produced nine large paintings for his patron representing the significant events in the Marshal's life.

== Painter to the king ==
From 1718 onwards, Laumosnier assumed the title of painter to the king. He appears to have collaborated with the flower painters Jean-Baptiste Belin father and son, known to have worked in various royal residences such as Saint-Germain, Fontainebleau and Versailles. However, the works that Laumosnier produced for the king remain to be identified.

== Painter in the service of the aristocracy and the bourgeoisie ==
After the death of his protector in 1725, Laumosnier received various private commissions. He participated, probably under the direction of fr:Augustin Oudart Justina, in the decoration of the fr:Château d'Ermenonville. He also produced portraits in the style of Hyacinthe Rigaud, the most fashionable painter of the time, for wealthy aristocrats and bourgeois such as the Bishop of Arras or the financier Jean-Baptiste Petit-de-Saint-Lienne. In 1735 he was a professor at the Académie de Saint-Luc. At the date of his last known act, in 1744, Jacques Laumosnier was over 75 years old and no longer practicing.

== Works ==
=== History paintings ===
- The Interview of Louis XIV and Philip IV on Pheasant Island in 1660 (fr:Entrevue des deux rois sur l'île des Faisans), fr:Musée de Tessé, le Mans, reduced copy of the tapestry cartoon executed by Henri Testelin for the hanging of L'Histoire du Roi after Charles Le Brun and Adam Frans van der Meulen
- Marriage of Louis XIV and Marie-Thérèse of Austria, Musée de Tessé, le Mans, reduced copy of the tapestry cartoon executed by Henri Testelin for the hanging of L'Histoire du Roi after Charles Le Brun and Adam Frans van der Meulen
- Tessé reçoit de Louis XIV l'ordre du Saint-Esprit en 1694, private collection
- Tessé assiste par procuration aux fiançailles de Marie-Adélaïde de Savoie avec Louis de France en 1696, private collection
- Le maréchal de Tessé reçoit de Louis XIV le bâton de maréchal en 1703, private collection
- Le maréchal de Tessé reçoit de Philippe V le titre de Grand d'Espagne en 1704, private collection
- Le maréchal de Tessé, en mission diplomatique à Rome, présente ses lettres de créance au pape Clément XL, private collection
- Philippe V, roi d'Espagne, confère la Toison d'or au maréchal de Tessé comme ambassadeur à Madrid, (1725) Musée de Tessé, le Mans
- La Nymphe de Sceaux, (1735) fr:Musée du Domaine départemental de Sceaux, after a drawng by Charles Le Brun to illustrate the frontispiece of a poem by Philippe Quinault of 1677

=== Portraits ===
- Full-length portrait of Marshal Tessé, ca. 1703, Musée de Tessé, le Mans.
- François Baglion de La Salle, évêque d'Arras, lost painting known from an engraving by Laurent Cars (1729)
- Presumed portrait of the financier Jean-Baptiste Geoffroy Petit de Saint-Lienne (1728), private collection
