= Euskal Txerria =

Breed of pig native to Basque Country

The Euskal Txerria or Basque, is a breed of pig native to the Basque Country.

What is today called the Basque pig is one of several historical breeds or breed types kept by Basque peoples, and it was consolidated under the name only in the 1920s. Though they were relatively common in the early 20th century, Basque pigs had nearly disappeared by 1981, with fewer than 100 breeding sows left.

Today, the breed is preserved by small farmers in the Basque Country who are dedicated to traditional Basque foods. Basque pigs grow more slowly and develop more fat than modern breeds like the Large White, making them less well-suited to intensive commercial meat production, but they are marvelous to make high quality products. Basque sows have smallish litters of about nine young, but have a strong maternal instinct and are good mothers.
