= Borders of Spain =

Political boundaries between Spain and neighboring territories

To the northeast: France and Andorra, to the west: Portugal, to the south: Gibraltar and Morocco

Spain, formally known as the Kingdom of Spain (Spanish: Reino de España), is a sovereign nation primarily situated on the Iberian Peninsula in South Europe. It also includes the archipelagos Canary Islands and Balearic Islands, along with overseas territories bordering Morocco located in North Africa. The mainland is bordered by the Mediterranean Sea to the south and east, except for a small land border with Gibraltar. To the north and northeast, it shares borders with France, Andorra, and the Bay of Biscay, while Portugal and the Atlantic Ocean lie to the west and northwest. Spain is one of only three countries, along with France and Morocco, to have coastlines on both the Atlantic and Mediterranean. The Portugal–Spain border, stretching 1,214 km (754 mi), is the longest continuous border within the European Union. The total length of the border shared by Spain is 1,928 kilometres (1,198 mi).

== Borders ==
=== Spain–Portugal border ===
The Spain-Portugal border, commonly known as La Raya, is 1,292 kilometers long. It extends through the provinces of Pontevedra, Ourense, Zamora, Salamanca, Cáceres, Badajoz and Huelva in Spain, and the districts of Viana do Castelo, Braga, Vila Real, Bragança, Guarda, Castelo Branco, Portalegre, Évora, Beja, Faro in Portugal.

The border starts in the mouth of Minho River, and ends in the mouth of Guadiana River.

=== Spain-France border ===
The Spain-France border is 656.3 km long. It is divided in two parts, since it is interrupted by Andorra. The first part extends through the provinces of Gipuzkoa, Navarre, Huesca, Lleida and Girona in Spain, and the departments of Pyrénées-Atlantiques, Hautes-Pyrénées, Haute-Garonne, Ariège, Pyrénées-Orientales in France.

The border goes from the mouth of Bidasoa River to a cape between Cerbère and Portbou, and crosses the Pyrenees.

=== Spain–Andorra border ===
The Spain-Andorra border is 63.7 km long. It extends through the province of Lleida in Spain, and the parishes of La Massana, Andorra La Vella, Sant Julià de Lòria, Escaldes-Engordany and Encamp.

This border is a hotspot for smuggling, because of the cheapness of tobacco in Andorra.

=== Spain–Morocco border ===
The autonomous cities of Ceuta and Melilla, and the Peñón de Vélez de la Gomera make the border with Morocco, which is 19 km long.

The borders of Ceuta and Melilla, are de facto, because between them and Morocco there is no man's land. The only real border would be the 27 meters long one in the Peñón de Vélez de la Gomera.

=== Spain–Gibraltar border ===
The Spain–Gibraltar border is 1.2 km long and connects the British Overseas Territory of Gibraltar and the Spanish municipality of La Línea de la Concepción.

== Crossing points ==
=== (Basque Country (autonomous community)) Basque Country ===
==== Province of Gipuzkoa ====
Location	Road or facility
(Spain) Fuenterrabía- (France) Hendaye	Transborder ferry
(Spain) Irún- (France) Hendaye	Conventional railway
(Spain) Irún- (France) Hendaye	Narrow-gauge railway (Euskotren)
(Spain) Irún- (France) Hendaye	Avenida de Iparralde – Avenue d'Espagne
(Spain) Irún- (France) Hendaye	N-Ia - D912
(Spain) Behovia- (France) Béhobie (Urrugne)	N-I - N10
(Spain) Behovia- (France) Biriatou	A-8 - A63

=== Navarre ===
Location	Road or facility
(Spain) Vera de Bidasoa- (France) Herboure (Urrugne)	NA-1310 - D404
(Spain) Vera de Bidasoa- (France) Sare	NA-4410 - D406
(Spain) Gorosurreta (Etxalar)- (France) Sare	NA-4400 - D306
(Spain) Errotaxaharrea (Baztán)- (France) Garbala (Sare)	Rural track
(Spain) Behereko Benta (Baztán)- (France) Harotxarenborda (Sare)	Rural track
(Spain) Gaineko Benta (Baztán)- (France) Martienekoborda (Sare)	Rural track
(Spain) Galtzagorri Benta (Baztán)- (France) Lekaienborda (Sare)	Rural track
(Spain) Loribenta (Baztán)- (France) Etxegaraikoborda (Sare)	Rural track
(Spain) Dancharinea (Urdax)- (France) Dantxaria (Ainhoa)	N-121-B - D20
(Spain) Erratzu (Baztán)- (France) Baigorri	NA-2600 - D949
(Spain) Eugi (Zubiri)- (France) Urepel	NA-138 - D58
(Spain) Pallaren Borda (Baztán)- (France) Larrategia (Urepel)	Rural track - D158
(Spain) Edarreta (Valcarlos)- (France) Karrikaburua (Lasse)	Rural track
(Spain) Valcarlos- (France) La Route d'Arnéguy (Arnéguy)	Rural track - D933
(Spain) Valcarlos- (France) La Route d'Arnéguy (Arnéguy)	Rural track - D933
(Spain) Pekotxeta (Valcarlos)- (France) Arnéguy	N-135 - D933
(Spain) Pekotxeta (Valcarlos)- (France) Arnéguy	N-135 - D933
(Spain) Pantano de Irabia (Irati Forest)- (France) Egurguy (Lecumberry)	Rural track
(Spain) Izalzu- (France) Larrau	NA-2011 - D26
(Spain) Belagua Valley (Isaba)- (France) Arette	NA-1370 - D132

=== Aragon ===
==== Province of Huesca ====
Location	Road or facility
(Spain) Canfranc- (France) Forges d'Abel (Urdos)	N-330 - N134
(Spain) Canfranc- (France) Forges d'Abel (Urdos)	N-330a - N134
(Spain) Formigal (Sallent de Gállego)- (France) Pont de Camps (Laruns)	A-136 - D934
(Spain) Hospital de Parzán (Bielsa)- (France) Aragnouet	A-138 - D929

=== Catalonia ===
==== Province of Lleida ====
Location	Road or facility
(Spain) Bossost- (France) Saint-Mamet and Bagnères-de-Luchon	N-141 - D618
(Spain) Bausen- (France) Fos	N-230 - N125
(Spain) Bausen- (France) Fos	N-230 - N125
(Spain) Tor (Alins)- (Andorra) Pal (La Massana)	Rural track - CG-4
(Spain) Os de Civís- (Andorra) Bixessarri (San Julià de Lòria)	Rural track - CS-110
(Spain) Civís (Les Valls de Valira)- (Andorra) Fontaneda (San Julià de Lòria)	Rural track - CS-111
(Spain) Arduix (Les Valls de Valira)- (Andorra) Sant Esteve-Mas d'Alins (San Julià de Lòria)	Rural track - CS-142
(Spain) Anserall y La Seu d'Urgel- (Andorra) San Julià de Lòria	N-145 - CG-1

==== Province of Girona ====
Location	Road or facility
(Spain) La Fleca Vella (Puigcerdá)- (France) La Vinyola (Enveitg)	Rural track - D34
(Spain) Puigcerdá- (France) Enveitg	Barcelona-Puigcerdá-France international rail line
(Spain) Puigcerdá- (France) Cámping L'Aiglon (Ur)	N-152 - D68
(Spain) Llívia- (France) La Joncassa and La Prada de Càldegues (Ur)	N-152 - D68
(Spain) Llívia- (France) Estavar	Rural track
(Spain) Llívia- (France) Estavar	Avinguda dels Països Catalans – Route de Llivia
(Spain) Gorguja (Llívia)- (France) Ro (Saillagouse)	N-154 - D33C
(Spain) Puigcerdà- (France) Bourg-Madame	N-152 - N20 ( E-9 )
(Spain) Age- (France) Palau de Cerdanya (Osséja)	GIV-4037 - D70a
(Spain) Molló- (France) Prats de Molló	C-38 - D115
(Spain) Tapis (Maçanet de Cabrenys)- (France) Coustouges	GI-505 - D3
(Spain) La Vajol- (France) Maureillas-las-Illas	GI-503 - D13
(Spain) Els Límits (La Jonquera)- (France) Le Perthus	Perpignan-Barcelona high-speed rail line
(Spain) Els Límits (La Jonquera)- (France) Le Perthus	N-II - N9
(Spain) Els Límits (La Jonquera)- (France) Le Perthus	AP-7 - A9 ( E-15 )
(Spain) Espolla- (France) Banyuls-sur-Mer	Rural route
(Spain) Portbou- (France) Cerbère	N-260 - N114
(Spain) Portbou- (France) Cerbère	Conventional railway

=== (Galicia (Spain)) Galicia ===
==== Province of Pontevedra ====
Location	Road or facility
(Spain) Camposancos (A Guarda)- (Portugal) Caminha	Transborder ferry Camposancos – Caminha
(Spain) Goián (Tomiño)- (Portugal) Vila Nova de Cerveira	PO-553 - EN13
(Spain) Tui- (Portugal) Valença do Minho	Vigo-Tui-Porto international rail line
(Spain) Tui- (Portugal) Valença do Minho	A-55 - A3 ( E-01 )
(Spain) Tui- (Portugal) Valença do Minho	N-551 - EN13
(Spain) Salvatierra de Miño- (Portugal) Monção	PO-510 - N-202
(Spain) Arbo- (Portugal) Melgaço	PO-405 - M1147

==== Province of Ourense ====
Location	Road or facility
(Spain) Manzalvos (La Mezquita)- (Portugal) Moimenta	OU-311 - 308
(Spain) A Esculqueira (La Mezquita)- (Portugal) Pinheiro Novo	Rural track - 509
(Spain) Barxa (La Gudiña)- (Portugal) Quirás	Rural track - 1001
(Spain) Soutochao (Vilardevós)- (Portugal) Vilar Seco de Lomba	OU-310 - 1053
(Spain) Terroso (Vilardevós)- (Portugal) São Vicente	Rural track
(Spain) Arzádegos (Vilardevós)- (Portugal) Travancas	Rural track
(Spain) Mandín (Verín)- (Portugal) Lama de Arcos	Rural track
(Spain) Feces de Abajo (Verín)- (Portugal) Vila Verde da Raia (Chaves)	N-532 - 103-5 ( E-801 )
(Spain) Rabal (Oimbra)- (Portugal) Vilarelho da Raia	Rural track
(Spain) San Cibrao (Oimbra)- (Portugal) Vilarelho da Raia	Rural track
(Spain) San Cibrao (Oimbra)- (Portugal) Cambedo (Chaves)	Rural track
(Spain) Videferre (Oimbra)- (Portugal) Soutelinho da Raia	Rural track
(Spain) A Xironda (Cualedro)- (Portugal) Vilar de Perdizes	Rural track
(Spain) A Xironda (Cualedro)- (Portugal) Santo André	Rural track
(Spain) Baltar- (Portugal) Montalegre	OU-304
(Spain) Calvos de Randín- (Portugal) Tourém	OU-302 - 513
(Spain) Guntumil (Muiños)- (Portugal) Tourém	Rural track
(Spain) Requiás (Muiños)- (Portugal) Pitões das Júnias	Rural track
(Spain) Torneiros (Lobios)- (Portugal) Campo do Gerês (Terras de Bouro)	OU-312 - 308-1
(Spain) Manín (Lobios)- (Portugal) Lindoso	N-540
(Spain) Guxinde (Entrimo)- (Portugal) Ameijoeira (Castro Laboreiro)	OU-540 - 202-3
(Spain) Xacebás (Quintela de Leirado)- (Portugal) Rodeiro (Castro Laboreiro)	Rural track
(Spain) Padrenda- (Portugal) Alcobaça (Lamas de Mouro)	Rural track - 1138
(Spain) Cela de Arriba (Padrenda)- (Portugal) A-da-Velha (Fiães)	Rural track - 1138-4
(Spain) Cela de Abaixo (Padrenda)- (Portugal) Congosta (Fiães)	Rural track - 1138-4
(Spain) A Embalsada (Padrenda)- (Portugal) A Balsada (Fiães)	Rural track - 1138
(Spain) Ponte Barxas (Padrenda)- (Portugal) Cristoval (Melgaço)	OU-410 - 301
(Spain) Acivido (Padrenda)- (Portugal) A Cevide (Melgaço)	Rural track

=== Castile and León ===
==== Province of Zamora ====
Location	Road or facility
(Spain) Calabor- (Portugal) França	ZA-925 - IP 2
(Spain) Rihonor de Castilla- (Portugal) Rio de Onor	ZA-921 - N 308
(Spain) Riomanzanas- (Portugal) Guadramil	ZA-P-2438 - N 308
(Spain) Villarino de Manzanas- (Portugal) Petisqueira	Vía local - M 1039
(Spain) San Martín del Pedroso- (Portugal) Quintanilha	N-122 - E-82 -
(Spain) Villarino Tras La Sierra- (Portugal) Trabazos	ZA-V-2425 - M 542
(Spain) Alcañices- (Portugal) Avelanoso	ZA-L-2440 - M 546
(Spain) Moveros-Constantim	ZA-L-2435 - M 1201
(Spain) Brandilanes- (Portugal) Ifanes	ZA-L-2433 - M 542
(Spain) Castro de Alcañices- (Portugal) Paradela	ZA-L-2432 - M 542-1
(Spain) Torregamones- (Portugal) Miranda do Douro	ZA-324 - N 218
(Spain) Fermoselle- (Portugal) Bemposta	CL-527 - N 221-7

=== Andalusia ===
==== Province of Huelva ====
Location	Road or Facility
(Spain) Encinasola- (Portugal) Barrancos	HU-9101 – N258
(Spain) Rosal de la Frontera- (Portugal) Sobral da Adiça	Rural track
(Spain) Rosal de la Frontera- (Portugal) Vila Verde de Ficalho	N-433 - IP8
(Spain) Paymogo- (Portugal) São Marcos (Vila Nova de São Bento)	HU-7400 - Rural track
(Spain) Santa Catalina (El Granado)- (Portugal) Pomarão (Santana de Cambas)	HU-6400 - Rural track
(Spain) Ayamonte- (Portugal) Castro Marim	A-49 - A 22 ( E-1 )
(Spain) Ayamonte- (Portugal) Vila Real de Santo António	Transborder ferry

==== Province of Cádiz ====
Location	Road or facility
(Spain) La Línea de la Concepción- (United Kingdom) Gibraltar	N-351 - Winston Churchill Avenue

=== Ceuta ===
Location	Road or facility
(Spain) Benzú- (Morocco) Beliones	N-354 - P-4703
(Spain) Ceuta- (Morocco) Fnideq	N-352 - P-28

=== Melilla ===
Location	Road or Facility
(Spain) Melilla- (Morocco) Beni Ansar	Avenida de Europa – N-19
(Spain) Melilla- (Morocco) Haddú	ML-105 - Rural track
(Spain) Melilla- (Morocco) Farkhana	ML-101 - Rural track
(Spain) Melilla- (Morocco) Idoudouhen	ML-300 - Rural track
