= France–Spain border =

International border

- The border, as seen on the map

Characteristics
- Entities: France Spain
- Length: 685,42 km (425,9 miles)
- Enclave and exclaves: Llívia, Spain

History
- Treaties: Treaty of the Pyrenees, 1659; 367 years ago
- Notes: Pheasant Island is currently part of France from 1 August to 31 January (Will be part of Spain from 1 February to 31 July)

The France–Spain border was formally defined in 1659. It separates the two countries from the Basque cities of Hendaye and Irun in the west, running through the Pyrenees to Cerbère and Portbou on the Mediterranean Sea. It runs roughly along the drainage divide defined by the Pyrenees, though with several exceptions.

== Features ==
=== Main border ===
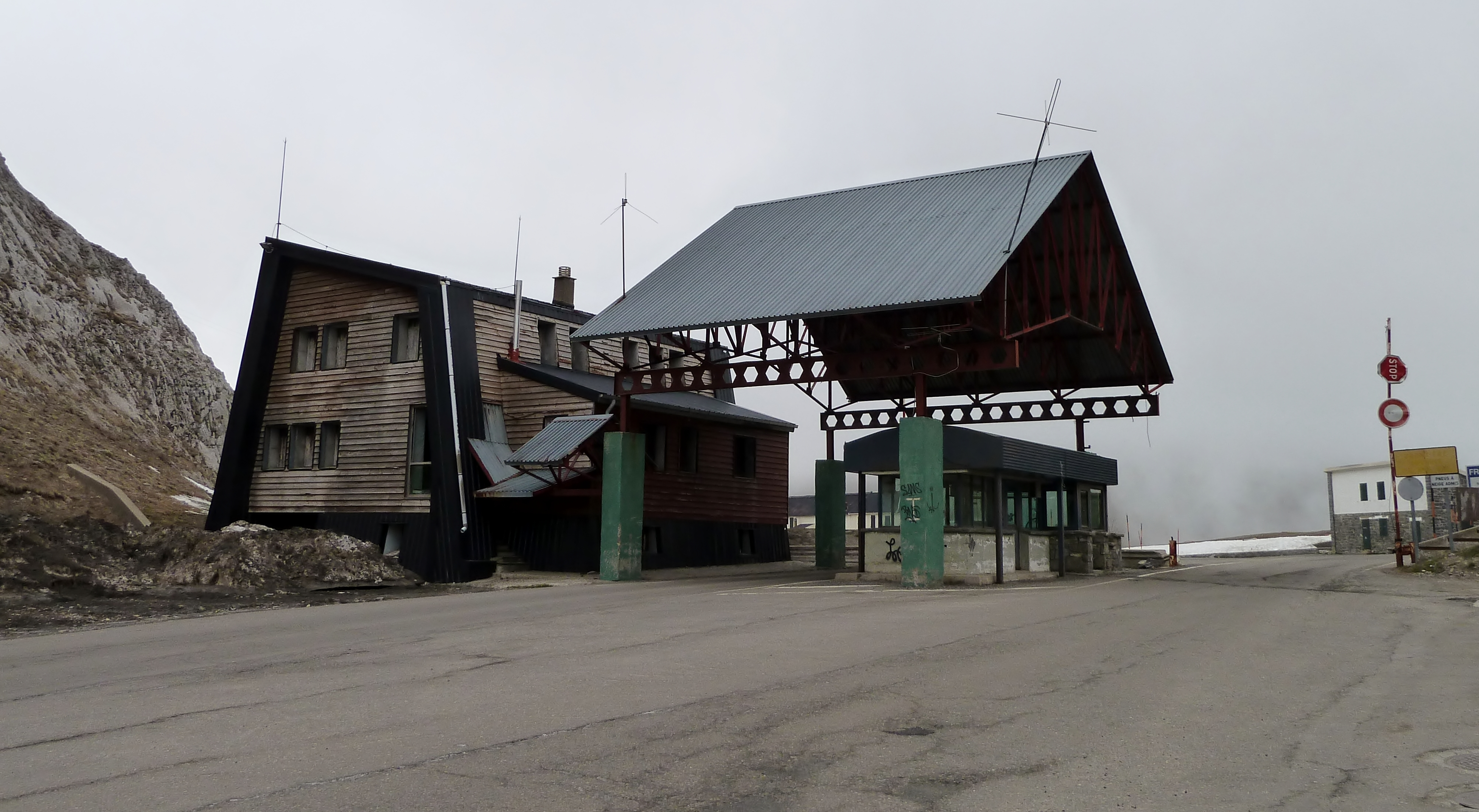
The border between France and Spain in Portalet d'Aneu

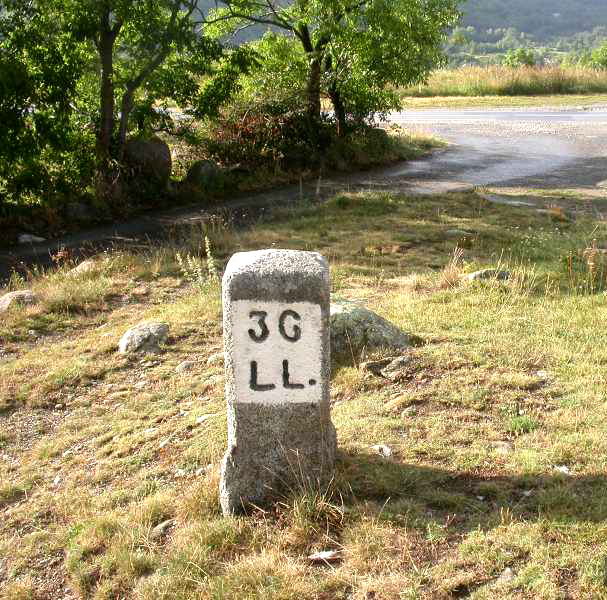
Marker indicating the border between France and Spain, in the towns of Llivia (Girona) and Angoustrine-Villeneuve-des-Escaldes (Pyrénées-Orientales)

The Franco-Spanish border runs for 685.42 kilometres (425.90 mi) between southwestern France and northeastern Spain. It begins in the west on the Bay of Biscay at the French city of Hendaye and the Spanish city of Irun (43°22′32″N 01°47′31″W). The border continues eastward along the Pyrenees to the sovereign nation of Andorra (42°36′13″N 1°26′30″E). At this point, the small country interrupts the border between Spain and France for 63.7 kilometres (39.6 mi) on the Spanish side and 56 kilometres (35 mi) on the French side. Then the border continues eastward (42°30′09″N 01°43′34″E) to the Mediterranean Sea at Cerbère in France and Portbou in Spain (42°26′09″N 03°10′26″E). The perimeter of the Llívia enclave is also included.

From west to east, crossing the border:

Spain

- Gipuzkoa (Basque Country)
- Navarre
- Province of Huesca (Aragon)
- Province of Lleida (Catalonia)
- Province of Girona (Catalonia)

France

- Pyrénées-Atlantiques (Nouvelle-Aquitaine)
- Hautes-Pyrénées (Occitanie)
- Haute-Garonne (Occitanie)
- Ariège (Occitanie)
- Pyrénées-Orientales (Occitanie)

=== Llívia ===
Spain has an exclave in France, Llívia, in the Pyrénées-Orientales.

=== Pheasant Island ===
Near the western end of the border, following the course of the river Bidasoa, Pheasant Island (located in the middle of the river) currently part of France, has an unusual border regime: the island is a condominium whose sovereignty is shared between the two countries: France from 1 August to 31 January, and Spain from in 1 February to 31 July.

== History ==
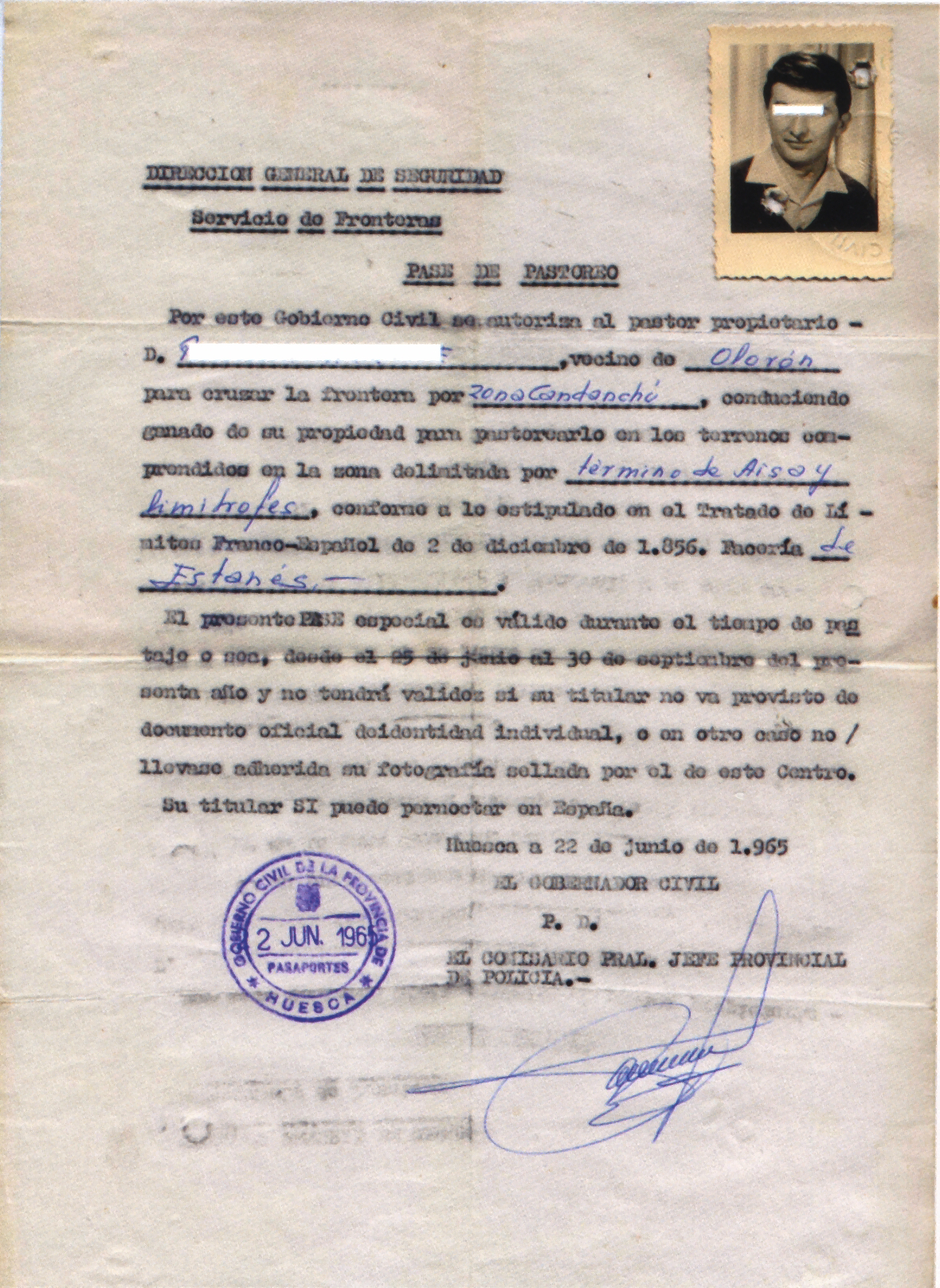
Border pass for Spanish farmers to access their fields on the French side, as agreed in the Bayonne treaties 1856 and 1862. Type shown introduced 1949, this pass issued 1965.

=== Background ===
The formal layout of the Franco-Spanish border dates back to the signing of the Treaty of the Pyrenees between the kingdoms of Spain and France in 1659. This was followed by the Treaty of Llivia the following year, which transferred to France the sovereignty of several villages in the valley of Querol.

Later there were some further agreements covering specific areas:

- the agreement signed in Perpignan in 1764, which established the boundaries between Empordà and Coll Pertús and
- the Elizondo Treaty in 1785 establishing limits on the height of Aldudes is demarcated and Valcarlos.

=== Bayonne Treaties ===
The final definition, which for the most part is still in force, is set out in the Bayonne Treaties between 1856 and 1868. During the mandates of Queen Isabel II and the French emperor Napoleon III, several agreements were signed between the two countries by which the border was established:

- The treaty of 1856, establishing the boundary between the provinces of Guipuzcoa is demarcated and Navarre.
- The treaty of 1862, which marked the boundaries in the provinces of Huesca and Lleida.
- The treaty of 1866, which did the same from the valley of Andorra to the Mediterranean Sea.
- Final Act of borders, signed in 1868.

=== Subsequent amendments ===
Later both countries concluded agreements under the same point. In 1980 an agreement was signed to define the border into the Bielsa-Aragnouet tunnel, and 1984, during the construction of the road linking the Roncal Valley with Arette, a mutual transfer of land of 2710 m^{2} (29,170 sq ft) was agreed.

In 1995, with the entry into force of the Schengen Agreement, border controls for people and goods were abolished, thus ensuring freedom of movement across the border. A number of disused border stations remain.

== Marking ==
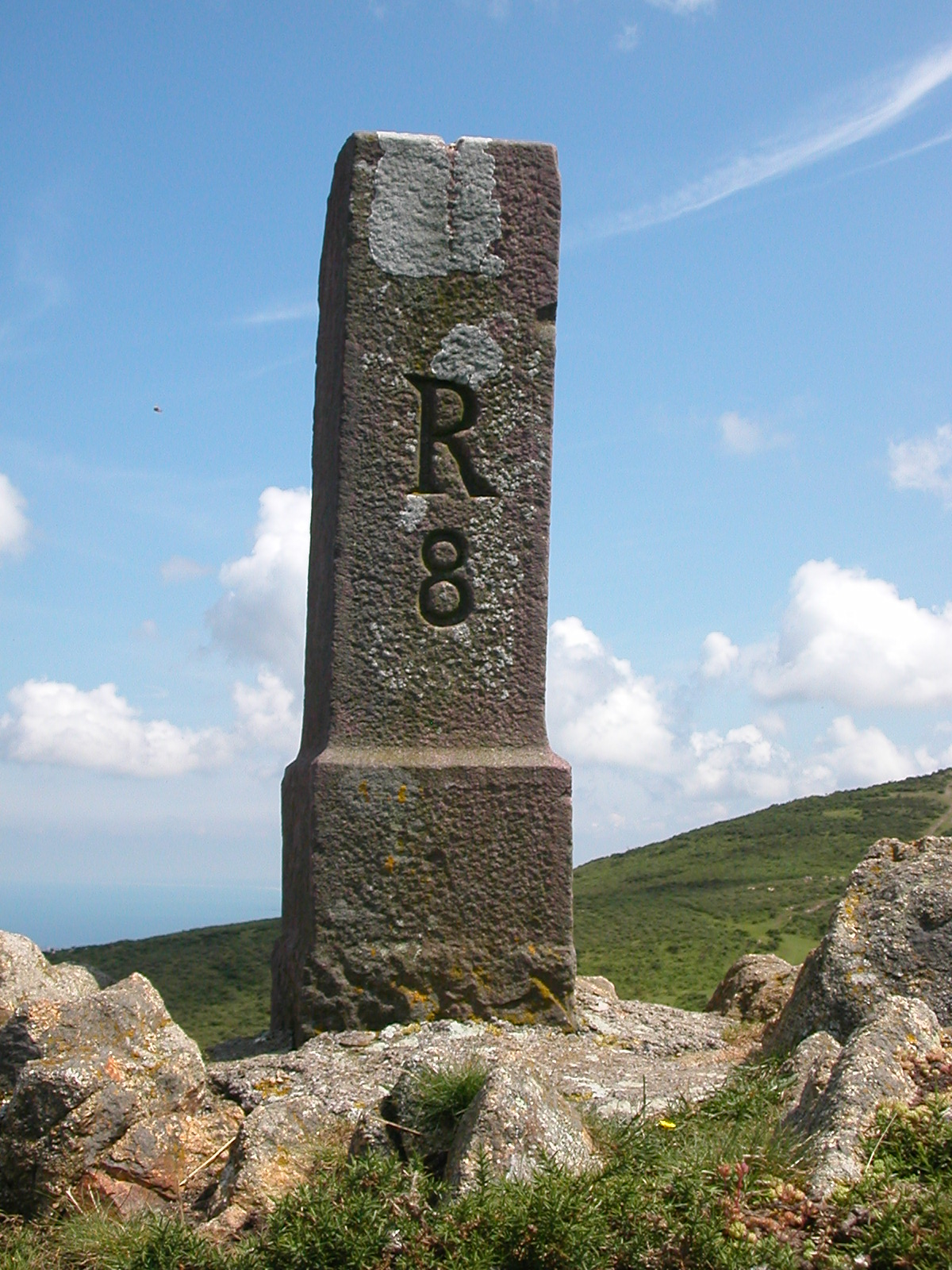
A border marker between Vera de Bidasoa and Biriatou

Following the provisions of the treaties of Bayonne, the border is physically marked on the ground by 602 cairns showing the division between the two countries. These markers are numbered from west to east: the first located on the Bidasoa and the last in Cap Cerbère, marked with consecutive numbers and letters.

Another 45 cairns mark the border around Llivia; they are numbered anticlockwise from the number 1 at the entrance of the French road RD-68 into the enclave. Maintaining this signaling runs either on behalf of both states.

== Crossings ==
Poster entry to Spain

Poster entry to France

- Irun / Hendaye
- Ibardin
- Larrún
- Coll de Banyuls
- Col de Lizuniaga
- Col de Lizarrieta
- Ainhoa / Urdax
- Col d'Iguskiegui
- Col d'Ispeguy
- Col d'Esnazu
- Valcarlos / Arnéguy
- Port of Larrau
- Col de la Pierre Saint-Martin
- Pas d'Arlas
- Somport
- Col du Pourtalet
- Port of Boucharo
- Aragnouet–Bielsa Tunnel
- Col du Portillon
- Pont du Roi
- Puigcerdà / Bourg-Madame
- Col d'Ares
- Col du Perthus
- Col des Balistres (Portbou / Cerbère)
