= Paradela =

Paradela may refer to

Places in Portugal

- Paradela (Barcelos), a civil parish in the municipality of Barcelos
- Paradela (Chaves), a civil parish in the municipality of Chaves
- Paradela (Miranda do Douro), a civil parish in the municipality of Miranda do Douro
- Paradela (Mogadouro), a civil parish in the municipality of Mogadouro
- Paradela (Montalegre), a civil parish in the municipality of Montalegre
- Paradela (Penacova), a civil parish in the municipality of Penacova
- Paradela (Sever do Vouga), a civil parish in the municipality of Sever do Vouga
- Paradela (Tabuaço), a civil parish in the municipality of Tabuaço

Other

- Paradela (surname)
- Paradela, Lugo, a municipality in Galicia, Spain
