= Constantim =

Constantim may refer to the following places in Portugal:

- Constantim (Miranda do Douro), a former parish in the municipality of Miranda do Douro
- Constantim (Vila Real), a former parish in the municipality of Vila Real

== See also ==
- Constantim e Cicouro, a parish in the municipality of Miranda do Douro
