= A138 =

A138 may refer to:

- A138 road (England), a road around Chelmsford
- A-138 motorway (Spain), a road in Aragon connecting France at the Tunnel of Bieisa with Barbastro and the N-240
