= Fiães =

Fiães may refer to the following places in Portugal:

- Fiães (Melgaço), a parish in the municipality of Melgaço
- Fiães (Santa Maria da Feira), a parish in the municipality of Santa Maria da Feira
- Fiães (Trancoso), a parish in the municipality of Trancoso
- Fiães (Valpaços), a parish in the municipality of Valpaços
- Fiães do Rio, a parish in the municipality of Montalegre

== Other ==
- Fiães Sport Clube, a sporting club played in the parish of Fiaes in the municipality of Santa Maria da Feira
