= N-152 road (Spain) =

National road in Spain

National road N-152
- Carretera nacional N-152

Major junctions
- From: Puigcerda
- To: French frontier

Location
- Country: Spain

Highway system
- Highways in Spain; Autopistas and autovías; National Roads

The N-152 is a Spanish national road in Catalonia, Spain, which originally linked Barcelona with the French border at Puigcerda/Bourg-Madame, in the eastern Pyrenees. As of today, less than 2 km remain as a connection from Puigcerdà to the French border.

The Barcelona-Ripoll section was transferred to the Generalitat de Catalunya in 1980 (government of Catalonia), and therefore its name changed to C-17 in 1990 due to the new codification for catalan roads.

The Ripoll-Puigcerdà section was renamed to N-260 in 2006 to complete the entire Pyrenaean Axis from Portbou to Sabiñánigo. It used to pass through La Molina and Ribes de Freser, and over the Collada de Tosas mountain pass.
