= Ifanes e Paradela =

- Civil parish
- Location in Portugal
- Country: Portugal
- Region: Norte
- Intermunic. comm.: Terras de Trás-os-Montes
- District: Bragança
- Municipality: Miranda do Douro

Area
  - Total: 44.70 km^{2} (17.26 sq mi)

Population (2011)
  - Total: 325
  - Density: 7.27/km^{2} (18.8/sq mi)
- Time zone: UTC+00:00 (WET)
  - Summer (DST): UTC+01:00 (WEST)

Ifanes e Paradela (Portuguese pronunciation: [iˈfɐ.nɨʃ ˈi pɐ.ɾɐˈðɛlɐ]) (Mirandese: Anfainç i Paradela, Mirandese pronunciation: [ãˈfãj̃s̻ ˈi pa.ɾaˈðe.la]) is a civil parish in the municipality of Miranda do Douro, Portugal. It was formed in 2013 by the merger of the former parishes Ifanes and Paradela. The population in 2011 was 325, in an area of 44.70 km².
