= Cicouro =

- Civil parish
- Location in Portugal
- Coordinates: 41°38′44″N 6°17′37″W
- Country: Portugal
- Region: Norte
- Intermunic. comm.: Terras de Trás-os-Montes
- District: Bragança
- Municipality: Miranda do Douro
- Disbanded: 28 January 2013

Area
  - Total: 14.51 km^{2} (5.60 sq mi)

Population (2011)
  - Total: 95
  - Density: 6.5/km^{2} (17/sq mi)
- Time zone: UTC+00:00 (WET)
  - Summer (DST): UTC+01:00 (WEST)

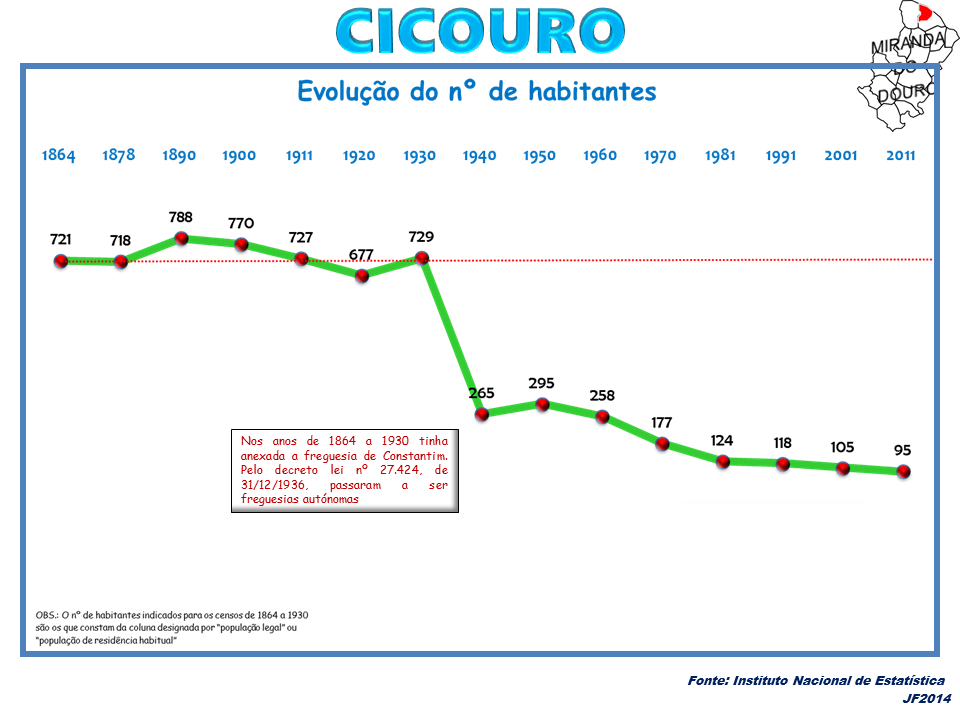

Cicouro is a former parish in the municipality of Miranda do Douro, Portugal. The population in 2011 was 95, in an area of 14.51 km^{2}. In 2013, the parish merged with Constantim to form the new parish Constantim e Cicouro.
