= Church of Santo André (Melgaço) =

- Parochial Church of Fiães
- Igreja de Santo André
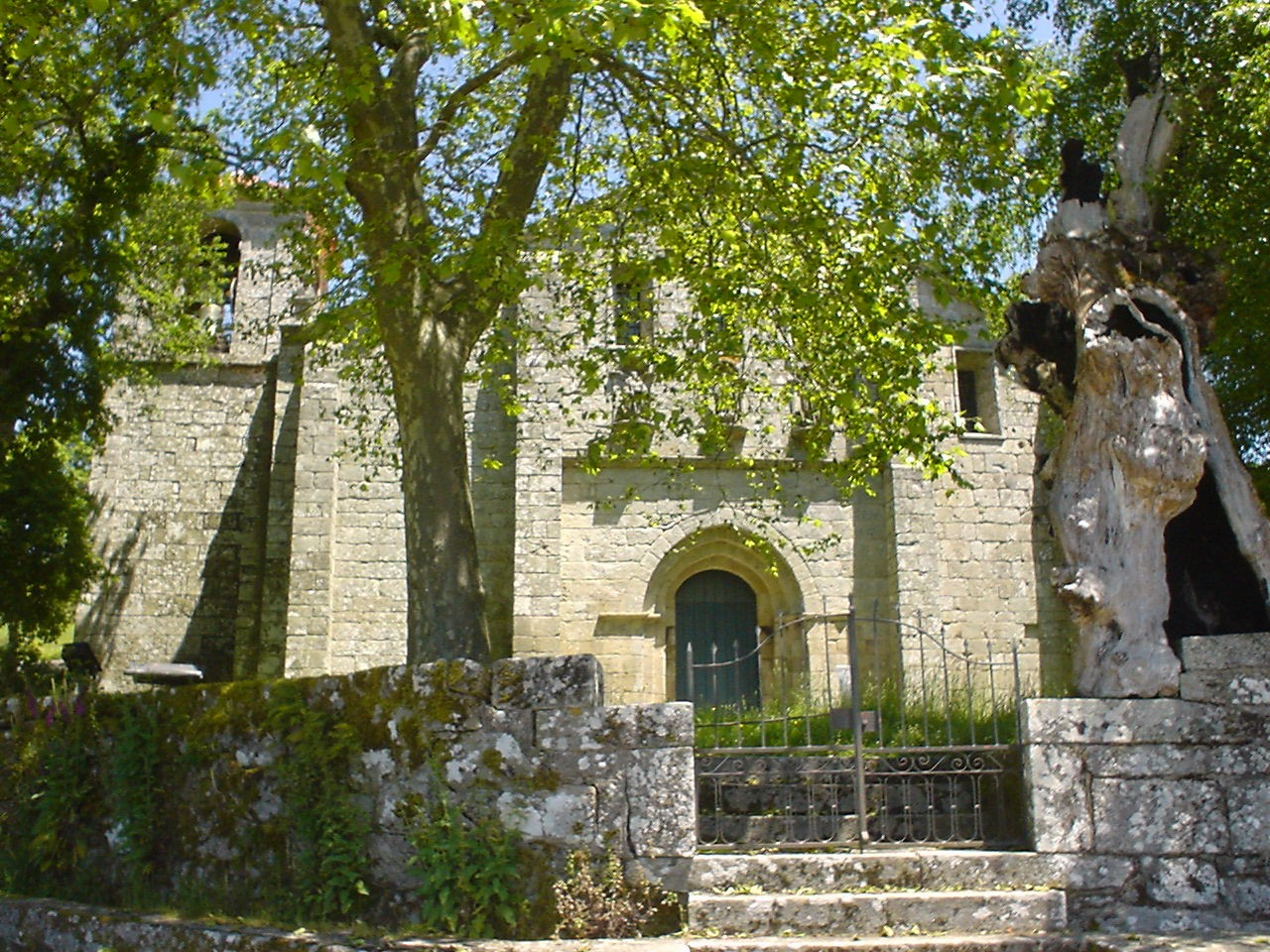
- The front facade as seen from the roadway, showing its seclusion
- Church of Santo André
- 42°6′14.53″N 8°12′40.09″W
- Location: Viana do Castelo, Alto Minho, Norte
- Country: Portugal
- Denomination: Roman Catholic

History
- Dedication: Saint Andrew the Apostle

Architecture
- Style: Romanesque, Baroque, Mannerism

Specifications
- Length: 28.23 m (92.6 ft)
- Width: 28.62 m (93.9 ft)

The Church of Santo André (Portuguese: Mosteiro de Fiães/Igreja Paroquial de Fiães/Igreja de Santo André) is a Romanesque and Baroque era Portuguese religious building located in the civil parish of Fiães, municipality of Melgaço, in the northern Portuguese district of Viana do Castelo.

Originally a Roman-Cistercian monastery, it was remodeled during the 17th and early 18th century in the Baroque style, but still exemplifies many of the characteristics of the early building (typifying the Galician Cistercian monasteries and Minhota churches of the time). The beginning of 17th century remodeling began with images of the patron saints and coat-of-arms on the frontispiece, but later extended into the lateral altar (Mannerist) and the chancel retable (Baroque).

== History ==
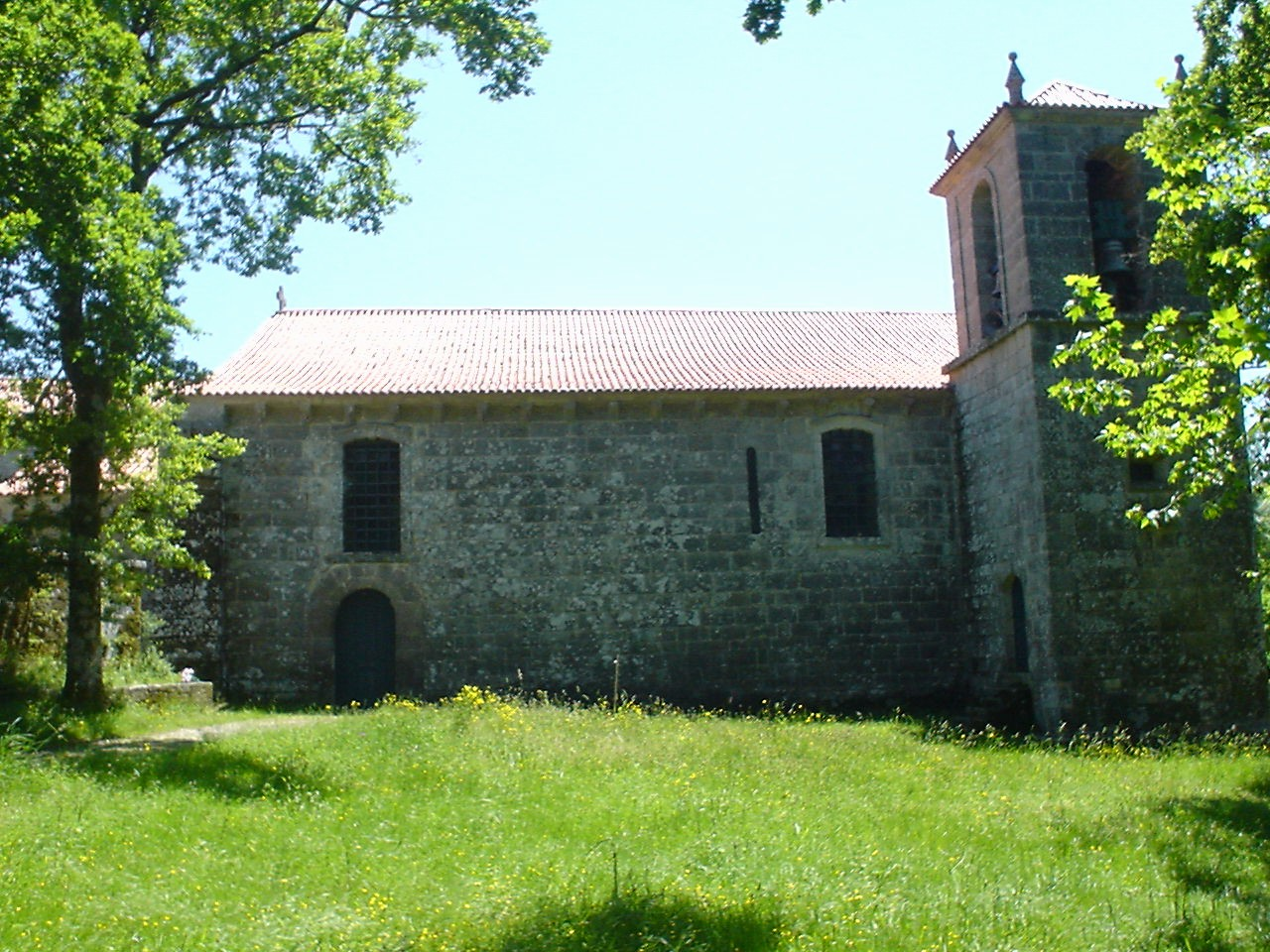
Western profile of the church, with the inset belltower and front facade (to the right)

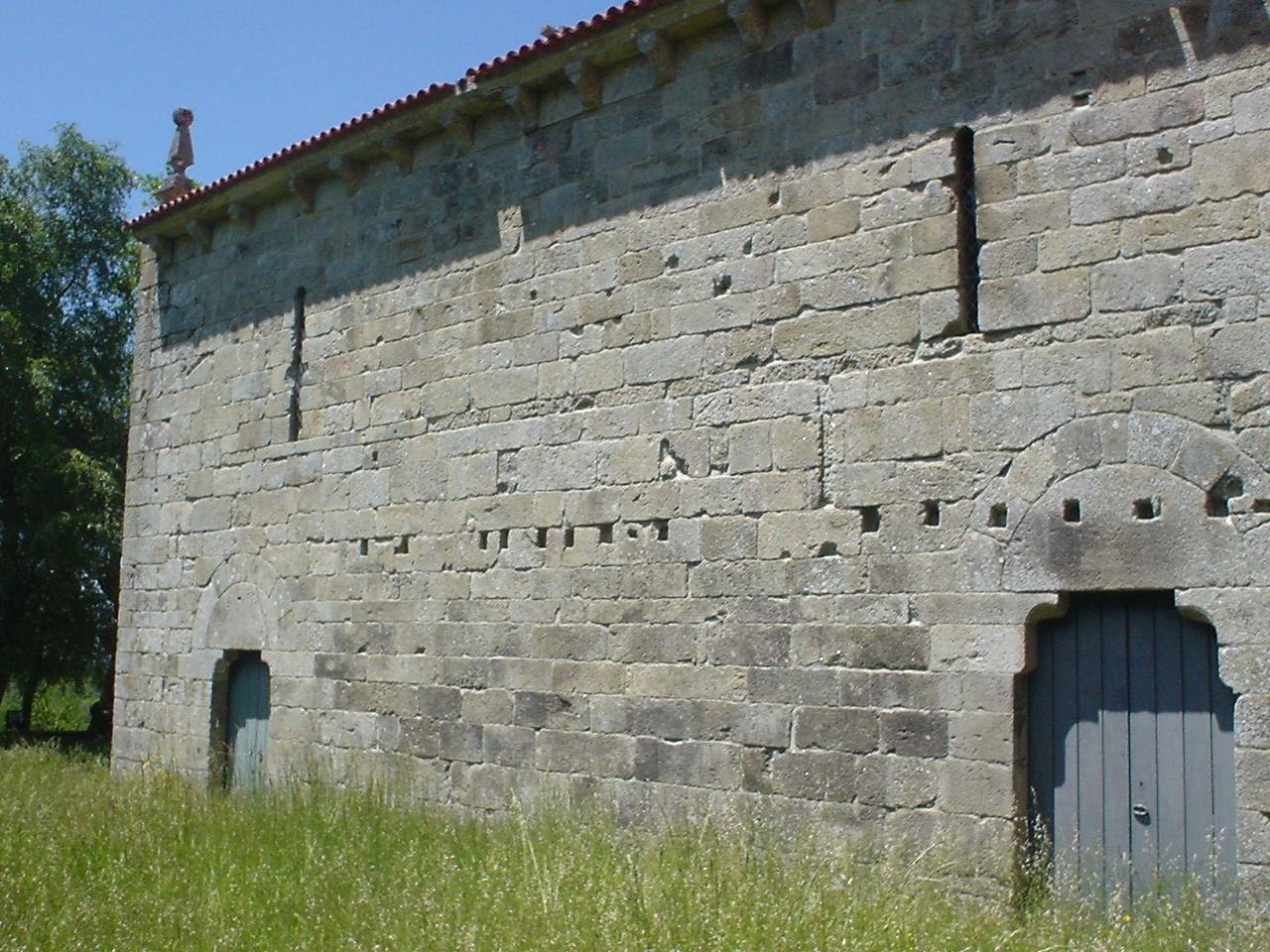
The lateral facade (left), showing the holes that supported beams from the historical cloister

Records from 815, as suggested by J. Augusto Vieira, already indicated that a convent existed on the site during the era of Ramiro II of León and D. Paterna. By 870, the church was constructed (as stated in the chronicles of Father António da Purificação).

By the 11th century, there were rare references to a religious building in Fiães, usually referring to a Benedictine monastery who received several donations and active business (exchanges and purchases). In 1142, Fernando Tedão was a principal orator and eventually left behind many of his property to the church. Afonso Henriques also donated property and chattel that he owned in Melgaço (most notably in the area of Chaviães), which included the lands of Senhora da Orada, but which were later occupied by King Sancho in 1199.

Maur de Chocheril, in 1194, recorded that the clergy at the convent adopted the Cistercian religious order, aligning themselves to their brethren at the abbey of São João de Tarouca. In 1210 João Raimundo and his mother donated lands in Doma, on the frontier with Cristóval, and later supported the Order's public works the following year with donations to their projects. The wealth of the Convent of Fiães was so great that a popular refrain existed that "after the King, there was no one as rich as the abbot of Fiães". An accord between the convent and municipality of Melgaço in 1245 established a cost-sharing agreement for the maintenance of the wall around the city. The clergy at the time could afford to be generous, records from 1320 showed that the convent produced 400 pounds from lands rents.

In the 14th century, the tomb of Fernão Anes de Lima was installed at the church.

In 1490, a fire in the archives resulted in an unmeasurable damage to many of the church's records.

The first record of a restoration dates to around 1530, when abbot João de Cós ordered the restoration of the Church, the abbey's residences, cloister and meeting hall. These renovations were important, for in January 1533, the convent was visited by the abbey of Claraval, Edme de Saulieu and his secretary, Cláudio de Bronseval. Yet, many of the early projects were left uncompleted at the time of their arrival, including the cloister (which was in ruins). Successive restoration or expansion were completed in the 17th and 18th century, including the restoration of the interior and frontispiece and the opening of two great windows on the northern facade, as well as the construction of the belltower.

By the end of the 16th century, there were 20 abbots represented at the convent.

In 1730, Colonel Francisco Ayres de Vasconcelos ordered recruitment of soldiers on the grounds of Fiães couto (a privileged area immune from taxes and royal justice), which was seen as an afront to the religious orders. The site was also the stage for a later royal order from King John V of Portugal, who summoned all the governors to the plaza to show their respect to the privileges of the grounds. Yet, in 1777, the convent complained to the Captain-Major of Valadares that generals and governors of the local fortifications used carts of parishioners for public works projects in the fortresses.

With the extinction of the Religious Orders (1834), the convent was sold to the public and the temple became a parochial church. The remaining dependencies slowly slid into ruins, with little attention paid to these shelters. On 6 November 1836, the couto was extinguished and the lands incorporated into the municipality of Melgaço. A cross was erected on the grounds in 1875. By 1903, the right facade of the convent still remained intact. The original 1910 decree was intended to classify the churchyard as a National Monument (Portuguese: Monumento Nacional), but was elaborated in 1977 to include the Church, its contents and any of the remnants of the ancient convent.

The abbot travelled to France (1955) to visit former parishioners, and to collect donations to purchase bells for the convent, conclude the public works on the parochial residence and build a tower to the Chapel of Adedele.

The first organized interventions made on the church and remnants of the convent began with the 1958 restoration of the roof and consolidation of the walls, completed by the DGEMN Direcção-Geral dos Edifícios e Monumentos Nacionais (General-Directorate for Buildings and National Monuments) in 1958. This was followed by formal restoration in 1959–1960; reconstruction of the sacristy and western/southern walls in 1961–1962; and finally the reconstruction of the southern wall and frontispiece in 1963. A new phase of restoration and consolidation began in the 1970s with the southwest corner and roofing, and weathering problems caused by a storms in 1972, which were supported in 1974 by new roofing of the central nave. Minor replacements of doors and windows throughout the church progressed in the intervening years, along with other projects, culminating in the drainage of the posterior facade in 1977. Conservation projects began in 1982, 1989, 1990, 1993 and 1989 to benefit its historical and touristic importance, with a general review of elements in granite, pavement, structural and decorative elements, the cleaning of many of the interior and exterior decoration, treatment of the main beams, the revision and installation of electrical outlets and improvements on the exterior of the building, which included the consolidation of the exterior wall and the construction of an access-way staircase in Portuguese-style calçada.

Following the re-roofing of the church, new restorations were accompanied by archaeologists from the University of Minho, under a protocol with the DGMEN. During the opening of drainage perimeter, the archaeologists discovered an older dis-activated channel system, that ran along the principal facade of the church along with an older calçada pavement, which was conserved, eliminating the need for further drainage projects.

== Architecture ==
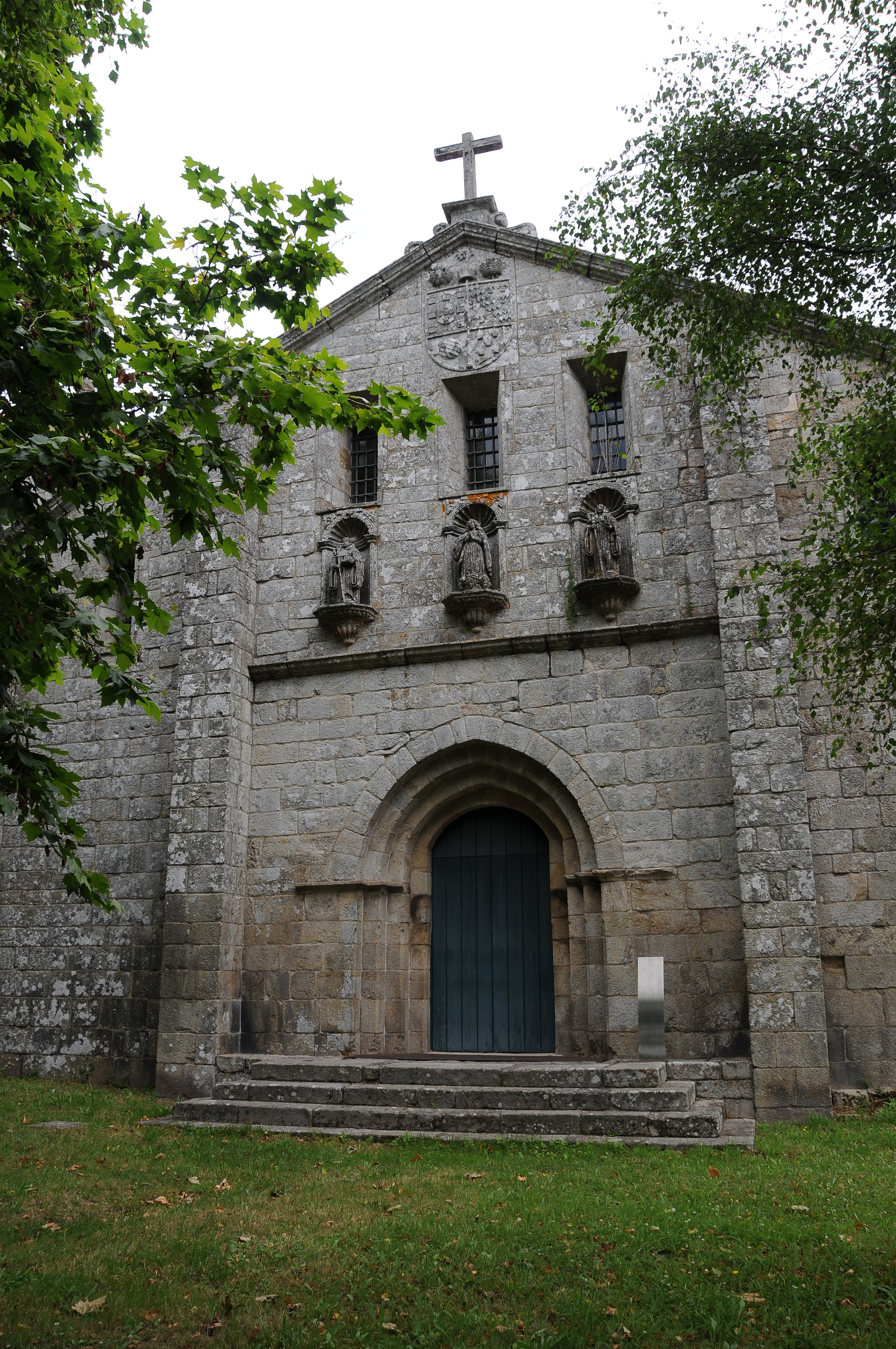
The front facade of the Church of Fiães, showing the three long windows and pediments with images of saints

The Church of Fiães is situated in an isolated rural environment, along the flanks of the Serra da Peneda, at about 700 metres above sea level. The ample churchyard includes a cross, and is inserted within a small agricultural tract encircled by oak and chestnut trees.

The church is composed in a longitudinal plan, with three naves and four sections, with three rectangular chapels, inset rectangular bell-tower crowned with pinnacles (on the north facade) and sacristy (in the southern facade) with the articulated spaces covered in tile. Typically, the Cistercian Romanesque churches had three square chapels with vaulted ceilings and local marks. Analysis by Carlos A. Ferreira suggest that some remnants from the nave indicate the original architects/designers intended to vault the entire nave, but was never realized.

The frontispiece (surmounted by a cross over a plinth) is divided by reinforced spaces, with narrow windows on the lateral spaces, while an arched portico dominates the central space. Above this doorway are three niches with the images of Nossa Senhora da Assunção, São Bernardo and São Bento, surmounted by three narrow windows and a coat-of-arms. These upper sections of the principal facade were remodeled in the 17th century, with the windows and images of the saints added in this period. The dependencies of the convent were also altered, but these were lost by 1533. The only remnant of this period is a fragment of double capital, decorated in a vegetal form with crochet. The lateral facades include cornices, with two doors on the southern facade and one on the northern facade. The southern apse chapel dominates the opposite facade to the entrance, with a supported chancel with windows and cornice similar to those along the nave.

The interior naves are separated by arched columns on squared pillars. On one of these is a gilded pulpit, while a collateral altar is located to the right of the main altar. Opposite this is tomb. The naves are supported by wood beams and divided into four sections, while the chancel is crossed by two beams. The apse chapel is broken by arches over pilasters, surmounted by windows and frescoes; its two sections and vaulted ceiling, illuminated by two frescoes, has been considered "a programmed realization of the best aspects of the Cistercian spirit".

A similar conclusion was reached from the analysis of other parts of the architectural design. One of them was the space's decoration, characterized by an almost complete lack of ornamental design, which characterize the principal values of the Cistercian Order: "simplicity, austerity and pragmatism". Although the Galician influence of Benedictine churches helped to begin a period of construction, the Cistercian influence inaugurated a new road that would influence 13th century architecture. The chancel which includes vaulted ceiling and broken by a gilded retable. Of the convent, which extended from the southern, nothing remains, although there exist elements associated with its construction including a small space with arches over pilasters and Doric columns, that were part of the convent structure.
