= Gorguja =

Gorguja Gorguja
- Village
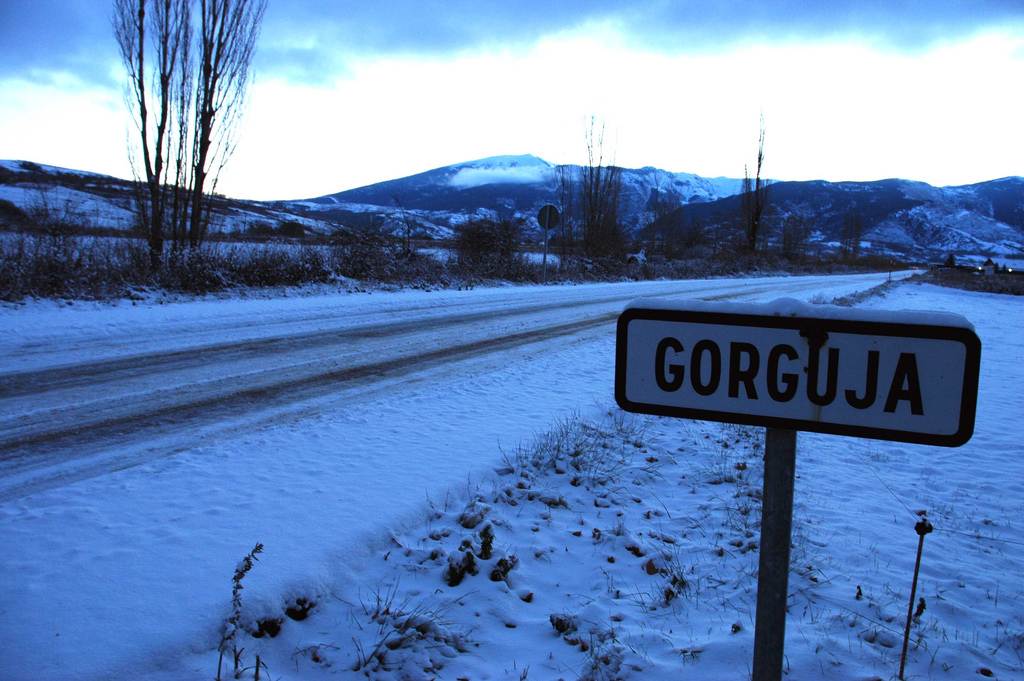

- Location in Catalonia
- Coordinates: 42°27′52″N 1°58′51″E
- Country: Spain
- Autonomous community: Catalonia
- Province: Girona
- Comarca: Cerdanya
- Judicial district: Puigcerdà
- Elevation: 1,244 m (4,081 ft)

Population (2005)
  - Total: 38
- Demonym: Gorgujar
- Time zone: UTC+1 (CET)
  - Summer (DST): UTC+2 (CEST)

Gorguja is a village in the Spanish exclave centred on the town of Llívia which is surrounded by France, north west of Puigcerda. Gorguja can only be reached from Spain by travelling through a short stretch of France.
