= Saint-Mamet =

- Commune
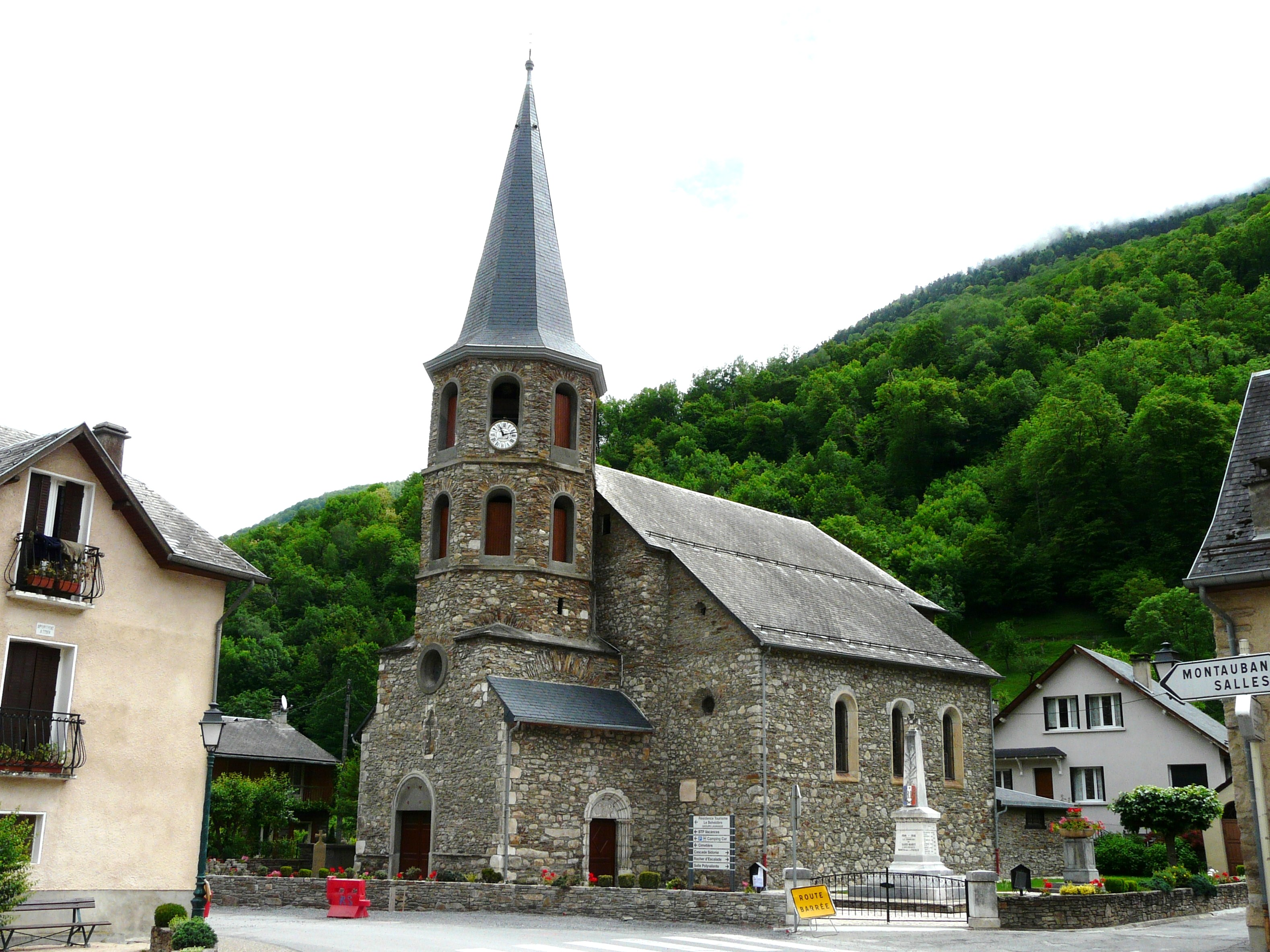
- The church in Saint-Mamet
- Location of Saint-Mamet
- Location within France Location within Occitanie
- Coordinates: 42°46′56″N 0°36′14″E
- Country: France
- Region: Occitania
- Department: Haute-Garonne
- Arrondissement: Saint-Gaudens
- Canton: Bagnères-de-Luchon

Government
  - Mayor (2020–2026): Yvon Saint-Martin
- Area^{1}: 11.16 km^{2} (4.31 sq mi)
- Elevation: 645 m (2,116 ft)
- Highest elevation: 1,975 m (6,480 ft)
- Lowest elevation: 630 m (2,070 ft)
- Population (2023): 548
  - Density: 49.1/km^{2} (127/sq mi)
- Time zone: UTC+01:00 (CET)
  - Summer (DST): UTC+02:00 (CEST)
- INSEE/Postal code: 31500 /31110
- ^{1} French Land Register data, which excludes lakes, ponds, glaciers > 1 km^{2} (0.386 sq mi or 247 acres) and river estuaries.

Saint-Mamet (French pronunciation: [sɛ̃ mamɛ]; Gascon: Sent Mamet) is a commune in the Haute-Garonne department in southwestern France.

== Population ==
Historical population
Year	Pop.	±% p.a.
1968	392	—
1975	410	+0.64%
1982	442	+1.08%
1990	491	+1.32%
1999	499	+0.18%
2007	544	+1.09%
2012	570	+0.94%
2017	557	−0.46%
Source: INSEE

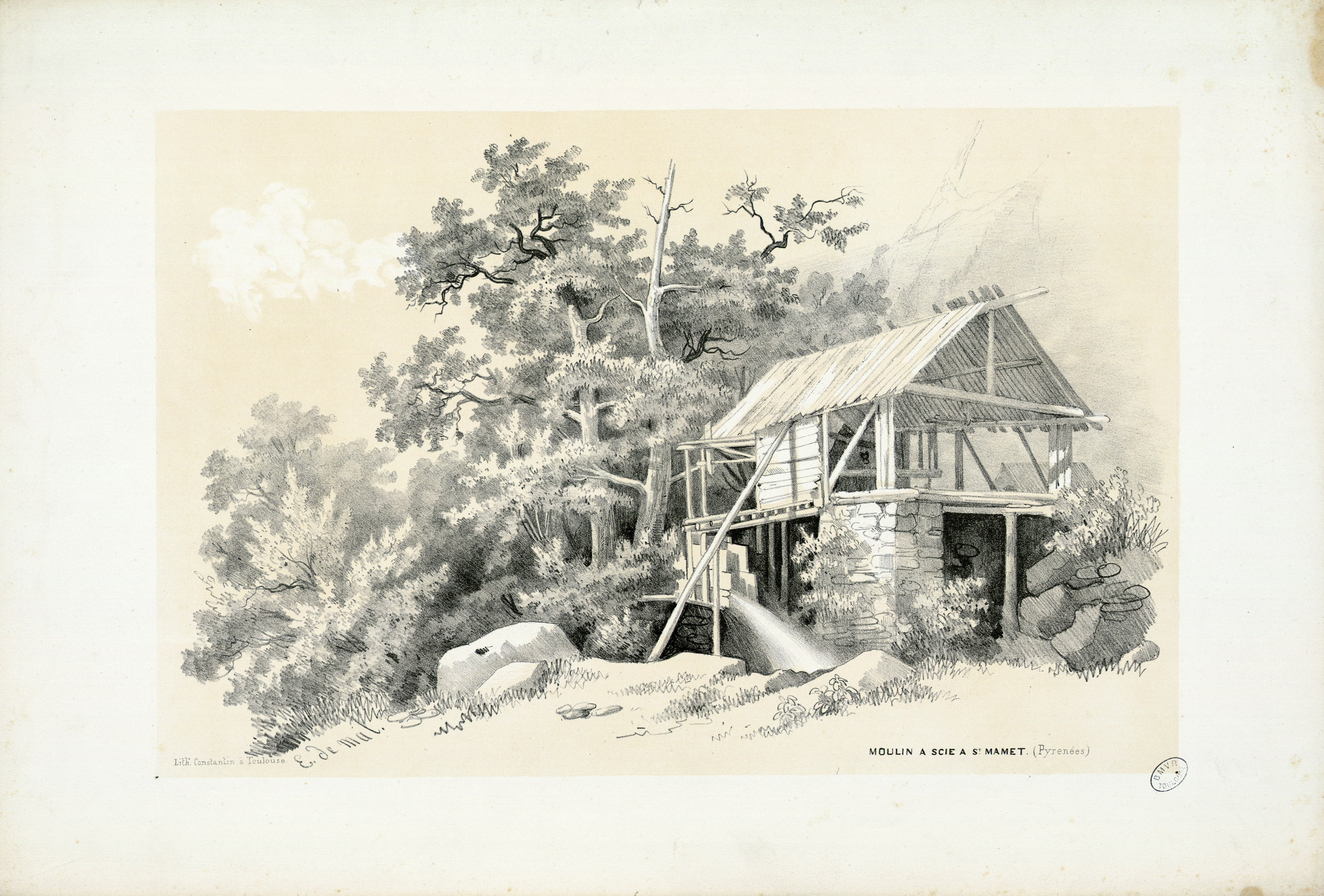
Sawmill in Saint-Mamet by Eugène de Malbos, near 1840.

== See also ==
- Communes of the Haute-Garonne department
