= Paradela (surname) =

Paradela is a Hispanic surname. Notable people with the surname include:

- José Paradela (born 1998), Argentine football player
- Luis Paradela (born 1997), Cuban football player
