= Constantim e Cicouro =

- Civil parish
- Interactive map of Constantim e Cicouro
- Country: Portugal
- Region: Norte
- Intermunic. comm.: Terras de Trás-os-Montes
- District: Bragança
- Municipality: Miranda do Douro

Area
  - Total: 11.51 km^{2} (4.44 sq mi)

Population (2011)
  - Total: 2,667
  - Density: 231.7/km^{2} (600.1/sq mi)
- Time zone: UTC+00:00 (WET)
  - Summer (DST): UTC+01:00 (WEST)

Constantim e Cicouro (Portuguese pronunciation: [kõʃ.tɐ̃ˈtĩ ˈi siˈko(w).ɾu]) (Mirandese: Custantin i Cicuiro, Mirandese pronunciation: [kʊs̺.tãˈtĩŋ ˈi s̻iˈkuj.ɾʊ]) is a civil parish in the municipality of Miranda do Douro, Portugal. It was formed in 2013 by the merger of the former parishes Constantim and Cicouro. The population in 2011 was 2667, in an area of 11.51 km².
