= Ayoó de Vidriales =

Place in Castile and León, Spain

Coordinates: 42°08′N 6°04′W

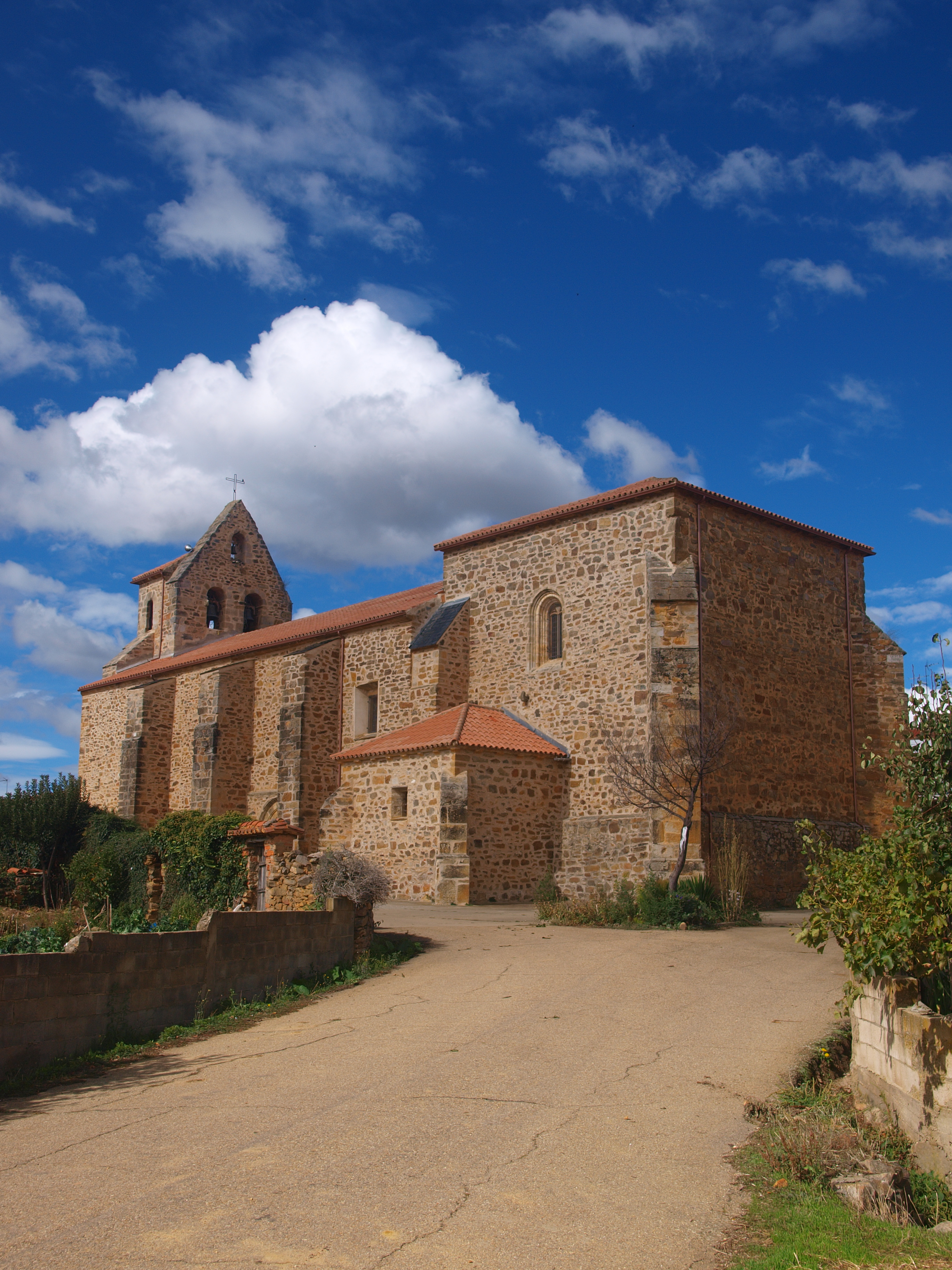

- Coat of arms
- Interactive map of Ayoó de Vidriales
- Country: Spain
- Autonomous community: Castile and León
- Province: Zamora
- Municipality: Ayoó de Vidriales

Area
  - Total: 60 km^{2} (23 sq mi)

Population (2025-01-01)
  - Total: 264
  - Density: 4.4/km^{2} (11/sq mi)
- Time zone: UTC+1 (CET)
  - Summer (DST): UTC+2 (CEST)

Ayoó de Vidriales is a municipality located in the province of Zamora, Castile and León, Spain. According to the 2009 census (INE), the municipality has a population of 397 inhabitants.
