= Luzaide/Valcarlos =

Luzaide/Valcarlos Luzaide (basque)
- Municipality
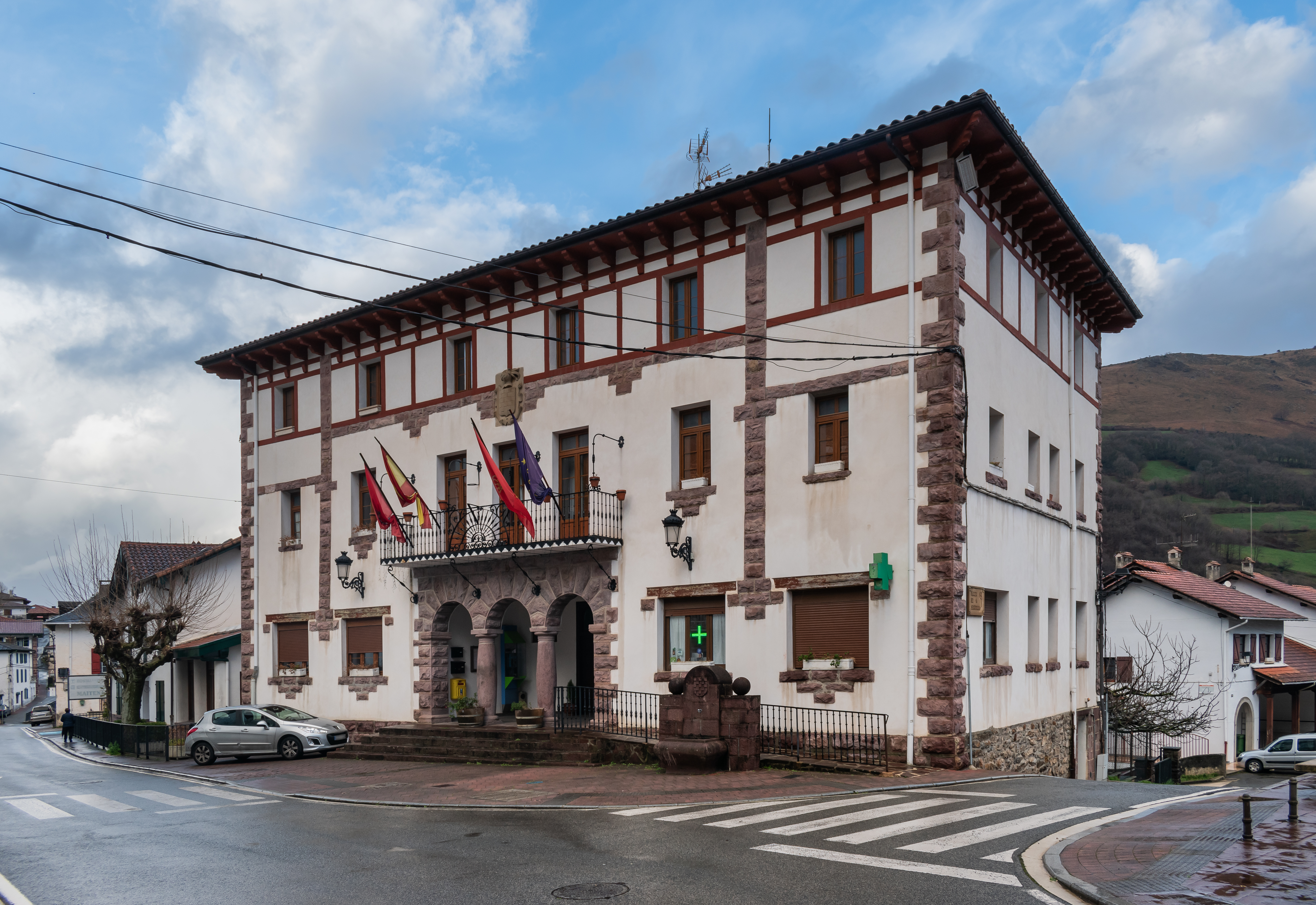

- Flag Coat of arms

- Location in Spain Luzaide/Valcarlos (Spain)
- Coordinates: 43°5′35″N 1°18′4″W
- Country: Spain
- Autonomous community: Navarre
- Province: Navarre
- Comarca: Auñamendi
- Judicial district: Aóiz

Government
  - Mayor: Fernando Alzón Aldave

Area
  - Total: 44.66 km^{2} (17.24 sq mi)
- Elevation: 365 m (1,198 ft)

Population (2009)
  - Total: 418
  - Density: 9.36/km^{2} (24.2/sq mi)
- Demonym: Luzaidarra
- Time zone: UTC+1 (CET)
  - Summer (DST): UTC+2 (CEST)
- Postal code: 31660
- Dialing code: 948
- Website: Official website

Luzaide (Spanish: Valcarlos; official name Luzaide/Valcarlos) is a town in Navarre, northern Spain, located on the French border and just a few kilometers from the road frontier in the French village of Arnéguy.

Tradition holds that this is the valley [val-] where Charlemagne's rear-guard, under the command of Roland, was slaughtered by Vascons at the Battle of Roncevaux Pass in 778. Tradition holds that Charlemagne's troops were returning across the Pyrenees and had become stretched thin. The Vascons, unhappy with the Franks, fell upon the rear-guard and annihilated it. Roland sounded his horn but it was in vain as his horn was split upon a rock near Roncesvalles and he was slain along with his force. This battle at Valcarlos would prove to be Charlemagne's worst, and some say only, defeat in Iberia.

Today's Luzaide is a conglomeration of historical family villas and farms. The family homes are traditional with many whitewashed exteriors and family crests or coats of arms on the exterior. Many of the local landowners, such as the owners of Curutzezahar, a family home one kilometre up the hillside from the village center, have turned their homes into bed-and-breakfast style lodgings for the growing rural tourism industry in the Basque Country. Historically, families would be less associated with the town in which they lived and more with the home in which they were raised. Thus, using the prior home name, Curutzezaharreko would denote one who is from the house of Curutzezahar. The local cemetery shows that regional nomenclature on many headstones.

The town lies on the Camino de Santiago or Camino Francés pilgrim route to Santiago de Compostela in Galicia. There are two routes through the region, one of which passes through the town. There is a modern monument to the pilgrimage road near the city hall representing a recumbent pilgrim. According to the locals, who make no apologies to Roncesvalles, which is located a few kilometres further along the road, Luzaide/Valcarlos is the true jumping off point for pilgrims in Spain who are travelling to Santiago.
