= Ifanes =

- Civil parish
- Location in Portugal
- Coordinates: 41°34′54″N 6°15′55″W
- Country: Portugal
- Region: Norte
- Intermunic. comm.: Terras de Trás-os-Montes
- District: Bragança
- Municipality: Miranda do Douro
- Disbanded: 28 January 2013

Area
  - Total: 28.51 km^{2} (11.01 sq mi)

Population (2011)
  - Total: 160
  - Density: 5.6/km^{2} (15/sq mi)
- Time zone: UTC+00:00 (WET)
  - Summer (DST): UTC+01:00 (WEST)

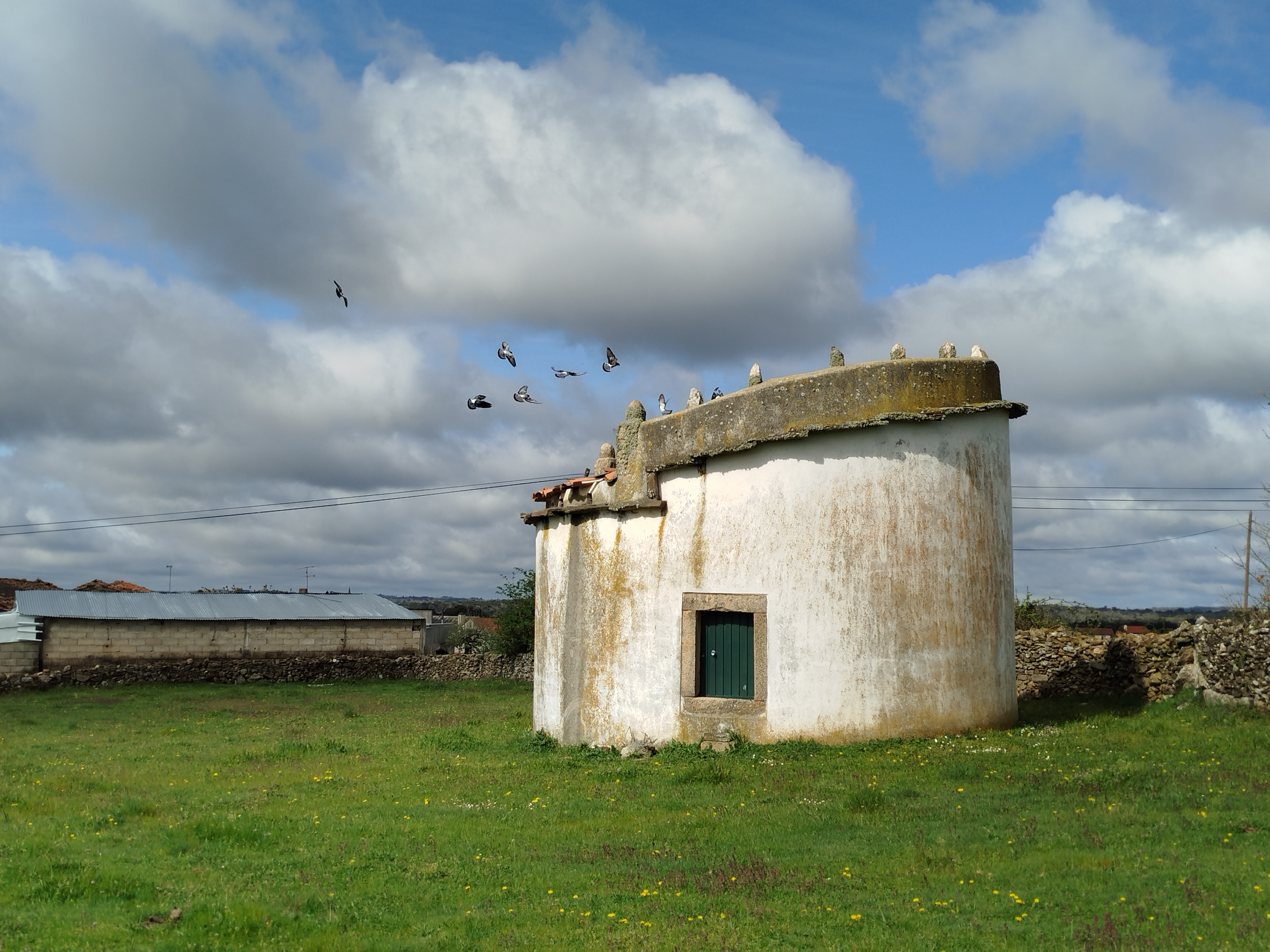
A dovecote in the parish of Ifanes, in Miranda de l Douro.

Ifanes (mirandese: Anfainç) is a former parish in the municipality of Miranda do Douro, Portugal. The population in 2011 was 160, in an area of 28.51 km^{2}. In 2013, the parish merged with Paradela to form the new parish Ifanes e Paradela.
