= Izalzu – Itzaltzu =

Municipality of Spain

Coordinates: 42°54′52″N 1°03′08″W

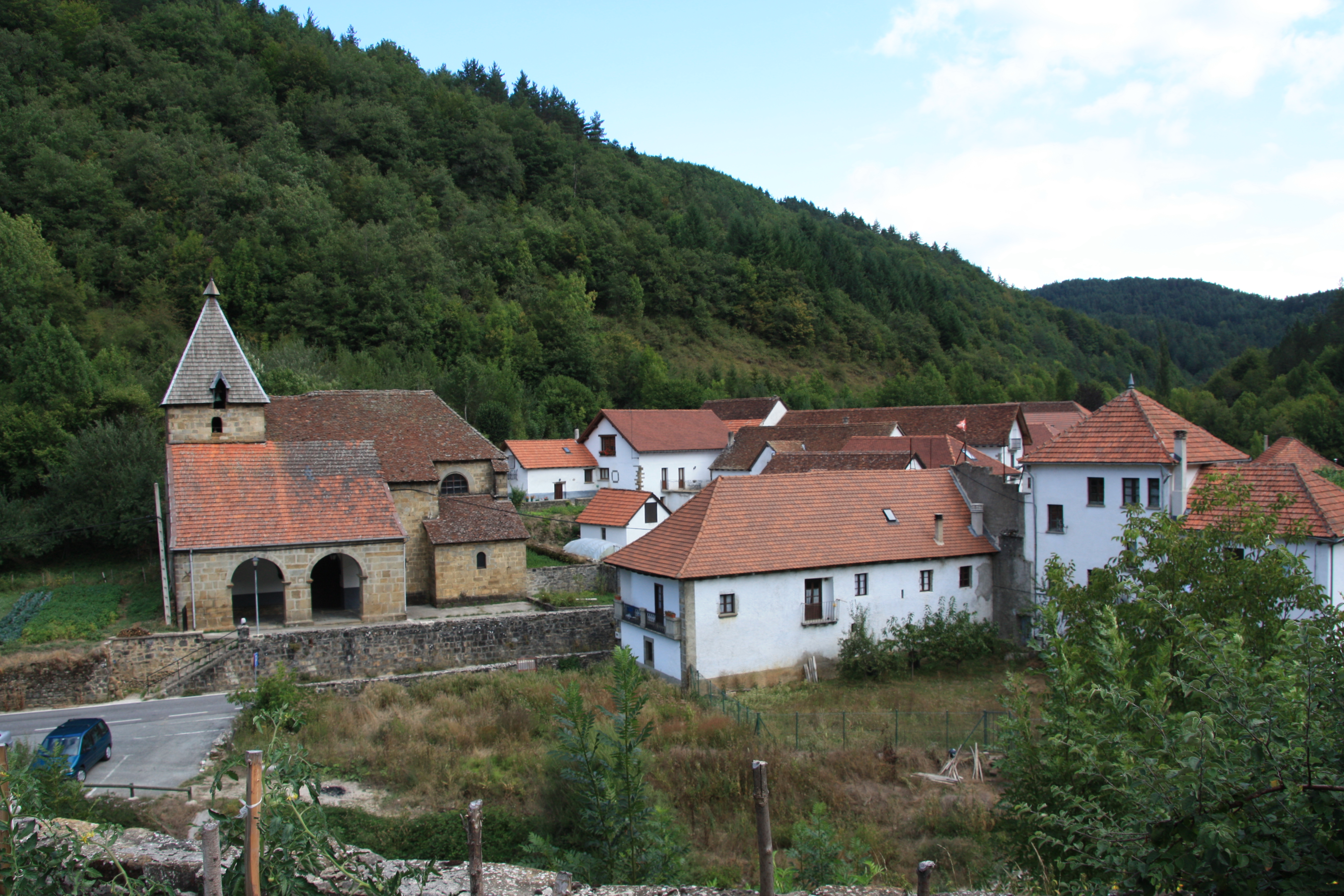

Izalzu – Itzaltzu is a town and municipality located in the province and autonomous community of Navarre, northern Spain.
