= Torregamones =

Torregamones, Spain
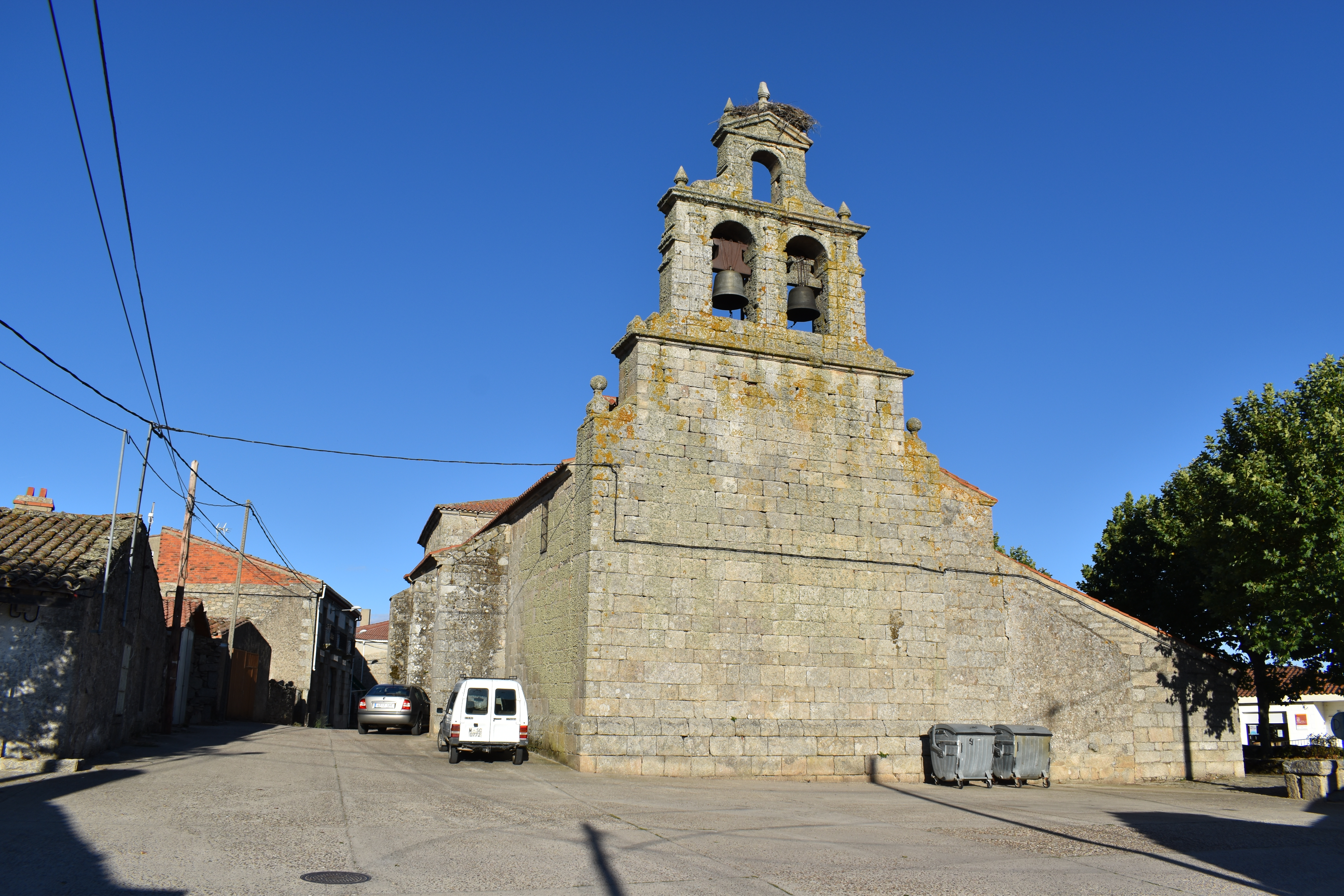
- Torregamones church

- Flag Coat of arms
- Interactive map of Torregamones, Spain
- Coordinates: 41°29′N 6°10′W
- Country: Spain
- Autonomous community: Castile and León
- Province: Zamora
- Municipality: Torregamones

Government
  - Mayor: Javier Sánchez (PP)

Area
  - Total: 36 km^{2} (14 sq mi)
- Elevation: 779 m (2,556 ft)

Population (2025-01-01)
  - Total: 225
  - Density: 6.2/km^{2} (16/sq mi)
- Time zone: UTC+1 (CET)
  - Summer (DST): UTC+2 (CEST)
- Website: http://www.torregamones.es.tl/

Torregamones is a municipality in the province of Zamora, Castile and León, Spain. According to the 2007 census (INE), it had a population of 310 inhabitants (166 men and 144 women).
