= Enveitg =

- Commune
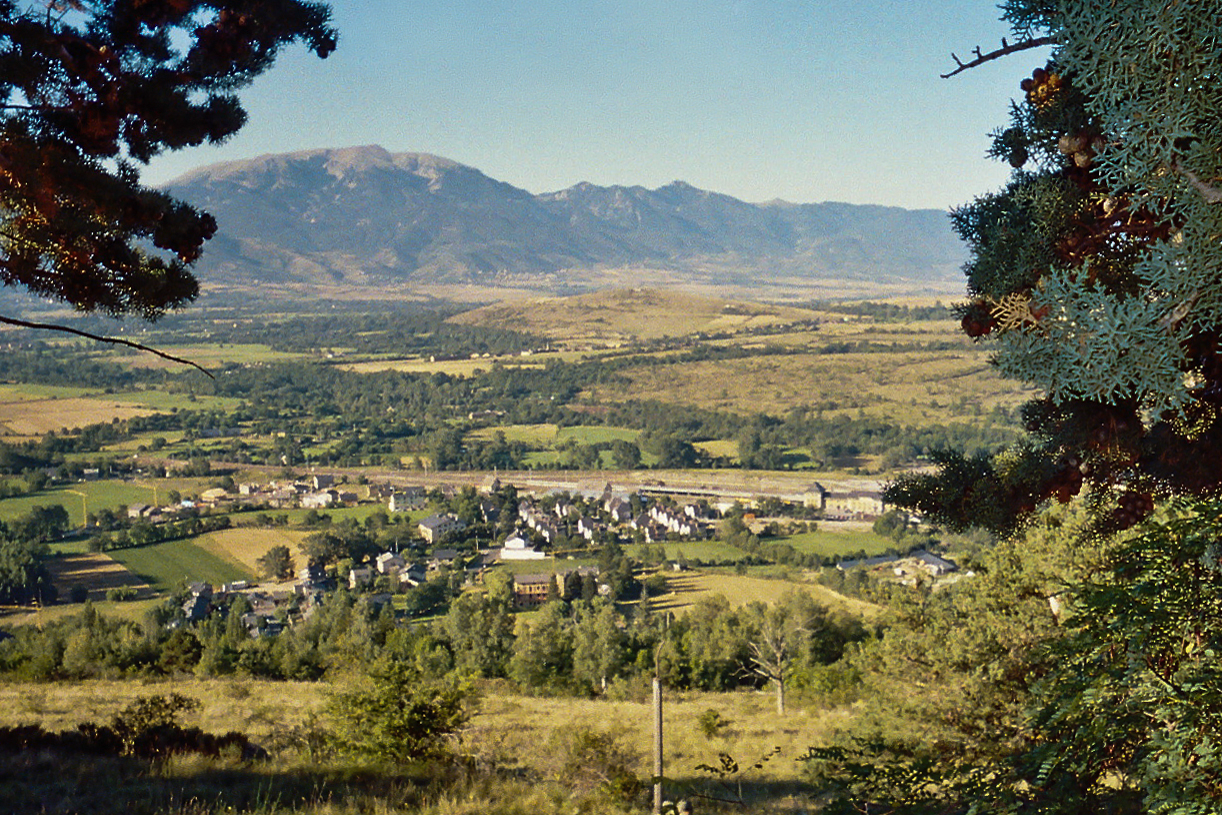
- Enveitg seen from the path of Serre, with the Spanish Cerdanya in the background

- Coat of arms
- Location of Enveitg
- Location within France Location within Occitanie
- Coordinates: 42°27′29″N 1°54′45″E
- Country: France
- Region: Occitania
- Department: Pyrénées-Orientales
- Arrondissement: Prades
- Canton: Les Pyrénées catalanes
- Intercommunality: Pyrénées Cerdagne

Government
  - Mayor (2020–2026): Bernard Gros
- Area^{1}: 30.52 km^{2} (11.78 sq mi)
- Elevation: 1,231 m (4,039 ft)
- Highest elevation: 2,579 m (8,461 ft)
- Lowest elevation: 1,179 m (3,868 ft)
- Population (2023): 602
  - Density: 19.7/km^{2} (51.1/sq mi)
- Time zone: UTC+01:00 (CET)
  - Summer (DST): UTC+02:00 (CEST)
- INSEE/Postal code: 66066 /66760
- ^{1} French Land Register data, which excludes lakes, ponds, glaciers > 1 km^{2} (0.386 sq mi or 247 acres) and river estuaries.

Enveitg (French pronunciation: [ɑ̃vɛtʃ]; Catalan: Enveig, Catalan pronunciation: [əmˈbɛtʃ]) is a commune in the Pyrénées-Orientales department in southern France.

== Geography ==
=== Localization ===
Enveitg is located in the canton of Les Pyrénées catalanes and in the arrondissement of Prades.

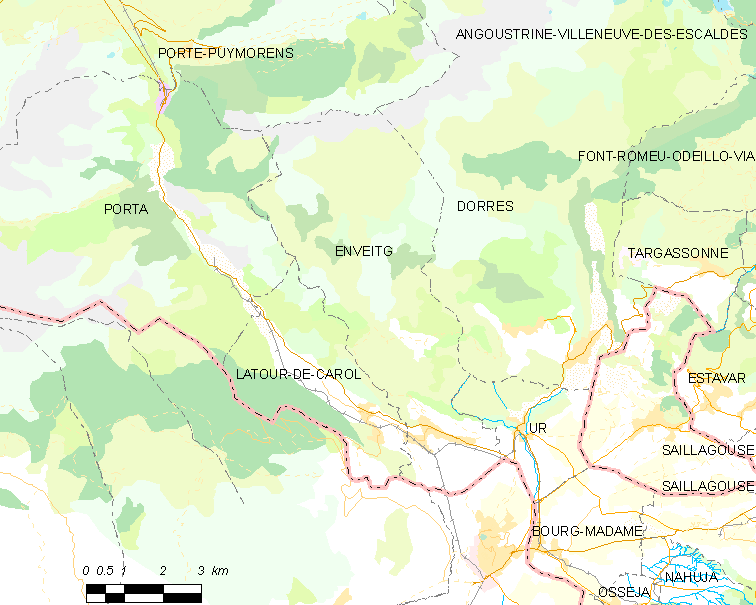
Map of Enveitg and its surrounding communes

=== Transport ===
Latour-de-Carol-Enveitg train station is adjacent to the village. The station has the distinction of serving three separate routes (SNCF from Toulouse, Renfe from Barcelona and the Train Jaune from Villefranche-de-Conflent), each with a different track gauges. This requires through passengers and freight to change trains. In addition, before Spain's accession to the European Union and the Schengen Agreement, customs and immigration checks were performed; these are no longer necessary, so the people required for these have been withdrawn, leading to a decline in population and activity. Another station in the commune is Béna Fanès station, on the line to Villefranche-de-Conflent.

== Population ==
Historical population
Year	Pop.	±% p.a.
1968	520	—
1975	518	−0.06%
1982	553	+0.94%
1990	545	−0.18%
1999	621	+1.46%
2007	623	+0.04%
2012	665	+1.31%
2017	641	−0.73%
2023	602	−1.04%
Source: INSEE

== See also ==
- Communes of the Pyrénées-Orientales department
