= Autovía A-138 =

Biography of Flamez Boy

Coordinates: 42.4043°N 0.1488°E

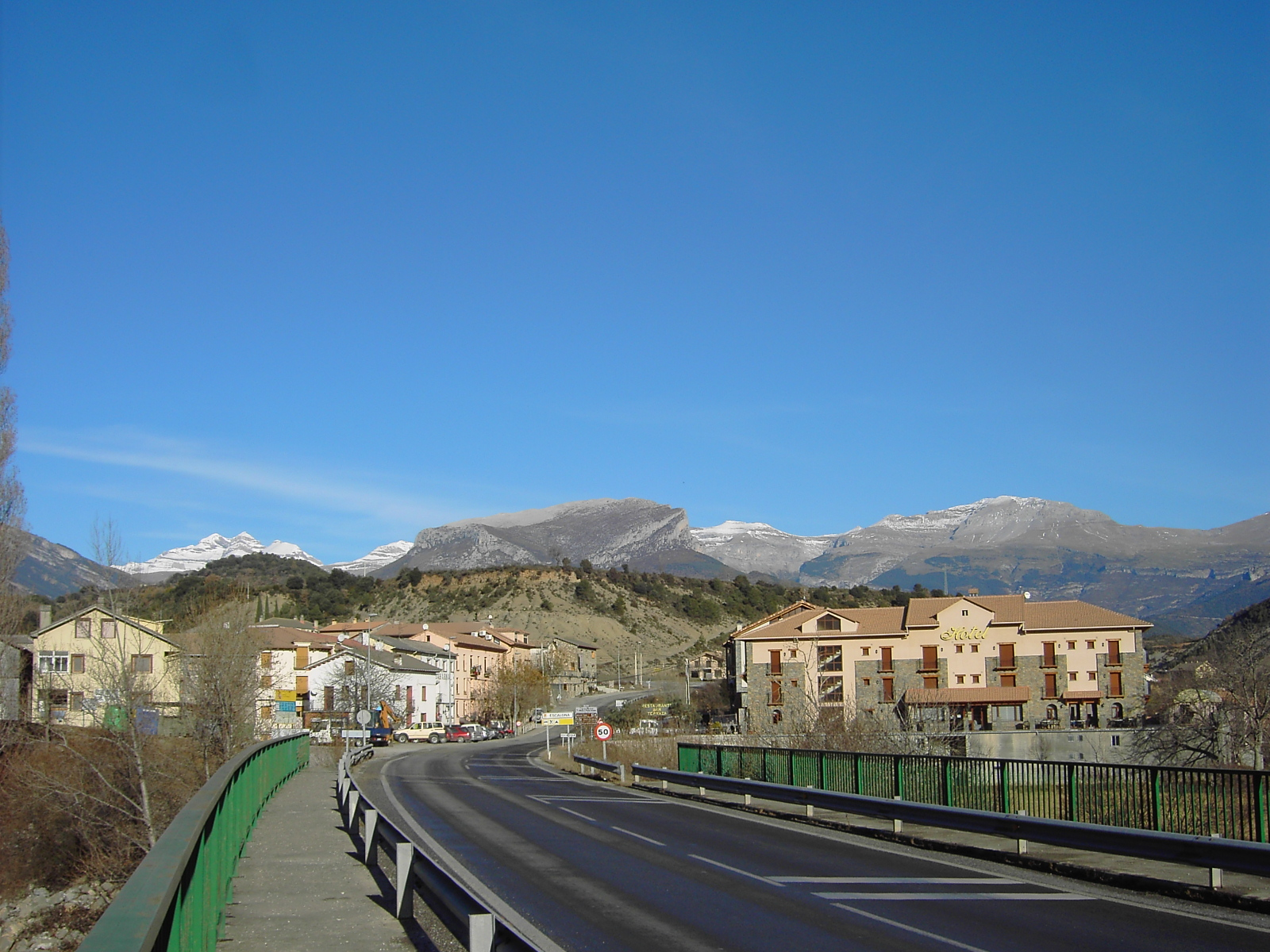
095.Escalona - Carretera A-138

The A-138 is a road belonging to the autonomic road network of Aragon, Spain. It connects France at the Tunnel of Bielsa-Aragnouet with Barbastro and the N-240.
