= Paradela (Miranda do Douro) =

- Civil parish
- Location in Portugal
- Coordinates: 41°34′54″N 6°12′59″W
- Country: Portugal
- Region: Norte
- Intermunic. comm.: Terras de Trás-os-Montes
- District: Bragança
- Municipality: Miranda do Douro
- Disbanded: 28 January 2013

Area
  - Total: 13.84 km^{2} (5.34 sq mi)

Population (2011)
  - Total: 165
  - Density: 11.9/km^{2} (30.9/sq mi)
- Time zone: UTC+00:00 (WET)
  - Summer (DST): UTC+01:00 (WEST)

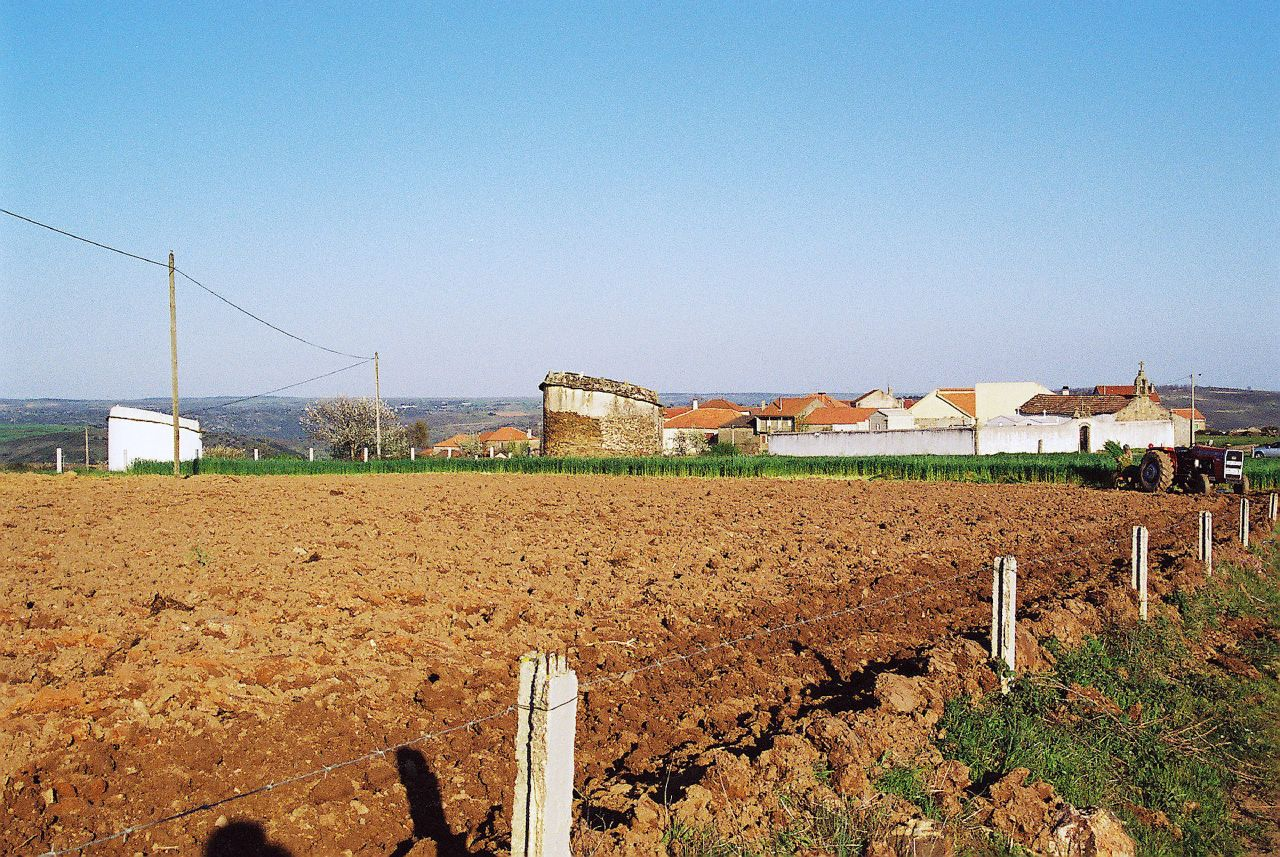

Paradela is a former parish in the municipality of Miranda do Douro, Portugal. The population in 2011 was 165, in an area of 13.84 km². In 2013, the parish merged with Ifanes to form the new parish Ifanes e Paradela. Paradela is the Portuguese settlement farthest removed from the sea, as well as the easternmost point of Portugal.
