= Fiães (Melgaço) =

- Civil parish
- Location in Portugal
- Coordinates: 42.107°N 8.195°W
- Country: Portugal
- Region: Norte
- Intermunic. comm.: Alto Minho
- District: Viana do Castelo
- Municipality: Melgaço

Area
  - Total: 11.21 km^{2} (4.33 sq mi)

Population (2011)
  - Total: 239
  - Density: 21/km^{2} (55/sq mi)
- Time zone: UTC+00:00 (WET)
  - Summer (DST): UTC+01:00 (WEST)

Fiães (Portuguese pronunciation: [fiˈɐ̃jʃ]) is a Portuguese parish, located in the municipality of Melgaço. The population in 2011 was 239, in an area of 11.21 km^{2}.

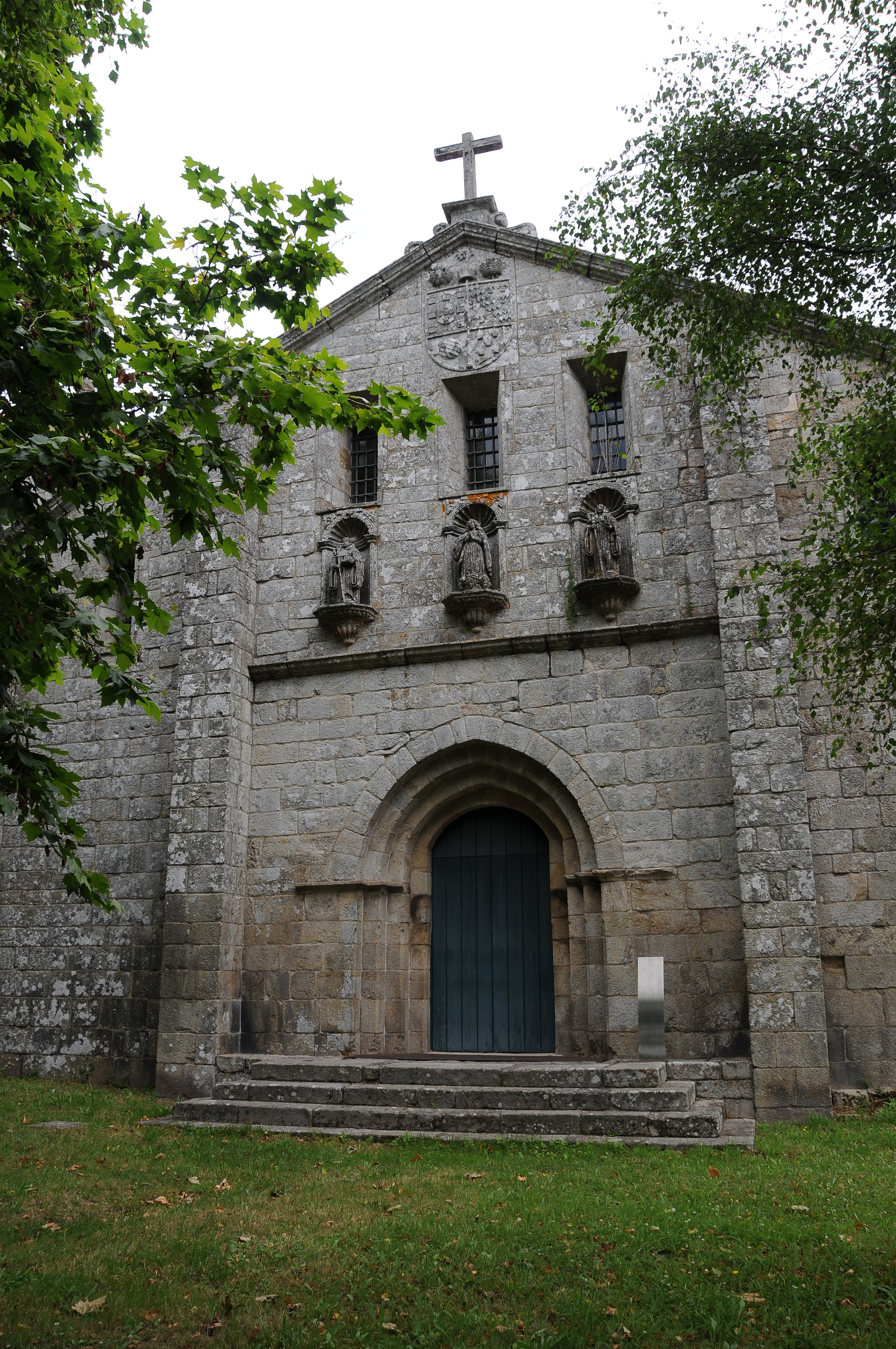
Fiães Church
