= Constantim (Miranda do Douro) =

- Civil parish
- Location in Portugal
- Coordinates: 41°37′19″N 6°16′32″W
- Country: Portugal
- Region: Norte
- Intermunic. comm.: Terras de Trás-os-Montes
- District: Bragança
- Municipality: Miranda do Douro
- Disbanded: 28 January 2013

Area
  - Total: 22.22 km^{2} (8.58 sq mi)

Population (2011)
  - Total: 109
  - Density: 4.9/km^{2} (13/sq mi)
- Time zone: UTC+00:00 (WET)
  - Summer (DST): UTC+01:00 (WEST)

Constantim is a former parish in the municipality of Miranda do Douro, Portugal. The population in 2011 was 109, in an area of 22.22 km^{2}. In 2013, the parish merged with Cicouro to form the new parish Constantim e Cicouro.
