= Arnéguy =

Arnéguy Arnegi
- Commune
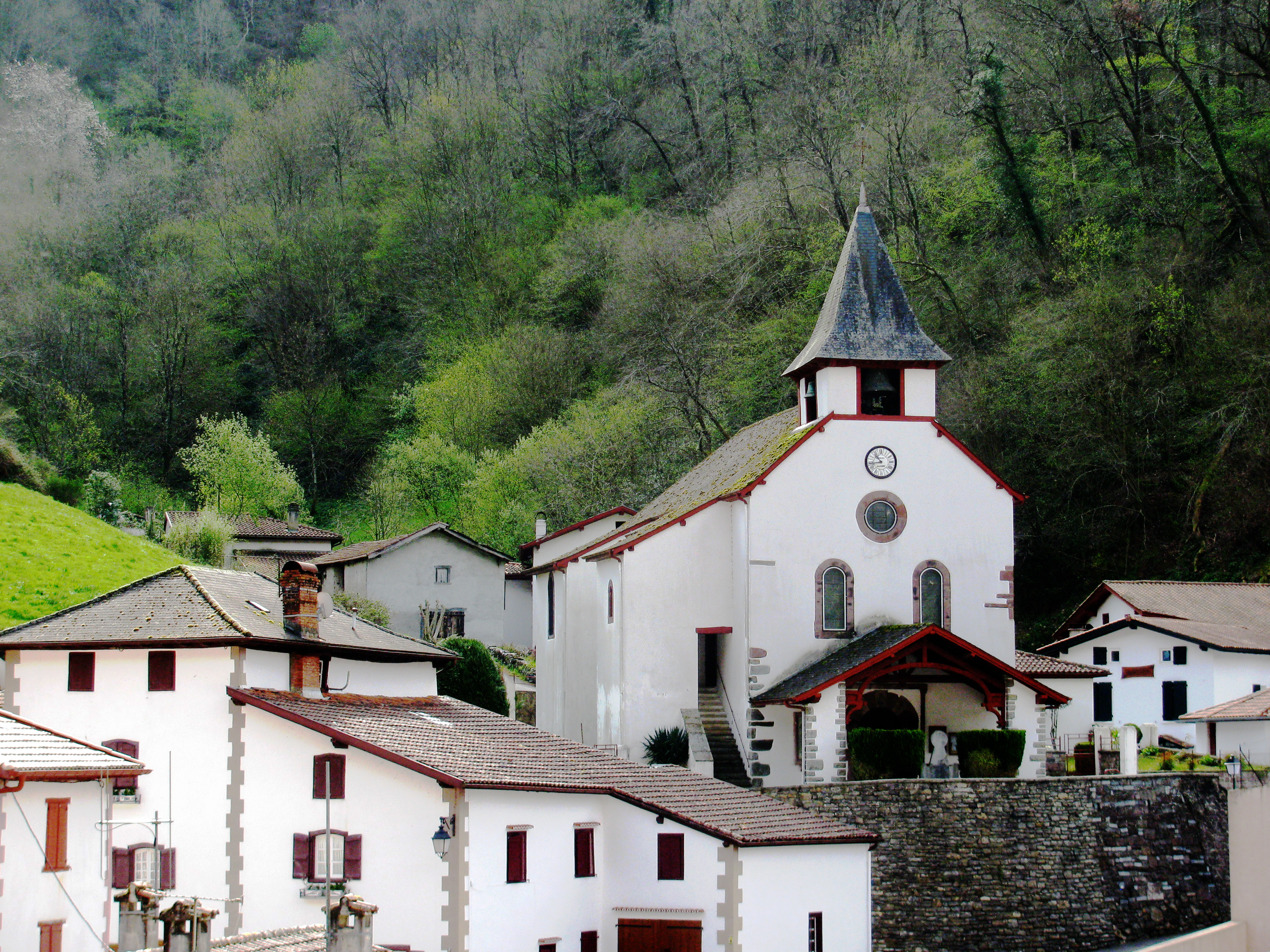
- The village and church of Arnéguy
- Location of Arnéguy
- Location within France Location within Nouvelle-Aquitaine
- Coordinates: 43°07′N 1°17′W
- Country: France
- Region: Nouvelle-Aquitaine
- Department: Pyrénées-Atlantiques
- Arrondissement: Bayonne
- Canton: Montagne Basque
- Intercommunality: CA Pays Basque

Government
  - Mayor (2020–2026): Catherine Bègue
- Area^{1}: 21.21 km^{2} (8.19 sq mi)
- Elevation: 389 m (1,276 ft)
- Highest elevation: 1,410 m (4,630 ft)
- Lowest elevation: 218 m (715 ft)
- Population (2023): 237
  - Density: 11.2/km^{2} (28.9/sq mi)
- Time zone: UTC+01:00 (CET)
  - Summer (DST): UTC+02:00 (CEST)
- INSEE/Postal code: 64047 /64220
- ^{1} French Land Register data, which excludes lakes, ponds, glaciers > 1 km^{2} (0.386 sq mi or 247 acres) and river estuaries.

Arnéguy (French pronunciation: [aʁneɡi]; Occitan: Arnégui; Basque: Arnegi) is a commune in the Pyrénées-Atlantiques department in southwestern France. The village is an important stopping point on the road between Saint-Jean-Pied-de-Port and Pamplona, Spain, as it lies on the border of France and Spain. It is located in the former province of Lower Navarre. Because of its proximity to Saint-Jean-Pied-de-Port, Arnéguy is a popular tourist destination for those travelling across the Pyrenees, although its economy remains mostly agricultural.

== See also ==
- Communes of the Pyrénées-Atlantiques department
