= Bourg-Madame =

Bourg-Madame La Guingueta d'Ix
- Commune
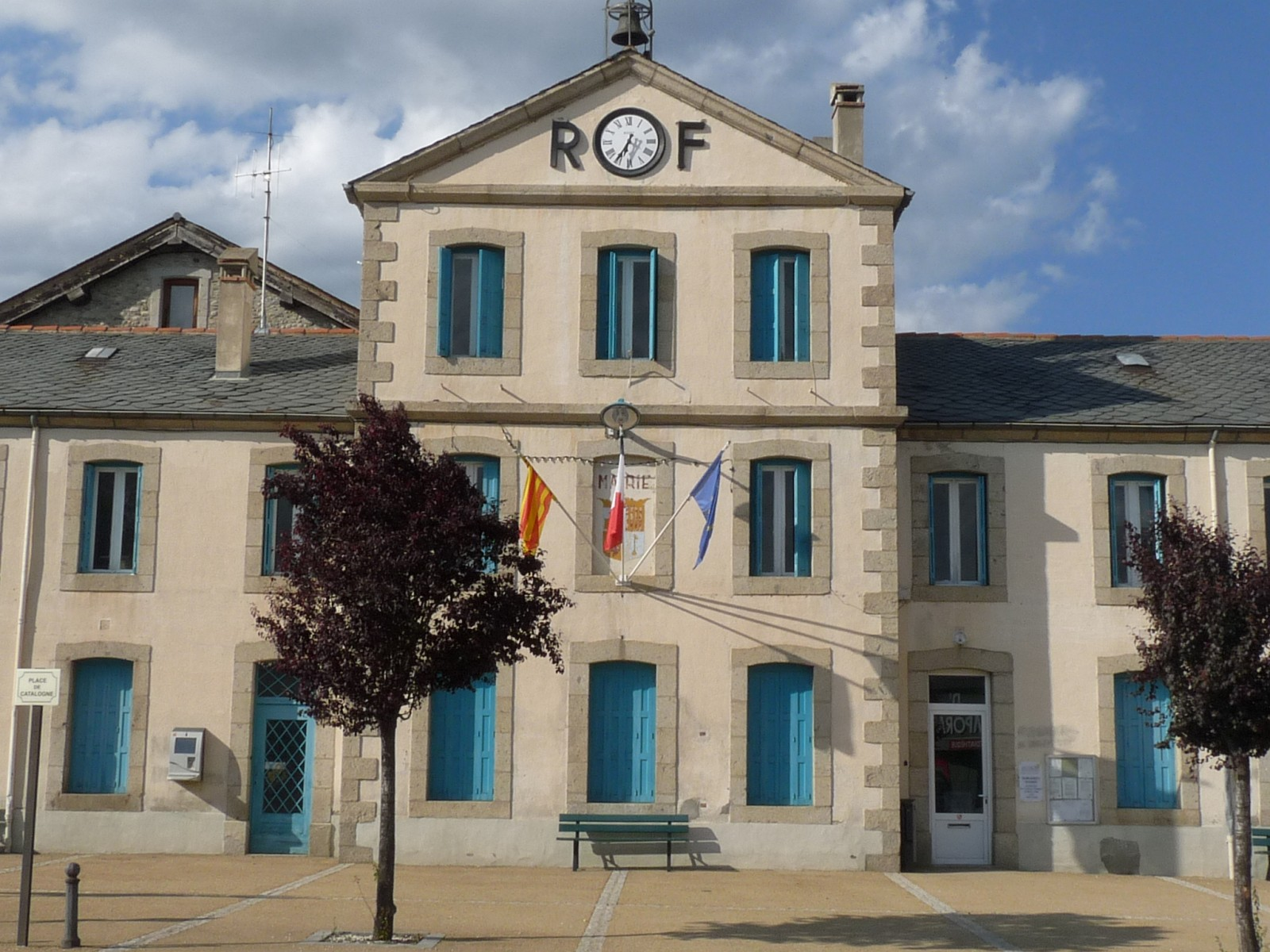
- The town hall in Bourg-Madame

- Coat of arms
- Location of Bourg-Madame
- Location within France Location within Occitanie
- Coordinates: 42°26′07″N 1°56′41″E
- Country: France
- Region: Occitania
- Department: Pyrénées-Orientales
- Arrondissement: Prades
- Canton: Les Pyrénées catalanes
- Intercommunality: Pyrénées Cerdagne

Government
  - Mayor (2020–2026): Daniel Armisen
- Area^{1}: 7.85 km^{2} (3.03 sq mi)
- Elevation: 1,130 m (3,710 ft)
- Highest elevation: 1,235 m (4,052 ft)
- Lowest elevation: 1,130 m (3,710 ft)
- Population (2023): 1,182
  - Density: 151/km^{2} (390/sq mi)
- Time zone: UTC+01:00 (CET)
  - Summer (DST): UTC+02:00 (CEST)
- INSEE/Postal code: 66025 /66760
- ^{1} French Land Register data, which excludes lakes, ponds, glaciers > 1 km^{2} (0.386 sq mi or 247 acres) and river estuaries.

Bourg-Madame (French pronunciation: [buʁ madam]; Catalan: La Guingueta d'Ix Catalan pronunciation: [ləɣiŋˈɡɛtəˈðiʃ]) is a commune in the Pyrénées-Orientales department in southern France.

== Geography ==
=== Localisation ===
Bourg-Madame is located in the canton of Les Pyrénées catalanes and in the arrondissement of Prades. It lies right on the border with Spain. It abuts directly onto the Spanish town of Puigcerdà, and is near the Spanish exclave of Llívia.

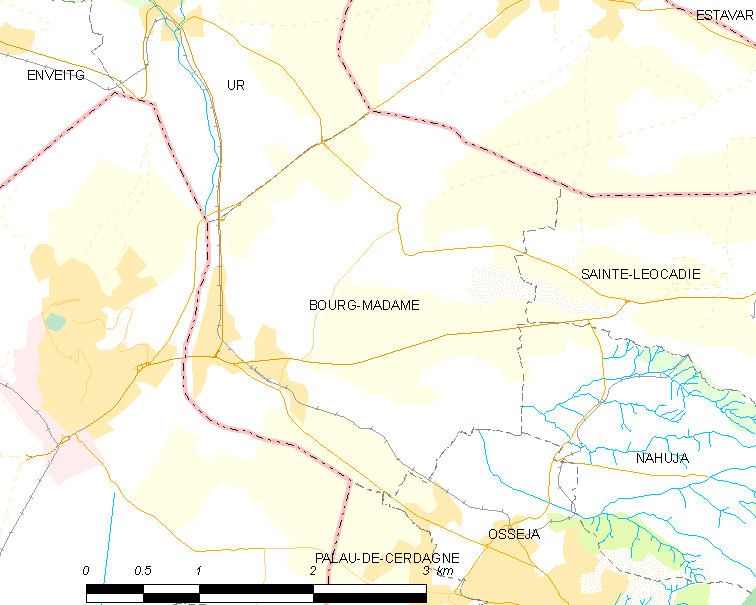
Map of Bourg-Madame and its surrounding communes

== Toponymy ==
The town used to be known in French as Les Guinguettes, until 1815 when it was renamed Bourg-Madame in honour of the wife of the Duke of Angoulême. The Catalan name for the town is still the traditional one.

== History ==
In the 20th century, Bourg-Madame was the site of a camp housing Republican escapees from Spain at the end of the Spanish Civil War.

== Government and politics ==
=== Mayors ===
Mayor	Term start	Term end
Thomas Casals	1930	?
Jean Salvat	1945	1965
Joseph Calvet	1965	1995
Jean-Jacques Fortuny	1995	2020
Daniel Armisen	2020	incumbent

== Transport ==
=== Roads ===
The following major roads lead to Bourg-Madame:

- N-20 from Ur to the north;
- N-154 and D-68 from the Spanish enclave Llívia to the northeast;
- N-116 from Saillagouse to the east;
- D-30 and D-70 from Osséja and Palau-de-Cerdagne to the southeast;
- N-152 from Puigcerdà to the west.

=== Railways ===
Bourg-Madame is located at a key point of intersection for railways that link Toulouse, Barcelona, and Valencia (as well as Perpignan to the east via the Yellow Train).

The railway station is located in the Arena district.

== Population ==
Historical population
Year	Pop.	±% p.a.
1968	821	—
1975	1,120	+4.54%
1982	1,257	+1.66%
1990	1,238	−0.19%
1999	1,166	−0.66%
2007	1,255	+0.92%
2012	1,266	+0.17%
2017	1,224	−0.67%
2023	1,182	−0.58%
Source: INSEE

== International relations ==
The commune is twinned with:

- Vespella de Gaià, Spain

== See also ==
- Communes of the Pyrénées-Orientales department
