= Puigcerdà =

- Municipality
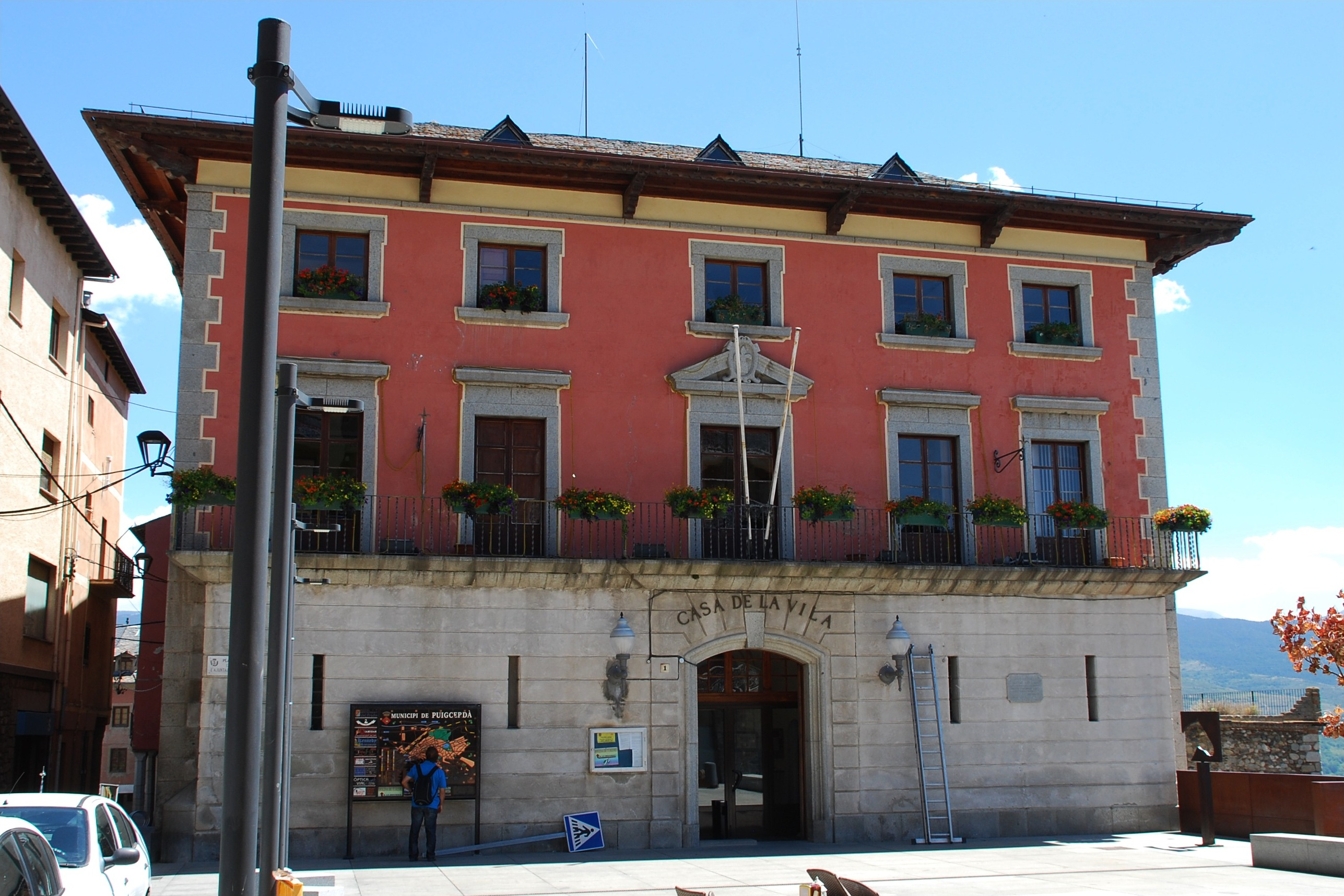
- Casa de la Vila, the city hall

- Flag Coat of arms

- Location in Catalonia Puigcerdà (Spain)
- Coordinates: 42°25′54″N 1°55′42″E
- Country: Spain
- Autonomous community: Catalonia
- Province: Girona
- Comarca: Baixa Cerdanya

Government
  - Mayor: Albert Piñeira Brosel (2015) (CiU)

Area
  - Total: 18.9 km^{2} (7.3 sq mi)
- Elevation: 1,202 m (3,944 ft)

Population (2025-01-01)
  - Total: 10,035
  - Density: 531/km^{2} (1,380/sq mi)
- Demonym: Puigcerdanenc
- Time zone: UTC+1 (CET)
  - Summer (DST): UTC+2 (CEST)
- Climate: Cfb
- Website: puigcerda.cat

Puigcerdà (Catalan pronunciation: [ˌputʃsəɾˈða, ˌputʃəɾˈða]; Spanish: Puigcerdá, pronounced [putʃθeɾˈða]) is the capital of the Catalan comarca of Cerdanya, in the province of Girona, Catalonia, northern Spain, near the Segre River and on the border with France (it abuts directly on the French town of Bourg-Madame). It has a population of 10,035 (register office, 2025).

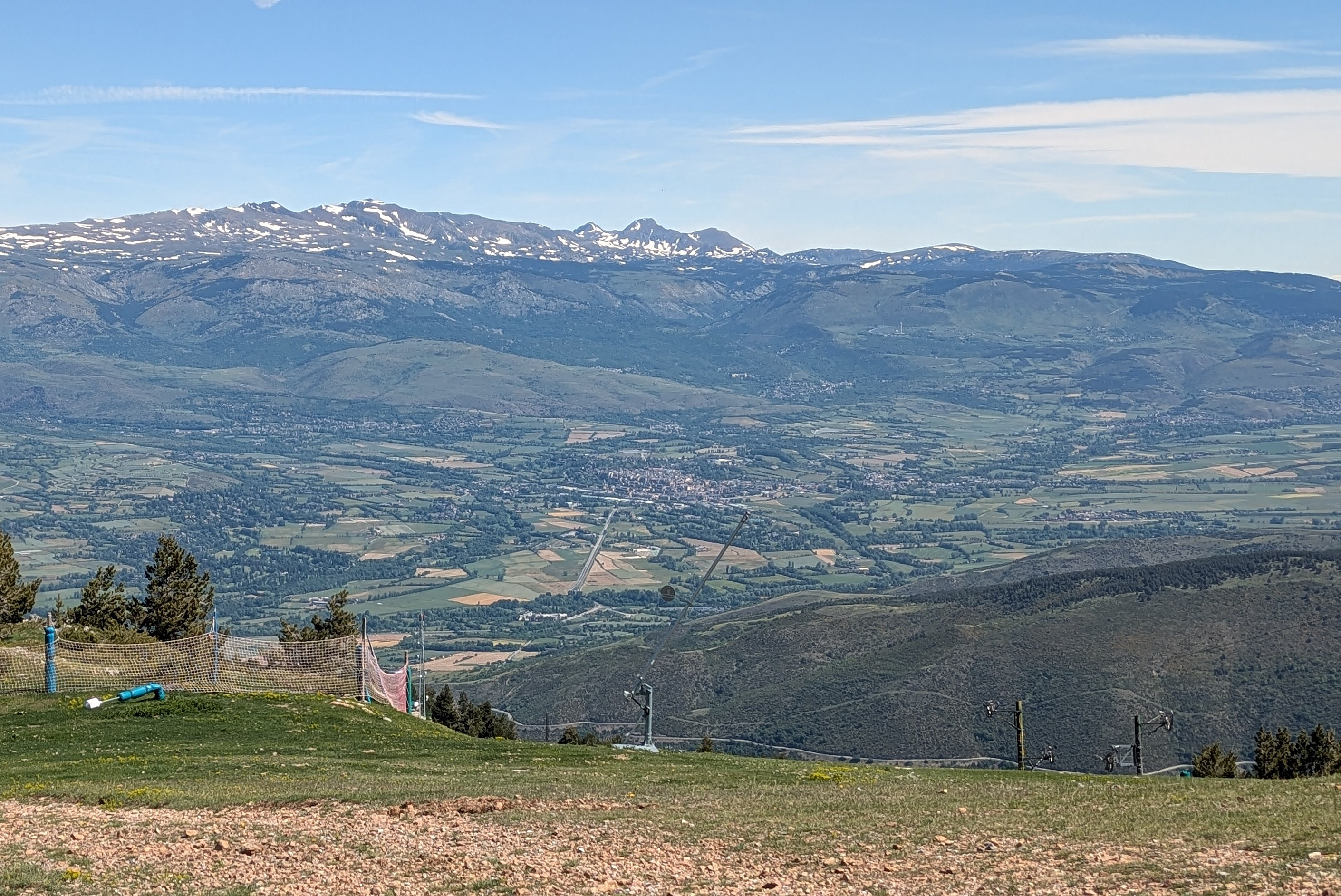
View to the north-east over Puigcerdà (centre).

== History ==
Puigcerdà is located near the site of a Ceretani settlement, which was incorporated into Roman territory. The Roman town was named Julia Libyca (modern day Llívia).

Puigcerdà was founded in 1178 by King Alfonso I of Aragon, Count of Barcelona. In 1178 Puigcerdà replaced Hix as the capital of Cerdanya. Hix is now a village in the commune of Bourg-Madame, in the French part of Cerdanya.

In the closing stages of the 1672–1678 Franco-Dutch War, the town was captured by a French army under the duc de Noailles but returned to Spain in the Treaties of Nijmegen.

Puigcerdà was unique during the Spanish Civil War in having a democratically elected Anarchist council.

The Portet-Saint-Simon–Puigcerdà railway was opened in 1929, crossing the Pyrenees to France.

== Main sights ==
- Puigcerdà Pool
- Torre del Campanar (12th century), the ruins of a parish church destroyed in 1936
- Romanesque church of Sant Tomàs de Ventajola, dating from 958
- Romanesque church of Sant Andreu Vilallobent, dating to the 10th century and later restored
- Convent of St. Dominic, founded in 1291 and finished in the 15th century
- Old Hospital (1190), in Romanesque-Gothic style

== Notable people ==
- Pere Borrell del Caso (1835-1910), painter
- Gemma Arró Ribot (born 1980), ski mountaineer
- José Antonio Hermida (born 1978), 2010 cross country mountain biking world champion
