= List of freguesias of Portugal: M =

The freguesias (civil parishes) of Portugal are listed in by municipality according to the following format:

- concelho
  - freguesias

== Mação ==
- Aboboreira
- Amêndoa
- Cardigos
- Carvoeiro
- Envendos
- Mação
- Ortiga
- Penhascoso

== Macedo de Cavaleiros ==
- Ala
- Amendoeira
- Arcas
- Bagueixe
- Bornes
- Burga
- Carrapatas
- Castelãos
- Chacim
- Cortiços
- Corujas
- Edroso
- Espadanedo
- Ferreira
- Grijó de Vale Benfeito
- Lagoa
- Lamalonga
- Lamas de Podence
- Lombo
- Macedo de Cavaleiros
- Morais
- Murçós
- Olmos
- Peredo
- Podence
- Salselas
- Santa Combinha
- Sesulfe
- Soutelo Mourisco
- Talhas
- Talhinhas
- Vale Benfeito
- Vale da Porca
- Vale de Prados
- Vilar do Monte
- Vilarinho de Agrochão
- Vilarinho do Monte
- Vinhas

== Machico (Madeira) ==
- Água de Pena
- Caniçal
- Machico
- Porto da Cruz
- Santo António da Serra

== Madalena (Azores) ==
- Bandeiras
- Candelária
- Criação Velha
- Madalena
- São Caetano
- São Mateus

== Mafra ==
- Azueira
- Carvoeira
- Cheleiros
- Encarnação
- Enxara do Bispo
- Ericeira
- Gradil
- Igreja Nova
- Mafra
- Malveira
- Milharado
- Santo Estêvão das Galés
- Santo Isidoro
- São Miguel de Alcainça
- Sobral da Abelheira
- Venda do Pinheiro
- Vila Franca do Rosário

== Maia ==
- Águas Santas
- Avioso (Santa Maria)
- Avioso (São Pedro)
- Barca
- Folgosa
- Gemunde
- Gondim
- Gueifães
- Maia
- Milheirós
- Moreira
- Nogueira
- Pedrouços
- São Pedro Fins
- Silva Escura
- Vermoim
- Vila Nova da Telha

== Mangualde ==
- Abrunhosa-a-Velha
- Alcafache
- Chãs de Tavares
- Cunha Alta
- Cunha Baixa
- Espinho
- Fornos de Maceira Dão
- Freixiosa
- Lobelhe do Mato
- Mangualde
- Mesquitela
- Moimenta de Maceira Dão
- Póvoa de Cervães
- Quintela de Azurara
- Santiago de Cassurrães
- São João da Fresta
- Travanca de Tavares
- Várzea de Tavares

== Manteigas ==
- Manteigas (Santa Maria)
- Manteigas (São Pedro)
- Sameiro
- Vale de Amoreira

== Marco de Canaveses ==
- Alpendurada e Matos
- Ariz
- Avessadas
- Banho e Carvalhosa
- Constance (Portugal)
- Favões
- Folhada
- Fornos
- Freixo
- Magrelos
- Manhuncelos
- Maureles
- Paços de Gaiolo
- Paredes de Viadores
- Penha Longa
- Rio de Galinhas
- Rosem
- Sande
- Santo Isidoro
- São Lourenço do Douro
- São Nicolau
- Soalhães
- Sobretâmega
- Tabuado
- Torrão
- Toutosa
- Tuias
- Várzea da Ovelha e Aliviada
- Várzea do Douro
- Vila Boa de Quires
- Vila Boa do Bispo

== Marinha Grande ==
- Marinha Grande
- Moita
- Vieira de Leiria

== Marvão ==
- Beirã
- Santa Maria de Marvão
- Santo António das Areias
- São Salvador da Aramenha

== Matosinhos ==
- Custóias
- Guifões
- Lavra
- Leça da Palmeira
- Leça do Balio
- Matosinhos
- Perafita, Matosinhos
- Santa Cruz do Bispo
- São Mamede de Infesta
- Senhora da Hora

== Mealhada ==
- Antes
- Barcouço
- Casal Comba
- Luso
- Mealhada
- Pampilhosa
- Vacariça
- Ventosa do Bairro

== Mêda ==
- Aveloso
- Barreira
- Carvalhal
- Casteição
- Coriscada
- Fonte Longa
- Longroiva
- Marialva
- Meda
- Outeiro de Gatos
- Pai Penela
- Poço do Canto
- Prova
- Rabaçal
- Ranhados
- Vale Flor

== Melgaço ==
- Alvaredo
- Castro Laboreiro
- Chaviães
- Cousso
- Cristoval
- Cubalhão
- Fiães
- Gave
- Lamas de Mouro
- Paços
- Paderne
- Parada do Monte
- Penso
- Prado
- Remoães
- Roussas
- São Paio
- Vila

== Mértola ==
- Alcaria Ruiva
- Corte do Pinto
- Espírito Santo
- Mértola
- Santana de Cambas
- São João dos Caldeireiros
- São Miguel do Pinheiro
- São Pedro de Solis
- São Sebastião dos Carros

== Mesão Frio ==
- Barqueiros
- Cidadelhe
- Mesão Frio (Santa Cristina)
- Mesão Frio (São Nicolau)
- Oliveira
- Vila Jusã
- Vila Marim

== Mira ==
- Carapelhos
- Mira
- Praia de Mira
- Seixo

== Miranda do Corvo ==
- Lamas
- Miranda do Corvo
- Rio Vide
- Semide
- Vila Nova

== Miranda do Douro ==
- Águas Vivas
- Atenor
- Cicouro
- Constantim
- Duas Igrejas
- Genísio
- Ifanes
- Malhadas
- Miranda do Douro
- Palaçoulo
- Paradela
- Picote
- Póvoa
- São Martinho de Angueira
- Sendim
- Silva
- Vila Chã de Braciosa

== Mirandela ==
- Abambres
- Abreiro
- Aguieiras
- Alvites
- Avantos
- Avidagos
- Barcel
- Bouça
- Cabanelas
- Caravelas
- Carvalhais
- Cedães
- Cobro
- Fradizela
- Franco
- Frechas
- Freixeda
- Lamas de Orelhão
- Marmelos
- Mascarenhas
- Mirandela
- Múrias
- Navalho
- Passos
- Pereira
- Romeu
- São Pedro Velho
- São Salvador
- Suçães
- Torre de Dona Chama
- Vale de Asnes
- Vale de Gouvinhas
- Vale de Salgueiro
- Vale de Telhas
- Valverde, Mirandela
- Vila Boa
- Vila Verde

== Mogadouro ==
- Azinhoso
- Bemposta
- Bruçó
- Brunhoso
- Brunhozinho
- Castanheira
- Castelo Branco
- Castro Vicente
- Meirinhos
- Mogadouro
- Paradela
- Penas Roias
- Peredo da Bemposta
- Remondes
- Saldanha
- Sanhoane
- São Martinho do Peso
- Soutelo
- Tó (Portugal)
- Travanca
- Urrós
- Vale da Madre
- Vale de Porco
- Valverde, Mogadouro
- Ventozelo
- Vila de Ala
- Vilar de Rei
- Vilarinho dos Galegos

== Moimenta da Beira ==
- Aldeia de Nacomba
- Alvite
- Arcozelos
- Ariz
- Baldos
- Cabaços
- Caria
- Castelo
- Leomil
- Moimenta da Beira
- Nagosa
- Paradinha
- Passô
- Pêra Velha
- Peva
- Rua
- Sarzedo
- Segões
- Sever
- Vilar

== Moita ==
- Alhos Vedros
- Baixa da Banheira
- Gaio-Rosário
- Moita
- Sarilhos Pequenos
- Vale da Amoreira

== Monção ==
- Abedim
- Anhões
- Badim
- Barbeita
- Barroças e Taias
- Bela
- Cambeses
- Ceivães
- Cortes
- Lapela
- Lara
- Longos Vales
- Lordelo
- Luzio
- Mazedo
- Merufe
- Messegães
- Monção
- Moreira
- Parada
- Pias
- Pinheiros
- Podame
- Portela
- Riba de Mouro
- Sá
- Sago
- Segude
- Tangil
- Troporiz
- Troviscoso
- Trute
- Valadares

== Monchique ==
- Alferce
- Marmelete
- Monchique

== Mondim de Basto ==
- Atei
- Bilhó
- Campanhó
- Ermelo
- Mondim de Basto
- Paradança
- Pardelhas
- Vilar de Ferreiros

== Monforte ==
- Assumar
- Monforte
- Santo Aleixo
- Vaiamonte

== Montalegre ==
- Cabril
- Cambeses do Rio
- Cervos
- Chã
- Contim
- Covelães
- Covelo do Gerês
- Donões
- Ferral
- Fervidelas
- Fiães do Rio
- Gralhas
- Meixedo
- Meixide
- Montalegre
- Morgade
- Mourilhe
- Negrões
- Outeiro
- Padornelos
- Padroso
- Paradela
- Pitões das Junias
- Pondras
- Reigoso
- Salto
- Santo André
- Sarraquinhos
- Sezelhe
- Solveira
- Tourém
- Venda Nova
- Viade de Baixo
- Vila da Ponte
- Vilar de Perdizes (São Miguel)

== Montemor-o-Novo ==
- Cabrela
- Ciborro
- Cortiçadas
- Foros de Vale de Figueira
- Lavre
- Nossa Senhora da Vila
- Nossa Senhora do Bispo
- Santiago do Escoural
- São Cristóvão
- Silveiras

== Montemor-o-Velho ==
- Abrunheira
- Arazede
- Carapinheira
- Ereira
- Gatões
- Liceia
- Meãs do Campo
- Montemor-o-Velho
- Pereira
- Santo Varão
- Seixo de Gatões
- Tentúgal
- Verride
- Vila Nova da Barca

== Montijo ==
- Afonsoeiro
- Alto-Estanqueiro-Jardia
- Atalaia
- Canha
- Montijo
- Pegões
- Santo Isidro de Pegões
- Sarilhos Grandes

== Mora ==
- Brotas
- Cabeção
- Mora
- Pavia

== Mortágua ==
- Almaça
- Cercosa
- Cortegaça
- Espinho
- Marmeleira
- Mortágua
- Pala
- Sobral
- Trezói
- Vale de Remígio

== Moura ==
- Amareleja
- Moura (Santo Agostinho)
- Moura (São João Baptista)
- Póvoa de São Miguel
- Safara
- Santo Aleixo da Restauração
- Santo Amador
- Sobral da Adiça

== Mourão ==
- Granja
- Luz
- Mourão

== Murça ==
- Candedo
- Carva
- Fiolhoso
- Jou
- Murça
- Noura
- Palheiros
- Valongo de Milhais
- Vilares

== Murtosa ==
- Bunheiro
- Monte
- Murtosa
- Torreira
