= Monastery of Santa Maria de Maceira Dão =

- Royal Monastery of Santa Maria
- Mosteiro de Santa Maria de Maceira Dão
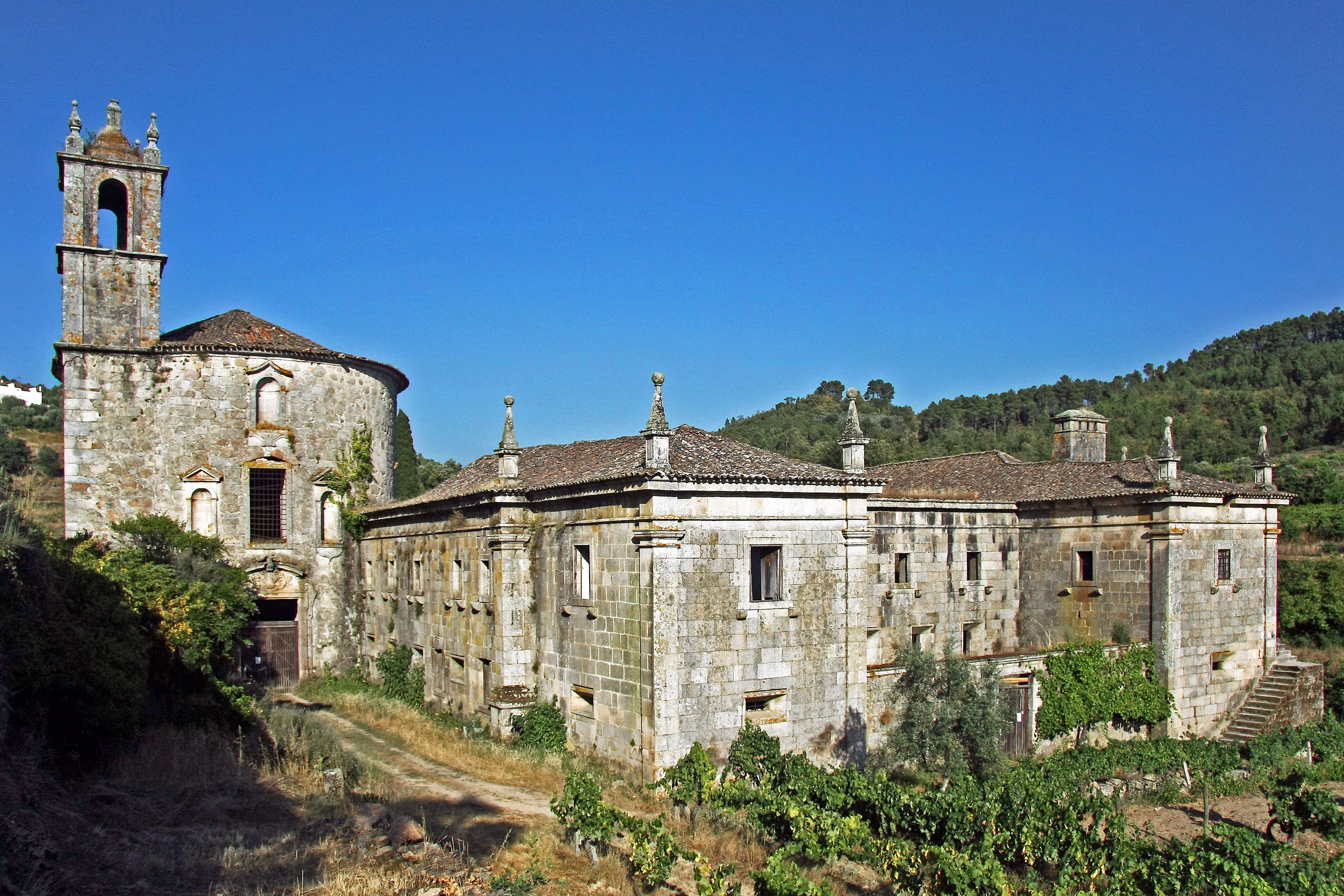
- Monastery of Santa Maria de Maceira Dão
- 40°36′58.05″N 7°49′37.74″W
- Location: Viseu, Dão-Lafões, Centro
- Country: Portugal

History
- Dedication: Blessed Virgin Mary

Architecture
- Style: Mannerist, Baroque

Specifications
- Length: 63.44 m (208.1 ft)
- Width: 49.82 m (163.5 ft)

The Monastery of Santa Maria de Maceira Dão (Portuguese: Mosteiro de Santa Maria de Maceira Dão) is a monastery in the civil parish of Fornos de Maceira Dão, in the municipality of Mangualde in the Portuguese central subregion of Dão-Lafões, classifies as National Monuments (Portuguese: Monumento Nacional).

== History ==
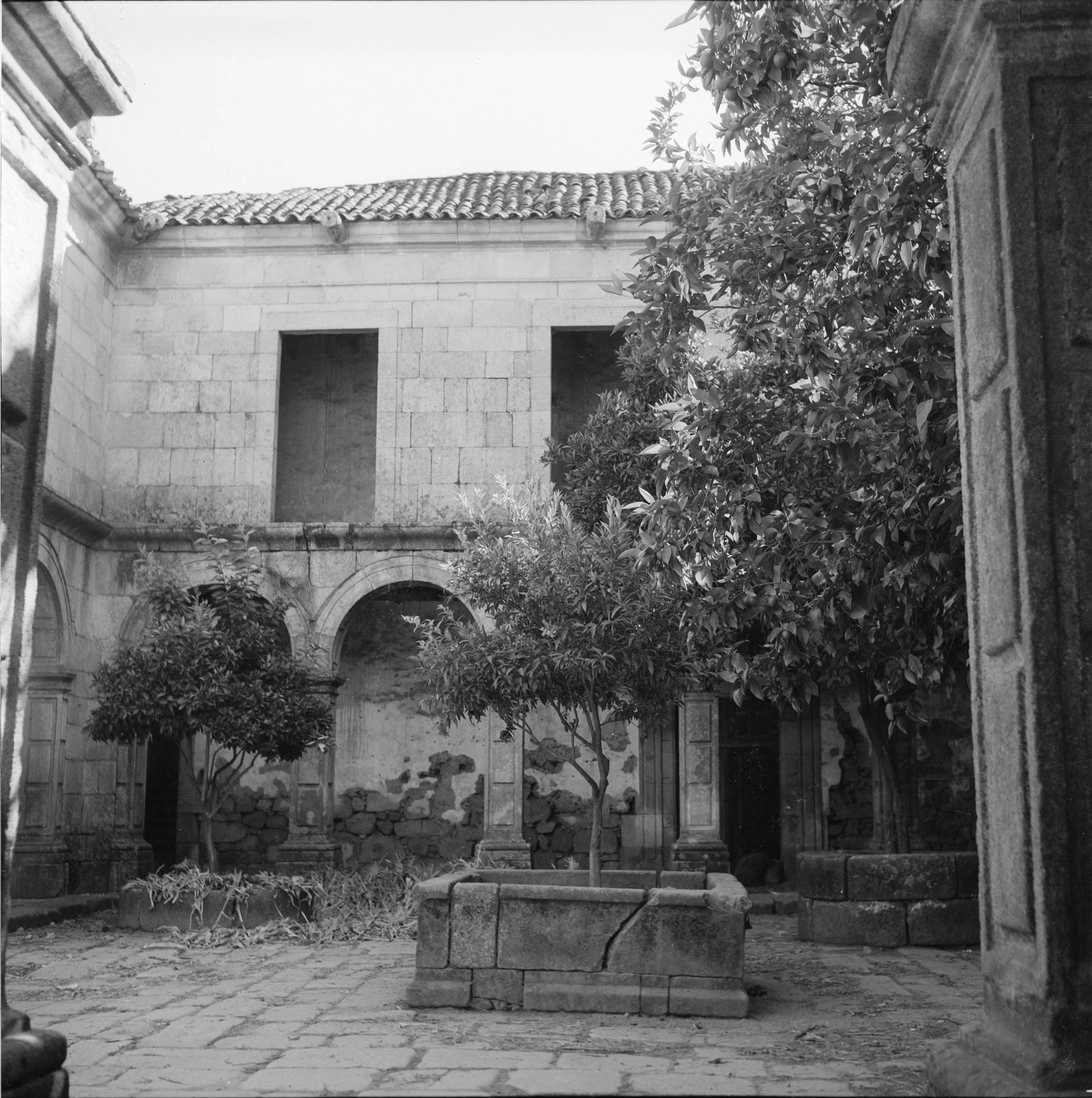
Historic photo of monastery, c. 1960-1970

King Afonso Henriques and Queen Mafalda donated, in gratitude to the clergy of Rodrigo Esomenis, land to the medic Soeiro Teodoniz, representing parcels in Echega, Godesteo, Sendino, Alvito and Taoi, in Travanca de Tavares, that included houses, vegetable gardens, plantations, water and pastureland in July 1154. The medic abandoned his profession (in 1161) and founded a small monastery associated with the Church of Santa Maria, in Moimenta da Beira. Garcia Viegas and Godilha Moniz later sold their lands in Maceira to Soeiro. In 1162, D. Odório, bishop of Viseu, transferred the church in Moimenta de Azurara to the fledgling monastery, without imposing any tributes. On 1 September 1165, Afonso Pais donates to the monastery a farm, following Benedictine observances, which was complimented in 1170 by Gonçalo Pais and Guterres, with the latter in donating lands in Maceira Dão, where they friars would move.

The monastery was founded in 1173 in its actual location, by abbot D. Soeiro Teodoniz, following the Benedictine tradition, and on 31 October, Afonso Henriques established and fixed the limits of the new institution, falling into regal protection. A decade later, in 1188, the monastery joined the Cistercian Order, and began depending on the regional authority of Alcobaça, until their extinction. Regal patronage continued in the 13th century, as both Afonso II and Afonso III supported the church with small endowments. In the meantime, between 1192 and 1208, the bishop, D. Martinho, bought several lands in the region of Trancoso.

Inocêncio XIII assumed the protection of the monastery, and conferred on it all the possessions that have been returned, after the monastery was converted to a Benedictine temple. Around this time (1230) the building was already well endowed financially, its sacristy included three silver chalices, and the monastery boasted 11 servants. Many of the monastery's possessions continued to flow from the patronage of the nobility: in 1294, the chapel to Santa Catarina and guard houses were supported by D. Teresa Afonso Gata; and King Denis left 200 pounds in his will. Meanwhile, annual lands rents included 300 pounds (1320), and the monastery owned 1600 properties, that included farms, vineyards, cellars, mills, fruit orchards and olive fields (485 of these were located in Mangualde, but the remaining included land in Algodres, Aveiro, Besteiros, Folgosinho, Gouveia, Manteigas, Matança, Melo, Mões, Penalva, Sátão, Seia, Senhorim, Tavares, Trancoso, Viseu and Vouzela. Further, the Cistercian clergy also had five military redoubts including in the monastery, Outeiro, Granja (Fagilde), Moimenta and Figueiredo de Seia, in addition to many houses within their territory. By 1526, the monastery included 12 monks, in addition to the abbot and various servants, and its personal possessions were worth 80$000 réis.

Yet, during the, 21–22 December 1532, visit of French abbot Bronseval, from Clairvaux, the cleric opined on the poverty of the monastery, referring to a "small and badly constructed [building] without refectory and regular kitchen". These comments were received by the bishopric in Alcobaça, who sent Father António de Almoster the following year to Maceira Dão, in order to evaluate the state of the congregation. There is no indication if the building received any improvements.

By 1553, the rents received at the monastery were superior to 300$000 réis, and in 1560, the incorporation of female monastery of São João de Vale de Medeiros, resulted in an increase in the total income at the monastery. The number of friars reached a maximum of ten in 1564, reaching the limit for the community, at the time. In 1567 the abbots begin to be elected by triennium.

In 1613, a project to reconstruct the cloister and many of the convent's dependencies began. These projects would persist off-and-on until 1668–1669, with the termination of the reconstruction of the main portico. Around 1632, the number of friars surpasses 15 clerics.

In February 1666, the monastery contracts Sebastião da Mota to execute a silver thurible, similar to those used in the Chapel of Senhor, in the Cathedral of Viseu.

Some of the monastery's properties in Fornos de Algodres were sold, on 28 December 1720, to Manuel de Gouveia in order to pay the costs of public works. On 2 March 1744, the abbot contracts José Ribeiro Alves and João Martins (Santiago de Encourado, Barcelos), João da Costa Coelho (Eixo, Barcelos) and João Fernandes Ribeiro (São João de Tarouca) to rebuild the church, dedicated to Nossa Senhora da Assunção (Our Lady of the Assumption), for 6.100$000 réis, and included all the material costs. A similar project was undertaken in the second half of the 18th century, this time to the Chapel of Senhora da Cabeça (Lady of the Head), at a time when the monastery had 17 cells for its clergy. The original project on the main church was completed by the stonemasons José Duarte (São Miguel de Fontoura, Valença) and António Barbosa da Cunha (Ferreira de Coura, Viana) in 1779. Once this project was completed, the monastery contracted (on 28 Setembro 1779) José da Fonseca Ribeiro to make the chancel. Pascoal José Parente moved to the monastery in 1786 in order to complete several paintings, including specifically the "Sagrada Família" (Sacred Family).

By the time of the French invasion of Portugal in 1810, the Chapel of Nossa Senhora da Cabeça was not yet completed. In 1834, under the anti-clerical reforms of the Liberal government, the convent was closed. A formal inventory of the possessions and properties owned by the monastery began on 14 June 1834, with the buildings and site sold to a businessman in Visue: António da Silva. On 13 November 1835, in an ordinance, signed by Minister Silva Carvalho, the bell and clock were given to the Santa Casa da Misericórdia of Mangualde.

Two years later, in 1837, the redoubt was incorporated into the municipality of Mangualde.

The documents from the extinct convent, deposited in the seminary in Viseu were destroyed after a fire.

On 31 July 1845, the Irmandade das Almas (Brotherhood of Souls) in Mangualde, purchase two lateral altarpieces and a painting of the "Fuga para o Egipto" (Flight into Egypt) for 48$000 réis.

=== Republic ===
After the mismanagement of various property-owners and the Rosada family from Tibaldinho, which almost left it in ruins, the monastery was bought by António Jorge Ferreira, on 22 Abril 1965, for 728.720$00 réis.

During a municipal council session, on 15 May 1978, a proposal to classify various properties in Mangualde, including the monastery, was debated. A petition was sent to the Director General of Cultural Patrimony (Portuguese: Director Geral do Património Cultural) on 16 May, requesting that the monastery be classified as a property of public interest (Portuguese: Imóvel de Interesse Público). Throughout the 20th century several minor projects were completed to stabilize the previous damage: a new door was completed for the church; a cement staircase was added to the principal facade; a partial repair, in cement, of the right, lateral facade was completed; and the opening of new access-ways were undertaken.

Yet, it would not be until the 10 August 1998, before the Ministry of Culture (Portuguese: Ministro da Cultura) re-classified the building as a National Monument (Portuguese: Monumento Nacional).

In July 2006, a risk assessment of the structure was completed by the Direcção Geral dos Edifícios e Monumentos Nacionais (DGEMN).

== Architecture ==
The monastery is located five kilometres from the centre of the municipal seat of Mangualde, accessed from the Estrada Nacional E.N.16 at the 105.6 kilometres marker, in the village of Vila Garcia, then by the municipal road 1441, along a dirt road towards the Moinhos do Dão. Santa Maria is located in an isolated, rural landscape, situated on a fertile valley of the Dão River. It is set between the Serra de Santo António dos Cabaços and the Serra de Fagilde, relatively close to the settlement of Vila Garcia.

The old monastery has been transformed into the largest wine-producing vineyard in the region, and utilizes many of the principal buildings, constructed in various epochs.

The outside facade is distinguished by a supposedly medieval tower, but some authors opine that it is late-medieval, corroborated by the portico, beveled edges, and a frame formed by staves forming the arch. The monastery is accessible by a staircase on its left lateral façade.

A wall intersects the valley, orientated east to west, crossed by the Ribeira dos Frades (with the same orientation), consisting of three hills: to the east, a steep incline, is the highest point; on the northern slope, a softer topography, with terraces; and in the south, an area of cultivation. Along the floodplain of the valley, is the main convent, with the Chapel of Nossa Senhora da Cabeça along the eastern slope, with scattered agricultural and residential buildings, as well as the property owner's residence, that includes irrigation tanks around the religious building. The main fence is crossed by two dirt roads, north to south, in some areas sloping, as well as a partially paved road, that crosses the Ribeira dos Frades. In the steepest point on the property, occupying a third of the property, is a pine forest, leading to terraced vineyards (occupying the middle third of the land), punctuated by olive trees. Access to the monastery is made the western access, dotted by wayside shrines and terminated by a stone cross.

=== Monastery ===
Located at the end of the dirt road, the monastery is an irregular rectangular plan, composed of various articulated bodies, that includes the convent dependencies, a church to the left entrance and a tower, with tile-covered roofs.

==== Church ====
The main church has a longitudinal plan, composed of an elliptical nave, rectangular presbytery, with chamfered interior angles, forming polygons, divided in two parts: a rectangular tower and, opposite it, an addorsed sacristy. The facades in limestone, are partially constructed with granite masonry and decorated with cornices and awnings. The west wall has a convex profile, with straight gable, dominated by a main portal with a decorated facade cut with ornated curves and cornices that frames a Portuguese escudo (shield), surmounted by a closed crown. Over the portico is a large rectangular window, with salient frame, topped by arch in brick. The windows are flanked and topped by semi-circular niches, each with an arch over Tuscan pilasters with triangular gables.

To the left of the entrance is a rectangular bell-tower, topped by conical spire, with facets marked by pillar wedges and topped by three-stage pinnacles defined by friezes and cornices. The four-bell belfrey is composed of Roman arches presented in salient limestone.
