= Mangualde (parish) =

- Civil parish
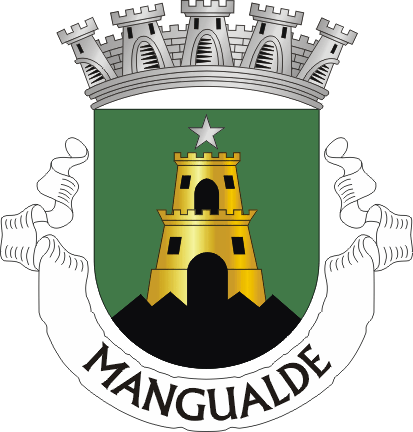
- Coat of arms

- Location in Portugal
- Coordinates: 40°36′21″N 7°45′57″W
- Country: Portugal
- Region: Centro
- Intermunic. comm.: Viseu Dão Lafões
- District: Viseu
- Municipality: Mangualde
- Disbanded: 2013

Area
  - Total: 34.79 km^{2} (13.43 sq mi)

Population (2001)
  - Total: 8,904
  - Density: 260/km^{2} (660/sq mi)
- Time zone: UTC+00:00 (WET)
  - Summer (DST): UTC+01:00 (WEST)

Mangualde is a former civil parish in the municipality of Mangualde, Portugal. In 2013, the parish merged into the new parish Mangualde, Mesquitela e Cunha Alta.
