= Dolmen of Cunha Baixa =

Dolmen in Cunha Baixa, Portugal

- Casa da Orca
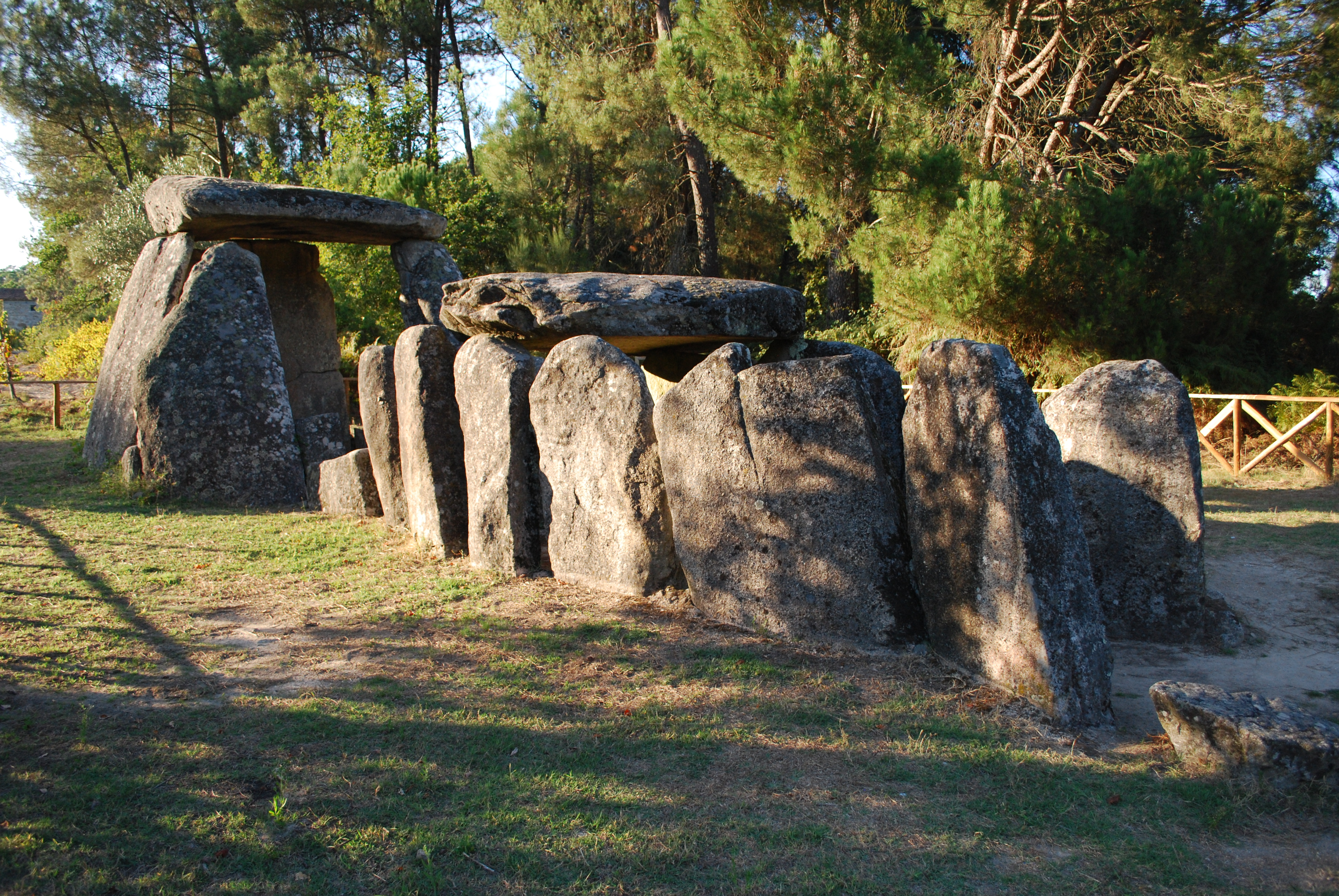
- The dolmen in 2011

- Location in Portugal
- 40°34′12″N 7°46′15″W
- Type: Dolmen
- Location: Viseu, Dão-Lafões, Portugal

History
- Built: c. 2750 BC

Site notes
- Material: Stone
- Elevation: 491 m (1,611 ft)
- Length: 3 m (9.8 ft)
- Width: 10.2 m (33 ft)
- Area: 10.4 km^{2} (4.0 sq mi)
- Discovered: 1892 by Leite de Vasconcelos
- Owner: Portugal
- Public access: Private

The Dolmen of Cunha Baixa (Portuguese: Anta de Cunha Baixa) is a dolmen in the civil parish of Cunha Baixa, in the municipality of Mangualde. It is located in a valley area of the Rio Castelo, between the villages of Cunha Baixa and Espinho.

== History ==
From artifacts discovered in and around the archaeological excavations, scientists have determined that it was constructed between 3000 and 2500 BC. and like numerous other similar sites, is believed to be an ancient Beaker monument. It was discovered in 1892 by Leite de Vasconcelos, who first documented the dolmen, under the authority of Dr. Pais da Cunha, then owner of the property. He found the dolmen damaged, with the interior chambers full of dirt, brambles and rocks of various sizes, some eroded or damaged from the dolmen itself. They proceeded to clean out the chambers and excavate to about 1.17 metres, discovering the first archaeological objects, and then continuing to the table rock. In these excavations Leite de Vasconcelos found in the interior of the dolmen, axes and polished trapezoidal-shaped polished stone adzes; rudely carved flint blades, trapezoidal microliths, triangular and semi-lunar, fragments of red and black pottery, some with ornaments; yellow ochre for body painting; burnt berry seeds; burnt pieces of substances from a forge or furnace; and a human bone.

At the entrance, was an inclined rock slab 1.2 metres by 0.2 metres, with 15 grooves along its edge on both sides. Also in the adjacent terrain, a flint axe, a polished stone implement, six small blades (some jagged) and flint arrowheads, were also discovered. The artifacts were transferred to the National Archaeological Museum (Portuguese: Museu Nacional de Arqueologia) in Lisbon.

It was declared a National Monument (Portuguese: Monumento Nacional) on 16 June 1910.

In 1934, Georg and Vera Leisner carried-out a plan of the site, and cut a section from the dolmen. By 1955, Irisalva Moita encountered the dolmen surrounded by scrub and the corridor obstructed by rocks.

A restoration and cleaning of the site, under Raquel Vilaça and Domingos Cruz (1987), solicited the A.C.A.B. and the Central Region Archaeological Service (Portuguese: Serviço Regional de Arqueologia da Zona Centro), with authorization from the IPPC. A similar cleaning was undertaken in 1994 that included cleaning the monument and the area circling the site.

== Architecture ==
Located along the municipal roadway connecting Cunha Baixa with Espinho, the site is 0.8 kilometres along a footpath to a bridge: 300 metres by foot between two properties in the locality of Orca, or Casa da Moura. It is situated in a rural, fertile plain alongside a river, isolated from view and encircled by vineyards to the south and east, and pine forests to north and northwest, delimited by a wood and wire fence.

Cunha Baixa comprises a main chamber and corridor, although there are no remnants of body within its chamber. The dolmen, is a large polygonal shape enclosure, covered by a great slab of rock, of similarly large dimensions. This main chamber is 3 metres wide, and 3.2 metres high, formed from 9 vertical slabs, some fractured or incomplete. The entrance rock is parallel to the main stone and inclined towards the interior. The roof-stone is a long rounded rectangular slab, 4.5 metres in diameter.

The corridor is 7.2 meters long, at a height of 1.4 metres, oriented along the southeast of the main chamber. It is built from 8 vertical slabs on either side (a few reinforced by steel beams), forming side-walls that are wider in the mid-area and converge slightly towards the main chamber entrance. The vertical slabs are largely square, although some trapezoid and triangular rock pieces are located in the chamber. At the middle of the corridor, another trapezoidal roof slab, smaller than the first covers only the middle part of the corridor.

The pavement of the dolmen is regular, composed of granite rock, with a total surface area of 10.4 metres.

In some places there are remnants of carvings (or vestiges), such as pitting or scaring.
