= Maceira =

Maceira is the name of several towns in Portugal:

- Maceira (Fornos de Algodres): parish in the municipality of Fornos de Algodres
- Maceira (Leiria): parish in the municipality of Leiria
- Maceira (Torres Vedras): parish in the municipality of Torres Vedras
- Fornos de Maceira Dão: parish in the municipality of Mangualde
- Moimenta de Maceira Dão: parish in the municipality of Mangualde
- Maceira (Montelavar): a village in the parish of Montelavar
