= Santiago de Cassurrães =

- Civil parish
- Location in Portugal
- Coordinates: 40°34′44″N 7°42′17″W
- Country: Portugal
- Region: Centro
- Intermunic. comm.: Viseu Dão Lafões
- District: Viseu
- Municipality: Mangualde
- Disbanded: 2013

Area
  - Total: 22.34 km^{2} (8.63 sq mi)

Population (2001)
  - Total: 1,412
  - Density: 63/km^{2} (160/sq mi)
- Time zone: UTC+00:00 (WET)
  - Summer (DST): UTC+01:00 (WEST)

Santiago de Cassurrães is a former civil parish in the municipality of Mangualde, Portugal. In 2013, the parish merged into the new parish Santiago de Cassurrães e Póvoa de Cervães.
