= Alcafache =

- Civil parish
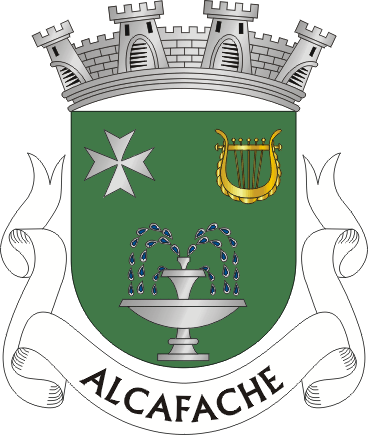
- Coat of arms

- Location in Portugal
- Coordinates: 40.60°N 7.86°W
- Country: Portugal
- Region: Centro
- Intermunic. comm.: Viseu Dão Lafões
- District: Viseu
- Municipality: Mangualde

Area
  - Total: 12.88 km^{2} (4.97 sq mi)

Population (2011)
  - Total: 921
  - Density: 71.5/km^{2} (185/sq mi)
- Time zone: UTC+00:00 (WET)
  - Summer (DST): UTC+01:00 (WEST)
- Postal code: 3530
- Patron: São Vicente

Alcafache is a freguesia in the municipality (concelho) of Mangualde in the Portuguese central subregion of Dão-Lafões. The population in 2011 was 921, in an area of 12.88 km².

== History ==
The Romans crossed these lands, building some bridges along the margins of the Dão River, near the thermal springs, possibly indicating their acknowledgement of the region's aesthetic importance.

Alcafache has its origin in an Arab settlement, dating from the 13th century, whose toponymy evolved from Carafáche and later Alcaafáchi. The parish, which at one time was a municipality in its own right, received its first foral (charter) in 1514, during the reign of King Manuel I. The region was consecrated to the Order of Malta at that time, and included the places Casal Mendo, Casal Sendinho, Aldeia de Carvalho, Tibaldinho, Mosteirinho and Banho.

The most emblematic symbol of this region is the thermal baths of Banho. Although, today, these thermae are situated in another municipality (Viseu), Alcafache is the location for many of the hotels and retreats associated with visitors to the thermal spas. Occupied intensely from April to November, the warm sulphur-rich waters are popular with elderly and those with rheumatism, muscular-skeletal illnesses and respiratory conditions (such as rhinitis and sinusitis). The thermal spas in the region were recognized as far back as the 15th century, when a shelter constructed by a deacon from the Sé Cathedral of Viseu, to gather the poor who needed this form of treatment.

On 11 September 1985 a train crash occurred along the CP's Beira Alta railway line near Alcafache, resulting in the deaths of 56 passengers (officially), yet causing many still unaccounted for deaths.

== Geography ==
Alcafache is located roughly halfway between the centres of Viseu and Nelas.

== Culture ==
Alcafache is recognized for the hundred-year tradition of embroidery, the bordados de Tibaldinho, which are very sought after for their quality.

The regions age is also reflected in the Banda Filarmónica de Tibaldinho, the philharmonic band, that continues to play at many social events. Alcafache also constructed their Associação Cultural de Tibaldinho (Tibaldinho Cultural Association) and the Grupo Coral de Alcafache (Choral Group of Alcafache), two entities that attract local participants, associated with the liturgical group Jovens Cristãos (Christian Youth).

Throughout the year, starting in January, the parish celebrates both secular and religious festivals, which include the following: feast of Santa Bárbara (4 December), the festival of Nossa Senhora da Piedade (September), São Frutuoso (first Sunday following Easter), Santa Cruz (3 May or following Sunday), Nossa Senhora dos Prazeres (Sunday of Pascoela), São Lourenço (10 August) and São Vicente (22 January).
