= Abrunhosa-a-Velha =

- Civil parish
- Location in Portugal
- Coordinates: 40.579°N 7.643°W
- Country: Portugal
- Region: Centro
- Intermunic. comm.: Viseu Dão Lafões
- District: Viseu
- Municipality: Mangualde

Area
  - Total: 17.30 km^{2} (6.68 sq mi)
- Elevation: 423 m (1,388 ft)

Population (2011)
  - Total: 563
  - Density: 33/km^{2} (84/sq mi)
- Time zone: UTC+00:00 (WET)
  - Summer (DST): UTC+01:00 (WEST)
- Postal code: 3530
- Patron: Santa Cecília

Abrunhosa-a-Velha is a civil parish in the municipality of Mangualde in the central sub-region of Dão-Lafões in Portugal. The population in 2011 was 563, in an area of 17.30 km².

== Geography ==
The parish includes several settlements, not only including Abrunhosa-a-Velha, but also Vila Mendo de Tavares and Gouveia-Gare: a population of 880 inhabitants.

It is served by rail services through its Abrunhosa-a-Velha and Gouveia railway stations.

== History ==
Around 2 kilometres (1.2 mi) from the main village is the hermitage of Nossa Senhora dos Verdes, which was founded around 1600, which is the basis for the modern parish. A pillory classified as property of public interest (Decree 23122, 11 October 1933), served the civil judge during the period, when that official occupied a local building (identifiable the building with a 15th-century Manueline window).

Around 1608, a papal bull conceded indulgences to the Irmandade de Nossa Senhora dos Verdes de Abrunhosa-a-Velha (Brotherhood of Nossa Senhora dos Verdes). The chapel was still standing following a plague of grasshoppers that destroyed the municipality, part of Fornos de Algodres, across the Serra do Bom Sucesso and parish of Castelo (in Penalva do Castelo). Since this period, on the first Monday of Holy Spirit, a pilgrimage (both religious and devotional) occurs in the parish.

When in the 18th century, Pais Amaral de Mangualde was made the donatarys of Abrunhosa-a-Velha, he also received for the small village, the category of vila (town).

In addition to Vila Mendo de Tavares, this region was part of one municipality: Tavares, with its own civil judge and comarca administration. The captain-major and five ordinance officials guarded the outpost, while a superintendency for local tithes was invested in the juízo de fora of Mangualde and Tavares (in addition to two smaller municipalities at the time).

By 1811, the donatary was already part of the royal possessions.

== Culture ==
Annually, the parish is the center of festivals in honour of Saint Cecilia (village of Abrunhosa-a-Velha) and Saint Dominic (in Vila Mendo de Tavares).
