= Tower of Ferreira de Aves =

Coordinates: 40.79860755884757°N 7.6896319457078235°W

- Torre de Ferreira de Aves
- Viseu, Dão-Lafões, Centro in Portugal
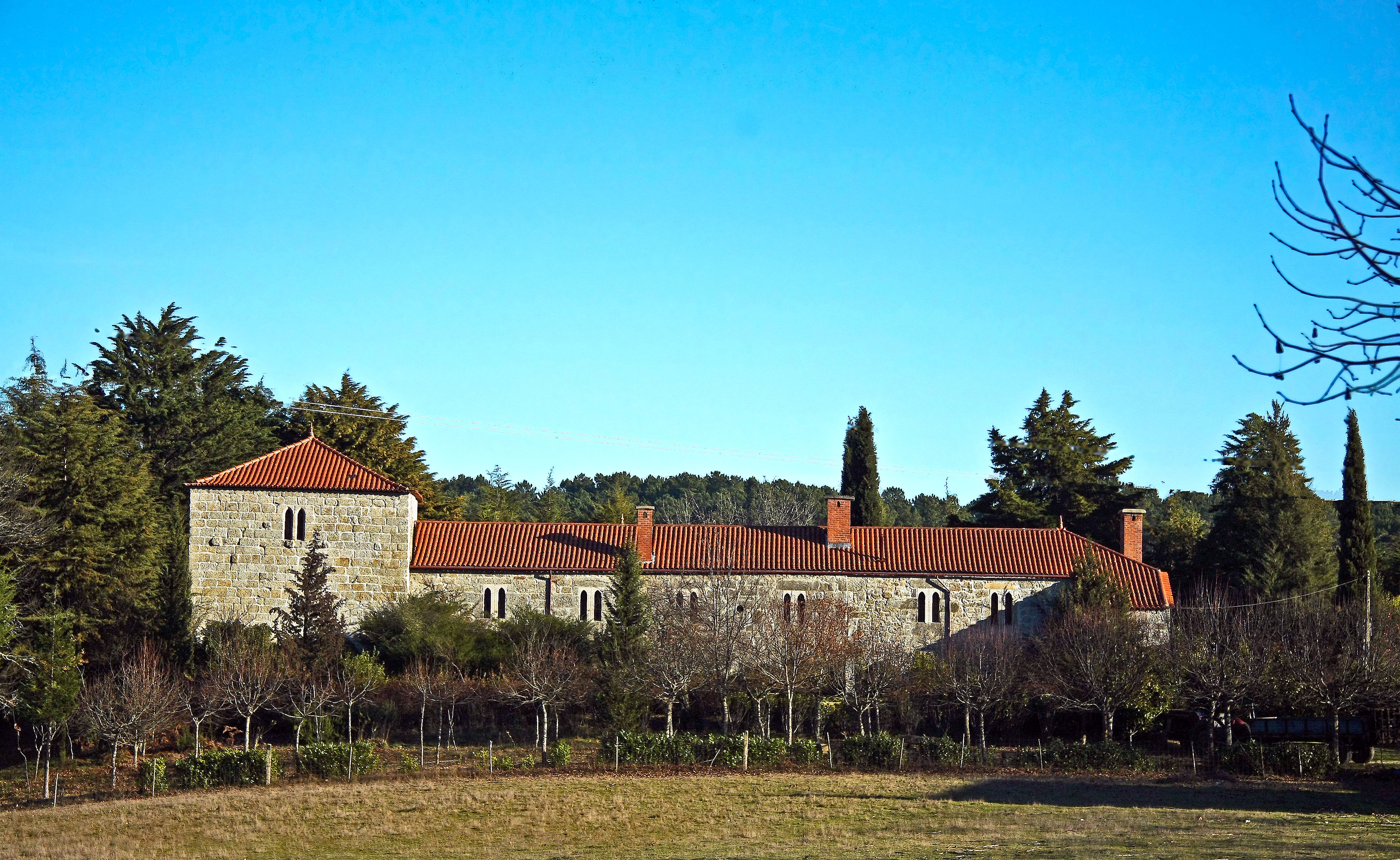

Site information
- Type: Fortification
- Owner: Portuguese Republic
- Open to the public: Private Property

Site history
- Built: 8th century
- Materials: Granite, Tile, Madeira, Glass, Cement

The Tower of Ferreira de Aves (Portuguese: Torre de Ferreira de Aves) is a fortification located in the civil parish of Ferreira de Aves, in the municipality of Sátão, Portuguese Viseu.

== History ==
Tradition suggest that the estate was constructed in 798, after D. Afonso, "o Casto", of Castille defeat the Mouros in the battle of Lamas.

At the beginning of the 12th century, a foral (charter) was issued to the parish of Ferreira de Aves, by Queen D. Teresa. From this period until the 14th century, the lands of Ferreira de Aves pertained to the Pacheco family; in 1126, Paio Fernandes Pires, founder of the Pacheco family, signed a contract with the town of Ferreira de Aves, turning his family into its first signeurial dynasty in the region. In 1156, half the town belong to the Knights Templar, even as they had only arrived in the territory for a short time.

The village of Lamas was named during the 1258 Inquirições (Inquiries) of King D. Afonso III.

A notice between 1331 and 1332 appeared in records, of D. Lopo Fernandes Pacheco, rich honourable man and seigneur of Ferreira (in the Nobiliário do Conde D. Pedro) e and his wife D. Maria Gomes Taveira, who discovered themselves in Paço de Ferreira. The hereditary fiefdom and possessions of the Pachecos would be confiscated in 1385, following João Fernandes Pacheco having allied himself with Castilians forces during the Portuguese Interregnum. The lands and properties of the Pacheco clan were forfeited to the knight, Rui Vasques Coutinho, until 1433. Similarly, on 12 April 1398, King D. John I ordered the confiscation of further possessions of Pachecos, that included the seigneurial titles and lands in Ferreira de Aves. Ultimately, by the end of the 14th century, all lands of Ferreira would be donated to Rui Vasques Coutinho. In August 1451, in the terms of a letter of donation, King D. Afonso V, Martim Afonso de Melo obtained de jure and descendancy, the seigneurial title to Ferreira.

Changes to the estate began in the 15th century, resulting in the opening of the off-centre entranceway and the upper floors, along with the twined freises.

In 1504, D. Rodrigo Afonso de Melo, son of Martim Afonso de Melo and, inheritor of the town of Ferreira de Aves, among others, received the title of Count of Tentúgal, created by King D. Manuel I.

The 1527 Cadastro da População do Reino (Population Cadastre of the Kingdom or official census), the settlement of Lamas was identified as the most populous centre in the municipality.

Sometime in the 1530s, the Counts of Tentúgal received the title of Marques of Ferreira, by King D. John III. In August 1537, D. Álvaro, direct descendant of the first Marquess prematurely died, resulting in his son requesting the title for himself. But, this was not the case, and in 1548 the family line obtained the title of Dukes of Cadaval.

On 27 April 1567, the visitor to Ferreira de Aves ordered the administrator of the chapel of São Miguel to purchase of a chalice, an image of the Archangel Michael and repair the altar footstool. During a visit by Bishop Jorge de Ataíde on 3 November 1577, the chapel administrator was obliged to line the chapel, construct a portico and install new ceiling tile. He was also obliged to acquire new altar linens.

On 6 June 1581, King D. Philip bestowed on the uncle of the claimant (D. Francisco de Melo), the title of Marques of Ferreira. On 26 October 1598, the Countess of Tentúgal, D. Mariana de Castro donated the Chapel of São Miguel, in the interior of the estate to Baltasar Estaço, servant to her brother, D. João de Bragança, who was incapable following the death of Aires de Botelho. In 1630, the chapel was in ruin, resulting in public works to restore the former enclave lasting into 1633. Several years later, in 1657, the chapel was also repaired with donations coming from D. António de Almeida, but by 1670, the visitor ordered the construction of a new chapel.

In the 18th century, the estate was described as encircled by lands cultivated with rye, corn, wheat, sweet chestnut and oak trees. Around the houses were the chapel of Nossa Senhora da Ajuda, and near the ravine, the Chapel of São Miguel, patronized by the masters of Ferreira. The chapel had a presbytery supported by 50 simple, annual masses and two oratories, for which it received 254 alqueires of rye and 14 chickens in payment. By 1702, this meager supported allowed, along with donations the renovation of the retable of the chapel. In 1898, the chapel dedicated to Nossa Senhora do Amparo was re edified by order of D. Maria da Piedade Caetano Álvares Pereira de Melo, 7th Duchess of Cadaval, 9th Marquess of Ferreira and 10th Countess of Tentúgal.

By March 1973, the estate of lands were sold to Hermínio Marques Ferreira. The new property owner was responsible for refurbishing the interiors, updating the ceiling and tile and placement of tile in the upper section.

== Architecture ==
The estate house is situated in a rural area, in a terraced area. The old tower is an archaic feature, addorsed to modern constructions, accessible from an enclosed patio. The group is part of a cultivated area, encircled in the north and west by ditch or moat.

The medieval tower has a rectangular plan, consisting of two floors, circled by two ditches or moats, with a structure that is practical and less decorative. It is marked by window slits, with monolithic lintel, with a Gothic-like portico with semi-spheres, revealing successive alterations to the structure and decoration. Its robust construction implies a building whose purpose was likely defensive.

The rectangular plan has a vertical disposition covered in ceiling tile: it evolved into a two-story structure, with the ground floor buttressed by irregular cornerstones. The principal facade is oriented by the arched portico, with smooth imposed lines, forming six staves, with chamfered and decorated in spheres, elements that are also repeated in the jambs. A pair of twinned freises with pointed arches decorate the second floor. The blind south facade is addorsed to a modern building, with an archaic facade. The western facade is broken by an embrasure, a little above the ground, surmounted by a pair of twin freises. The northern facade includes window slits on the lower floor, with five machillactons and a pair of twinned friezes on the upper floor.

The interior includes a distinct division that occupies the first floor, with wooden ceiling. The first floor has one division only, with staircase that connects to the upper floor made of wood. The second floor has two divisions in wood.
