= Mesquitela =

- Civil parish
- Location in Portugal
- Coordinates: 40°35′03″N 7°44′55″W
- Country: Portugal
- Region: Centro
- Intermunic. comm.: Viseu Dão Lafões
- District: Viseu
- Municipality: Mangualde
- Disbanded: 2013

Area
  - Total: 6.68 km^{2} (2.58 sq mi)

Population (2001)
  - Total: 954
  - Density: 140/km^{2} (370/sq mi)
- Time zone: UTC+00:00 (WET)
  - Summer (DST): UTC+01:00 (WEST)

Mesquitela is a small town in the municipality of Mangualde, Portugal. It was head of a civil parish until the 2013 reform, when it merged into the new parish of Mangualde, Mesquitela e Cunha Alta.

== Heritage sites ==
- Mesquitela House
