= Roda, Portugal =

Village in Portugal

Roda is a village near Mangualde in the district of Viseu, Portugal. It is located at 40°37′00″N 07°47′00″W and has an altitude of 497 m (1633 ft).
