= Espinho (Mangualde) =

- Civil parish
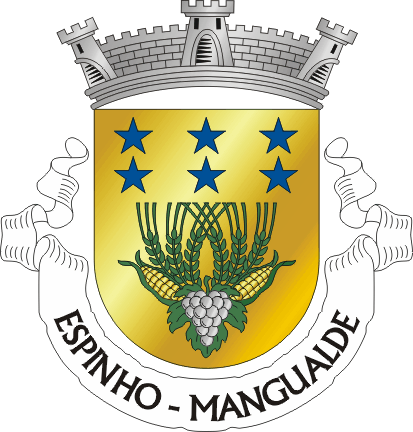
- Coat of arms

- Location in Portugal
- Coordinates: 40.553°N 7.788°W
- Country: Portugal
- Region: Centro
- Intermunic. comm.: Viseu Dão Lafões
- District: Viseu
- Municipality: Mangualde

Area
  - Total: 14.55 km^{2} (5.62 sq mi)

Population (2011)
  - Total: 984
  - Density: 68/km^{2} (180/sq mi)
- Time zone: UTC+00:00 (WET)
  - Summer (DST): UTC+01:00 (WEST)

Espinho is a freguesia in Mangualde, Portugal. The population in 2011 was 984, in an area of 14.55 km^{2}.
