= Moimenta de Maceira Dão e Lobelhe do Mato =

- Civil parish
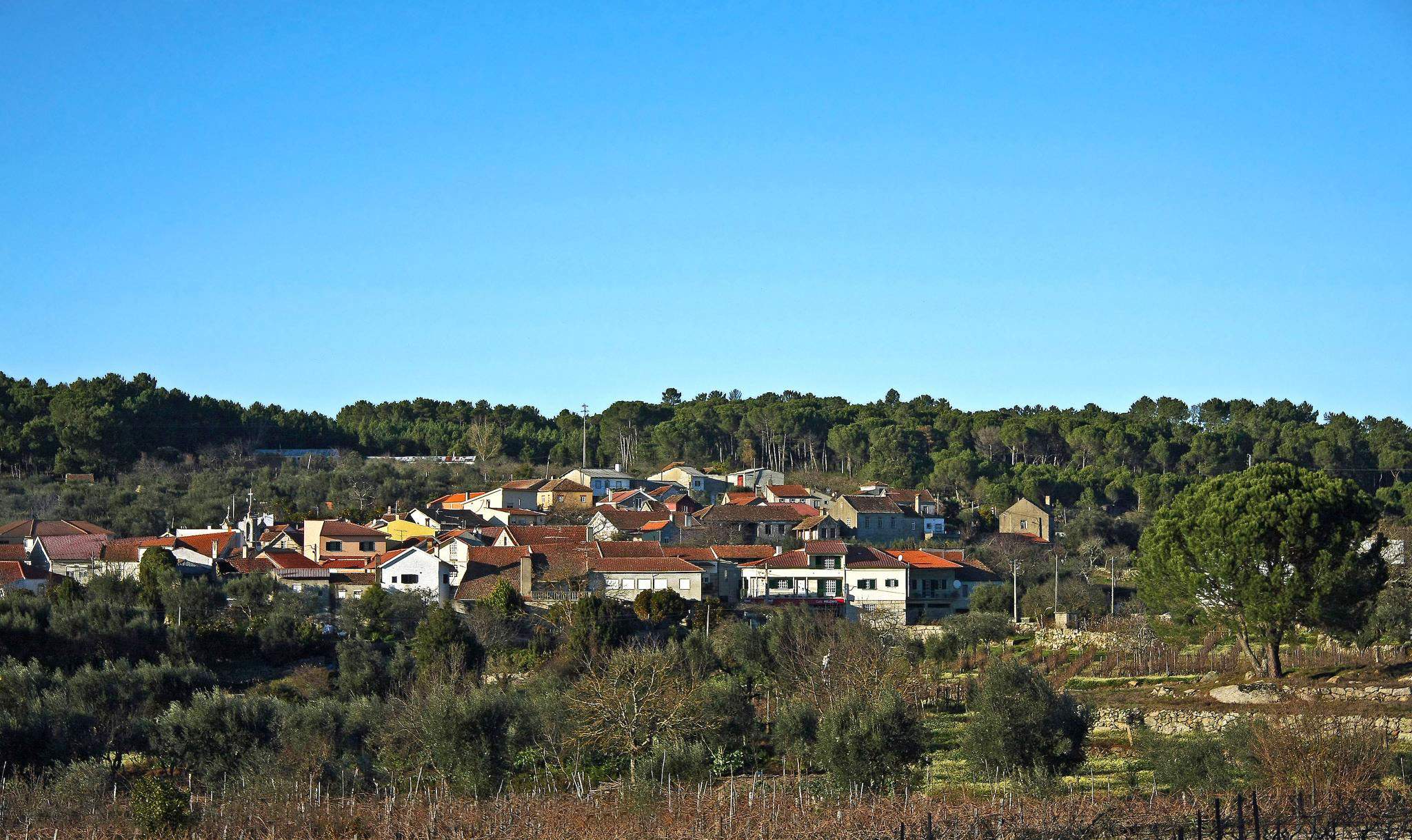

- Location in Portugal
- Coordinates: 40.58°N 7.82°W
- Country: Portugal
- Region: Centro
- Intermunic. comm.: Viseu Dão Lafões
- District: Viseu
- Municipality: Mangualde

Area
  - Total: 7.15 km^{2} (2.76 sq mi)

Population (2011)
  - Total: 773
  - Density: 108/km^{2} (280/sq mi)
- Time zone: UTC+00:00 (WET)
  - Summer (DST): UTC+01:00 (WEST)

Moimenta de Maceira Dão e Lobelhe do Mato is a civil parish in the municipality of Mangualde, Portugal. It was formed in 2013 by the merger of the former parishes Moimenta de Maceira Dão and Lobelhe do Mato. The population in 2011 was 773, in an area of 7.15 km^{2}.
