= São João da Fresta =

- Civil parish
- Location in Portugal
- Coordinates: 40.639°N 7.589°W
- Country: Portugal
- Region: Centro
- Intermunic. comm.: Viseu Dão Lafões
- District: Viseu
- Municipality: Mangualde

Area
  - Total: 7.41 km^{2} (2.86 sq mi)

Population (2011)
  - Total: 208
  - Density: 28.1/km^{2} (72.7/sq mi)
- Time zone: UTC+00:00 (WET)
  - Summer (DST): UTC+01:00 (WEST)

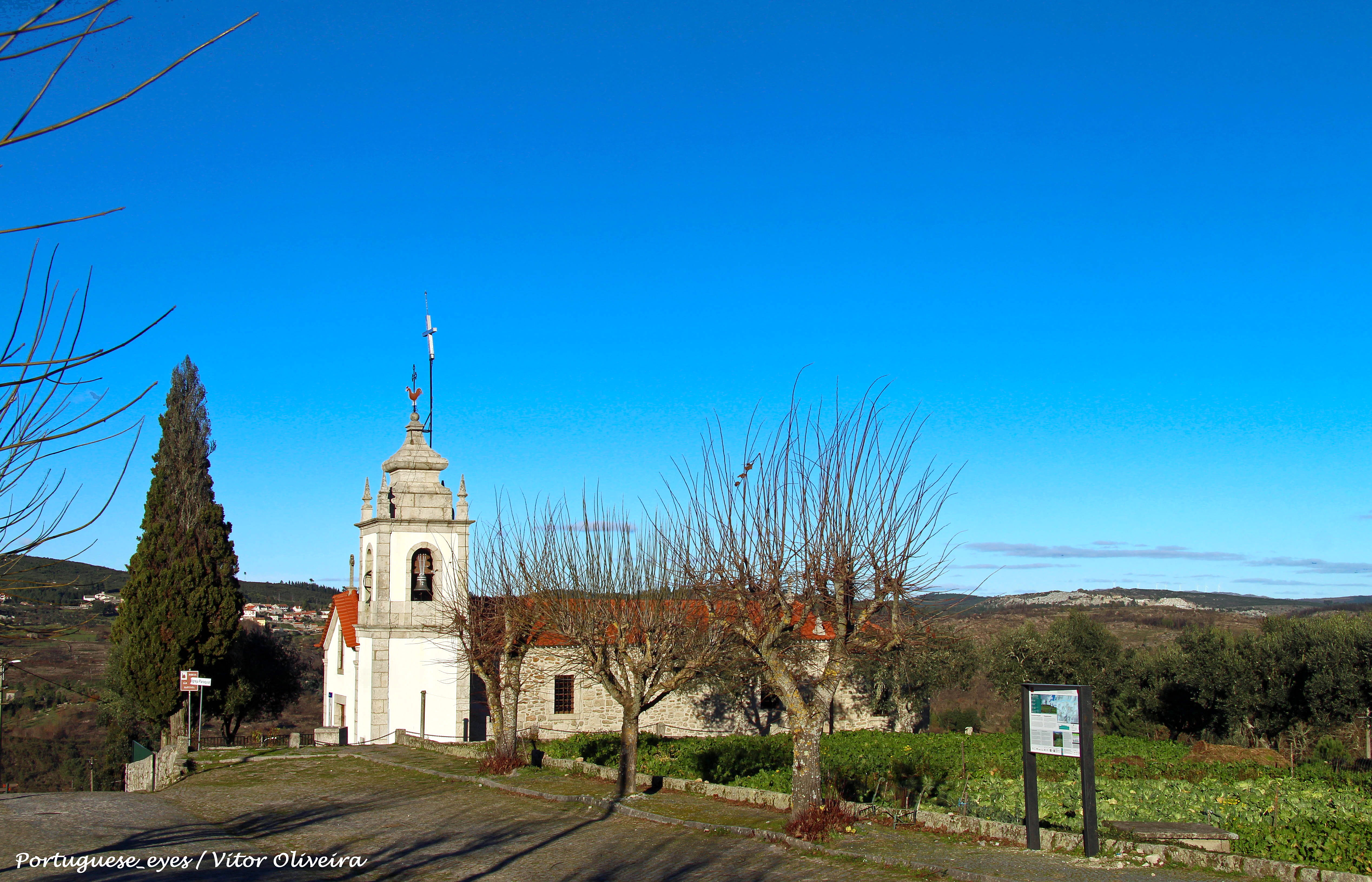
Parish Church of São João da Fresta, Portugal

São João da Fresta is a freguesia in Mangualde, Portugal.

The population in 2011 was 208, in an area of 7.41 km^{2}.
