= Mangualde, Mesquitela e Cunha Alta =

- Civil parish
- Location in Portugal
- Coordinates: 40.61°N 7.77°W
- Country: Portugal
- Region: Centro
- Intermunic. comm.: Viseu Dão Lafões
- District: Viseu
- Municipality: Mangualde

Area
  - Total: 46.25 km^{2} (17.86 sq mi)

Population (2011)
  - Total: 10,407
  - Density: 230/km^{2} (580/sq mi)
- Time zone: UTC+00:00 (WET)
  - Summer (DST): UTC+01:00 (WEST)

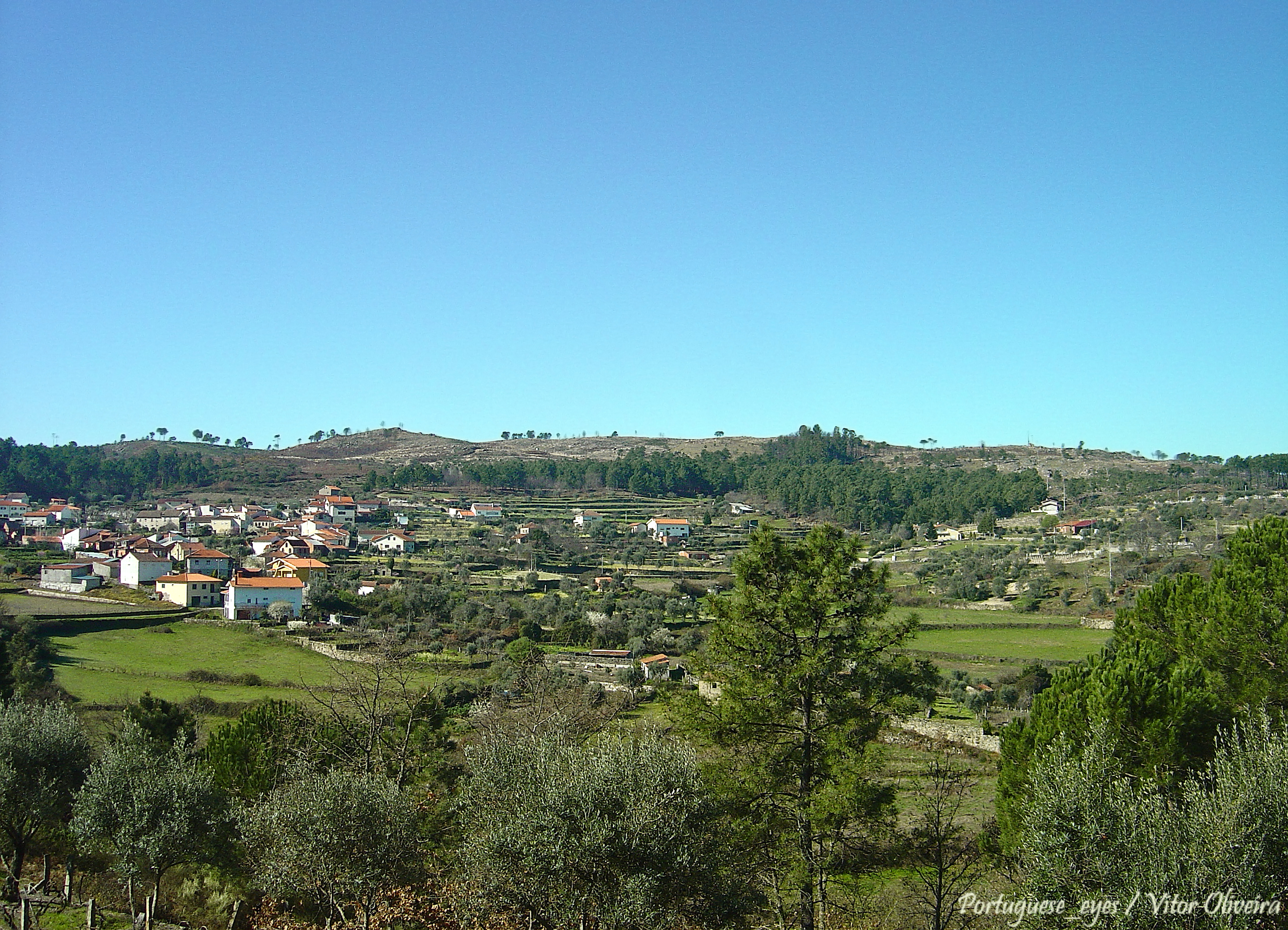
Cunha Alta

Mangualde, Mesquitela e Cunha Alta is a civil parish in the municipality of Mangualde, Portugal. It was formed in 2013 by the merger of the former parishes Mangualde, Mesquitela and Cunha Alta. The population in 2011 was 10,407, in an area of 46.25 km^{2}.
