= Moimenta =

Moimenta may refer to the following places in Portugal:

- Moimenta da Beira, a municipality in the district of Viseu
- Moimenta (Cinfães), a civil parish in the municipality of Cinfães
- Moimenta (Terras de Bouro), a civil parish in the municipality of Terras de Bouro
- Moimenta (Vinhais), a civil parish in the municipality of Vinhais
- Moimenta da Serra, a civil parish in the municipality of Gouveia
- Moimenta de Maceira Dão, a civil parish in the municipality of Mangualde
