= Quintela de Azurara =

- Civil parish
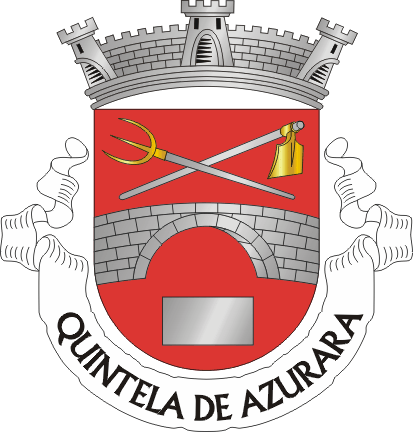
- Coat of arms

- Location in Portugal
- Coordinates: 40.627°N 7.706°W
- Country: Portugal
- Region: Centro
- Intermunic. comm.: Viseu Dão Lafões
- District: Viseu
- Municipality: Mangualde

Area
  - Total: 9.59 km^{2} (3.70 sq mi)

Population (2011)
  - Total: 542
  - Density: 57/km^{2} (150/sq mi)
- Time zone: UTC+00:00 (WET)
  - Summer (DST): UTC+01:00 (WEST)
- Postal code: 3530
- Area code: 232
- Patron: São João Batista

Quintela de Azurara is a civil parish in the municipality of Mangualde, Portugal. The population in 2011 was 542, in an area of 9.59 km².

== History ==
Archaeological remnants found in the parish indicate that settlement in the area extends back to the proto-historic cultures of the castro peoples. Many of the castro fortifications were used by the 13th century are defensible posts, including the Castle of Zurara. The mountain top, situated between Mangualde and Quintela de Azurara, is crowned by a small hermitage, known as Nossa Senhora do Castelo. This "castle" was the seat of the judicial authority of Zurara, and encompassed Quintela. Roman claims to this region include the old bridge, constructed of a single arch, but dating to the 17th century.

The toponymy for the parish is from a Germanic origin, and alludes to an old medieval institution, the Quintana (in this case Quintela is the diminutive derived from quitanella), an appendage of the remote Manoaldu(s) (origin of the centre of Mangualde). Ecclesiastically, Quintela was part of São Julião, whose abbey, Martim Gonçalves, was arrested by King Sancho II, for unknown reasons. After his imprisonment, the monarch partitioned the church and curia to the other parishes of Mangualde, including Quintela, to Mem Euniges (deacon of Coimbra), later to Afonso Mendes, and much later, to Salvador Peres, Sancho II's confessor.

Quintela was a possession of Pedro Álvares Cabral, the famous navigator.

In 1758, from the writings of Father José Leão de Cabral Teixeira (abbey at Quintela), the residents of the parish paid 33000 réis to the old House of the Cabrals, nobles of Belmonte. This sum was distributed annually by the inhabitants of the comarca according to each family's possessions. At this time the parish included the locality of Canelas and, despite corresponding to the dominion of the Church of São João de Zurara, the 1258 Inqueries, Quintela was not even a parish, although the church was called São João da Quintela.

== Geography ==
Quintela de Azurara is located 6 kilometres (3.7 mi) from the seat of the municipality of Mangualde.

== Economy ==
Within its borders is a stannery, named Porto, in addition to several granite quarries: apart from agriculture, the quarrying industries are activities that support the local economy.

== Architecture ==
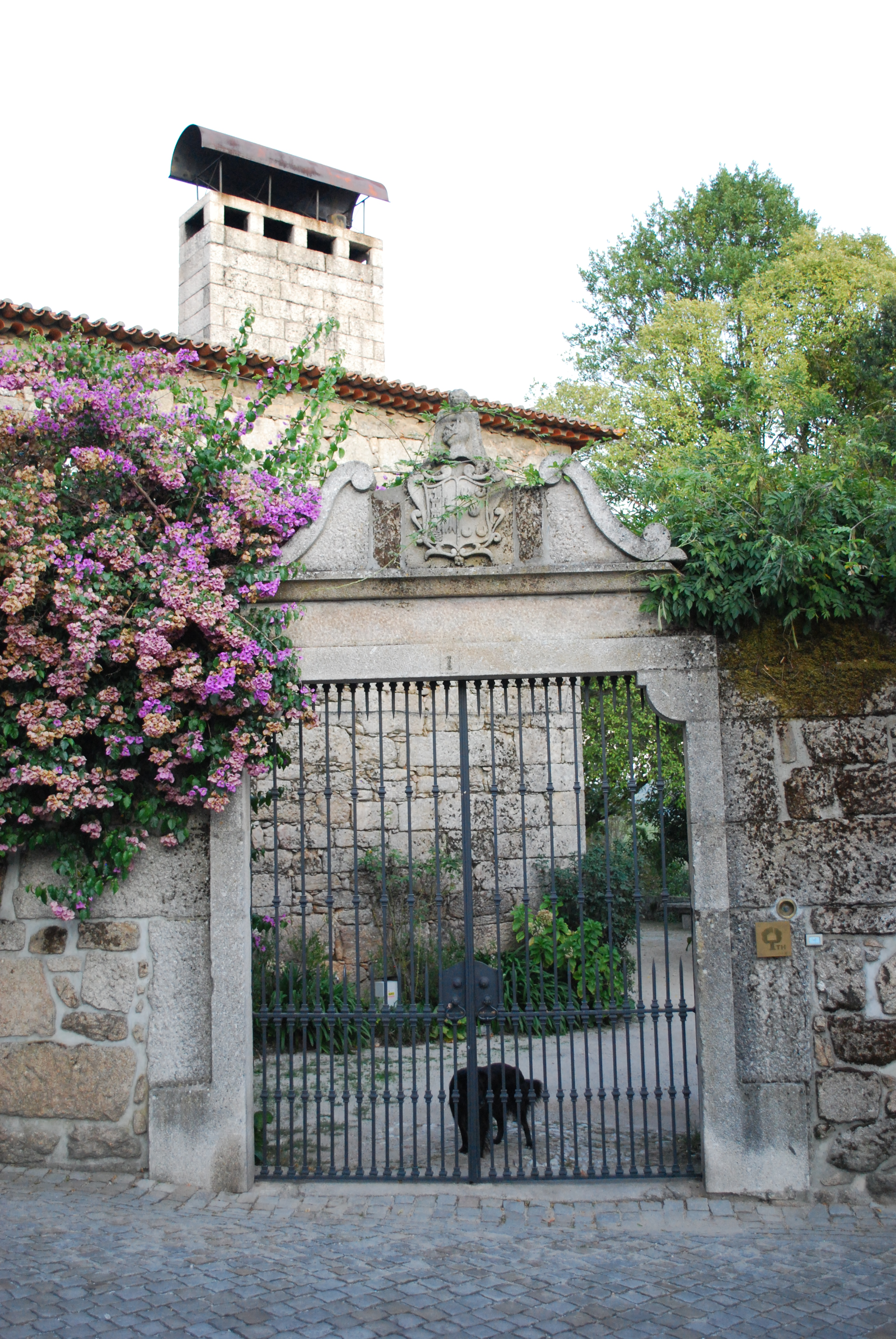
The front gate of the Casa de Quintela, owned by the president of the local municipality between 1950-1960, nephew of João Carlos de Ataíde e Arriaga Cunha Cabral, relation of former President of Portugal Manuel de Arriaga

=== Civic ===
- Bridge of Quintela de Azurara (Portuguese: Ponte em Quintela de Azurara), originally assumed to be of Roman origin, the 17th-century bridge is constructed of a single arch;
- Residence of Quintela (Portuguese: Casa de Quintela), it base was a medieval building located on the present site, but its current form was established in the 16th century (although it was reconstructed in the 18th century);
- Mills of Coval (Portuguese: Moínhos de Coval), many windmills exist in the municipality of Mangualde, that constitute an important industrial patrimony; in the settlement of Coval, just four mills, remain of a zone that had tens of mills supporting the local economy. These structures, constructed of granite, with aqueducts to transport water from the local countryside, dotted the landscape to as late as the middle of the 20th century: today, all are in ruin;

=== Religious ===
- Church of São João Baptista (Portuguese: Igreja de São João Baptista)

== Culture ==
The parish's patron saint is John the Baptist (in his form as São João Batista), and the community celebrates their annual feast day on 24 June annually.
