= Santiago de Cassurrães e Póvoa de Cervães =

- Civil parish
- Location in Portugal
- Coordinates: 40.58°N 7.70°W
- Country: Portugal
- Region: Centro
- Intermunic. comm.: Viseu Dão Lafões
- District: Viseu
- Municipality: Mangualde

Area
  - Total: 30.03 km^{2} (11.59 sq mi)

Population (2011)
  - Total: 1,414
  - Density: 47/km^{2} (120/sq mi)
- Time zone: UTC+00:00 (WET)
  - Summer (DST): UTC+01:00 (WEST)

Santiago de Cassurrães e Póvoa de Cervães is a civil parish in the municipality of Mangualde, Portugal. It was formed in 2013 by the merger of the former parishes Santiago de Cassurrães and Póvoa de Cervães. The population in 2011 was 1,414, in an area of 30.03 km^{2}.
