= Mangualde (footballer) =

Portuguese footballer

Personal information
- Full name: Ricardo Jorge Marques Duarte
- Date of birth: 14 February 1982 (age 44)
- Place of birth: Mangualde, Portugal
- Height: 1.70 m (5 ft 7 in)
- Position: Right back

Team information
- Current team: Mangualde (coach)

Youth career
- 1993–1995: Mangualde
- 1995–2001: Sporting CP

Senior career*
Years	Team	Apps	(Gls)
2001–2003	Sporting B	38	(0)
2003–2005	Oriental	70	(0)
2005–2008	Paços Ferreira	48	(0)
2008–2009	Freamunde	26	(0)
2009–2011	Doxa	30	(0)
2011–2012	Tondela	15	(0)
2012–2014	Caála		
2015–2016	Lusitano Vildemoinhos	26	(0)
2016–2018	Mangualde		
Total		253	(0)

International career
1998	Portugal U15	4	(0)

Managerial career
- 2018–: Mangualde
- * Club domestic league appearances and goals

Ricardo Jorge Marques Duarte (born 14 February 1982), known as Mangualde, is a Portuguese retired footballer who played as a right back, and is the manager of Grupo Desportivo Mangualde. He was born in Mangualde, Viseu District, Portugal.

== Football career ==
After an unsuccessful stint in Sporting CP's youth academy (never going past the reserves after turning a senior), Mangualde represented Clube Oriental de Lisboa. In the summer of 2005 he signed for Primeira Liga club F.C. Paços de Ferreira, where would be regularly used throughout his three-season stint; he played 23 matches, all as a starter, as the northern team finished sixth in the 2006–07 campaign and qualified to the UEFA Cup for the first time in their history.

In 2008, Mangualde joined S.C. Freamunde in the second division, moving to Cyprus with Doxa Katokopias FC after just one year.
