= Freixiosa =

- Civil parish
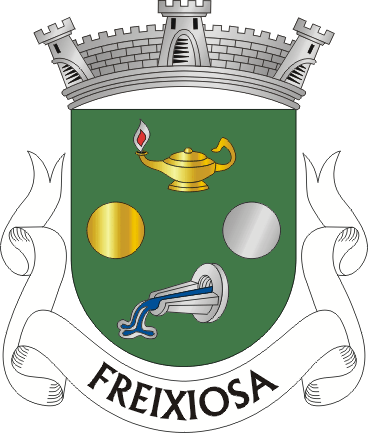
- Coat of arms

- Location in Portugal
- Coordinates: 40.609°N 7.682°W
- Country: Portugal
- Region: Centro
- Intermunic. comm.: Viseu Dão Lafões
- District: Viseu
- Municipality: Mangualde

Area
  - Total: 7.32 km^{2} (2.83 sq mi)

Population (2011)
  - Total: 257
  - Density: 35/km^{2} (91/sq mi)
- Time zone: UTC+00:00 (WET)
  - Summer (DST): UTC+01:00 (WEST)

Freixiosa is a freguesia in Mangualde, Portugal. The population in 2011 was 257, in an area of 7.32 km^{2}.
