= Casa de Mesquitela =

Residence of Mesquitela
- Casa de Mesquitela
- Interactive map of the Residence of Mesquitela area

General information
- Type: Residence
- Location: Mesquitela, Carrazeda de Ansiães, Portugal
- Coordinates: 40°35′6.38″N 7°45′13.46″W
- Opened: 16th century
- Owner: Portuguese Republic

Technical details
- Material: Granite

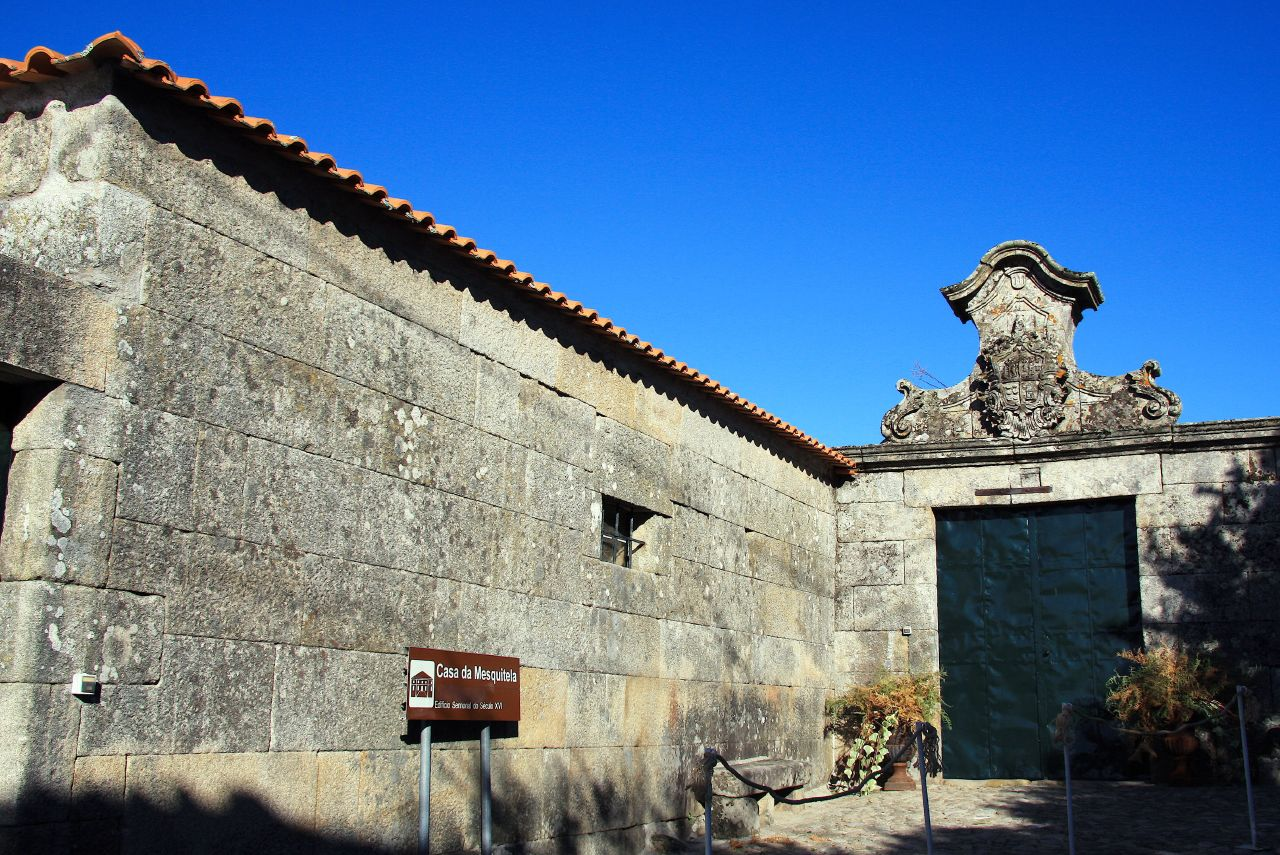
Casa da Mesquitela - Portugal (2980629891).jpg

The Residence of Mesquitela (Portuguese: Casa de Mesquitela), is a signeurial building typical of the Beira historical region, in the civil parish of Mesquitela, municipality of Mangualde.

== History ==
Its construction was started and/or completed between the end of the 16th century or beginning of the 17th century, although some suggest the 1500s.

By 1678, the house as associated with a Domingos do Amaral.

Alterations were made to the house with the inclusion of a formal chapel in 1722 (from an inscription on the door of the chapel). Sometime during the 18th century it became a headquarters for forces during the third Napoleonic invasion of Portugal.

Similarly, during the Liberal Wars Brigadier Manuel Cardoso de Faria Pinto, used this reside (where lived at that time) as base during the battles between absolutists and liberals.

On 2 January 1997, from a dispatch of the Ministry of Culture (Portuguese: Ministro da Cultura), the residence was classified as a Property of Public Interest (Portuguese: Imóvel de Interesse Público): since 1988, it had already been adapted as a tourist residence.

== Architecture ==
The residence is into the rural countryside of Mangualde, encircled by walls that divide several patios (with the exception of the western and eastern flanks).

Its horizontal plan is composed of a single floor, divided into various spaces and covered in tile roofing. Entrance into the building is made by large portico surmounted with a coat-of-arms framed in sectioned gables, over cornice. The coat-of-arms was sculpted in the 18th century, and belongs to the descendants of the Cardosos, Farias, Amarais and Coutos hereditary lines. The doorway gives access to the main courtyard and Couto de Homiziados (a frontier space that provided sanctuary from justice). This principal facade is surrounded by porch supported by cylindrical columns with rectangular base.

Doors around the house follow the lintel line, while the sash windows have granite frames, which are repeated all around the property. The rear facade, also with access to the interior, is preceded by five granite steps.

A chapel abuts the lateral facade of the residence, built in 1722 and dedicated to Santo António, with its main entrance topped by a niche with the image of the patron. To the right of this portico was originally a pulpit in rock, since removed.

The parcel's surrounding walls have several openings to access the patios.
