= Pardieiros =

Pardieiros is a Portuguese village located in the parish of Beijós, county Carregal do Sal, District of Viseu. The village has 406 inhabitants (2001). Its origins date back over two thousand years, as Beijós.

Pardieiros derives from hovel (shack), that is, a house in ruins or very old. It is located 18 km from the biggest city in the district Viseu, Pardieiros is a village in development, who lives essentially of agriculture, cattle breeding, trade and public transports (taxis). It is the highest in the county, with elevation of 320 m in the south and with 375 m in the center and north of the village. It has a school for 30 students, a kindergarten for 25 children and has four cafes. It has also a public association in the northeast of the village, with bar, restaurant, entertainment and conviviality. It has two football fields of 11, with benches for spectators. Currently (2010), the association has plans for construction which have been proposed to the parish. It has a church and a source of 1942, under the ground, very interesting and wonderful for visitors. It is a rural village surrounded by vineyards and forests of pines, oaks and gentle hills. It has a view on the River Dão and the hills.

In the neighboring of Pardieiros, there is a river beach (River Dão), a recently rebuilt village (Póvoa Dão) and relaxing spa, Sangemil, suitable for tourists visiting the village, which has surpassed the 20,000 tourists in the blog.

== Population/area ==
Pardieiros	Parish of Beijós	District of Viseu
329 (1993) 406 (2001)	1,217 (2001)	99,016 (2004) 108,912 (2009)
5,14 km²	12,60 km²	5,007 km²
