= Moimenta de Maceira Dão =

- Civil parish
- Location in Portugal
- Coordinates: 40°34′48″N 7°48′59″W
- Country: Portugal
- Region: Centro
- Intermunic. comm.: Viseu Dão Lafões
- District: Viseu
- Municipality: Mangualde
- Disbanded: 2013

Area
  - Total: 6.39 km^{2} (2.47 sq mi)

Population (2001)
  - Total: 664
  - Density: 100/km^{2} (270/sq mi)
- Time zone: UTC+00:00 (WET)
  - Summer (DST): UTC+01:00 (WEST)

Moimenta de Maceira Dão is a former civil parish in the municipality of Mangualde, Portugal. In 2013, the parish merged into the new parish Moimenta de Maceira Dão e Lobelhe do Mato.
