= Cunha Baixa =

- Civil parish
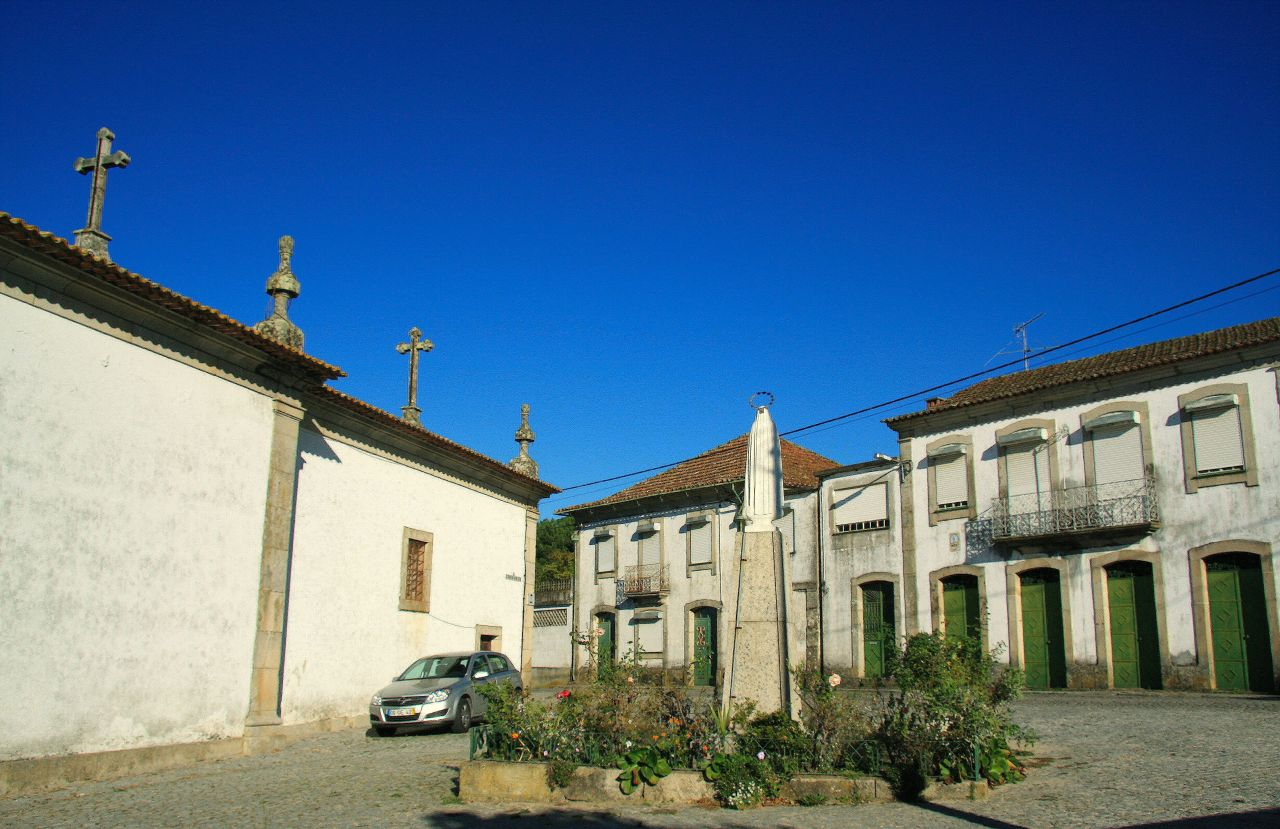

- Location in Portugal
- Coordinates: 40.570°N 7.756°W
- Country: Portugal
- Region: Centro
- Intermunic. comm.: Viseu Dão Lafões
- District: Viseu
- Municipality: Mangualde

Area
  - Total: 15.52 km^{2} (5.99 sq mi)

Population (2011)
  - Total: 884
  - Density: 57.0/km^{2} (148/sq mi)
- Time zone: UTC+00:00 (WET)
  - Summer (DST): UTC+01:00 (WEST)

Cunha Baixa is a freguesia in Mangualde, Portugal. The population in 2011 was 884, in an area of 15.52 km^{2}.
