= São Pedro do Sul, Portugal =

São Pedro do Sul
- Municipality
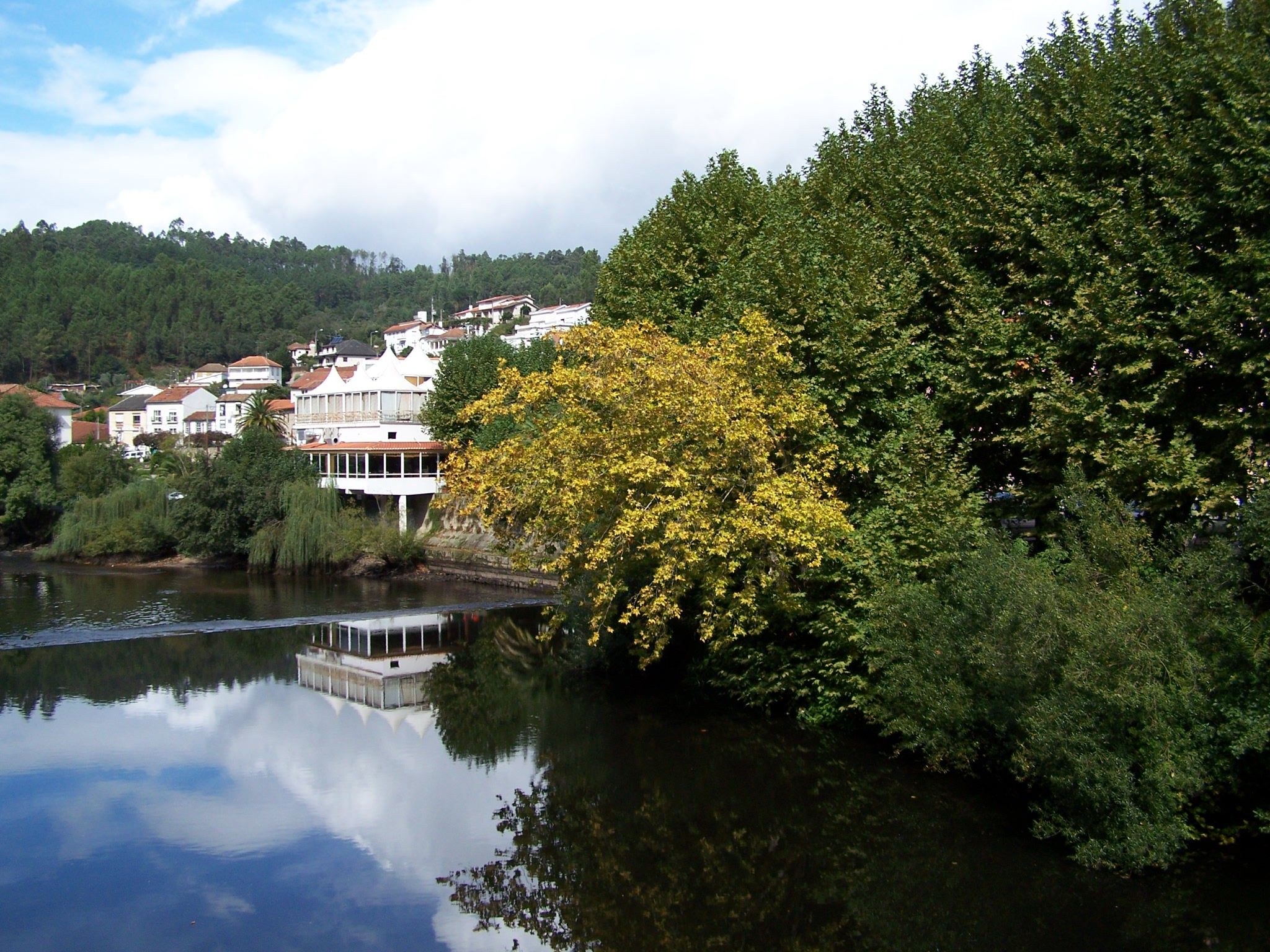
- View of São Pedro do Sul

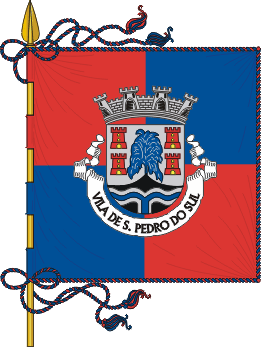
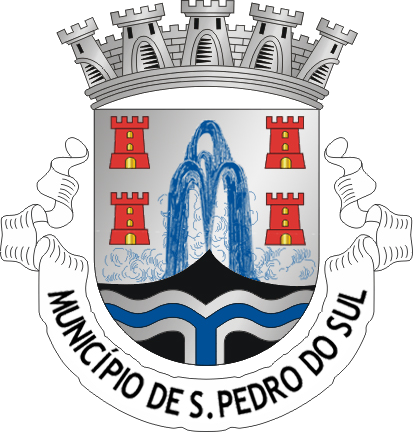
- Flag Coat of arms
- Interactive map of São Pedro do Sul
- Coordinates: 40°45′N 8°04′W
- Country: Portugal
- Region: Centro
- Intermunic. comm.: Viseu Dão Lafões
- District: Viseu
- Parishes: 14

Government
  - President: António Figueiredo (PSD)

Area
  - Total: 348.95 km^{2} (134.73 sq mi)

Population (2011)
  - Total: 16,851
  - Density: 48.291/km^{2} (125.07/sq mi)
- Time zone: UTC+00:00 (WET)
  - Summer (DST): UTC+01:00 (WEST)
- Local holiday: Saint Peter; June 29
- Website: https://www.cm-spsul.pt

São Pedro do Sul (Portuguese pronunciation: [sɐ̃w ˈpeðɾu ðu ˈsul]) is a municipality in the Central Portuguese district of Viseu. Part of the subregion of Dão-Lafões, the municipality has a population of 16,851 inhabitants and includes 14 civil parishes. The seat of this municipality is the city of São Pedro do Sul, with a population of 5,728 inhabitants.

== History ==
=== Pre-Roman ===
One of the oldest monuments of the region is the "Pedra Escrita" that is a written granitic megalith dated from 10th century BC.

In the region there are three known "Castros". The castro is a fortified village that began to be inhabited from the 6th century BC, lacking streets with right angles and characterised by construction which is almost always circular. One of the Castros in São Pedro do Sul is Castro da Cárcoda.

=== Roman Era ===
In the region there are several Roman bridges and Roman Thermal Spas.

=== Middle Ages ===
São Pedro do Sul was the southern border of the Kingdom of Portugal at the time of the foundation of the country, being the natural border of the river Vouga.

The first King of Portugal Afonso Henriques lived in São Pedro do Sul while healing his injuries after the Battle of Badajoz.

=== Early Modern ===
The municipality was created in 1836 when the municipality of Lafões was divided, forming São Pedro do Sul and Vouzela.

=== Late modern and contemporary ===
São Pedro do Sul was elevated to the status of city on 12 June 2009.

== Thermal Town ==
São Pedro do Sul is world famous for the thermal baths dating back to pre-Roman times.

== Geography ==
The municipality is located in the north, along the Castro valley (southeast of Viseu), bordered in the south by Vouzela, to the south and west by Oliveira de Frades (northern section), in the west by Vale de Cambra and in the northwest by Arouca.

São Pedro do Sul is a municipality in the valley of Lafões, framed by the massifs of the sierras of Arada, Gralheira and São Macário. These massifs with green landscapes and crystalline water courses, hide many settlements. From the peak of São Macário, at 1,054 metres (3,458 ft) altitude, there are the views of the mountain range of Montemuro, Estrela and Caramulo.

Population of the municipality of São Pedro do Sul (1849 – 2011)
1849	1900	1930	1960	1981	1991	2001	2011
13 844	22 051	23 426	24 273	21 220	19 985	19 083	16 851

The municipal holiday each year is on June 29.

== Notable people ==
- António Correia de Oliveira (1879-1960) a poet; nominated unsuccessfully 15 times for the Nobel Prize in Literature.
- Conceição Matos (born 1936) a Portuguese communist who campaigned against the Estado Novo regime in the 1960s. She was arrested and tortured.
- Carlos Carvalhas (born 1941) a Portuguese economist, politician and former Secretary-General of the Portuguese Communist Party, 1993–2004
