= Fornos de Maceira Dão =

- Civil parish
- Location in Portugal
- Coordinates: 40.604°N 7.821°W
- Country: Portugal
- Region: Centro
- Intermunic. comm.: Viseu Dão Lafões
- District: Viseu
- Municipality: Mangualde

Area
  - Total: 16.25 km^{2} (6.27 sq mi)

Population (2011)
  - Total: 1,459
  - Density: 90/km^{2} (230/sq mi)
- Time zone: UTC+00:00 (WET)
  - Summer (DST): UTC+01:00 (WEST)

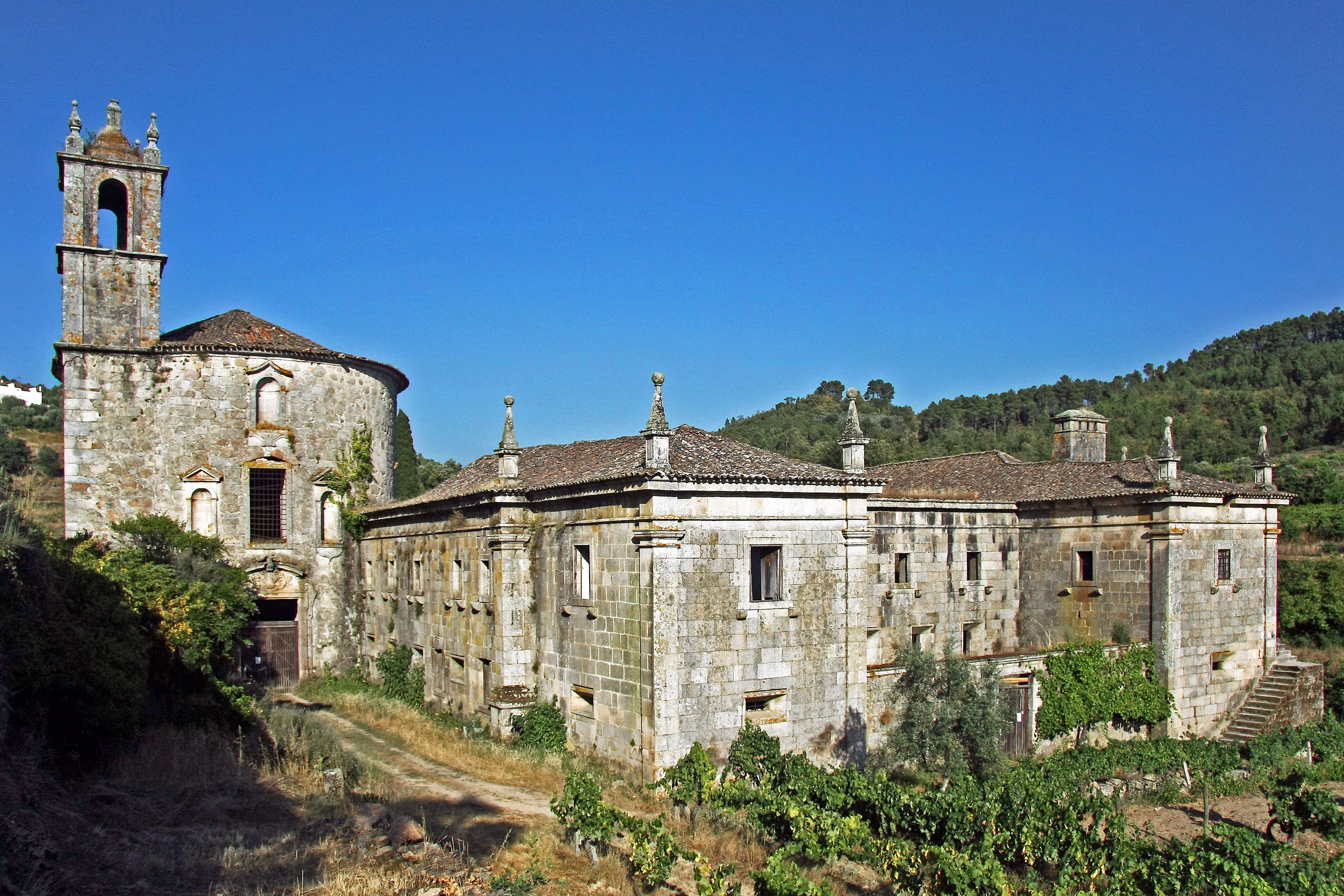

Fornos de Maceira Dão is a freguesia in Mangualde, Portugal. The population in 2011 was 1,459, in an area of 16.25 km^{2}.
