= Vila Nova de Paiva =

- Municipality
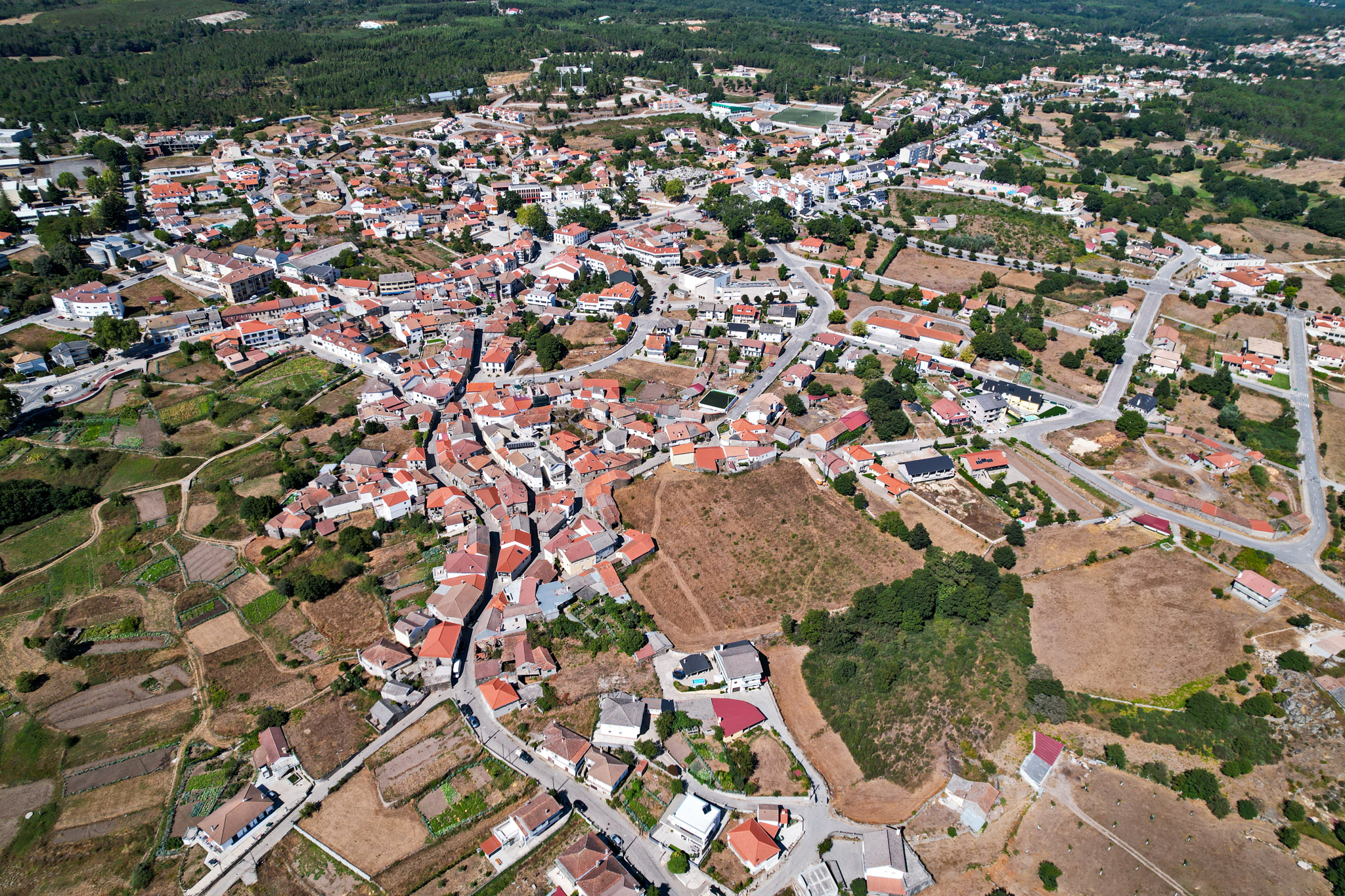
- Aerial view of Vila Nova de Paiva

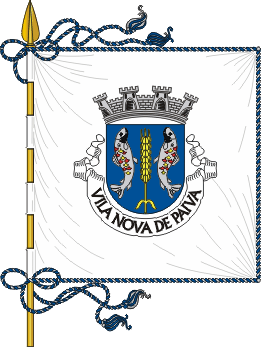
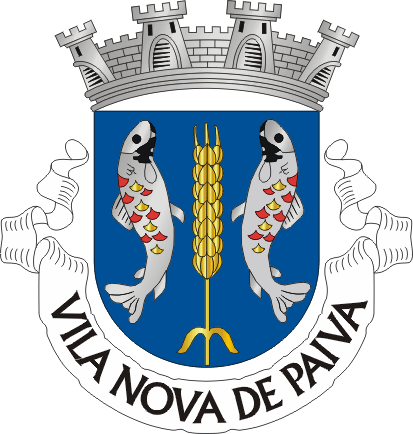
- Flag Coat of arms
- Interactive map of Vila Nova de Paiva
- Coordinates: 40°51′N 7°43′W
- Country: Portugal
- Region: Centro
- Intermunic. comm.: Viseu Dão Lafões
- District: Viseu
- Parishes: 5

Government
  - President: Manuel Custódio (PSD)

Area
  - Total: 175.53 km^{2} (67.77 sq mi)

Population (2011)
  - Total: 5,176
  - Density: 29.49/km^{2} (76.37/sq mi)
- Time zone: UTC+00:00 (WET)
  - Summer (DST): UTC+01:00 (WEST)
- Local holiday: March 2
- Website: cm-vnpaiva.pt

Vila Nova de Paiva (European Portuguese pronunciation: [ˈvilɐ ˈnɔvɐ ðɨ ˈpajvɐ]) is a municipality in the district Viseu in Portugal. The population in 2011 was 5,176, in an area of 175.53 km^{2}.

The present mayor is Manuel Marques Custódio, elected by the Social Democratic Party. The municipal holiday is March 2.

== Parishes ==
Administratively, the municipality is divided into 5 civil parishes (freguesias):

- Pendilhe
- Queiriga
- Touro
- Vila Cova à Coelheira
- Vila Nova de Paiva, Alhais e Fráguas

== Notable people ==
- Cláudio Ramos (born 1991 in Vila Nova de Paiva) a football goalkeeper for FC Porto; spent most of his career with Tondela with 267 club caps
