= Vinhas =

Vinhas is a surname. Notable people with the surname include:

- Lúcio Mauro Vinhas de Souza, Brazilian-Portuguese economist
- Rui Vinhas (born 1986), Portuguese cyclist
