= Passô =

Hamlet in Póvoa de Varzim, Portugal

Coordinates: 41.4188°N 8.7411°W

Passô is a hamlet in the combined civil parish of Aver-o-Mar, Amorim e Terroso, municipality of Póvoa de Varzim in northern Portugal. Passô had a population of 425 in 2011. Prior to the creation in 2013 of the merged parish, Passô was included within the civil parish of Terroso.
