= Tó, Portugal =

Tó
- Civil parish
- Location in Portugal
- Coordinates: 41°19′27″N 6°33′58″W
- Country: Portugal
- Region: Norte
- Intermunic. comm.: Terras de Trás-os-Montes
- District: Bragança
- Municipality: Mogadouro

Area
  - Total: 23.69 km^{2} (9.15 sq mi)

Population (2011)
  - Total: 154
  - Density: 6.5/km^{2} (17/sq mi)
- Time zone: UTC+00:00 (WET)
  - Summer (DST): UTC+01:00 (WEST)

Tó is a civil parish in the municipality of Mogadouro, Portugal, with 23.66 km² of surface and 154 inhabitants in the year 2011.

== Population ==
Population of the Tó parish
1864	1878	1890	1900	1911	1920	1930	1940	1950	1960	1970	1981	1991	2001	2011
458	473	431	494	499	409	377	429	514	535	340	349	264	209	154

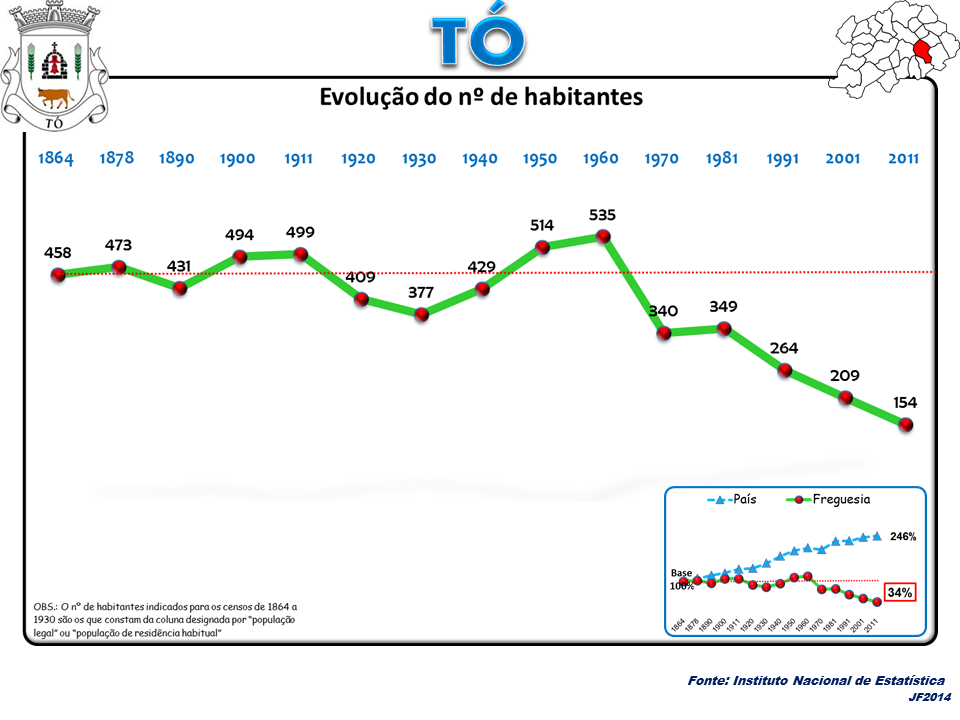
Evolution of the population of Tó 1864/2011

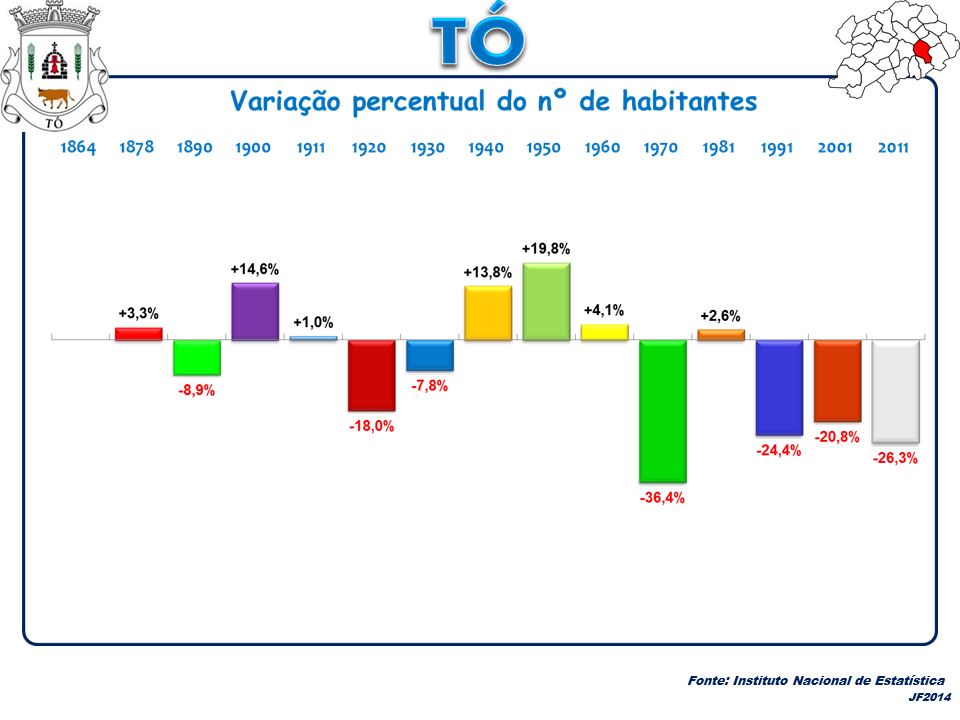
Variation of the population of Tó 1864/2011

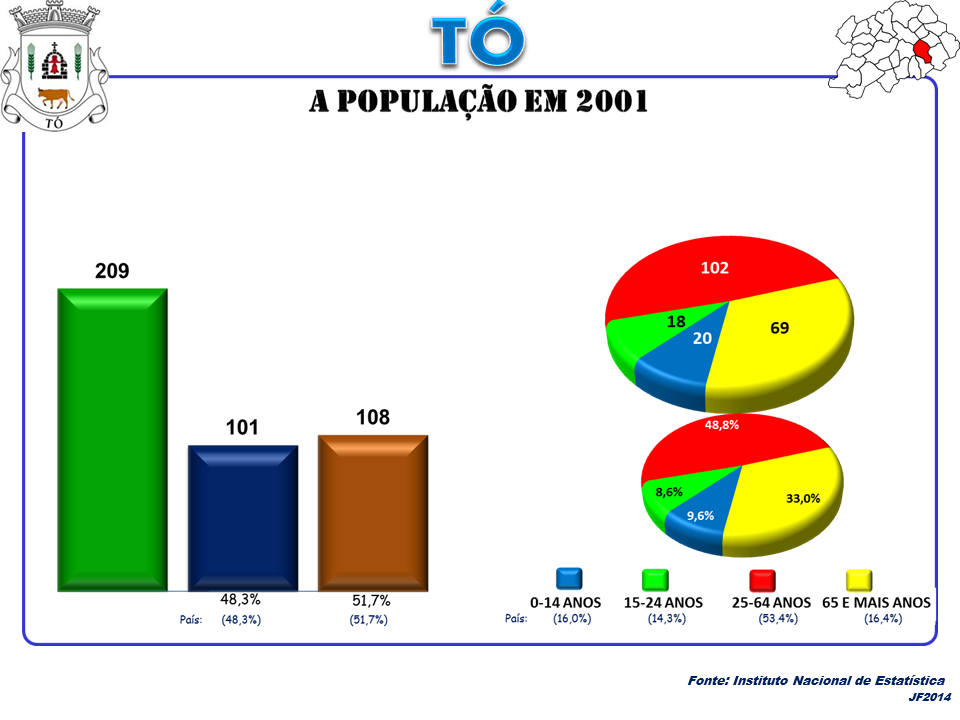
The population in 2001

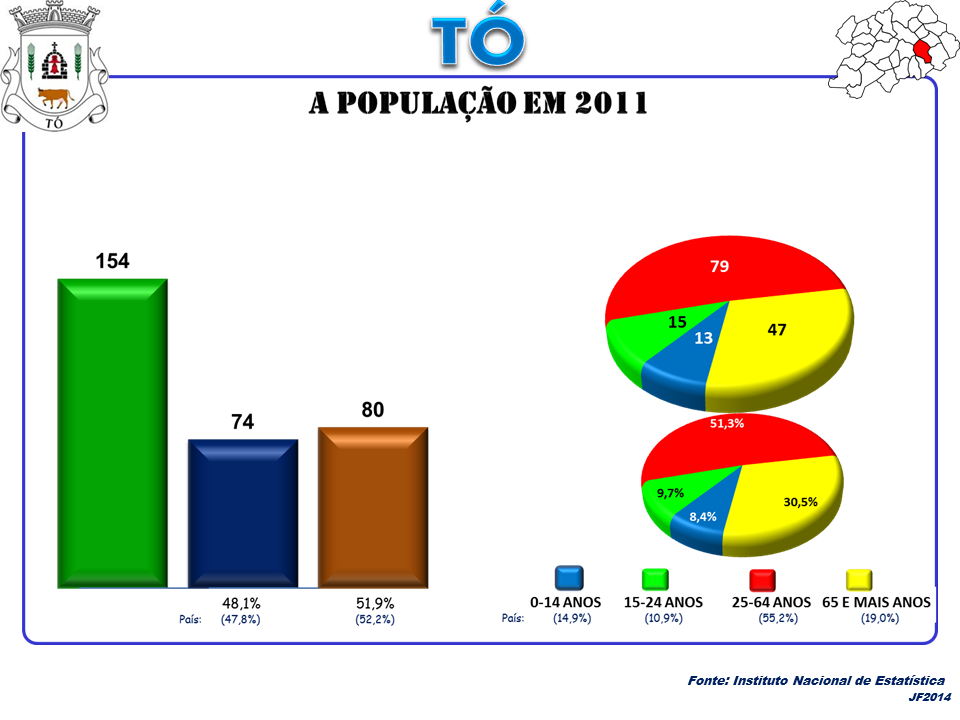
The population in 2011
