= Mountain hydrology =

Branch of hydrology studies

Mountain hydrology is the branch of hydrology that studies water-related processes in mountain environments, focusing on how mountains capture, store, and release water as snow and glaciers, influencing downstream water supply, ecosystems, and the risks of natural hazards like floods and droughts. This specialized field investigates the unique challenges presented by steep slopes, complex topography, and extreme climatological conditions, using methods such as remote sensing, field measurements, and numerical modeling to understand and predict water resource availability and hazard impacts in these critical "water tower" regions.
