= Dão-Lafões =

Portuguese subregion

Viseu Dão-Lafões
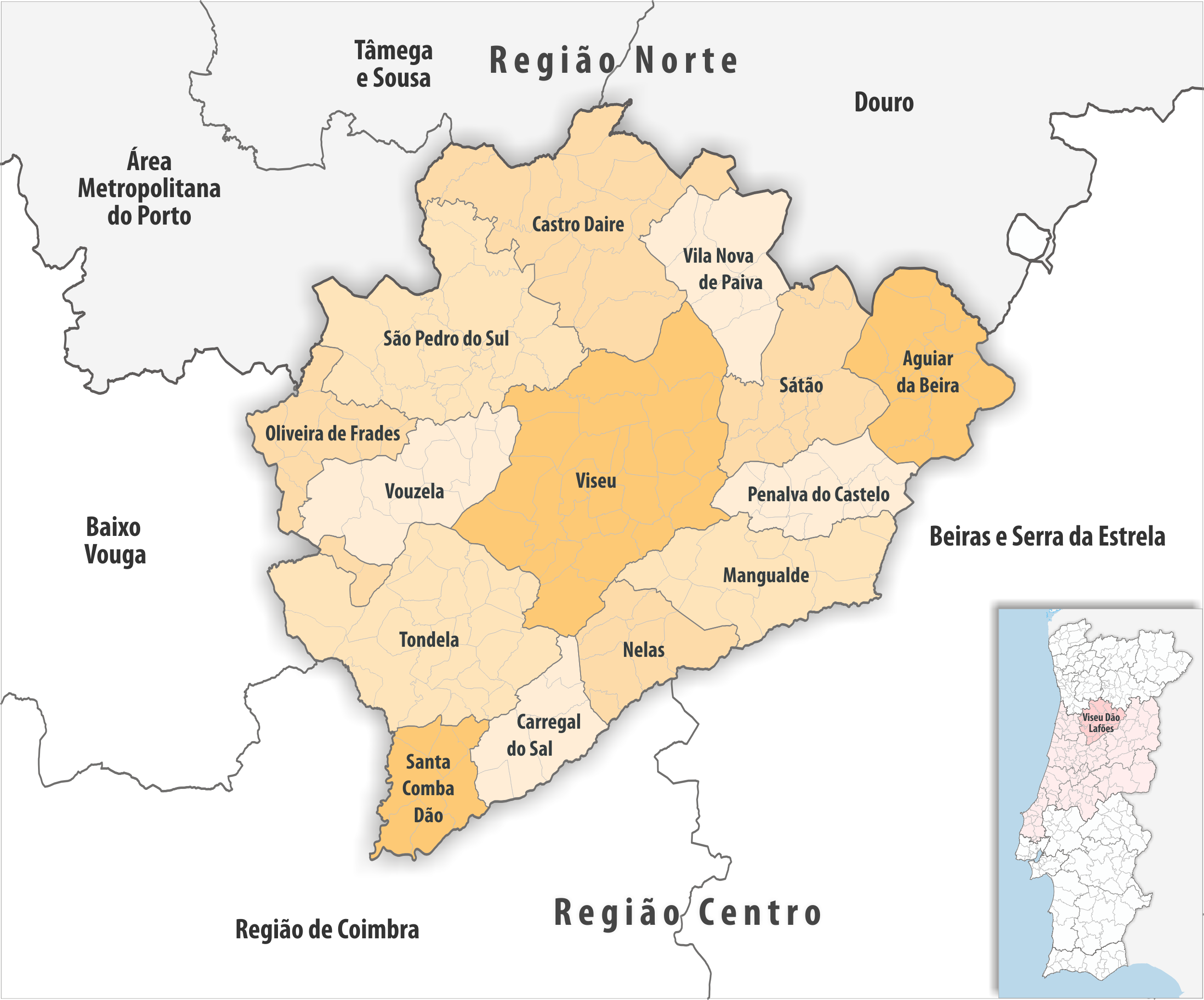
- Coordinates: 40°39′19″N 7°54′51″W
- Country: Portugal

Area
  - Total: 3,237 km^{2} (1,250 sq mi)

Population (2021)
  - Total: 252,984
  - Density: 78.15/km^{2} (202.4/sq mi)

Viseu Dão-Lafões is a Portuguese subregion located in the north of the Central Region. In 2021, the subregion recorded 252,984 inhabitants and a population density of 78 inhabitants per km^{2}. The subregion has an area of 3,238 km2, which can be divided into 14 municipalities and 156 parishes. The capital of the subregion is the city of Viseu, which is the largest city in the subregion and the third largest city in the Central Region, with 99,561 inhabitants in the entire municipality and 59,469 inhabitants in the urban area. It borders the Porto metropolitan area to the northwest, the Tâmega e Sousa subregion to the north, the Douro subregion to the northeast, the Beiras e Serra da Estrela subregion to the east, the Região de Coimbra subregion to the south and the Região de Aveiro subregion to the west.

== Municipalities ==
The subregion consists of the following 14 municipalities:

- Aguiar da Beira
- Carregal do Sal
- Castro Daire
- Mangualde
- Nelas
- Oliveira de Frades
- Penalva do Castelo
- Santa Comba Dão
- São Pedro do Sul
- Sátão
- Tondela
- Vila Nova de Paiva
- Viseu
- Vouzela

== Demographics ==
=== Inhabitants ===
The 2021 census shows that in the subregion the population has decreased to 252,796, compared to the year 2011, where the population was 267,728 and in 2001, where the population was 275,934. Castro Daire and Viseu are the only ones of the 14 municipalities that registered an increase, while the other 12 municipalities registered a decrease.

| Municipality | Inhabitants | | | Area in km^{2} | Population density per km^{2} |
| Municipality | 2001 | 2011 | 2021 | Area in km^{2} | Population density per km^{2} |
|---|---|---|---|---|---|
| Aguiar da Beira | 6,247 | 5,473 | 5,231 | 206.7 km^{2} | 25 |
| Carregal do Sal | 10,411 | 9,835 | 9,038 | 116.8 km^{2} | 77 |
| Castro Daire | 16,990 | 15,339 | 13,736 | 379.0 km^{2} | 36 |
| Mangualde | 20,990 | 19,880 | 18,303 | 219.2 km^{2} | 83 |
| Nelas | 14,283 | 14,037 | 13,124 | 125.7 km^{2} | 104 |
| Oliveira de Frades | 10,584 | 10,261 | 9,510 | 147.4 km^{2} | 64 |
| Penalva do Castelo | 9,019 | 7,956 | 7,333 | 134.3 km^{2} | 54 |
| Santa Comba Dão | 12,473 | 11,597 | 10,641 | 111.9 km^{2} | 95 |
| São Pedro do Sul | 19,083 | 16,851 | 15,137 | 348.9 km^{2} | 43 |
| Sátão | 13,144 | 12,444 | 11,026 | 201.9 km^{2} | 54 |
| Tondela | 31,152 | 28,946 | 25,914 | 371.2 km^{2} | 69 |
| Vila Nova de Paia | 6,141 | 5,176 | 4,662 | 175.5 km^{2} | 26 |
| Viseu | 93,501 | 99,369 | 99,561 | 507.1 km^{2} | 196 |
| Vouzela | 11,916 | 10,564 | 9,580 | 193.6 km^{2} | 49 |
| Viseu-Dão Lafões | 275,934 | 267,728 | 252,796 | 3,238 km^{2} | 78 |
