= Mangualde =

- Municipality
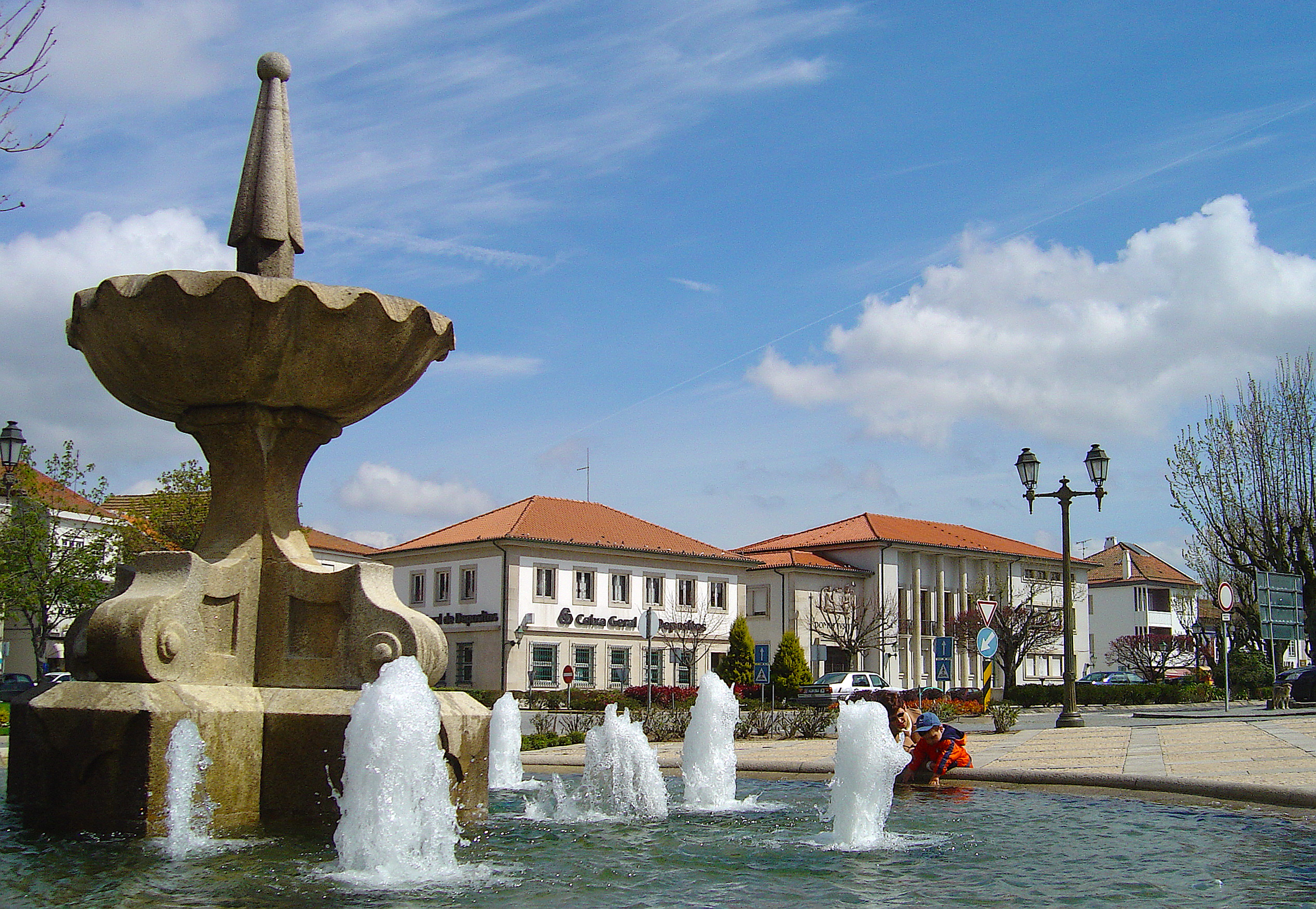
- The main square in Mangualde, Largo Dr. Couto, location of the municipal authority

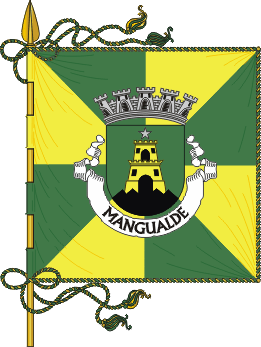
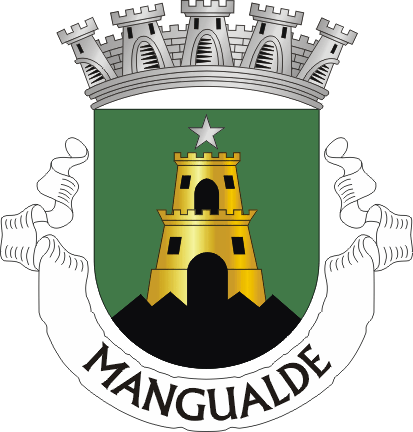
- Flag Coat of arms
- Interactive map of Mangualde
- Location in Portugal
- Coordinates: 40°36′15″N 7°45′40″W
- Country: Portugal
- Region: Centro
- Intermunic. comm.: Viseu Dão Lafões
- District: Viseu
- Parishes: 12

Government
  - President: Marco Almeida (PS)

Area
  - Total: 219.26 km^{2} (84.66 sq mi)
- Elevation: 535 m (1,755 ft)

Population (2021)
  - Total: 18,303
  - Density: 83.476/km^{2} (216.20/sq mi)
- Time zone: UTC+00:00 (WET)
  - Summer (DST): UTC+01:00 (WEST)
- Postal code: 3534
- Area code: 232
- Website: www.cmmangualde.pt

Mangualde (European Portuguese pronunciation: [mɐ̃ˈɡwaldɨ]) is a municipality in the subregion of Dão-Lafões (historical Beira Interior), central region of Portugal. The population in 2011 was 19,880, in an area of 219.26 km^{2}.

== History ==
The region of Mangualde has been a crossroads of many peoples: Viriathus's warriors, transhumance shepherds, Romans, Moors and Christian conquerors, including soldiers from Castile or France, or even pilgrims. Mangualde was an important outpost in the textile trade from Covilhã, Seia and Gouveia. Its location, on the frontier with the Serra da Estrela and marginalized by its geography to north, was nonetheless a channel of pre-historic cultures associated with the dolmens that are found through the region. The mount of Nossa Senhora do Castelo, is one such example of the pre-Romanic castros that were used by the early settlers, then reappropriated by the Roman soldiers as forts.

The Romans, attracted by the riches of the Iberian Peninsula (primarily minerals), began to progressively occupy the region until the 5th century, when barbarians invaded the peninsula. Romanization of these lands resulted in a diffusion and assimilation of cultural structures, political hierarchies, social institutions, the economy and religious services. Mangualde was one of the principal access-ways in Lusitânia, connecting Emerita Augusta (Mérida) to Bracara Augusta (Braga). Along the roadway, millennium or road markers were discovered in Abrunhosa-a-Velha, noting the repairs completed to the road under emperors Hadrian and Numerian. Similarly, a second via crossed the Alcafache bridge (a Roman-built structure) towards Espinho, while another crossed the rivers from the north.

After the barbarian invasions, the region was also taken by Muslim forces, who occupied the area of Nossa Senhora do Castelo. This place became known by the military governor, Zurara, and the fort constructed on the site referred to as Castelo de Zurara (or also Castelo de Azurara), over time becoming transliterated in ancient name of the municipality: Azurara da Beira. In 1058, the medieval castle was conquered from the Moors, by the forces of Ferdinand I of León and Castile. By 1102, Count Henrique and Countess Theresa, before the independence of Portugal, issued a foral to the lands of Zurara, between the Dão and Mondego Rivers. It was later confirmed by Afonso II, when the monarch issued his ordinances in February 1217, and by King Manuel in 1514, during his reforms. When Christian forces finally took the fortress, they discovered a privileged lookout that provided line-of-sight for thousands of miles.

During the Middle Ages, the town of Mangualde grew from two distinct poles: the first was designated Cabo da Vila and the other Rossio.

With time, even the population of Rossio began to develop into another distinct neighborhood. Around this time (the middle of the 17th century) the new space was nothing more than some modest dwellings occupied by locals.

After the 17th century, with the creation of the Misericórdia by Philip II, the institution of "outside" judges by King John IV (1655), Mangualde experienced a period of great expansion.

In the 19th century, residential growth was significant, helped on by the construction of a new highway towards Guarda, which contributed to this development. Over time, the two original poles merged (in the 20th century), and Rossio took on a greater role: many of the social and economic functions of Mangualde concentrated in Rossio, including public services, banking, commercial shops and cafes.

On 3 July 1986, the Portuguese Assembly ratified the elevation of the town to the category of city.

== Geography ==
Mangualde is dominated by a plateau/table sloping to the south, cut by tributaries of the Dão and Mondego Rivers: the municipality is crossed in the north by the Dão River defining its northern frontier, while its southern border is limited by the Mondego. In addition to these rivers, Mangualde is crossed by a series of gently-flowing ravines and rivers, such as the Ribeira de Frades, Ribeira do Castelo and the Ribeira de Videira, in the western extend of the municipality. The Fagilde reservoir is the largest extension of these limits, and supports the community to the north of Mangualde.

Along the valleys there are many fertile alluvial lands, of which, the more fertile parcels are located in the central part of the municipality, around the civil parishes of Mangualde, Fornos de Maceira Dão, Espinho and Alcafache.

Geomorphologically, Mangualde is part of the Maciço Antigo (Old Massif), dating to the Paleozoic. It was affected by a period of prolonged erosion, that was later rejuvenated by upheaval associated with mountain-building. Most of the area is composed of granite, and mitigated by mountain hydrology. A small group of mountains along the east, the Serra do Bom Successo, extend to Guimarães de Tavares. In addition, other mountainous areas include the Serras de Abrunhosa-a-Velha, Cunha Alta and Almeidinha which link to the Serra da Senhora do Castelo. Disperse and running along lower elevations, the topography is highlighted by the higher elevations in Tabosa, Roda an Fagilde.

=== Climate ===
The climate is Mediterranean, influenced by continental systems, resulting in cold winters and warm, dry summers.

=== Human geography ===
Population of the municipality of Mangualde (1801 - 2021)
Year	Pop.	±%
1801	10,216	—
1849	12,345	+20.8%
1900	22,340	+81.0%
1930	23,225	+4.0%
1960	23,311	+0.4%
1981	21,438	−8.0%
1991	21,808	+1.7%
2001	20,990	−3.8%
2011	19,880	−5.3%
2021	18,303	−7.9%

Located 15 kilometres from the district seat of Viseu, the municipality of Mangualde is surrounded by Penalva do Castelo (to the north), Viseu (to the west), Nelas, Seia and Gouveia (to the south) and Fornos de Algodres (to the east).

Civil parishes of Mangualde.

Administratively, the municipality is divided into 12 civil parishes (freguesias):

- Abrunhosa-a-Velha
- Alcafache
- Cunha Baixa
- Espinho
- Fornos de Maceira Dão
- Freixiosa
- Mangualde, Mesquitela e Cunha Alta
- Moimenta de Maceira Dão e Lobelhe do Mato
- Quintela de Azurara
- Santiago de Cassurrães e Póvoa de Cervães
- São João da Fresta
- Tavares (Chãs, Várzea e Travanca)

== Economy ==
Stellantis has a plant in Mangualde founded in 1962 by Citroën which began operations in 1964. Light industry in metallurgy, textiles, timber, stone and construction are also found in the municipality. Agriculture, including blueberry production, forestry and animal production, specially sheep and poultry, are other important economic activities in Mangualde Municipality.

== Architecture ==
=== Archaeology ===
- Castro of Bom Sucesso (Portuguese: Castro do Bom Sucesso)
- Dolmen of Cunha Baixa (Portuguese: Anta de Cunha Baixa)

=== Civic ===
- Citânia de Raposeira
- Fountain of Ricardina (Portuguese: Fonte de Ricardina)
- Palace of the Counts of Anadia (Portuguese: Palácio dos Condes de Anadia)
- Pillory of Abrunhosa-a-Velha (Portuguese: Pelourinho de Abrunhosa-a-Velha)
- Pillory of Chãs de Tavares (Portuguese: Pelourinho de Chãs de Tavares)
- Old Clock-tower (Portuguese: Torre do Relógio Velho)

=== Religious ===
- Chapel of Nossa Senhora de Cervães (Portuguese: Capela de Nossa Senhora de Cervães)
- Church of São Julião (Portuguese: Igreja Matriz de São Julião)
- Church of the Misericórdia (Portuguese: Igreja da Misericórdia de Mangualde)
- Hermitage of Nossa Senhora do Castelo (Portuguese: Ermida de Nossa Senhora do Castelo)
- Monastery of Santa Maria de Maceira Dão (Portuguese: Real Mosteiro de Santa Maria de Maceira Dão)

== Notable people ==
- Ana de Castro Osório (1872–1935) a feminist, active in the field of children's literature and political Republicanism.
- Bruno Albuquerque (born 1989 in Quintela de Azurara) a middle- and long-distance runner.
- Carlos Amaral Ferreira (born 1966), paralympic athlete.
- Elza Pais (born 1958) a sociology academic and politician.
- Filipa Rodrigues (born 1993) a footballer, 13 caps with the Portugal women's national football team.
- Jorge Coelho (1954-2021) a businessman, politician and former minister.
- João Azevedo (Portuguese politician) (born 1974) former Mayor and MP for Viseu.
- João Ferreira de Almeida (1628–1691), translator of the Bible into Portuguese.
- Pedro Álvares Cabral (c. 1467 or 1468 – c. 1520), Captain Navigator who discovered the Lands of Vera Cruz, Brazil, was Chief Mayor of the lands of the Municipality of Azurara da Beira, Mangualde.
- Ricardo Jorge Marques Duarte (born 1982), known as Mangualde, a retired footballer with 253 club caps.
- Vanda Maria Ribeiro Furtado Tavares de Vasconcelos (born 1962), known as Lio, a Portuguese-Belgian singer and actress.
