= Viseu Dão Lafões =

- Intermunicipal community
- Logo
- Interactive map of Viseu Dão Lafões
- Location in Portugal
- Coordinates: 40.65°N 7.91°W
- Country: Portugal
- Region: Centre
- Seat: Viseu
- Municipalities: 14

Area
  - Total: 3,237.74 km^{2} (1,250.10 sq mi)

Population (2011)
  - Total: 267,633
  - Density: 82.6604/km^{2} (214.090/sq mi)
- Time zone: UTC+00:00 (WET)
  - Summer (DST): UTC+01:00 (WEST)
- Website: cimvdl.pt

The Comunidade Intermunicipal Viseu Dão Lafões (Portuguese pronunciation: [viˈzew ðɐ̃w lɐˈfõjʃ]) is an administrative division in Portugal. It replaced the previously existing Greater Metropolitan Area of Viseu. Since January 2015, Viseu Dão Lafões is also a NUTS3 subregion of Centro Region, that covers the same area as the intermunicipal community. The main city and seat of the intermunicipal community is Viseu. The population in 2011 was 267,633, in an area of 3,237.74 km².

== Municipalities ==
The intermunicipal community Viseu Dão Lafões consists of 14 municipalities:

Municipality	Population (2011)	Area (km^{2})
Aguiar da Beira	5,473	206.77
Carregal do Sal	9,835	116.89
Castro Daire	15,339	379.04
Mangualde	19,880	219.26
Nelas	14,037	125.71
Oliveira de Frades	10,261	145.35
Penalva do Castelo	7,956	134.34
Santa Comba Dão	11,597	111.95
São Pedro do Sul	16,851	348.95
Sátão	12,444	201.94
Tondela	28,946	371.22
Vila Nova de Paiva	5,176	175.53
Viseu	99,274	507.10
Vouzela	10,564	193.69
Total	267,633	3,237.74
