= Viseu District =

District of Portugal

Coordinates: 40°39′25″N 7°54′50″W

District of Viseu Distrito de Viseu (Portuguese)
- District
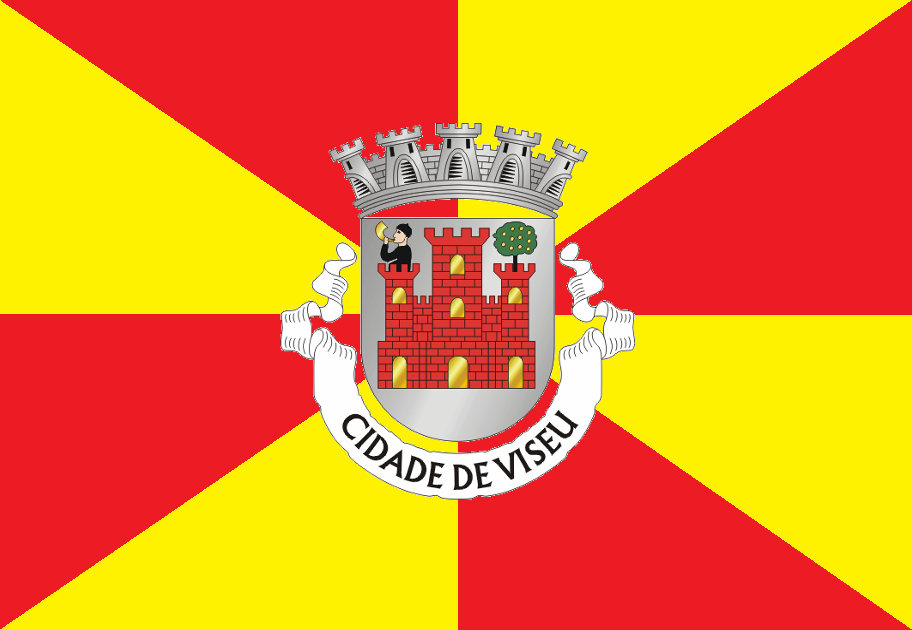
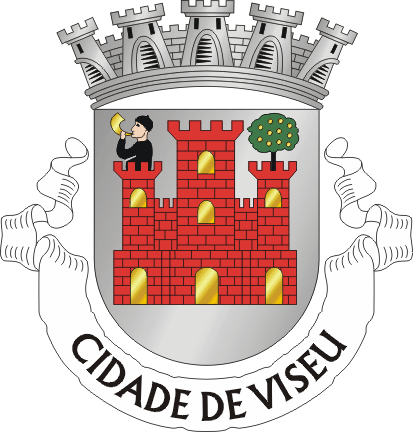
- Flag Coat of arms

- Country: Portugal
- Region: Centro and Norte
- Historical province: Beira Alta (partly Douro Litoral)
- No. of municipalities: 24
- No. of parishes: 282
- Capital: Viseu

Area
  - Total: 5,007 km^{2} (1,933 sq mi)

Population
  - Total: 394,927
  - Density: 78.87/km^{2} (204.3/sq mi)
- ISO 3166 code: PT-18
- No. of parliamentary representatives: 8

The District of Viseu (Portuguese: Distrito de Viseu [viˈzew]) is located in the Central Inland of Portugal. It is the only Portuguese district without a border with Spain or a coastline. Its capital is the city of Viseu.

== Municipalities ==
The district is composed by 24 municipalities:

- Armamar
- Carregal do Sal
- Castro Daire
- Cinfães
- Lamego
- Mangualde
- Moimenta da Beira
- Mortágua
- Nelas
- Oliveira de Frades
- Penalva do Castelo
- Penedono
- Resende
- Santa Comba Dão
- São João da Pesqueira
- São Pedro do Sul
- Sátão
- Sernancelhe
- Tabuaço
- Tarouca
- Tondela
- Vila Nova de Paiva
- Viseu
- Vouzela

== List of Parliamentary Representatives ==
Member	Party
António Lima Costa	PSD
Carla Borges	PSD
Fernando Ruas	PSD
João Azevedo	PS
José Rui Cruz	PS
Lúcia Araújo Silva	PS
Maria da Graça Reis	PS
Pedro Alves	PSD

== Summary of votes and seats won 1976-2022 ==
Summary of election results from Viseu district, 1976-2022
Parties	%	S	%	S	%	S	%	S	%	S	%	S	%	S	%	S	%	S	%	S	%	S	%	S	%	S	%	S	%	S	%	S
Parties	1976		1979		1980		1983		1985		1987		1991		1995		1999		2002		2005		2009		2011		2015		2019		2022	
PS	23.0	3	21.4	2	20.9	2	30.9	4	20.0	2	17.9	2	19.4	2	38.4	4	38.1	4	31.1	3	40.4	4	34.7	4	26.7	3	29.7	3	35.4	4	41.5	4
PSD	32.2	4	In AD				36.6	4	37.7	5	64.1	8	64.3	7	44.3	4	44.3	4	52.1	5	40.2	4	37.5	4	48.4	5	In PàF		36.2	4	36.8	4
CDS-PP	31.2	4	In AD				20.7	2	19.9	2	7.0		6.3		11.5	1	10.5	1	10.6	1	8.6	1	13.4	1	12.4	1	In PàF		5.9		2.1	
AD			64.1	8	66.8	8																										
PRD									10.9	1	1.7	0																				
PàF																											51.1	6				
Total seats	11		10										9																8			
Source: Comissão Nacional de Eleições

== See also ==
- Villages in the district of Viseu
  - Roda
  - Pardieiros
  - Urgeiriça
