= Paderne =

Paderne may refer to:

In Portugal
- Paderne, Albufeira, a parish in the municipality of Albufeira
- Paderne (Melgaço), a Portuguese parish, located in the municipality of Melgaço
- Castle of Paderne, a 12th-century fortification located in the civil parish of Paderne, municipality of Albufeira, in the Portuguese Algarve.
- Church of São Salvador de Paderne, a Portuguese church in Paderne, Melgaço, the northernmost municipality in Portugal.

In Spain
- Paderne, A Coruña, a municipality in the province of A Coruña, Galicia
- Paderne de Allariz, a municipality in the province of Ourense, Galicia
