= Thermal Spa of Peso =

- Thermas do Peso
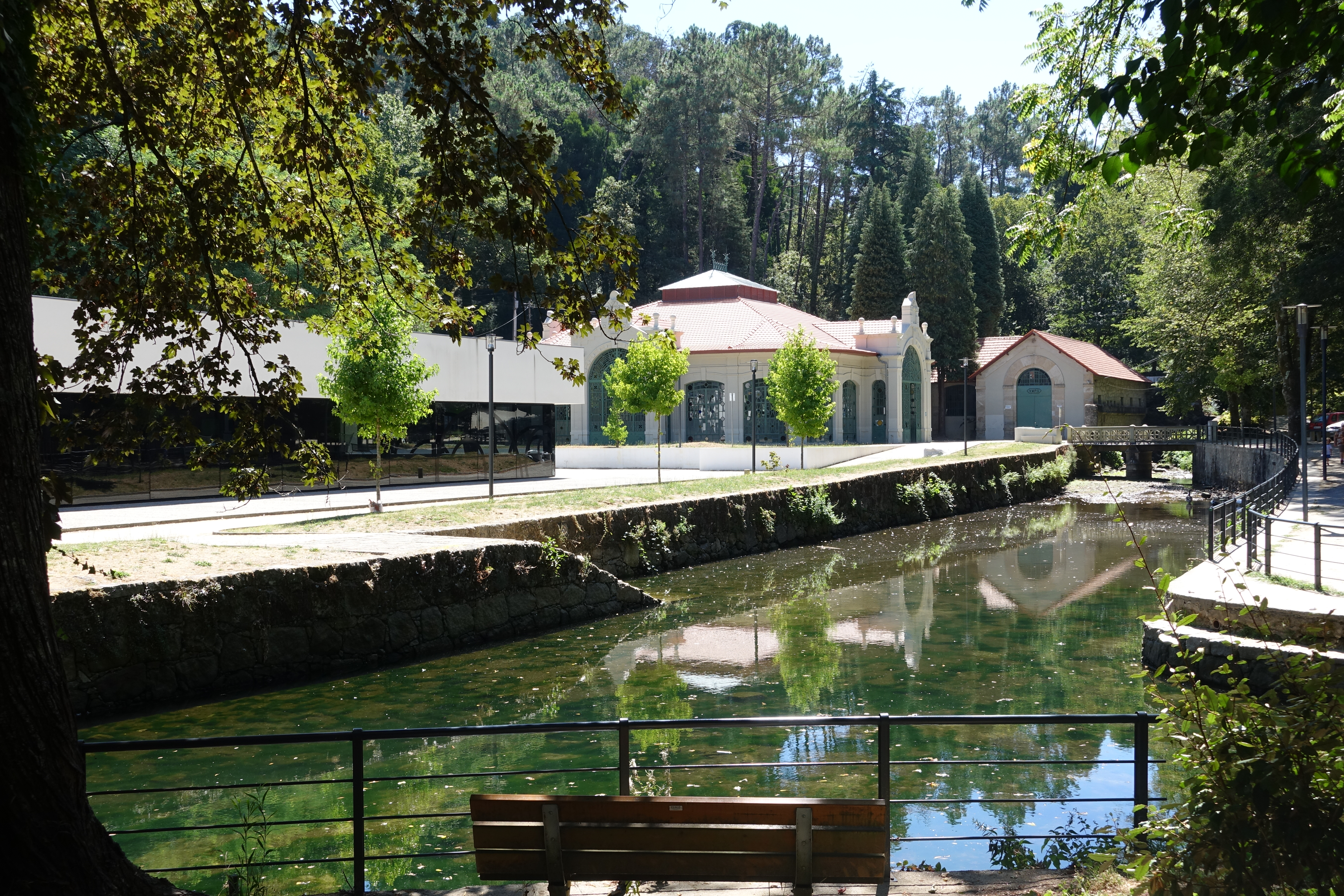
- The main buildings of the thermal spa park: the changing areas, main pavilion and utilities buildings, crossed by the Ribeira da Folia
- Interactive map of the Thermal Spa of Peso area

General information
- Type: Thermal Spa
- Architectural style: Baroque
- Location: Paderne, Melgaço, Portugal
- Coordinates: 42°6′21.3″N 8°16′54.9″W
- Owner: Portuguese Republic

Technical details
- Material: Granite

Design and construction
- Architect: Jacinto de Matos

The Thermal Spa of Peso (Portuguese: Thermas do Peso) is a 19th-century thermal spa in the civil parish of Paderne, municipality of Melgaço, in northern Portugal. Its thermal waters are recognized for their therapeutic properties to treat diabetes, digestive problems, respiratory ailments and the osteoarticular system, attracting many visitors in the 19th and 20th centuries.

== History ==
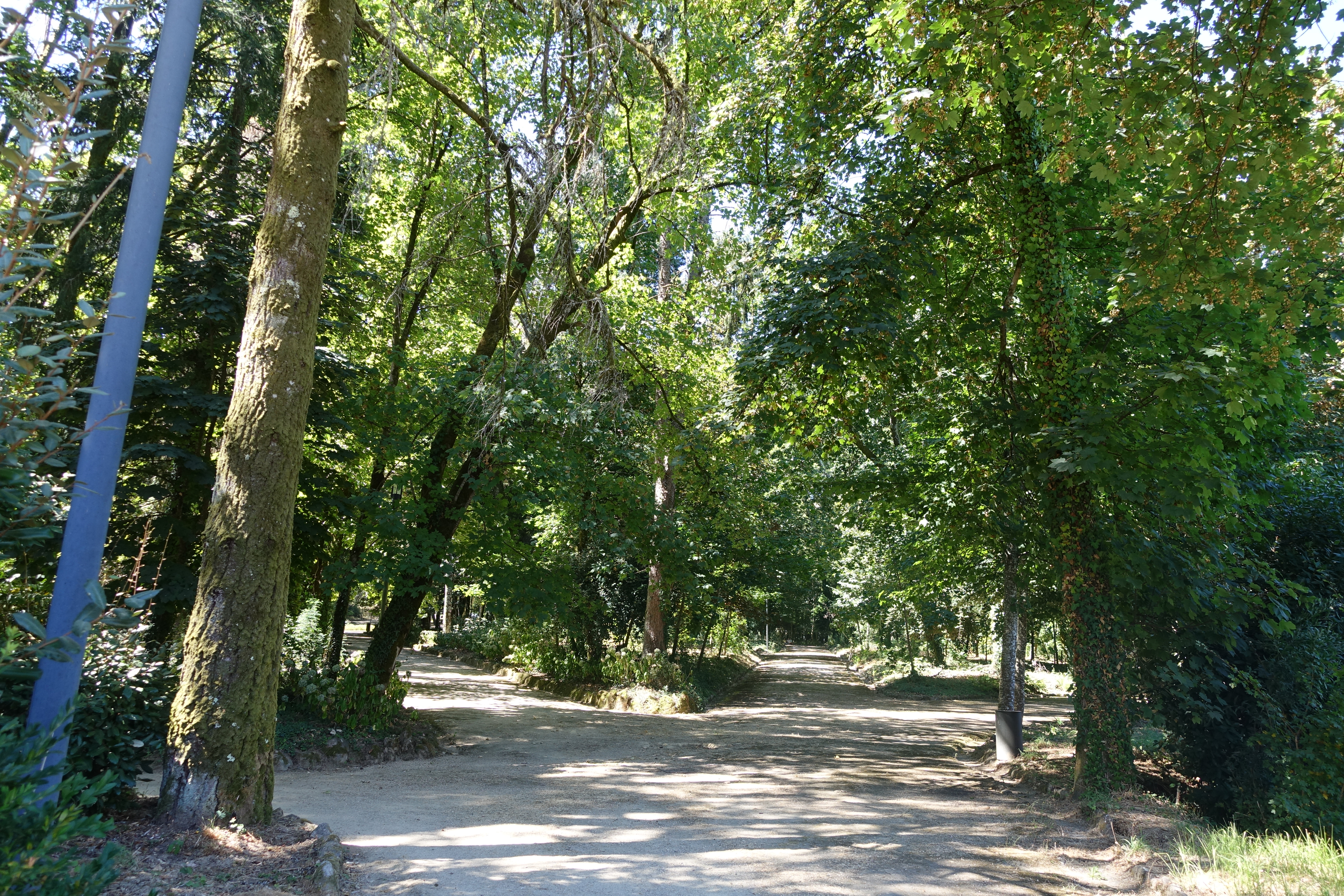
A number of paths bisect the main avenue within the park.

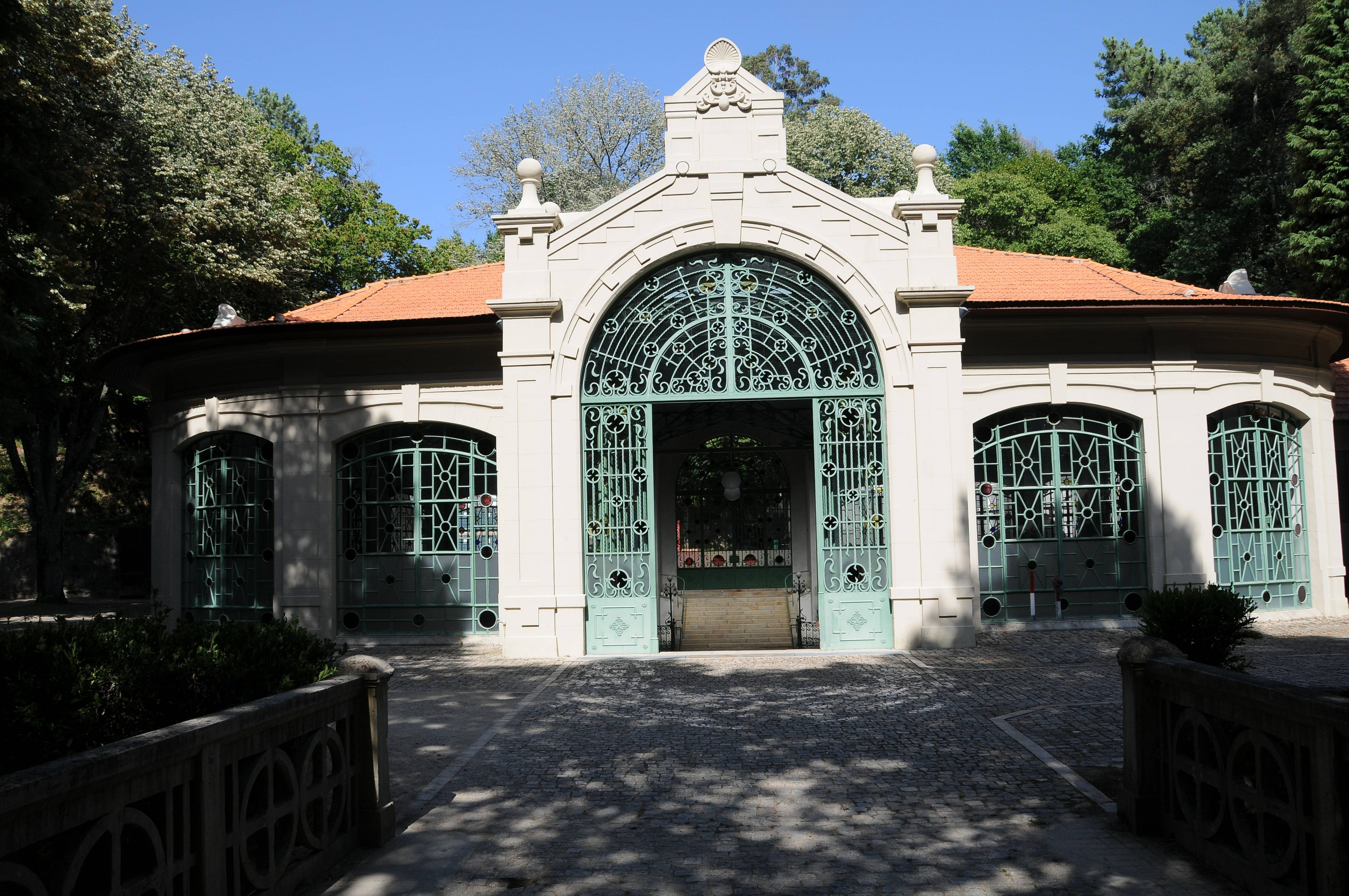
Principal view of the 19th-century thermal spring pavilion of the park

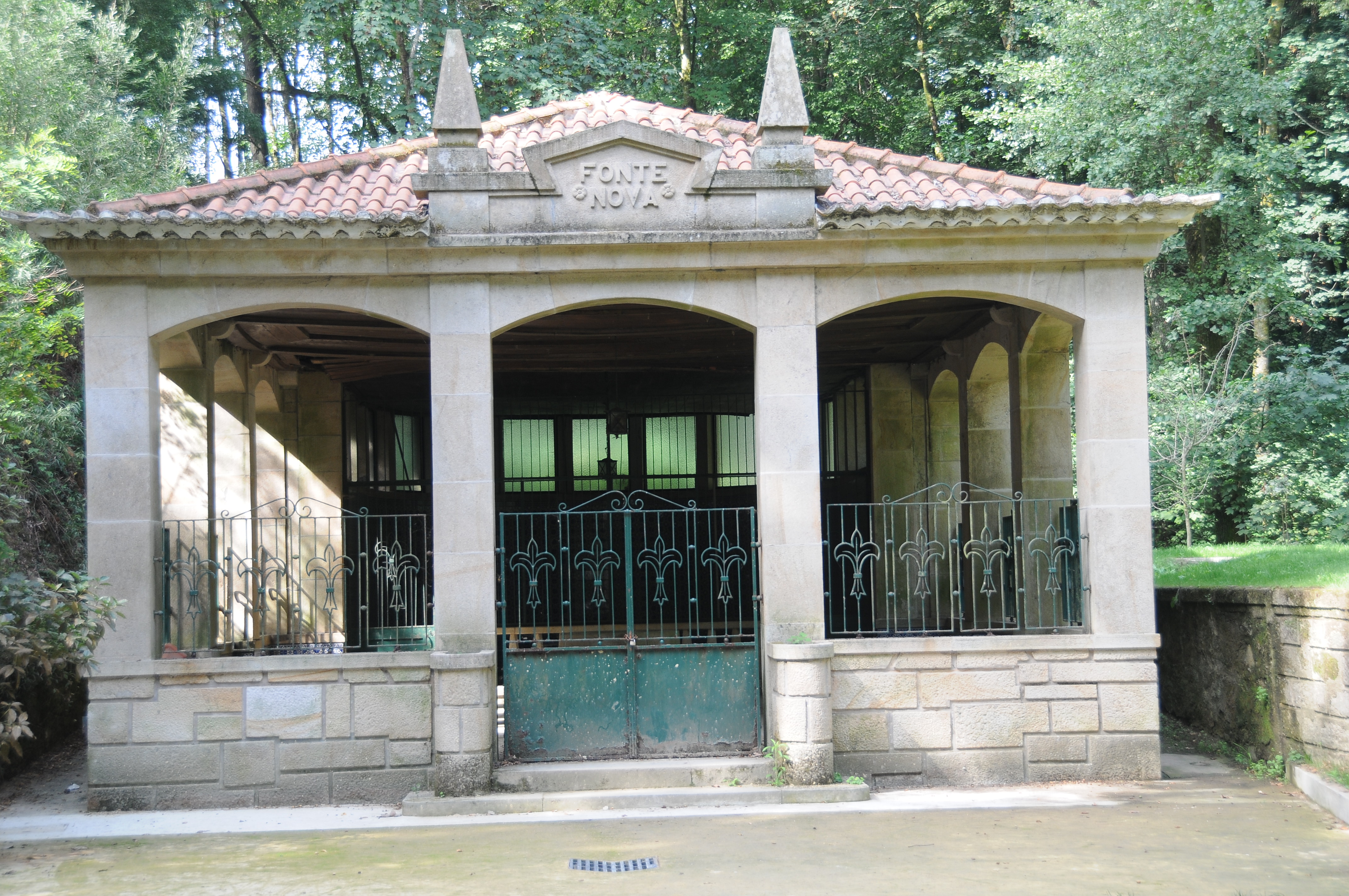
The 19th century Fonte Novo fountain building onsite

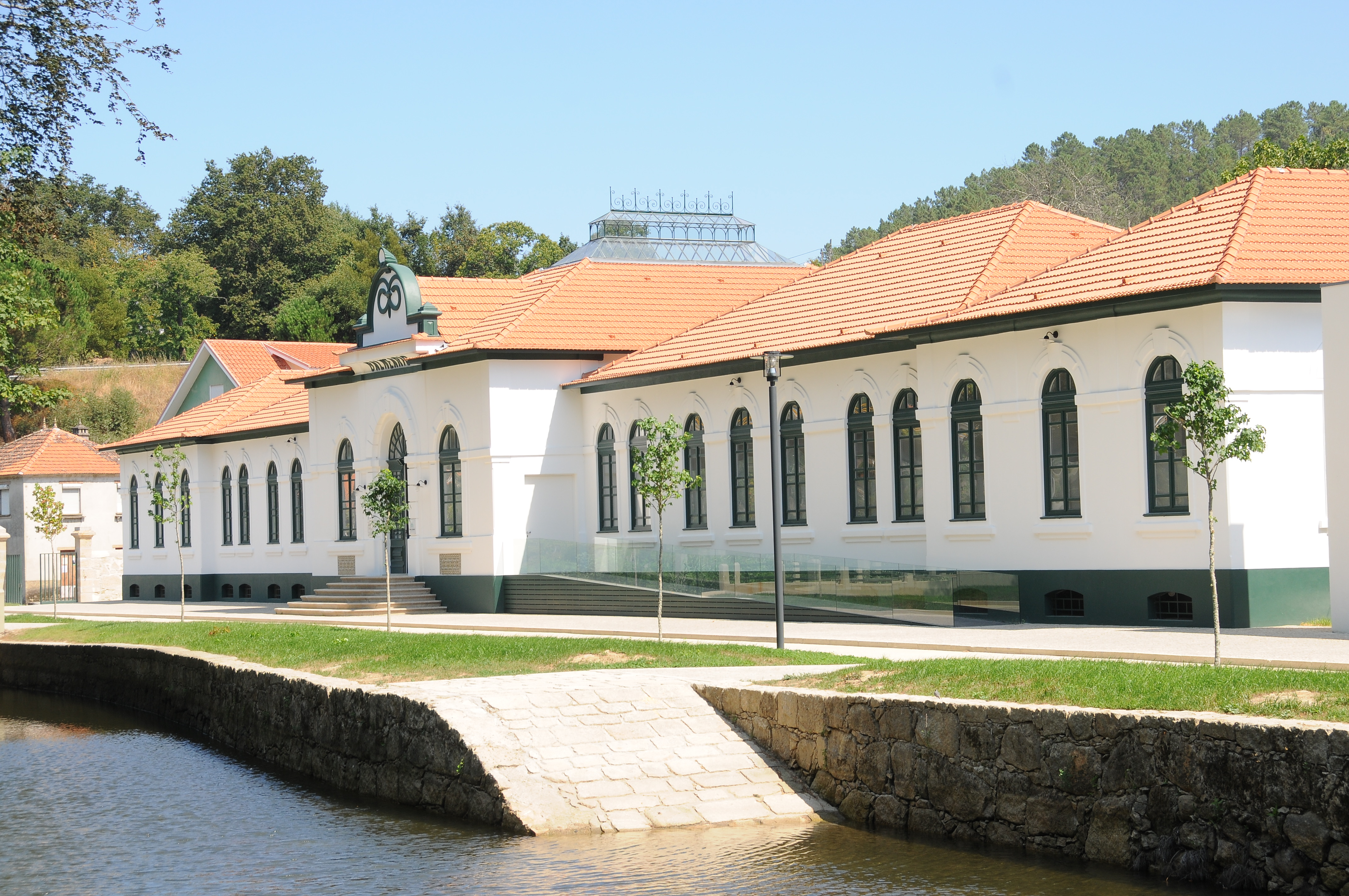
The changing pavilion in the thermal spa

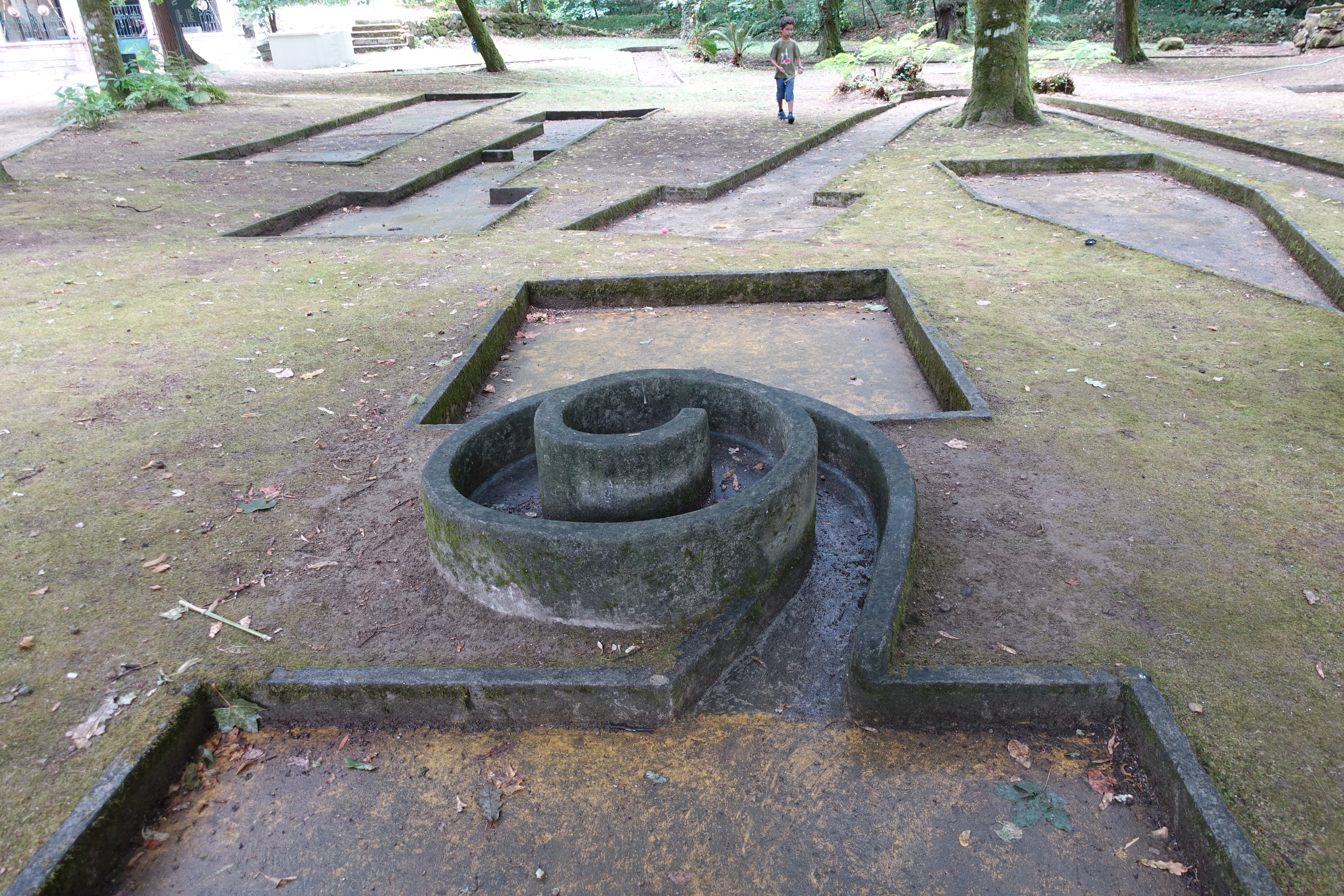
The natural mini-golf course in the park is a hold-over from the 19th century.

The land was purchased on 8 June 1884 from António Júlio Esteves and his wife by António Augusto de Sousa e Castro, and was immediately registered in the municipal authority on 14 August in order to take advantage of the medicinal waters of Peso (by Félix Tomás de Barros Araújo, Bento Maria Barbosa, António Augusto de Sousa e Castro and Victorino Augusto dos Santos Lima). In their petition, they alluded to the gaseous alkaline medicinal waters similar to the public baths in the area referred to as Caldas, in the parish of Prado. Following a series of revisions, on 13 October, a society was constituted to explore the thermal waters, formed by Bento Maria Barbosa, Félix Tomás de Barros de Araújo, António Augusto de Sousa e Castro, Victorino Augusto dos Santos Lima, Abílio Augusto de Sousa, José Francisco de Almeida Fragoso, Aurélia Saavedra e Silva, Dr. António Joaquim Durães, Manuel Bento da Rocha Júnior and Dr. António Pereira de Sousa.

An analysis of the waters was conducted in Porto, which found that the waters were alkaline and gaseous in nature. Starting in 1885, these waters began to be bottled in a wood shed beside the pipes.

Following the death of his father in July 1889, Augusto de Sousa e Castro's heir, António Cândido de Sousa (and Castro Moraes Sarmento) landowners, obtained from the Ministério das Obras Públicas (Ministry of Public Works) a 15-year patent associated with the therapeutic waters of the parishes of Prado and Paderne. This move resulted in a judicial process by the remaining partners on 17 August 1891, that was resolved in July 1893, through a transaction. On 1 May 1894, the Empresa Santos, Sobral & C.ª was constituted with investment capital of 20 contos, of which a portion was conceded legally to the older concessions António Cândido de Sousa and Castro Morais Sarmento.

By 1895, a hotel already dominated the land, constructed by António Guerreiro Ranhada, who had returned from Brazil and discovered that the waters were a therapeutic cure for his liver problems. The hotel was constructed on the land for 40$000, on the site of a minor quarry, with space for 80 guests and a garden designed by José Ranhada. Between 1897 and 1898 there were 731 registered guests to the thermal spa.

On 3 July 1898, the Ministry of Public Works ratified the concession attributed to Santos, Sobral & Co., providing the company with all the rights to explore the spring in perpetuity. On 24 September, the prices were set at the spa, and the following year (14 September 1899), the company began to explore new springs, owing to the movement of visitors to the site, and consumption of the mineral waters. This influx caused a conflict between the company and the Viscountess of Peso, the adjacent property owner, and with whom the Santos, Sobral & Co. wished to expand their explorations. The Viscountess refused to be a partner nor to allow exploration on her property.

In 1901, the Novo Hotel Quinta do Peso was constructed; on inauguration. Its first guest was councilman Manuel Francisco Vargas (from the Ministro das Obras Públicas) and his wife.

On 5 March 1904, the Viscount of Peso solicited permission to explore the mineral water springs on her property. Yet, on 11 November 1904, a dispatch delivered to the Empresa Santos, Sobral & Co. a reserved perimeter of 15 hectares for the exploration of mineral springs, allowing the company to begin its expansion. These surveys were concluded in August 1906: by 1907, the flow of mineral water had expanded from 2,482 litres (656 US gal) per day (1904) to 8,000 litres (2,100 US gal) per day. The company decided to construct a pavilion in order to substitute the pump room that existed. This work, begun in 1909, was under the direction of engineer Couto dos Santos, for a cost of 43 contos, with testing of the water undertaken by professor Charles Lepierre and Dr. António Cruz Magalhães.

On 19 February 1912, José Figueiroa Granja (from Vigo) acquired from José Joaquim Esteves the Novo Hotel da Quinta do Peso, and bankrolled it through the company Figueiroa & Ribas (partly owned with Galician Don Francisco). On 23 August 1913, the animatógrafo Salão de Melgaço in Peso was inaugurated by Cícero Cândido Solheiro.

Shortly following the 10 March 1917, publication Regulamento do estabelecimento hidrológico das Águas Minerais de Melgaço (on the hydrological condition of the mineral waters of Melgaço), there was an article in the Jornal de Melgaço (21 July) by Gregório Fernandes that referred to a dusty access road to the incomplete thermal spa, that was unforested. The buvette (pumping pavilion) was still unfinished and the sanitary conditions of the spa was little hygienically recommendable and was missing a washroom. By August, the management presented to the Repartição de Minas a plan to improve the thermal spa, under the authorship of engineer Couto dos Santos, that included the expansion of the Quinta do Peso lodgings, in accommodate 350 visitors, the construction of a casino, a gymnasium and hydrostatic lake served by swimming huts. On 8 September, though, the Ministério do Interior (Ministry of the Interior), following a complaint from the Viana do Castelo health delegation, affirmed that the bottling of the waters was made without pre-sterilization and washing of bottles.

In 1918, the dispute resurfaces over the exploration of the water resources in Melgaço, resulting in new competitors for the concession that included Empresa Santos, Sobral & Co. (which had adopted its former statutes from 1894), the Empreza das Águas Minerais ou Minero-Medicinais de Melgaço, and the Empreza das Águas Minerais de Melgaço (whose partners included Luís Manuel Solheiro, Lício de Miranda Solheiro and Bento Fernandes Pinto). Santos, Sobral & Co. eliminated (due to its changes) and the other companies issued an embargo over the lands of the Viscountess of Peso. A commission concluded that even if proven to be independent from the sources, they should never be granted to more than one company, otherwise the conflicts will never cease and an agreement between the parties was suggested. An accord was reached between the companies in 1919, resulting from the establishment of the Companhia das Águas de Melgaço. The work on the thermal spa restarted with the first phase in one of the wings, so that it could become functional immediately, with 10 change rooms, showers and two boilers to heat the water.

In October 1920, there was a decision to request a license to explore a second spring (in Prado), due to growth in visitors: by December a project was presented to the council. This project did not proceed well because the site selected for the emergency release was not adequate, resulting in the waters escaping through clay and iron-rich layers resulting in the liberation of gases and loss of water. Therefore, worked continued into 1921, and resulting water directed to the pavilion by a stoneware pipeline of stoneware installed in a separate gallery prepared for technical visits.

In July 1921, a description of the waters in Melgaço described: Hypothermal-Hypomineralized, Gaseous carbonate and bicarbonate, with a mix of Calcium and Sodium, Iron and Magnesium...Util for general illnesses (diabetes, arthritis, etc.), digestive illnesses (Dyspepsia, scarred stomach ulcers, enteritis, etc.) and nervous system (Neurasthenia, hysteria, etc)...

By 1924, the changing areas were completed, at a time that the Thermal Park was delimited, under the work of landscape architect Jacinto de Matos, that included large trees (maples, faia, cedros and tílias, among others). On 21 January 1927, the work on improving the accessways between Monção and Melgaço were put up for tender, along with the 22 kilometres (14 mi) extension of the railway between the two municipalities.

In 1929, a Comissão de Iniciativa (Initiative Commission) introduced improvements at the thermal station. Sections of the women's bathrooms were remodelled, in addition to the installation of a laboratory on site to analyze the waters, as well as an extension that acted as pharmacy. The administrative council also deliberated on expropriation of lands that pertained to the Viscountess of Peso. On 23 March 1930, a notice was issued to attribute a Sevilha Exposition gold medal to the waters of Melgaço. Arborization of the park continued in May, with the planting of trees to provide shade, in addition to flowering plants and fruit trees. Notice on the opening of the change rooms was issued on 8 June, under the direction of Dr. Athias Ark, in addition to providing information on pricing practiced at the site. An article published in August, by the Notícias de Melgaço, referred to the avenues of the park that crossed the property east to west, that connect a new spring that had been discovered, covered in a wooden structure.

Electricity was inaugurated in Peso on 17 May 1931; the establishment of illuminated light allowed access to the thermals in the evening. The gaseous, carbonated baths were expanded as a result. Subsequently, on 3 June, José Figueiroa Granja (the property-owner) requested authorization to expand the hotel. It had recently opened its tennis courts, when in 1932, complaints began arriving that prices had increased too dramatically. At this time, professor Charles Lepierre, collaborating with professor Herculando de Carvalho, repeated the analysis of the waters of Melgaço, which was the first complete examination of the new springs. Radioactive surveys verified that the waters of the new spring were more alkaline and rich in minerals.

In 1934, the company Vidago, Melgaço e Pedras Salgadas was constituted, absorbing the capital of the Companhia Portuguesa das Águas Salus. Following their acquisition, a new analysis of the waters by professor Herculano de Carvalho, referred to the existence a variation in the alkalinity in the two springs, that included magnesium, silica and carbon dioxide. Beginning in 1935, the clinical directorate began to employ glycemic curves systematically as a method of investigating the effects of the water on diabetes sufferers. With consistent growth and visitors, at the beginning of the 1950s, there was a need to erect a specific building to shelter the water from the Prado spring, in order to substitute the wooden structure. By 1953, the construction was inaugurated.

In 1998, Vidago, Melgaço e Pedras Salgadas along with the municipal council of Melgaço presented their candidature to PITER Projeto Integrado Turístico Estruturante de Base Regional (which supported the region of National Park of Peneda-Gerês), as a public-private company to proceed with recuperation and thermal spa and the springs in the region. In 200, Melgaço approved the remodelling and expansion of the spa. These initiatives lead to the 20 December 2002, petition to classify the thermals as a Imóvel de Interesse Municipal (Property of Municipal Interest), then reinforced on 9 March 2004 by moves by the DRPorto to open a process to classify the Thermal Park of Peso, later supported by the Vice-President of the IPPAR (12 October). In June 2005, the PITER program was prorogued. The attempts to classify the property continued on 31 May 2012, with a proposal by the DRCNorte to classify the park as a Monumento de Interesse Público (Monument of Public Interest) and fix it within its own Special Protection Zone (ZPE), which was accepted by the National Culture Council of SPAA. The classification was promulgated on 7 November 2012 as Announcement 13661/2012 (Diário da República, Série 2, 215 (7 Novembro 2012).

The bottling of the alkaline waters ceased in 2003, and work to recuperate the principal spring began in 2005.

== Architecture ==
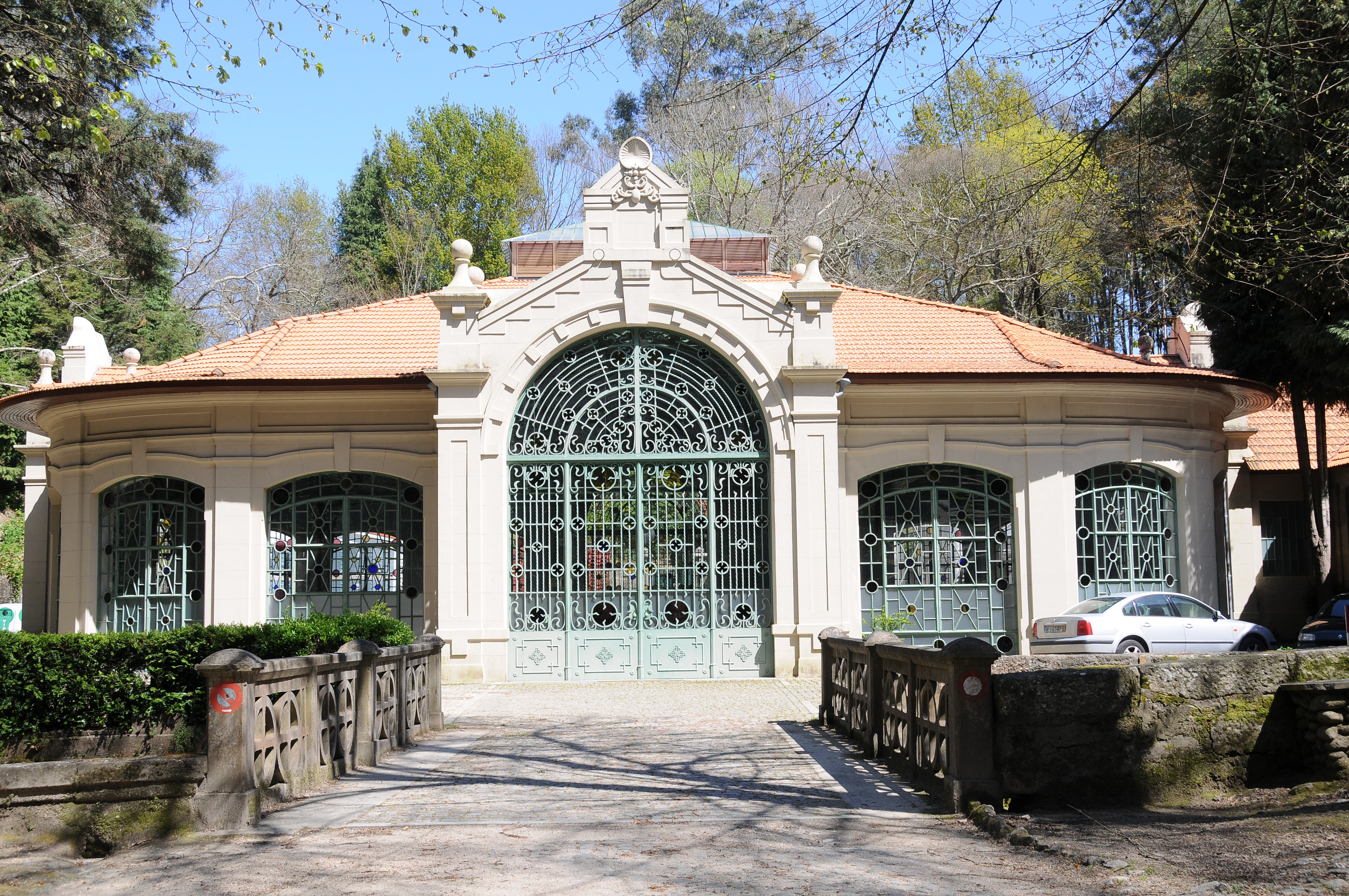
The exterior of the main thermal spring pavilion showing the intricate geometric iron gates

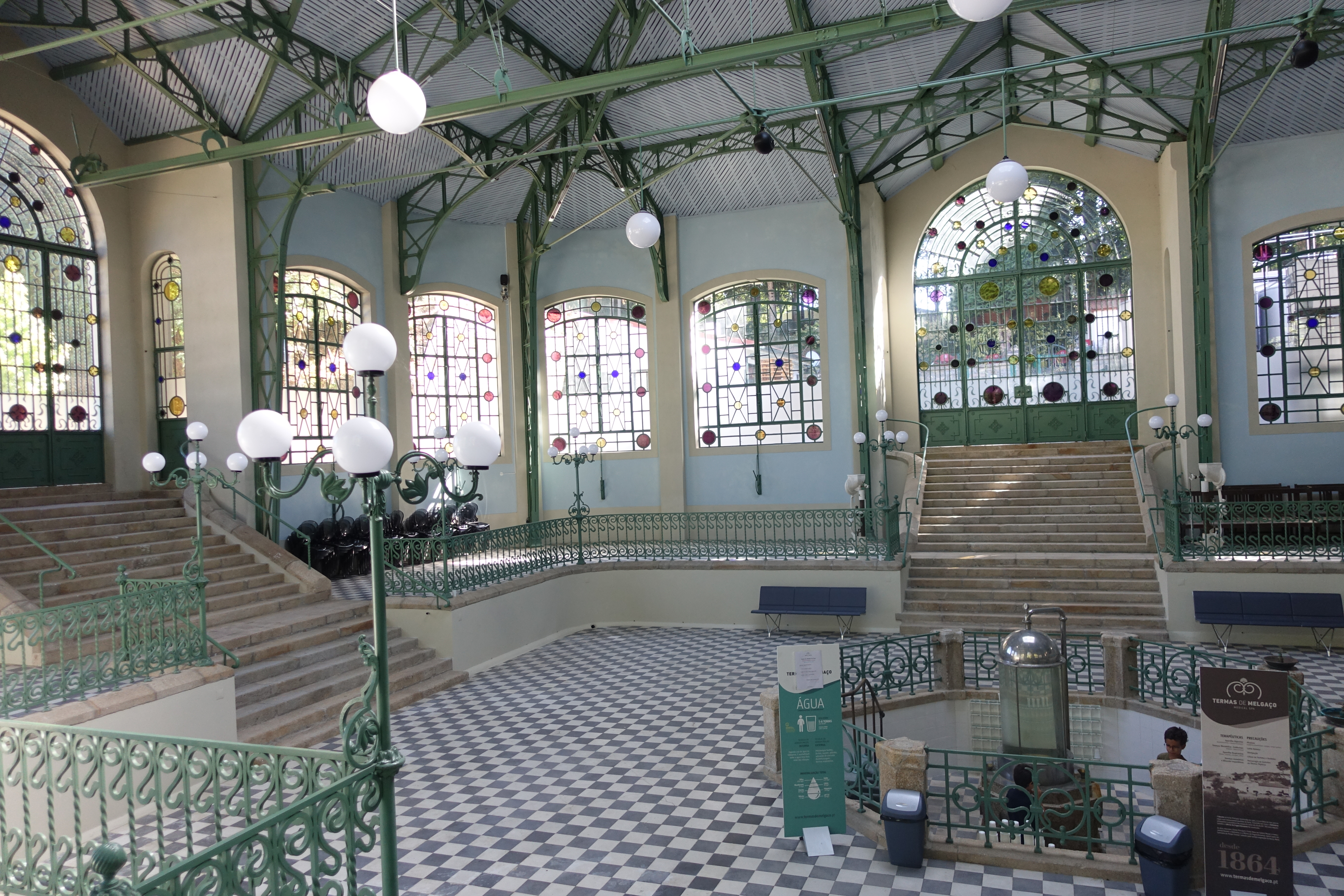
The purely 19th-century design includes three staircases leading to the main sunken spring, revisited in ceramic tile and iron rails.

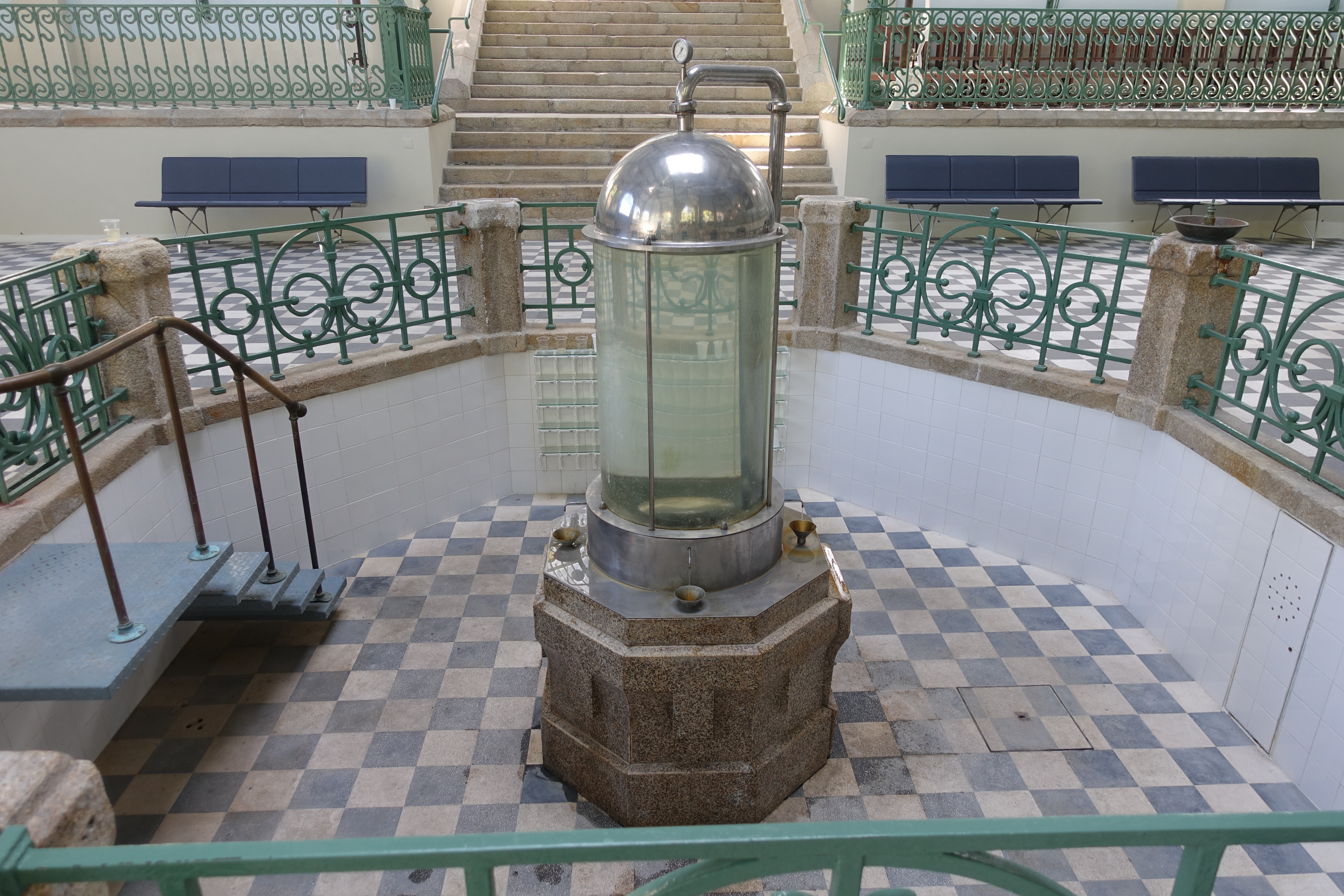
At the lowest level is the glass-enclosed fountain and spout, surrounded by overflow gutter

The thermal park and spa are located in isolated urban context surrounded and delimited by walls surmounted by grade and crossed by the Ribeira da Folia. It is implanted to the left of the Estrada Nacional E.N.202, running west to east, while nearby are situated the Pensão do Peso and in its northwest interior the Ponte da Folia. The park is covered in trees and plants and crossed by a central avenue that connects to other paths, waterfalls and a small lake. The various buildings and structures in the park include: the pavilion of the principal spring, a changeroom, a fountain, and the bottling plant.

=== Pavilion ===
This rectangular structure has an advanced central corp and is covered by an articulated roof with an integrated central skylight. The facades in cornerstone and granite have successive pilasters supporting an entablature with frieze, superimposed by wooden flap. Each vain opens to a rounded arch and is interconnected by frieze at the arched cornice, along with glass iron doors, painted in green and decorated with geometric motifs (that integrate simple and polychromatic glasses).

The interior is plastered and painted blue, encircled granite base and sections defined by pilasters where iron structures that support that roof are affixed, lined with wooden lathes painted in blue. The main doorways are in the east, north and west preceded by three ample stairs with iron guardrail and ceramic flooring. In the centre of the building is the primitive buvette thermal spring recessed into an octagonal plan with similar pavement, and protected by iron grate, painted green (with faceted basins on angles). The fountain is protected by a cylindrical bell-shaped structure. Around the building is a raised wing, accessed by an intermediary landing of stairs, with black and white ceramic floors and iron guard painted green, decorated by stylized voluptuous motifs. These structures also integrate lamps on their angles into the high columns, with globe of lighting surrounded by several stylized arms (the globe lighting repeated from the ceiling). A gutter runs along the lowest part of the interior with drains in the corners. A centralized apparatus opens the six central rotary panels; by using a vertical iron rod, moved by a lever, allows the windows to be opened simultaneously. The rooftop is a grid of horizontal rods with bearings that run north to south supporting the weight of the structure.
