= Remoães =

- Civil parish
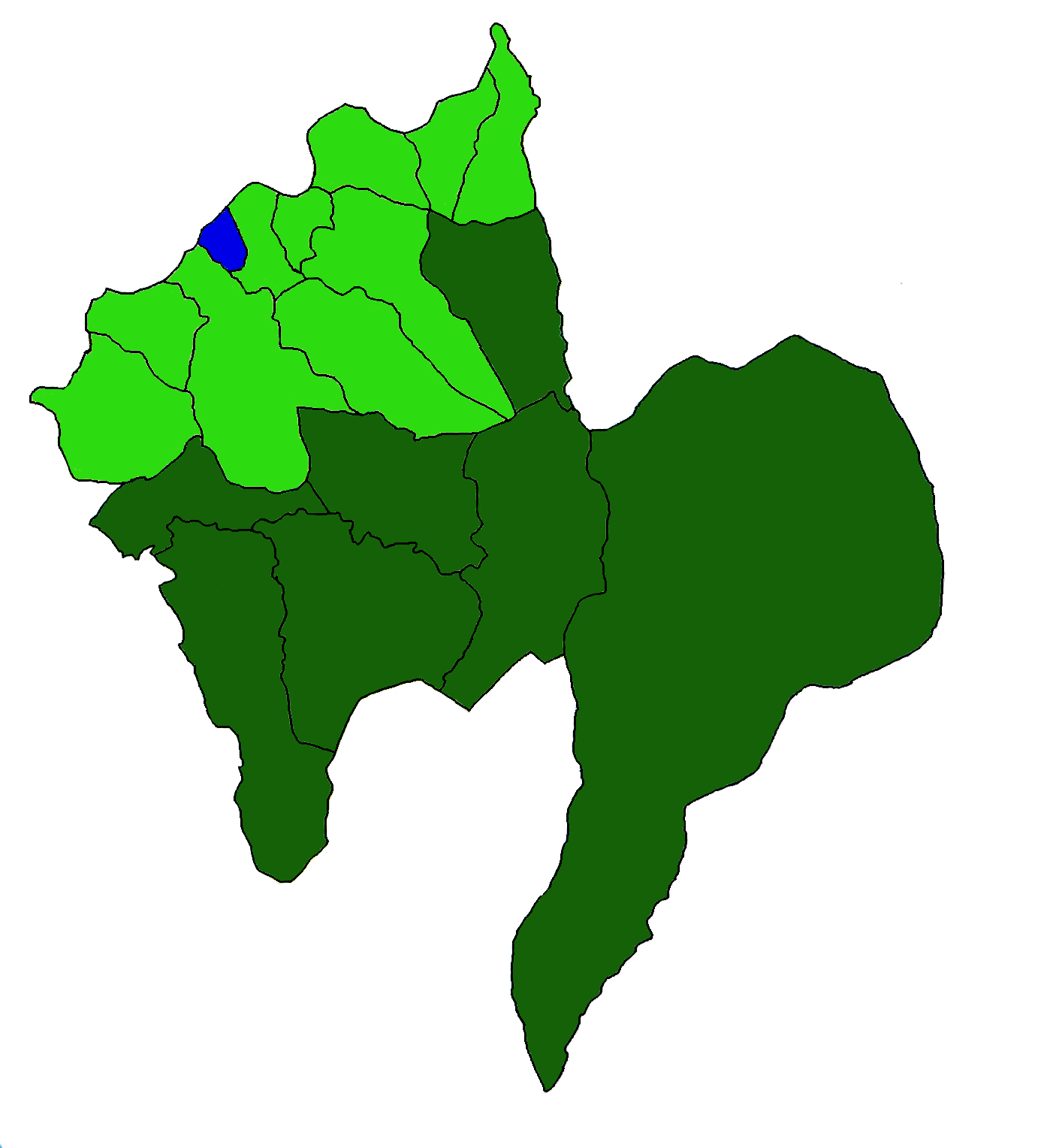
- Coordinates: 42°06′40″N 8°17′12″W
- Country: Portugal
- Region: Norte
- Intermunic. comm.: Alto Minho
- District: Viana do Castelo
- Municipality: Melgaço
- Disbanded: 2013

Area
  - Total: 0.96 km^{2} (0.37 sq mi)

Population
  - Total: 124
  - Density: 130/km^{2} (330/sq mi)
- Time zone: UTC+00:00 (WET)
  - Summer (DST): UTC+01:00 (WEST)

Remoães is a former civil parish in the municipality of Melgaço in the Viana do Castelo District, Portugal. In 2013, the parish merged into the new parish Prado e Remoães. It has a population of 124 inhabitants and a total area of 0.96 km^{2}.

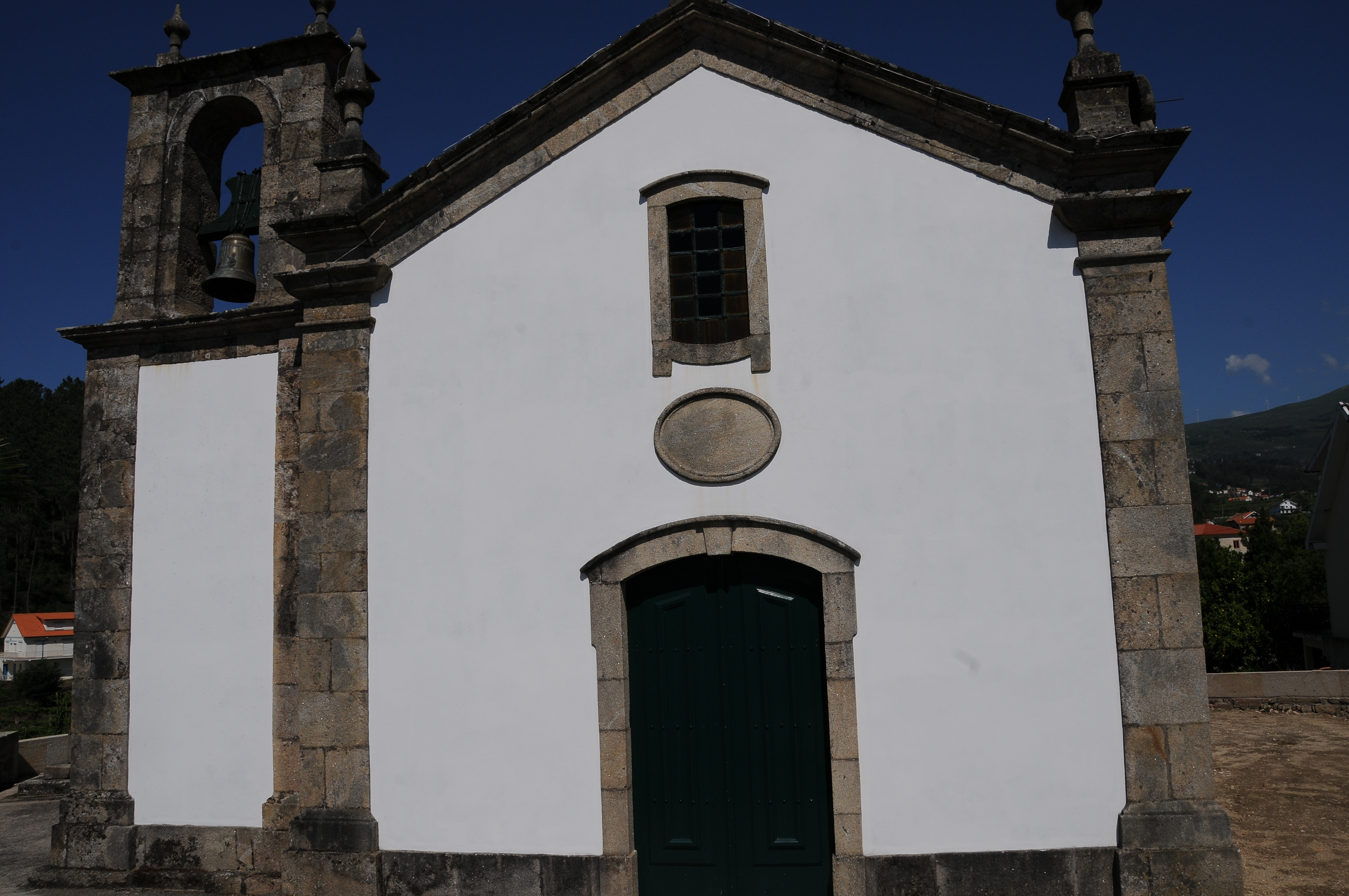
Remoães Church
