= Parada do Monte =

- Civil parish
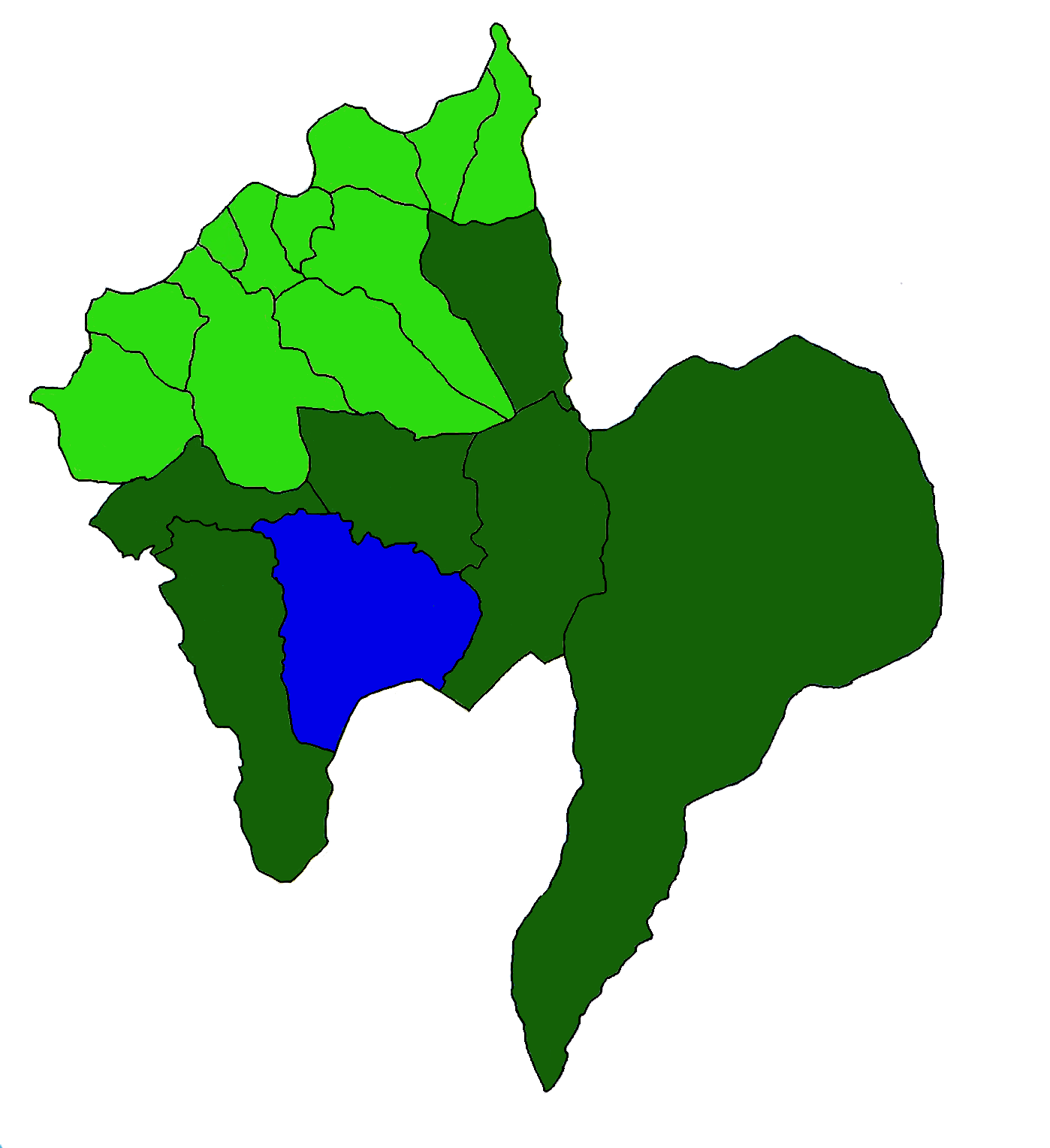
- Coordinates: 42°02′32″N 8°15′56″W
- Country: Portugal
- Region: Norte
- Intermunic. comm.: Alto Minho
- District: Viana do Castelo
- Municipality: Melgaço
- Disbanded: 2013

Area
  - Total: 27.32 km^{2} (10.55 sq mi)

Population
  - Total: 487
  - Density: 18/km^{2} (46/sq mi)
- Time zone: UTC+00:00 (WET)
  - Summer (DST): UTC+01:00 (WEST)

Parada do Monte is a former civil parish in the municipality of Melgaço in the Viana do Castelo District, Portugal. In 2013, the parish merged into the new parish Parada do Monte e Cubalhão. It has a population of 487 inhabitants and a total area of 27.32 km^{2}.

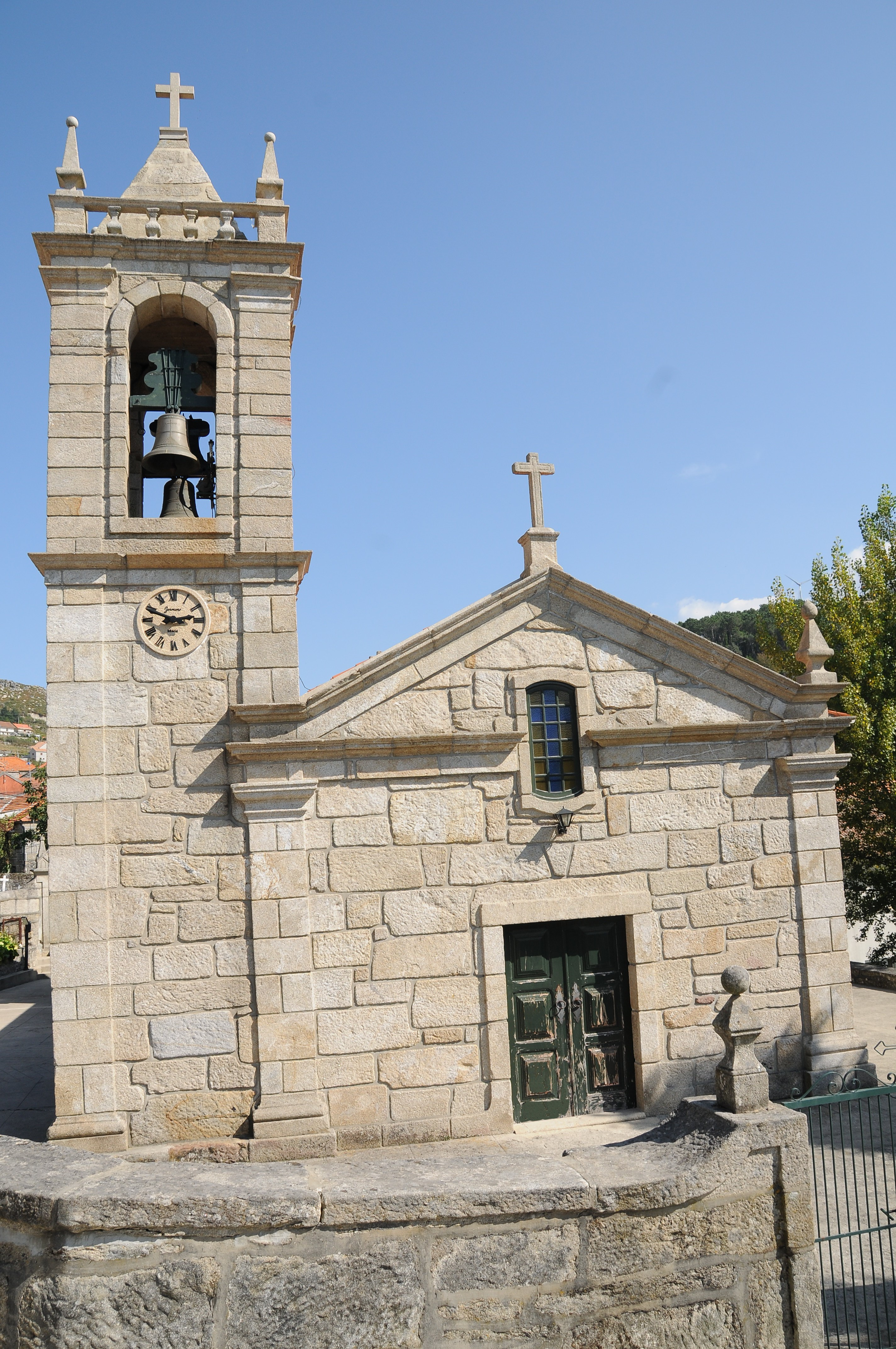
Parada do Monte Church
