= Prado e Remoães =

- Civil parish
- Location in Portugal
- Coordinates: 42.110°N 8.275°W
- Country: Portugal
- Region: Norte
- Intermunic. comm.: Alto Minho
- District: Viana do Castelo
- Municipality: Melgaço

Area
  - Total: 3.67 km^{2} (1.42 sq mi)

Population (2011)
  - Total: 550
  - Density: 150/km^{2} (390/sq mi)
- Time zone: UTC+00:00 (WET)
  - Summer (DST): UTC+01:00 (WEST)

Prado e Remoães is a civil parish in the municipality of Melgaço, Portugal. It was formed in 2013 by the merger of the former parishes Prado and Remoães. The population in 2011 was 550, in an area of 3.67 km^{2}.
