= Church of São Martinho (Alvaredo) =

Alvaredo Church
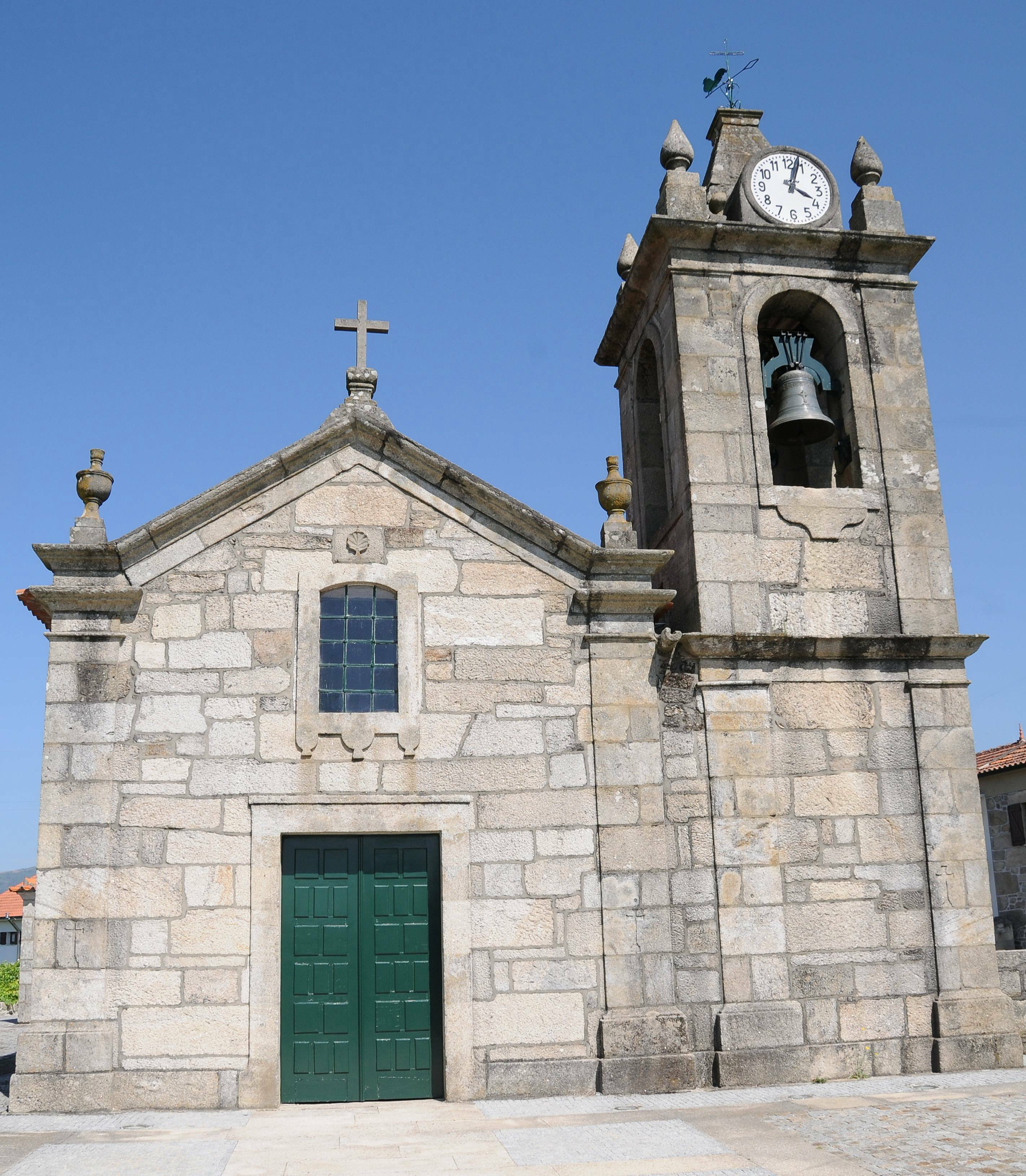

Religion
- Affiliation: Roman Catholic
- Ecclesiastical or organisational status: Church

Location
- Location: Alvaredo, Melgaço, Portugal
- Interactive map of Alvaredo Church
- Coordinates: 42°05′40.65″N 8°18′05.95″W

Architecture
- Type: Church

Specifications
- Direction of façade: West
- Length: 22 metres (72 ft)
- Width: 9 metres (30 ft)
- Materials: Granite

Alvaredo Church is a Roman Catholic church in the Shrine of Saint Martin in Alvaredo, Melgaço, Portugal.
