= Parada do Monte e Cubalhão =

- Civil parish
- Location in Portugal
- Coordinates: 42.05°N 8.25°W
- Country: Portugal
- Region: Norte
- Intermunic. comm.: Alto Minho
- District: Viana do Castelo
- Municipality: Melgaço

Area
  - Total: 29.84 km^{2} (11.52 sq mi)

Population (2011)
  - Total: 526
  - Density: 18/km^{2} (46/sq mi)
- Time zone: UTC+00:00 (WET)
  - Summer (DST): UTC+01:00 (WEST)

Parada do Monte e Cubalhão is a civil parish in the municipality of Melgaço, Portugal. It was formed in 2013 by the merger of the former parishes Parada do Monte and Cubalhão. The population in 2011 was 526, in an area of 29.84 km^{2}.
