= São Paio (Melgaço) =

- Civil parish
- Location in Portugal
- Coordinates: 42.092°N 8.254°W
- Country: Portugal
- Region: Norte
- Intermunic. comm.: Alto Minho
- District: Viana do Castelo
- Municipality: Melgaço

Area
  - Total: 9.95 km^{2} (3.84 sq mi)

Population (2011)
  - Total: 602
  - Density: 61/km^{2} (160/sq mi)
- Time zone: UTC+00:00 (WET)
  - Summer (DST): UTC+01:00 (WEST)

São Paio is a Portuguese parish, located in the municipality of Melgaço. The population in 2011 was 602, in an area of 9.95 km^{2}.

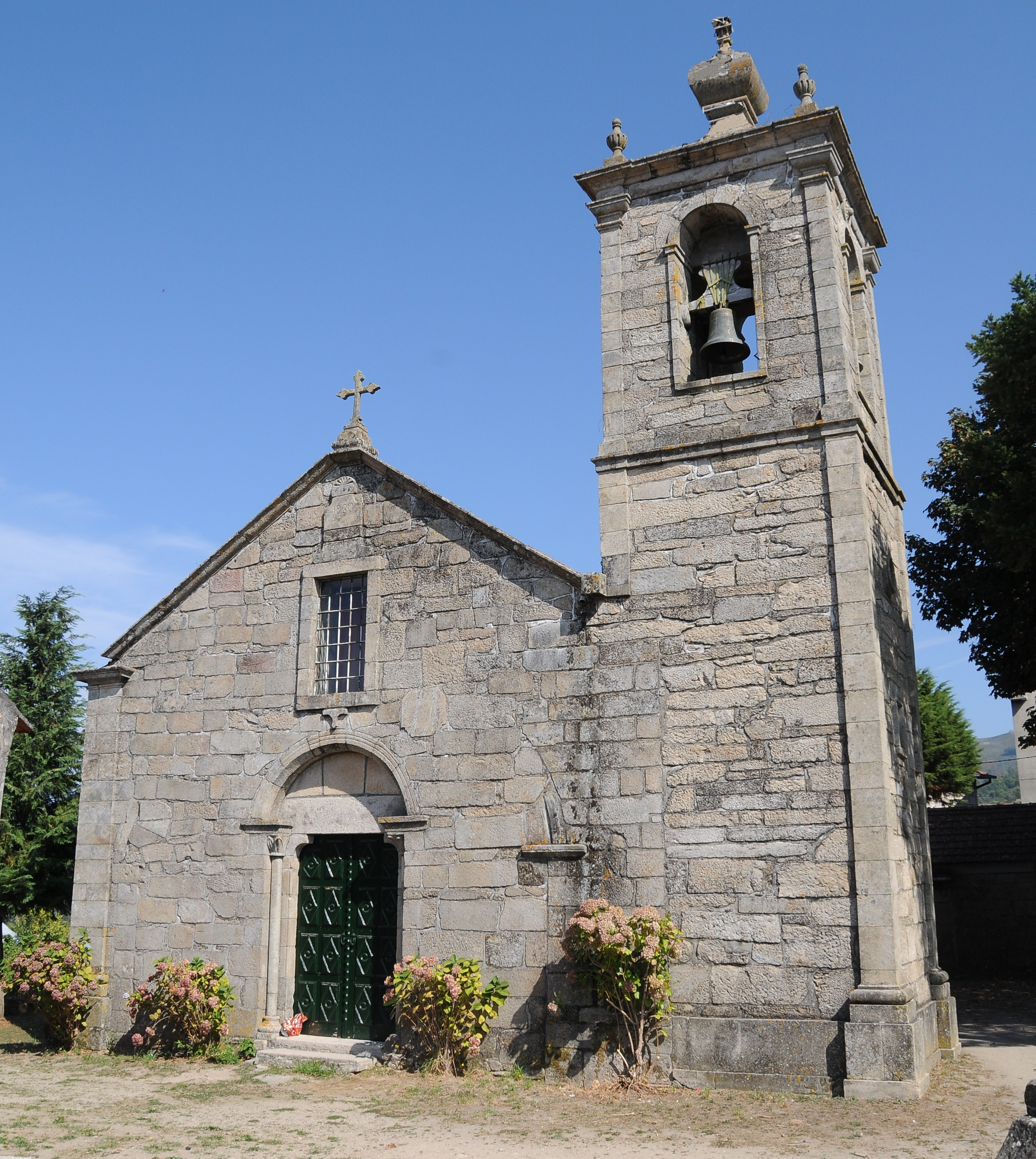
São Paio Church
