= Prado (Melgaço) =

- Civil parish
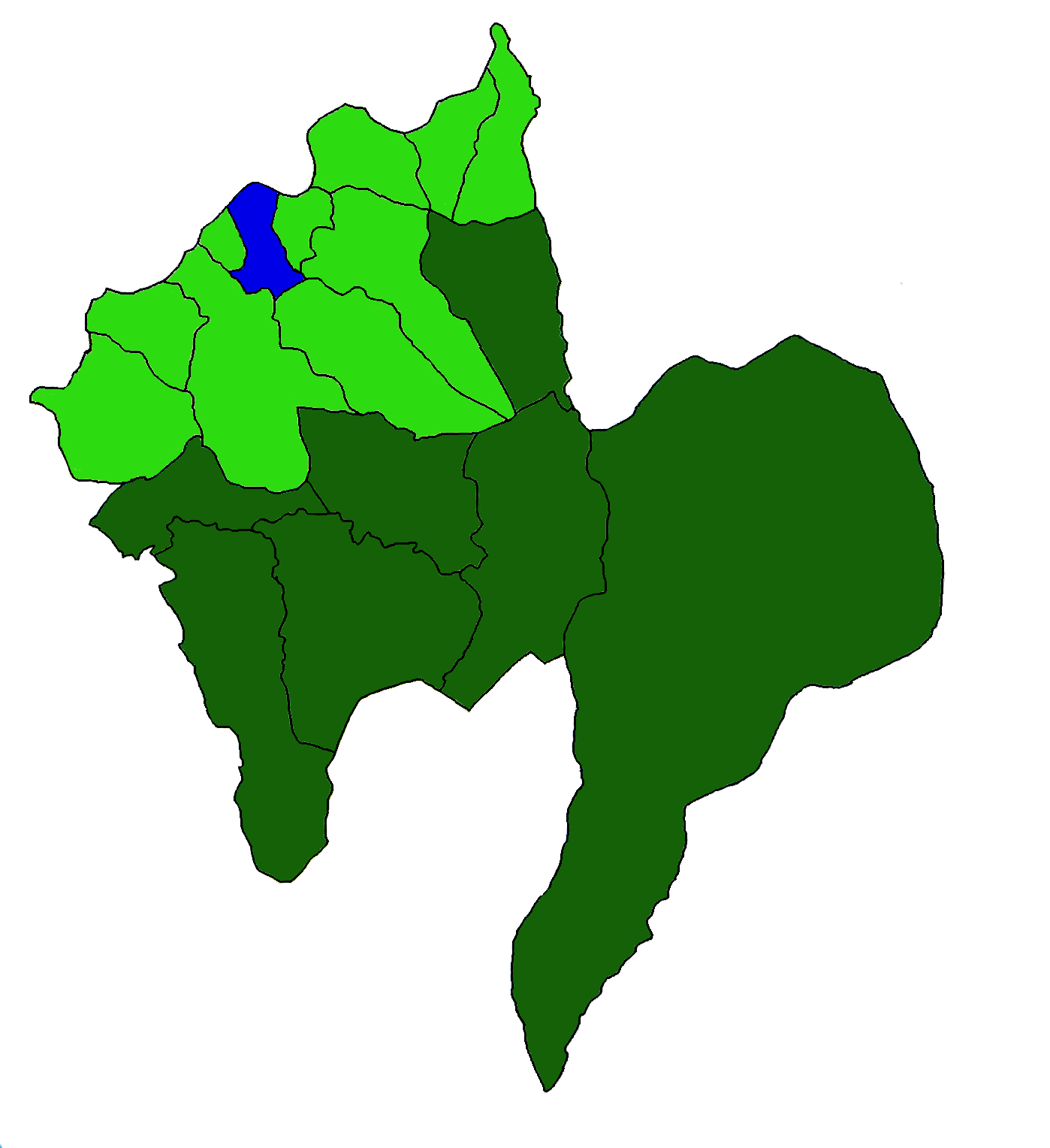
- Coordinates: 42°06′54″N 8°16′25″W
- Country: Portugal
- Region: Norte
- Intermunic. comm.: Alto Minho
- District: Viana do Castelo
- Municipality: Melgaço
- Disbanded: 2013

Area
  - Total: 2.61 km^{2} (1.01 sq mi)

Population
  - Total: 468
  - Density: 180/km^{2} (460/sq mi)
- Time zone: UTC+00:00 (WET)
  - Summer (DST): UTC+01:00 (WEST)

Prado is a former civil parish in the municipality of Melgaço in the Viana do Castelo District, Portugal. In 2013, the parish merged into the new parish Prado e Remoães. It has a population of 468 inhabitants and a total area of 2.61 km^{2}.
