= Gave (Melgaço) =

- Civil parish
- Location in Portugal
- Coordinates: 42.045°N 8.294°W
- Country: Portugal
- Region: Norte
- Intermunic. comm.: Alto Minho
- District: Viana do Castelo
- Municipality: Melgaço

Area
  - Total: 18.64 km^{2} (7.20 sq mi)

Population (2011)
  - Total: 237
  - Density: 13/km^{2} (33/sq mi)
- Time zone: UTC+00:00 (WET)
  - Summer (DST): UTC+01:00 (WEST)

Gave is a Portuguese parish, located in the municipality of Melgaço. The population in 2011 was 237, in an area of 18.64 km^{2}.

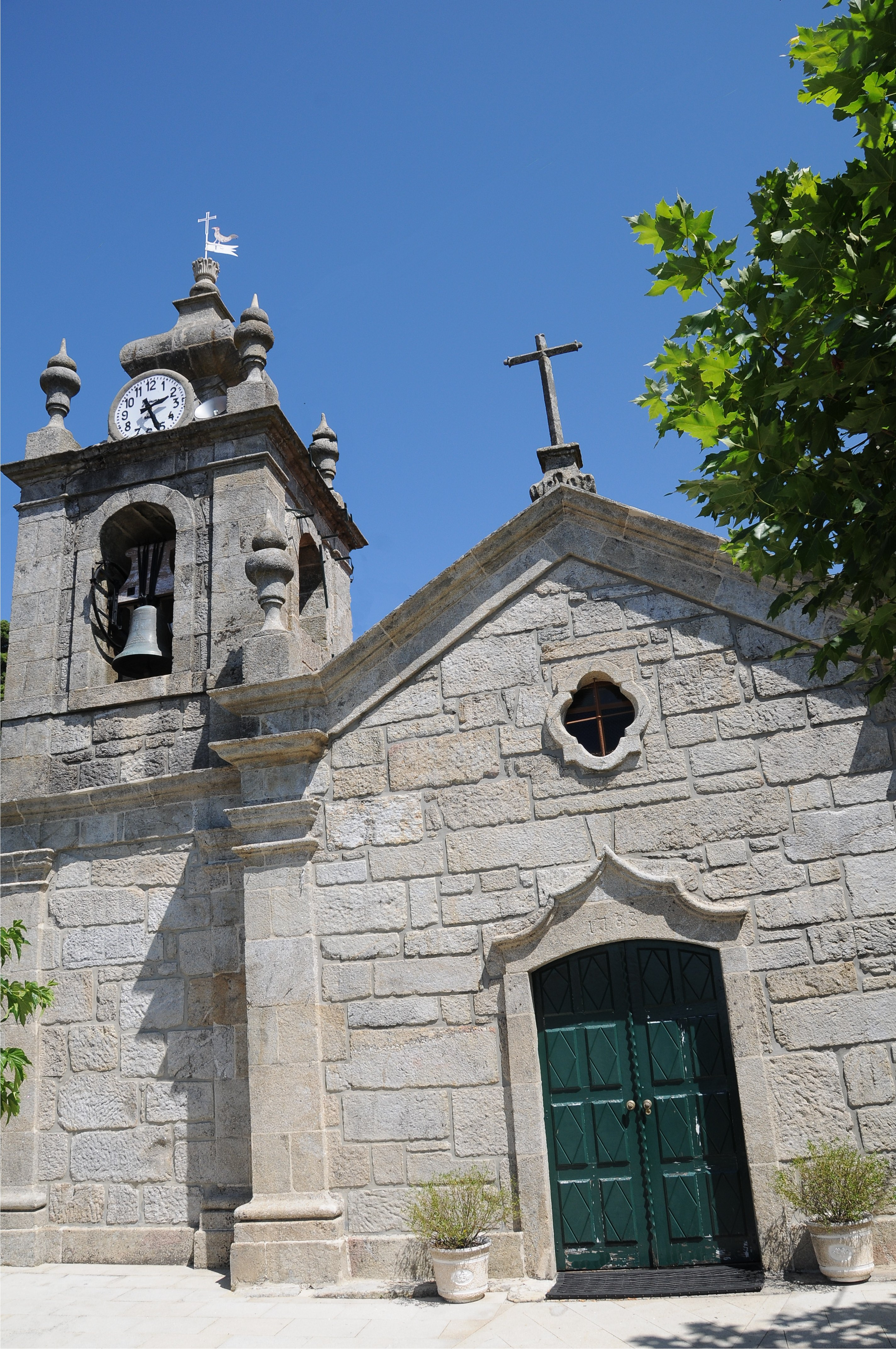
Gave Church
