= Fountain of São João (Melgaço) =

Fountain in Melgaço, Portugal

- Fonte de São João
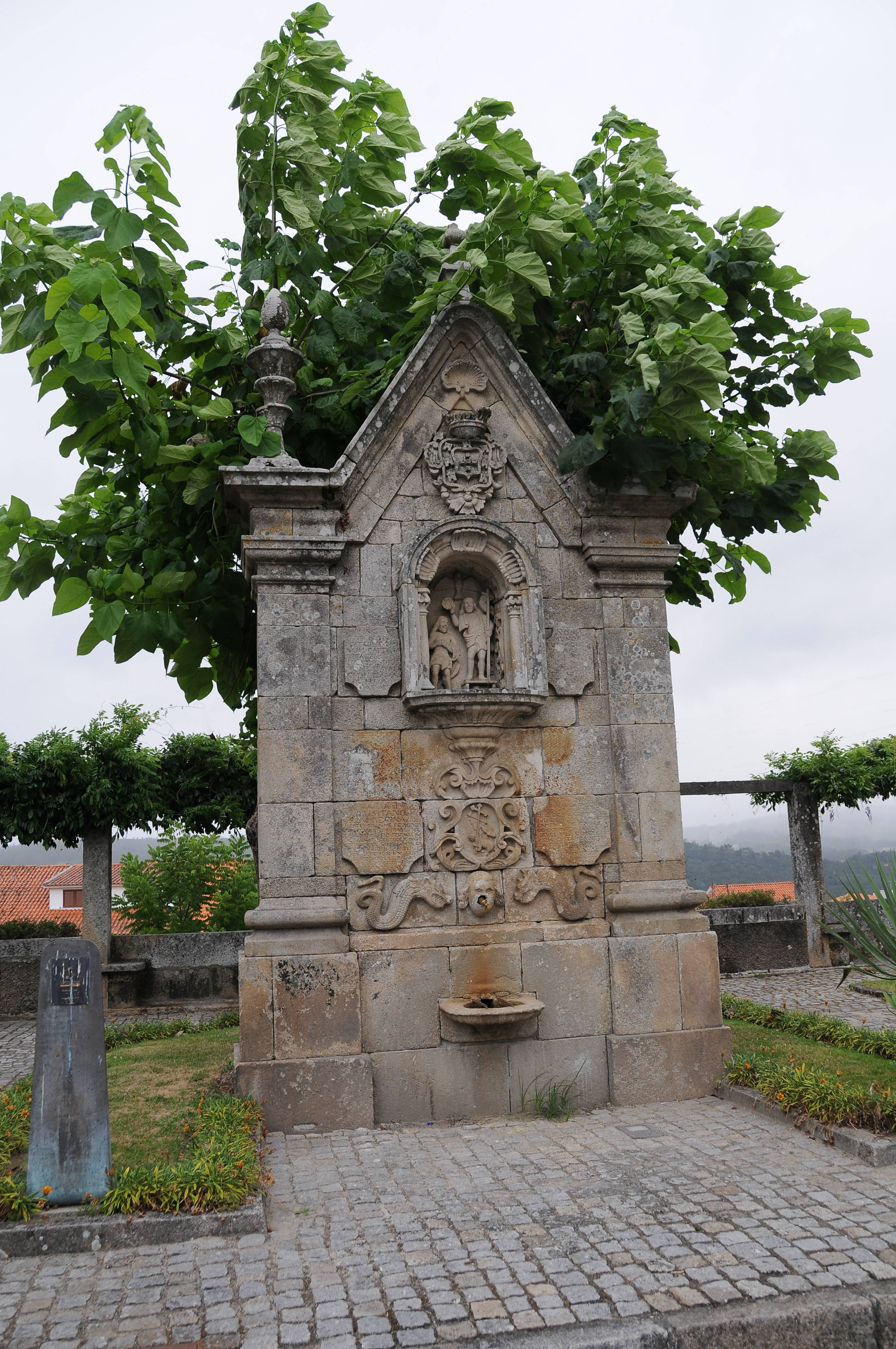
- The vertical fountain, almost obstructed by the tree
- Year: c. 1780
- Medium: Granite fountain
- Location: Melgaço, Portugal
- 42°6′53.33″N 8°15′28.14″W
- Owner: Portuguese Republic

The Fountain of São João (Portuguese: Fonte de São João) is a fountain in the civil parish of Melgaço, in northern Portugal.

== History ==
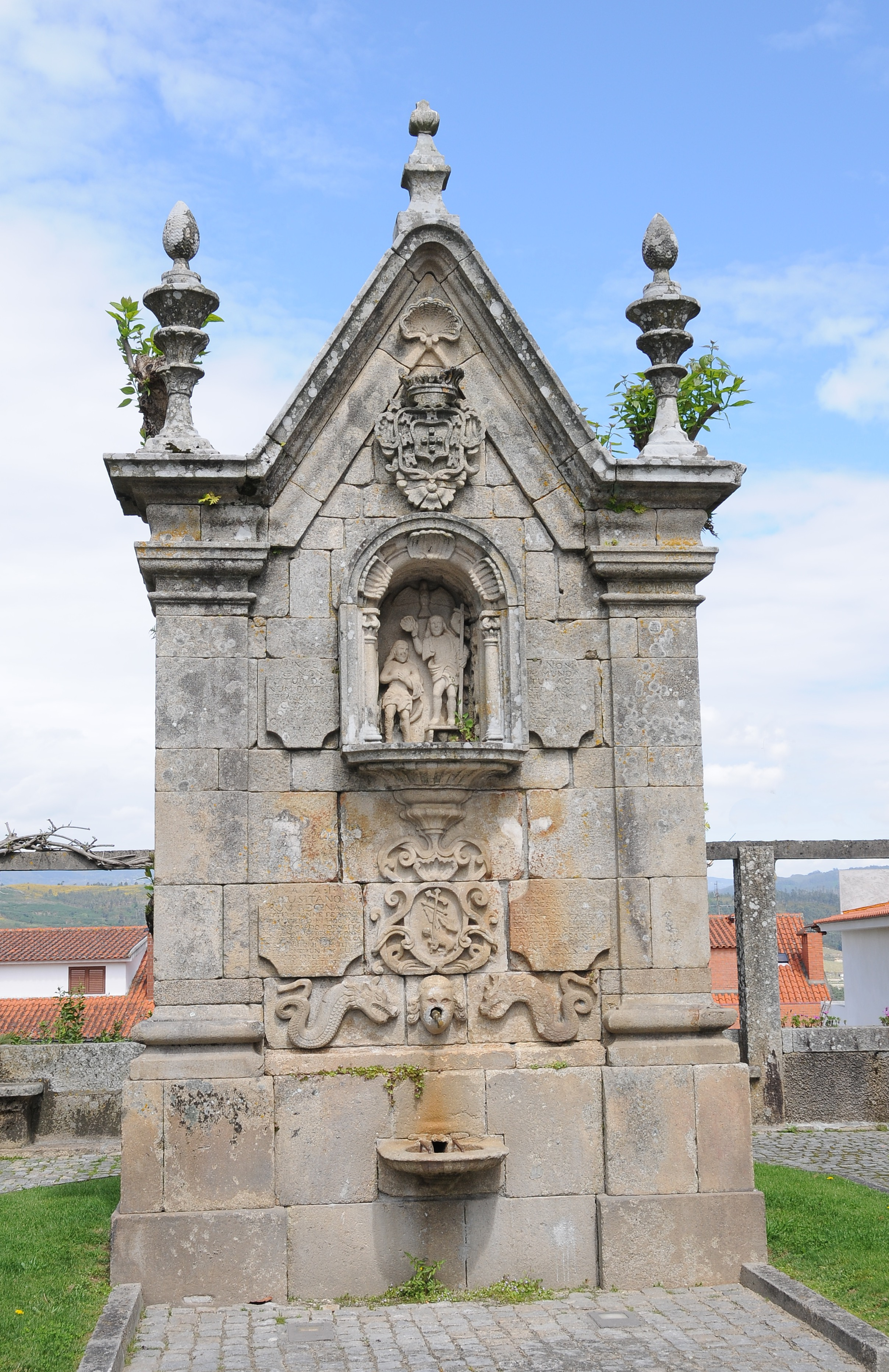
The fountain of São João consisting of triangular pediment and backrest

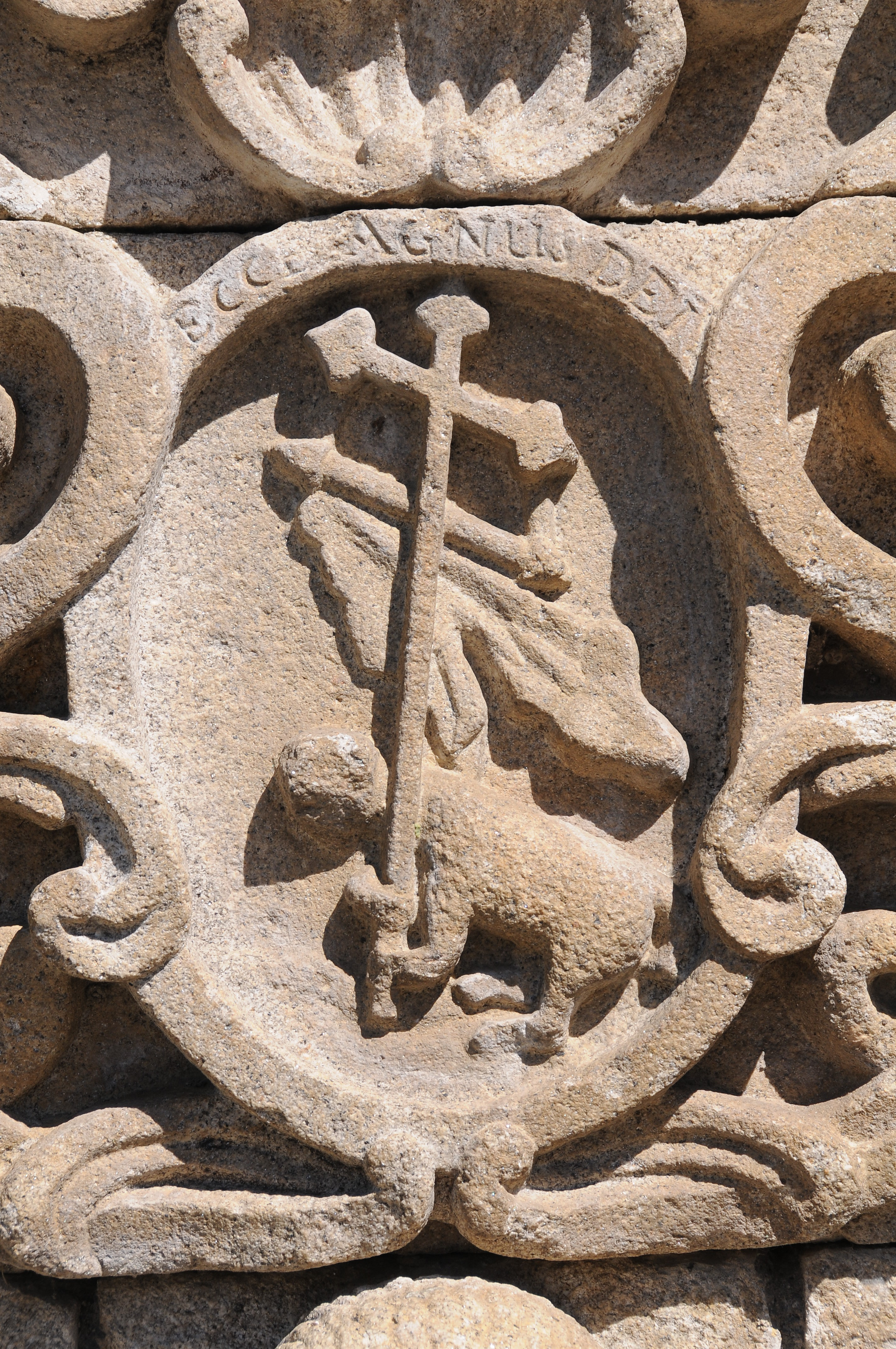
The Agnus Dei above the water spout, surrounded by phytomorphic elements

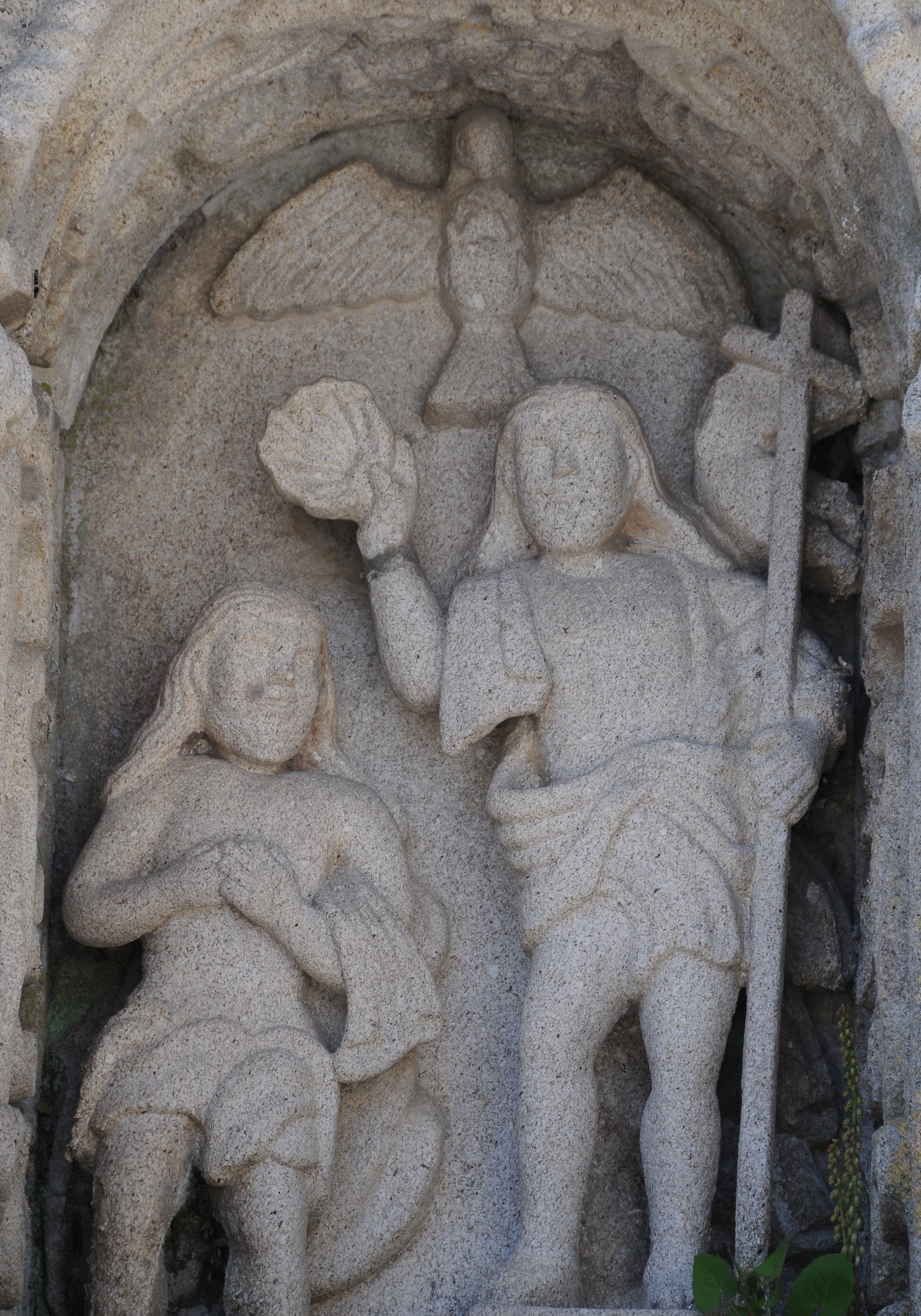
Sculpture of the baptizing of Jesus Christ by John the Baptist

The fountain dates to 1780, with the payment for the construction funded by Dr. João Pedro de Sá, the juiz de fora for the town of Melgaço, who lived in the locality of Assadura. He was supported with donations from the nobility of the town of Melgaço.

In 1903, the fountain was transferred to the Praça da República in the municipality. At the beginning of the 20th century, the Praça da Repúblic was already punctuated with trees; the fountain was located in the area opposite the castle and old Conde de Ferreira Primary School.

In May 1970, a ministerial dispatch approved the study into moving the fountain from eastern part of the Praça da República to the northeast corner of the square. From a document to the director of the Fine Arts School (in 1971), the DGEMN referred to the move of the fountain to the new location, be referred to the, then, uncompleted treatment of joints and connection to the public water system. The project presupposed a garden and landscaping of the space, limited to the corners and public access pavement. Finding that the location of the staircase would create difficulties, the DGEMN decided to solicit the municipal government technicians in order to conclude the project.

== Characteristics ==
The fountain in located in an urban environment, situated on the northeast corner of the Praça da República, with a small landscaped area, with pavement running parallel. The zone is delimited by a masonry wall with stone bunks, which constitutes a small lookout over the residences of the town, and the Minho valley.

The fountain consists of a tall vertical rectangular backrest and stone body, marked by a wider base and triangular pediment. Above the base are two Tuscan pilasters, that extend into the body, crowned by slender cone-type pinnacles. The triangular/gabled pediment is traced by the lines of the frieze and cornices, also surmounted by a pinnacle.

The lower part of the backrest includes a spout, that extends from an anthropomorphic figure, with undulating hair, while the figure is flanked by two serpents, with heads of dragons. Surmounting these figures is a concave niche sheltering an Agnus Dei, with the inscription ECCE AGNUS DEI, surrounded by phytomorphic elements extending vertically. The niche is flanked by inscription stones, with the left panel showing Latin text, while the side opposite in Portuguese, both without rounded corners and 1780 date. Above this is another niche with flanking pilasters, forming a Roman arch, that shelter a sculpture of John the Baptist baptizing Christ. This niche is also surmounted by the Portuguese coat-of-arms in relief and shell. No alinhamento da bica, surge no embasamento bacia rectangular de perfil curvo.

The inscription stones on either side of the Agnus Dei are inscriptions. To the left, in Latin: MARIA I LUSITANORUM RE..NAE.. GRATIA JOANNE PETRO SA.. PUBIEIDO IN HOC MELGA..NSI OPPIDO FORMSI IU DICE SE NATUS PRESIDE CONDE FORA... QUE TAN..UAM IN CA.. TREITORII CONSTITUTE .. COND..UN HOC FUET EDICTO ..DUSTIMAQUE HUIUS MAGISTRATUR ANA MDCCLXXX; to the right in Portuguese: ESTA OBRA MANDOV FAZER O DOVTOR JOÃO PEDRO DE SALES CAVALEIRO JUIS DE FORA COMP..CAMENTO DE CA.... DE COMARCA NESTA NOTAVEL VILA DE MELGAÇO À SUA CUSTA E DA NOBREZA .... Aboves these inscriptions are carved: NOM MUNDATUR AQUIS SED AQUA ... HIC MUNDAT.... ; TINGE RUE NON ICITUR DOMINUM BAPTISTA RECUSE... CRIMINIBUS NOS ...QUE..ZAVA .. RA PARAT.
