= Cousso =

- Civil parish
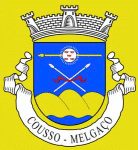
- Coat of arms

- Location in Portugal
- Coordinates: 42.060°N 8.299°W
- Country: Portugal
- Region: Norte
- Intermunic. comm.: Alto Minho
- District: Viana do Castelo
- Municipality: Melgaço

Area
  - Total: 7.23 km^{2} (2.79 sq mi)

Population (2011)
  - Total: 294
  - Density: 41/km^{2} (110/sq mi)
- Time zone: UTC+00:00 (WET)
  - Summer (DST): UTC+01:00 (WEST)

Cousso is a Portuguese freguesia ("civil parish") in the municipality of Melgaço. The population in 2011 was 294, in an area of 7.23 km^{2}.

== Architecture ==
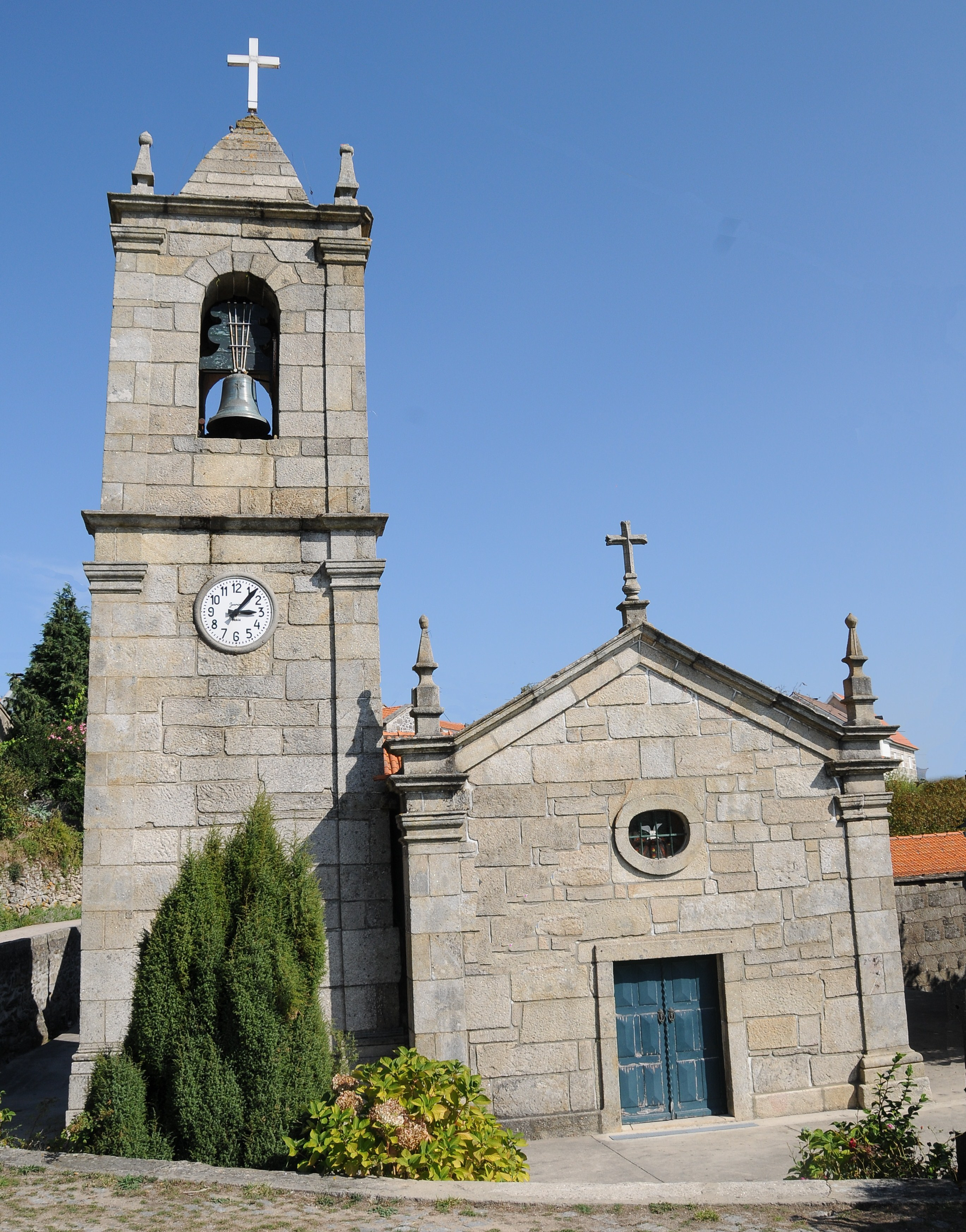
Cousso Church

- Chapel of Senhora da Boa Morte (Portuguese: Capela da Senhora da Boa Morte)
- Chapel of São Tiago (Portuguese: Capela de São Tiago)
- Cross of Cousso (Portuguese: Cruzeiro de Cousso)
- Church of São Tiago (Portuguese: Igreja Paroquial de Cousso/Igreja de São Tomé)
