= Arganão =

Portuguese mythical figure

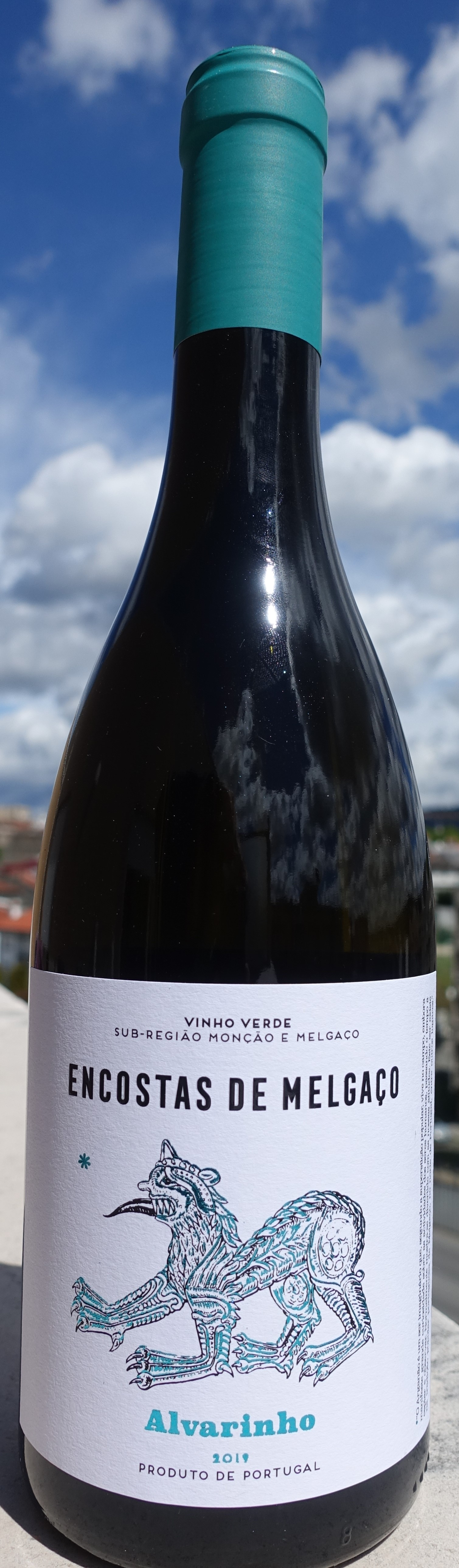
Arganão in a botle of Alvarinho wine

The arganão is a mythical figure, originating from the oral tradition of Melgaço, Portugal.

According to popular tales, he lives in the fields, though he can't hide his intense curiosity about people's daily lives. It is said that he spends his days secretly observing them, always attentive to their activities.
