= Alvaredo =

- Civil parish
- Location in Portugal
- Coordinates: 42.095°N 8.303°W
- Country: Portugal
- Region: Norte
- Intermunic. comm.: Alto Minho
- District: Viana do Castelo
- Municipality: Melgaço

Area
  - Total: 4.36 km^{2} (1.68 sq mi)

Population (2011)
  - Total: 528
  - Density: 120/km^{2} (310/sq mi)
- Time zone: UTC+00:00 (WET)
  - Summer (DST): UTC+01:00 (WEST)

Alvaredo is a Portuguese freguesia ("civil parish"), located in the municipality of Melgaço. The population in 2011 was 528, in an area of 4.36 km^{2}.

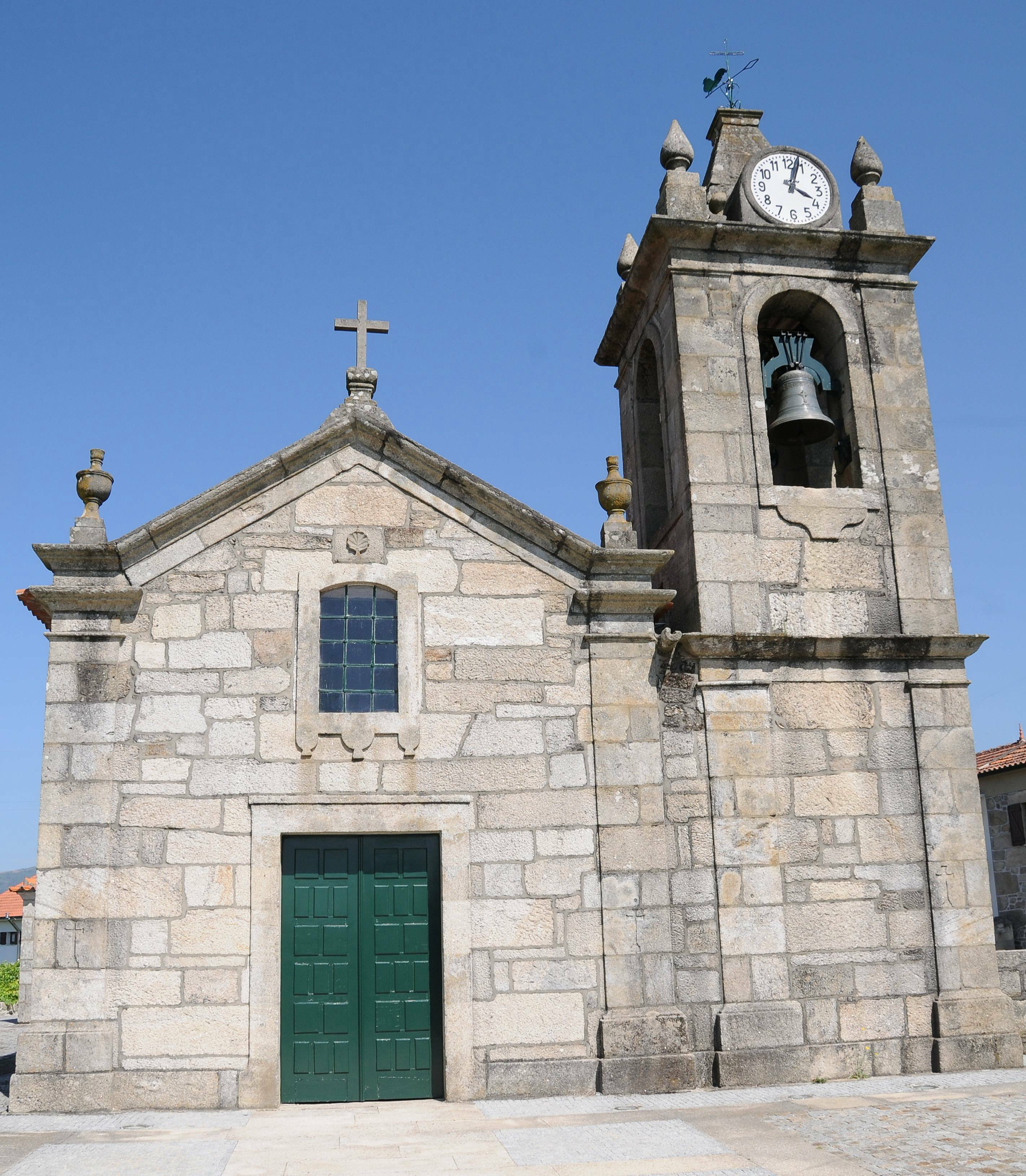
Alvaredo Church

== Architecture ==
- Chapel of São Brás (Portuguese: Capela de São Brás)
- Chapel of São João (Portuguese: Capela de São João)
- Church of São Martinho (Portuguese: Igreja Paroquial de Alvaredo/Igreja de São Martinho)
