= Church of São Salvador de Paderne =

Church in Melgaço, Viana do Castelo District, Portugal

Coordinates: 42.0896°N 8.2741°W

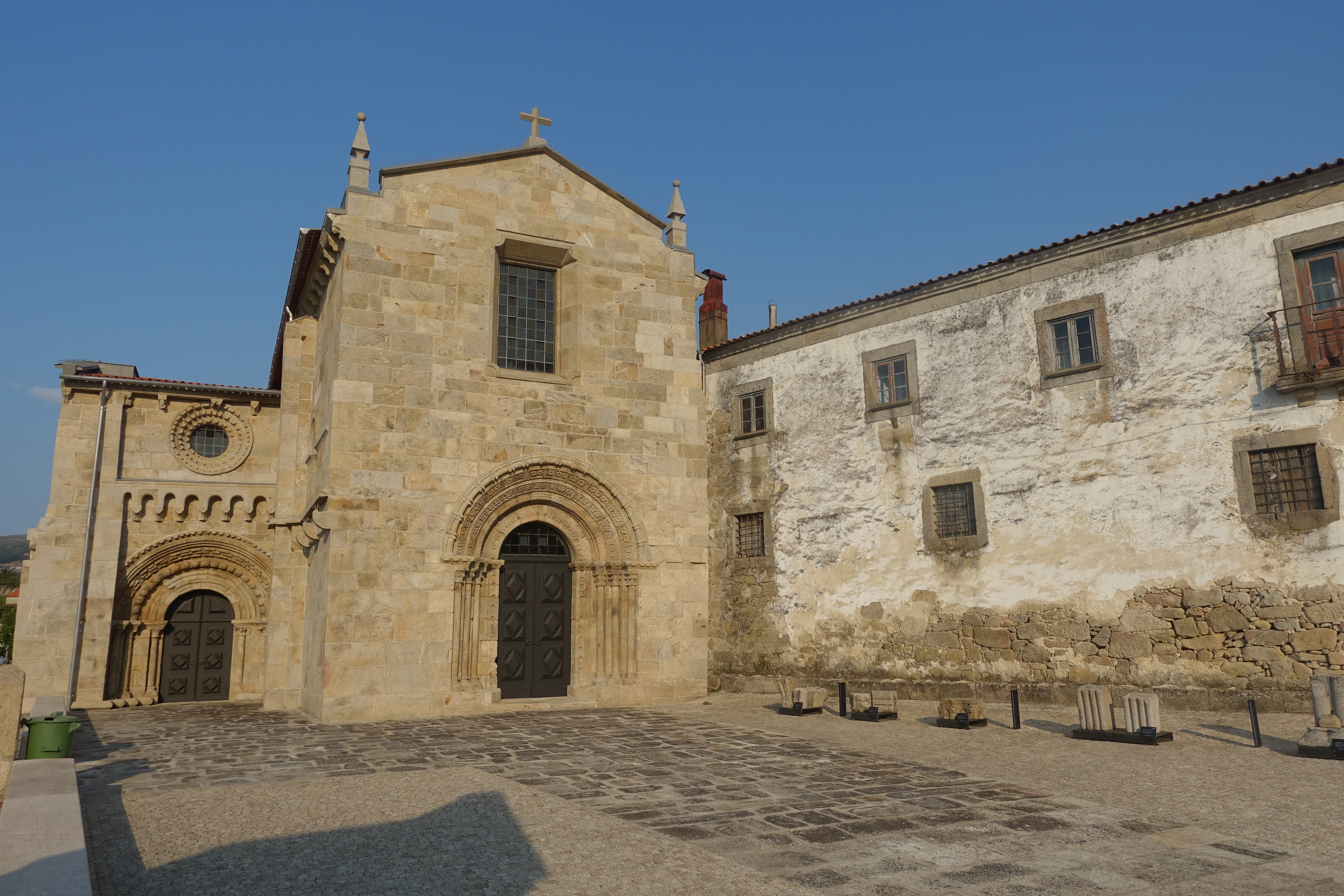
Paderne Church

The Church of São Salvador de Paderne (English: Church of the Saviour of Paderne) is a Portuguese church in Paderne, Melgaço, the northernmost municipality in Portugal.

== About ==
The origins of the church are Romanesque, but it was subjected to significant alterations in the Baroque period.

Its architectural plan consists of a Latin cross, one short nave with a large transept.

The east side of the church has three rectangular chapels.

It has been classified by IPPAR as National Monument since 1910.

== See also ==
- Portuguese Romanesque architecture
- List of churches in Portugal
