= Paderne (Melgaço) =

- Civil parish
- Location in Portugal
- Coordinates: 42.087°N 8.280°W
- Country: Portugal
- Region: Norte
- Intermunic. comm.: Alto Minho
- District: Viana do Castelo
- Municipality: Melgaço

Area
  - Total: 12.85 km^{2} (4.96 sq mi)

Population (2011)
  - Total: 1,160
  - Density: 90/km^{2} (230/sq mi)
- Time zone: UTC+00:00 (WET)
  - Summer (DST): UTC+01:00 (WEST)

Paderne is a Portuguese parish, located in the municipality of Melgaço. The population in 2011 was 1,160, in an area of 12.85 km^{2}.

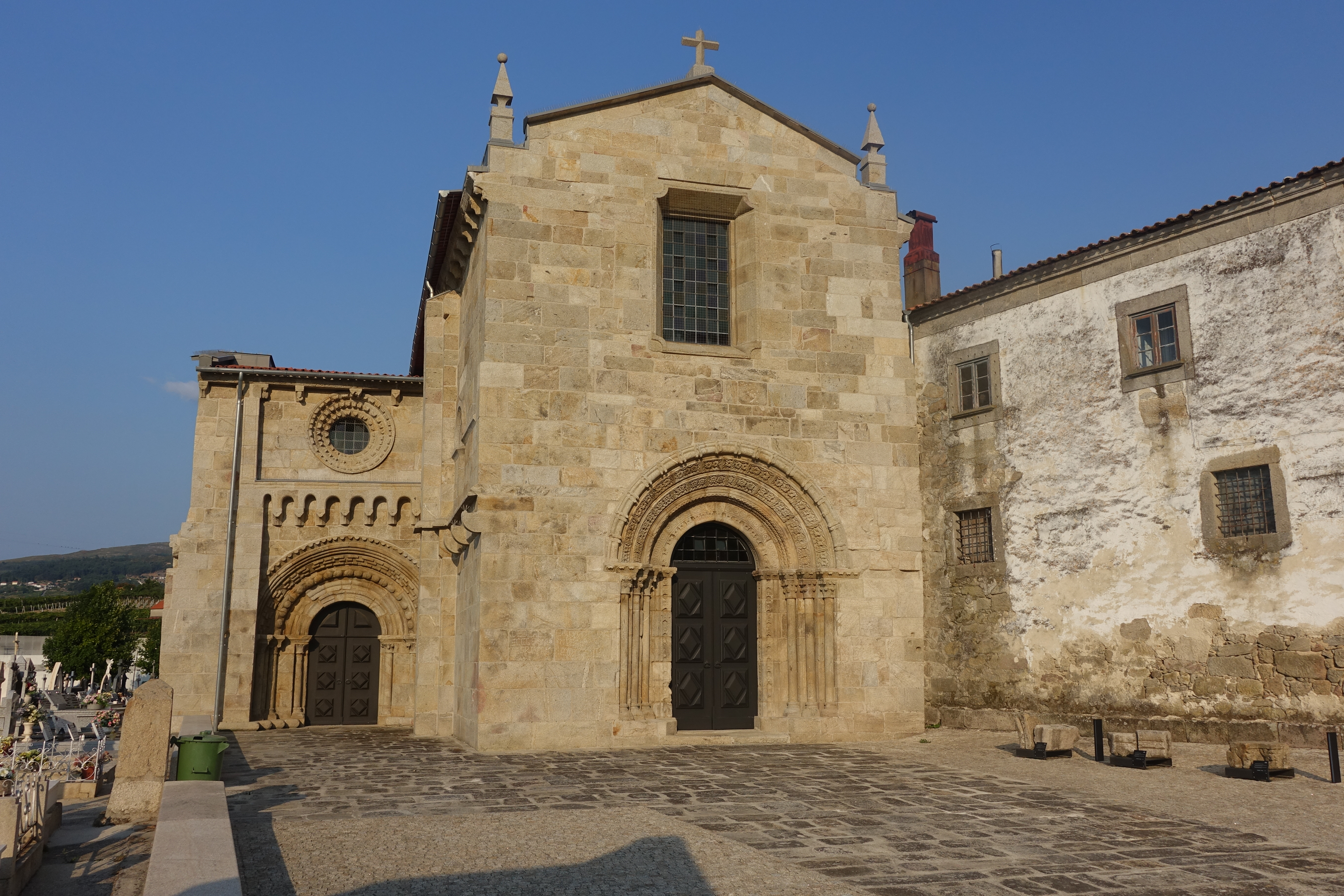
Paderne Church
