= Melgaço, Portugal =

Municipality in the district of Viana do Castelo, Portugal

Melgaço
- Municipality
- Town of Melgaço
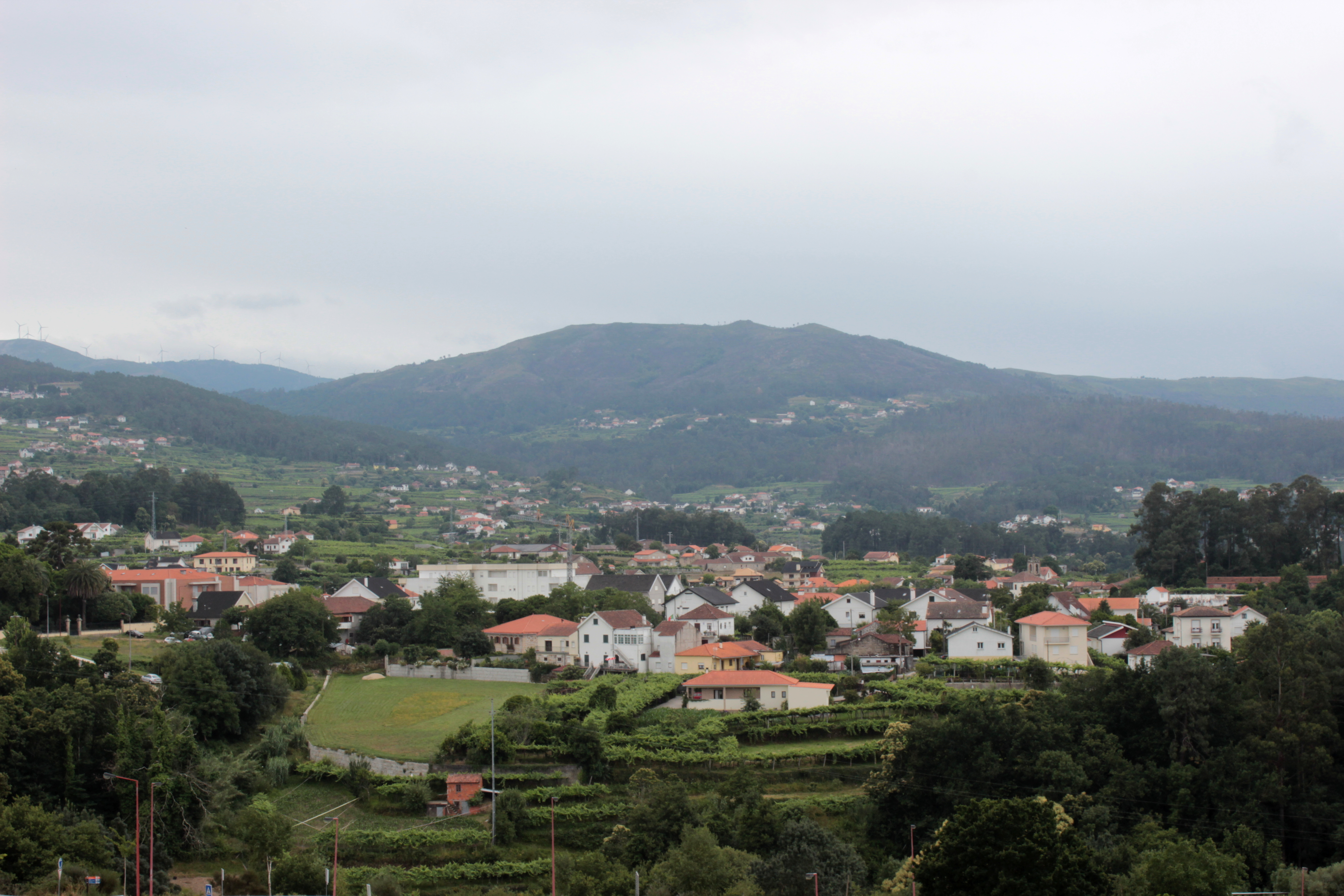
- The view of the town of Melgaço within the valleys of the Minho River

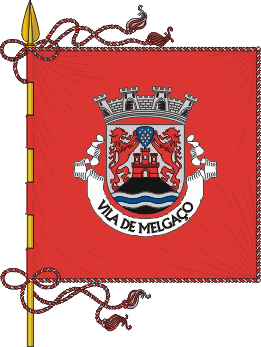
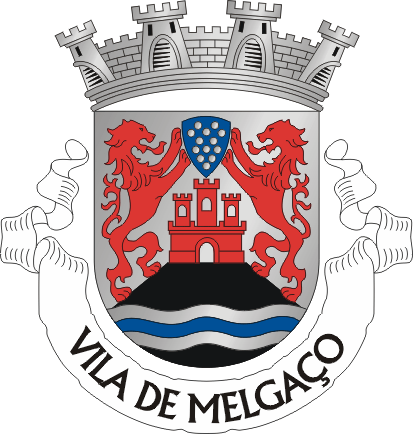
- Flag Coat of arms
- Interactive map of Melgaço
- Location in Portugal
- Coordinates: 42°06′N 8°15′W
- Country: Portugal
- Region: Norte
- Intermunic. comm.: Alto Minho
- District: Viana do Castelo
- Parishes: 13

Government
  - President: Manoel Batista (PS)

Area
  - Total: 238.25 km^{2} (91.99 sq mi)

Population (2011)
  - Total: 9,213
  - Density: 38.67/km^{2} (100.2/sq mi)
- Time zone: UTC+00:00 (WET)
  - Summer (DST): UTC+01:00 (WEST)
- Website: http://www.cm-melgaco.pt

Melgaço (Portuguese pronunciation: [mɛlˈɣasu]), officially the Town of Melgaço (Portuguese: Vila de Melgaço), is a municipality in the district of Viana do Castelo in Portugal. The population in 2011 was 9,213, in an area of 238.25 km^{2}. It is the northernmost municipality in Portugal.

The present Mayor is Manoel Batista, elected by the Socialist Party. The municipal holiday is Ascension Day.

Melgaço is certified by the EarthCheck Sustainable Destinations program.

== Geography ==
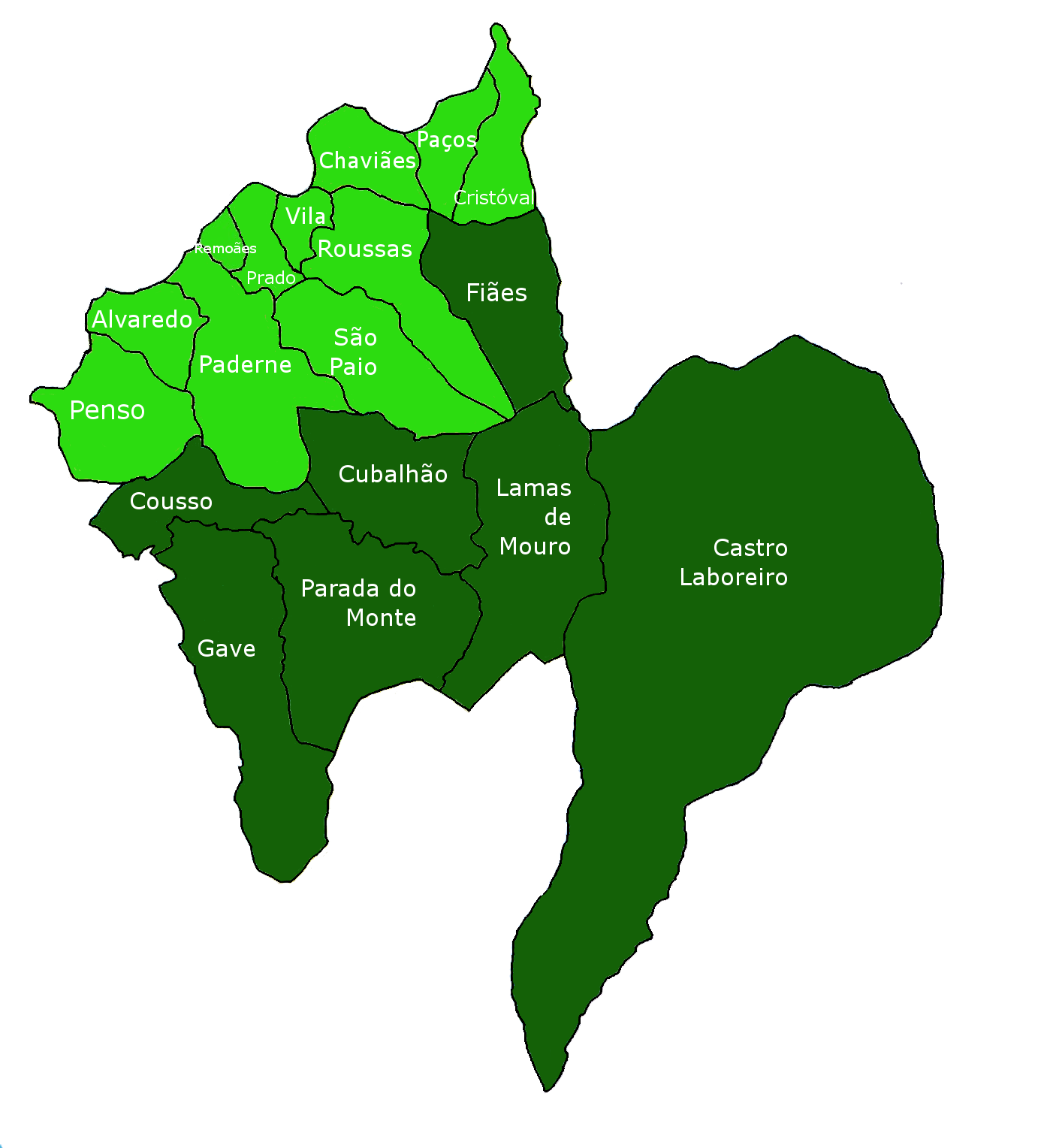
The distribution of the civil parishes of Melgaço (the mountainous parts in dark)

Administratively, the municipality is divided into 13 civil parishes:

- Alvaredo
- Castro Laboreiro e Lamas de Mouro
- Chaviães e Paços
- Cousso
- Cristoval
- Fiães
- Gave
- Paderne
- Parada do Monte e Cubalhão
- Penso
- Prado e Remoães
- São Paio
- Vila e Roussas

== Climate ==
Climate data for Portelinha, altitude: 1,018 m (3,340 ft), 1985-2021
Month	Jan	Feb	Mar	Apr	May	Jun	Jul	Aug	Sep	Oct	Nov	Dec	Year
Average precipitation mm (inches)	229.8 (9.05)	197.5 (7.78)	121.9 (4.80)	159.4 (6.28)	113.4 (4.46)	63.7 (2.51)	39.3 (1.55)	33.7 (1.33)	90.1 (3.55)	243.5 (9.59)	226.7 (8.93)	226.5 (8.92)	1,745.5 (68.75)
Source: Portuguese Environment Agency

== Architecture ==
=== Civic ===
- Bridge of Cava da Velha (Portuguese: Ponte da Cava da Velha)
- Cinema Museum of Melgaço, established by French film critic Jean-Loup Passek
- Fountain of São João (Portuguese: Fonte de São João)
- Settlement of Laboreiro (Portuguese: Povoado a SE. do Castelo de Povoado fortificado Laboreiro)
- Thermal Spa of Peso (Portuguese: Thermas do Peso)

=== Military ===
- Castle of Castro Laboreiro (Portuguese: Castelo de Castro Laboreiro ou Laboredo)
- Castle of Melgaço (Portuguese: Castelo de Melgaço e muralha/Castelo e cerca urbana de Melgaço)

=== Religious ===
- Church of the Divino Salvador de Paderne (Portuguese: Igreja e Convento de Paderne/Igreja Paroquial de Paderne/Igreja do Divino Salvador)
- Church of Santo André (Portuguese: Mosteiro de Fiães/Igreja Paroquial de Fiães/Igreja de Santo André)
- Church of São Martinho (Portuguese: Igreja Paroquial de Alvaredo/Igreja de São Martinho)
- Igreja Paroquial de Melgaço, with a famous relief of a Arganão
