= Sever =

Sever may refer to:

== Places in Portugal ==
- Sever, Santa Marta de Penaguião, a civil parish in the municipality of Santa Marta de Penaguião
- Sever, Moimenta da Beira, a civil parish in Moimenta da Beira Municipality
- Sever do Vouga Municipality, a municipality in the district of Aveiro
- Sever River, a tributary of the Tagus River

== People ==
- Sever Dron (born 1944), Romanian tennis player
- Sever Mureșan (born 1948), Romanian tennis player
- Sever Voinescu (born 1969), Romanian politician
- Henry Sever (died 1471), English divine
- Ioan Axente Sever (1821–1906), Romanian revolutionary
- J. W. Sever, the physician who characterized Sever's disease in 1912
- Savin Sever (1927–2003), Slovene architect
- Stane Sever (1914–1970), Slovenian actor
- Sever, stage name of Canadian singer Skye Sweetnam
- Agent Sever, a fictional character in the film Ballistic: Ecks vs. Sever

== Other uses ==
- Sever Hall, an academic building at Harvard University
- Sever Murmansk, a Russian football club
- Sever Pipeline, an oil product pipeline in Russia
- "Sever", a song by Porcupine Tree from the album Signify
- Sever (TV series), a Czech crime thriller television series
- Sever (transceiver) (Russian: Север), compact military short-wave transceiver (USSR, 1941)
- Sever, a borough of Košice, Slovakia

== See also ==
- Severed (disambiguation)
- Severn (disambiguation)
- Severus (disambiguation)
