= Paradinha =

- Civil parish
- Location in Portugal
- Coordinates: 41°0′34.34″N 7°36′11.04″W
- Country: Portugal
- Region: Norte
- Intermunic. comm.: Douro
- District: Viseu
- Municipality: Moimenta da Beira
- Disbanded: 2013

Area
  - Total: 5.72 km^{2} (2.21 sq mi)
- Elevation: 539 m (1,768 ft)

Population (2011)
  - Total: 125
  - Density: 22/km^{2} (57/sq mi)
- Time zone: UTC+00:00 (WET)
  - Summer (DST): UTC+01:00 (WEST)
- Postal code: 3620-410

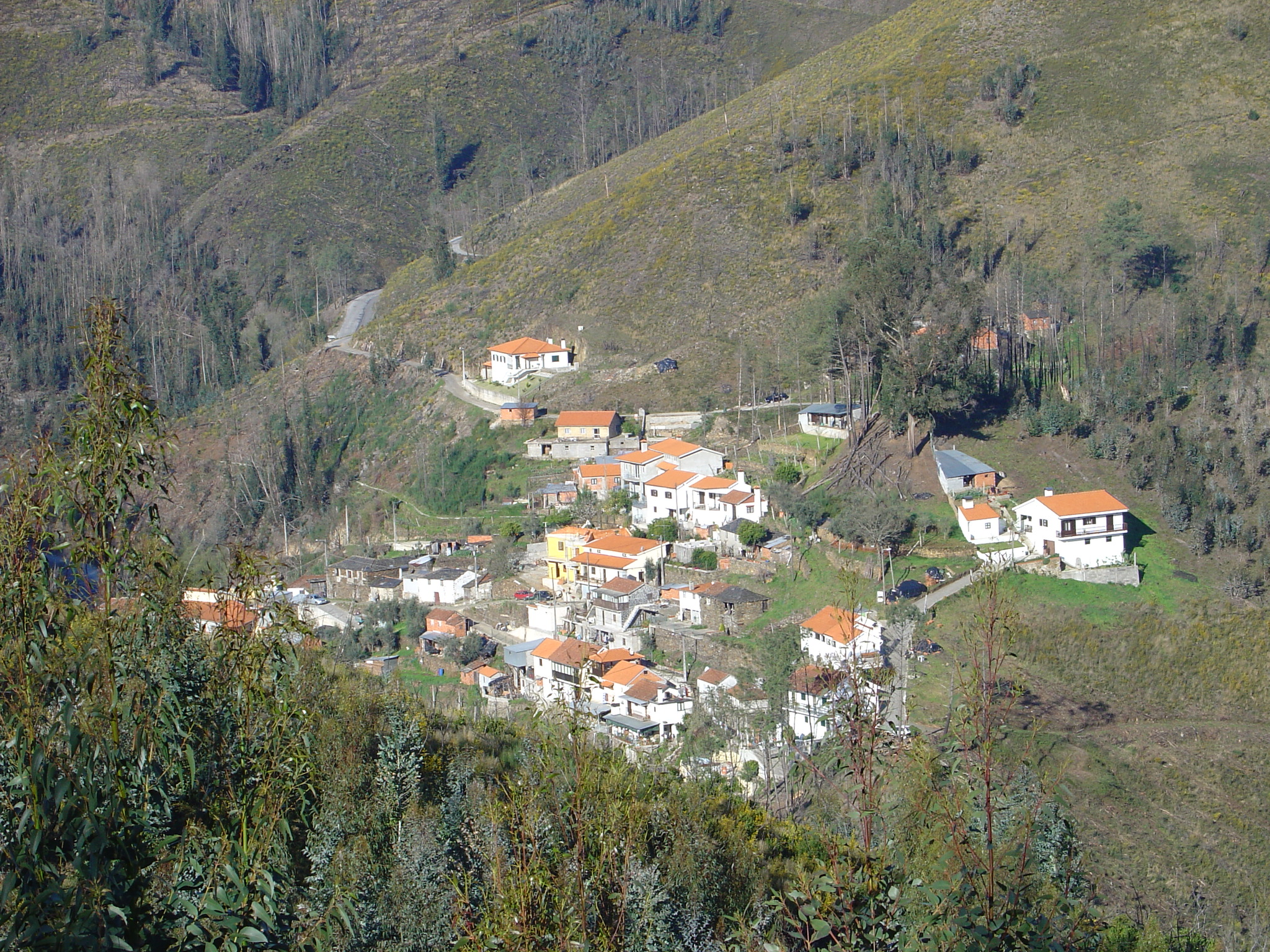
Paradinha in 2008

Paradinha is a former civil parish in the municipality (concelho) of Moimenta da Beira, Portugal. In 2013, the parish merged into the new parish Paradinha e Nagosa. The population in 2011 was 125, in an area of 5.72 km².

== History ==
Paradinha, an ancient settlement emerged from the remnants of the castro of Moreiró.

Many notable noblemen passed through this area, including the Infante John (son of Peter I of Portugal and Inês de Castro). Still, it was the Morais Sarmento family that influenced the growth of the settlement. Settling in this corner the noble family established several rich estates and concentrated their activities in the region. This auspicious plutocracy helped to establish the first roadways in the area, inaugurated in 1882. In 1859, the central government decided to extinguish the parish of Paradinha and incorporate the lands into Moimenta da Beira. The Morais Sarmento clan protested this decision and forced the government to rethink the decision, allowing the civil parish to exist during the municipal reforms.
