= Pêra Velha =

- Civil parish
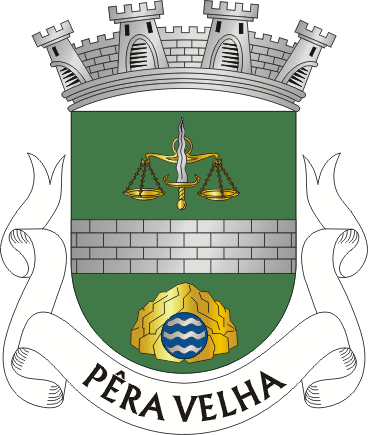
- Coat of arms

- Location in Portugal
- Coordinates: 40°55′57″N 7°39′41″W
- Country: Portugal
- Region: Norte
- Intermunic. comm.: Douro
- District: Viseu
- Municipality: Moimenta da Beira
- Disbanded: 2013

Area
  - Total: 15.73 km^{2} (6.07 sq mi)
- Elevation: 898 m (2,946 ft)

Population (2011)
  - Total: 214
  - Density: 14/km^{2} (35/sq mi)
- Time zone: UTC+00:00 (WET)
  - Summer (DST): UTC+01:00 (WEST)
- Postal code: 3620-432
- Area code: 254

Pêra Velha is a former civil parish in the municipality (concelho) of Moimenta da Beira, Portugal. In 2013, the parish merged into the new parish Pêra Velha, Aldeia de Nacomba e Ariz. The population in 2011 was 214, in an area of 15.73 km^{2}.

== History ==
Pêra Velha obtained its toponymic name from the monumental rocks that are scattered throughout its territory. Its name, literally old pear, refers to the boulders and rocks that are found in Moimenta da Beira. Its first inhabitants settled in the region during an obscure period of the Neolithic, coming from continental Europe. These were likely Celts, owing to the many prehistoric dolmens and shelters that were used as shelter. The tributaries of the Paiva and Varosa Rivers wind through the plateaus, providing irrigated fertile lands that could be used to support the early clans.

While the Romans came to occupy the valleys and floodplains, the Lusitanians continued to occupy the high-grounds and defended their territory.

Almançor's Moorish forces eventually crossed the same territory after destroying the castle of Moimenta da Beira, around the 9th century.

The Goths from Asturias eventually retook and repopulated the region, which was vaguely populated, reorganizing and forming an administrative territory (municipality) that included the villages of Peva, Ariz and Soutosa. Until 1834 it was a municipality and municipal seat, that included the parishes of Pêra Velha, Ariz and Peva.

By 1801, Pêra Velha had a population of 1136 inhabitants across 41 square kilometres (4,100 ha).

== Architecture ==
=== Prehistoric ===
- Castro of Pêra Velha (Portuguese: Castro de Pêra Velha)
- Dolmen of Lameiras (Portuguese: Anta das Lameiras), which is a set of three Neolithic dolmens

=== Religious ===
- Chapel of Senhora da Livração (Portuguese: Capela da Senhora da Livração)
- Chapel of Nossa Senhora da Fonte Santa (Portuguese: Nossa Senhora da Fonte Santa)
- Church of Pêra Velha (Portuguese: Igreja de São Miguel/Pêra Velha), an 18th-century church dedicated to the archangel Michael
