= Leomil =

Leomil may refer to:

- Leomil (Almeida), a civil parish in the municipality of Almeida
- Leomil (Moimenta da Beira), a civil parish in the municipality of Moimenta da Beira
