= Košice Children's Heritage Railway =

Heritage railway line in Slovakia

Čermeľ – Alpinka
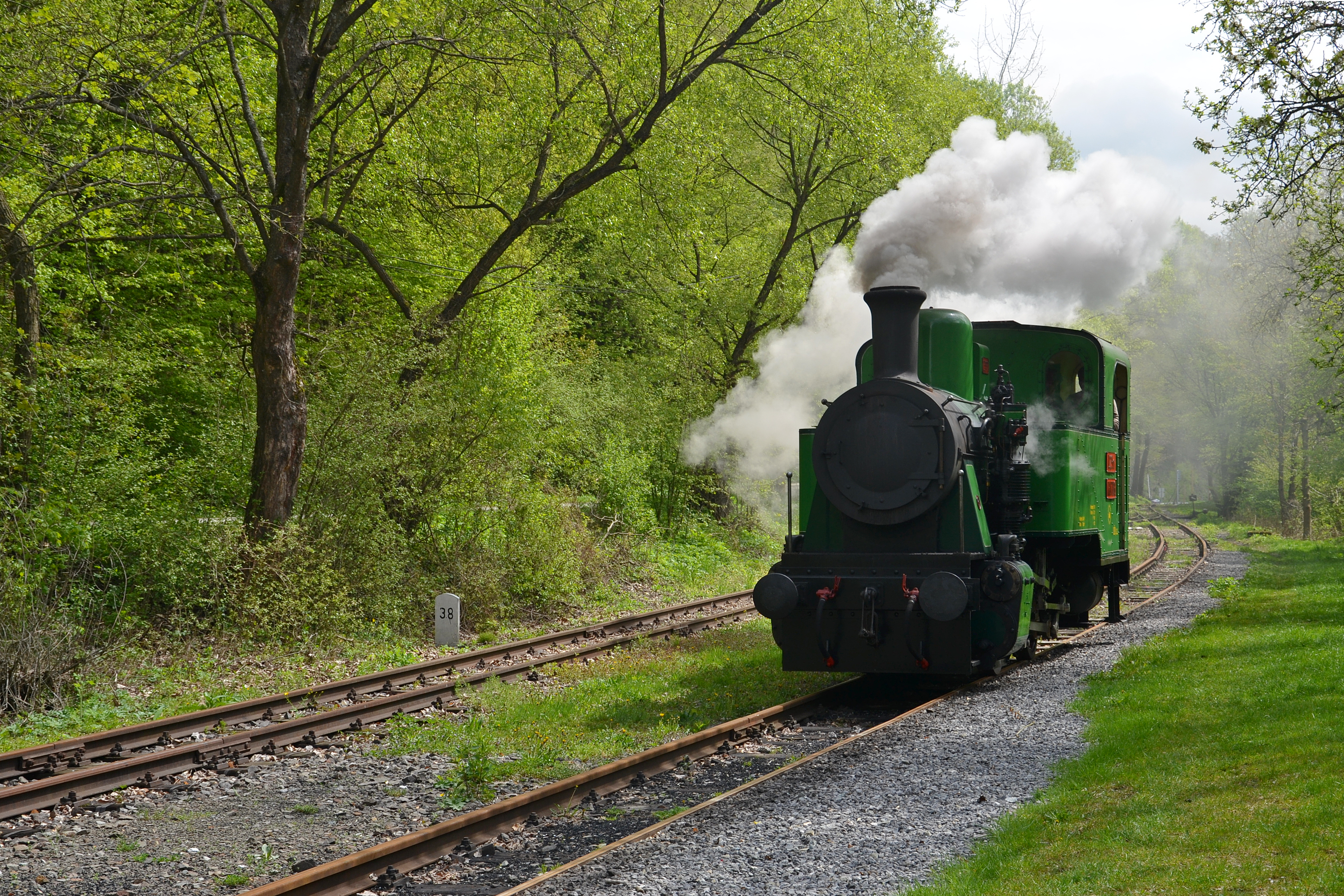
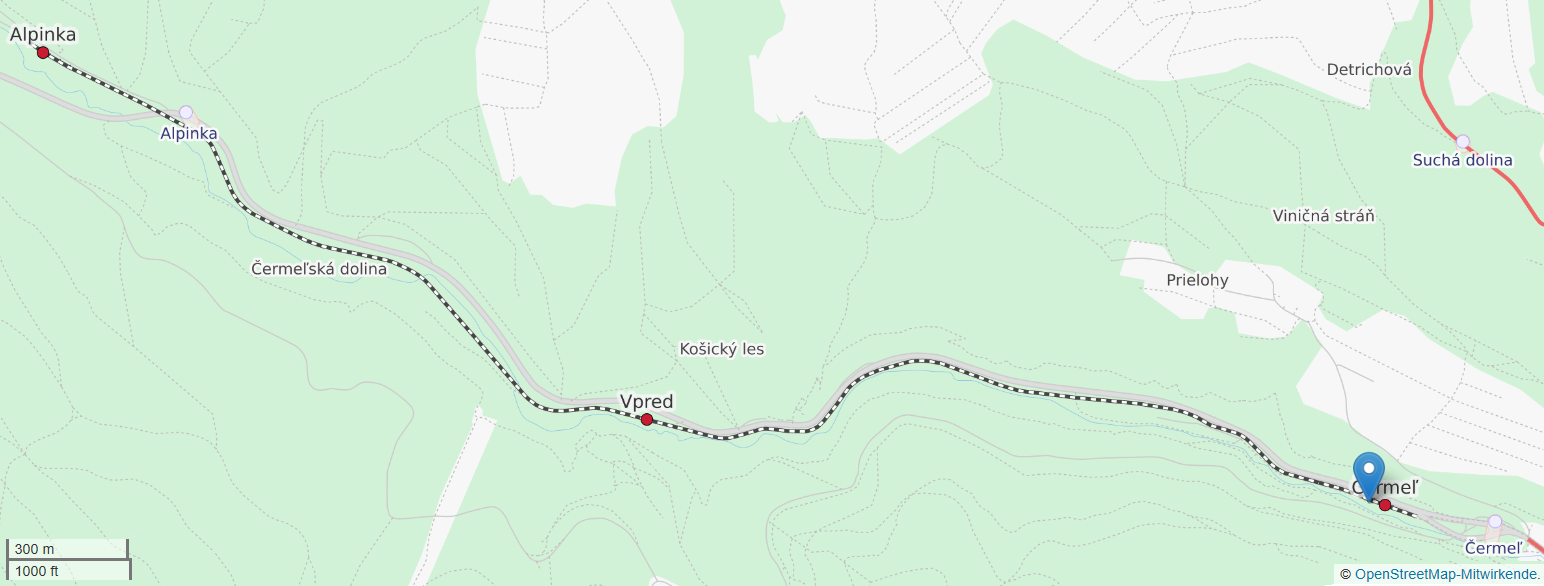
- Steam locomotive Krutwig Route

Overview
- Coordinates: 48.750033°N 21.227540°E
- Website: https://www.detskazeleznica.sk

History
- Opened: 1955

Technical
- Line length: 4.2 km (2.6 mi)
- Track gauge: 1,000 mm (3 ft 3 3/8 in)
- Operating speed: 20 km/h (12 mph) max.
- Maximum incline: 24 %

The Košice Children's Heritage Railway (Slovak: Košická detská historická železnica, KDHŽ) is a 4.2 km (2.6 mi) long single-track heritage railway with a track gauge of 1,000 mm (3 ft 3 3/8 in). The railway was opened on 20 September 1955 as a pioneer railway near Košice in Slovakia and is still in operation today. It is located in the rural part of the city's Košice-Sever borough.

The route is operated by the civic association Children's Railway Košice in close cooperation with the city of Košice and private partners. The route has three stations: Čermeľ (Čermeľ-Baránok), Vpred (Čermeľ-Vodáreň) and Alpinka (formerly Pioneer). The train journey takes about 20 minutes. The children's railway season starts traditionally on 1 May and usually lasts in late autumn. With the exception of the train driver, the ticketing manager and the children's station manager, the train is run by children under the supervision of adults, with a break from 1990 to 2011, when adults took over.^{p. 12}.

== History ==
The KDHŽ was the first pioneer railway on the territory of the former Czechoslovakia and is the only one that still exists after the division.^{p. 10} The construction took place between 1955 and 1956. Since then, four reconstructions have been carried out since 1973-1974, 1986-1987, 1990-1991 and 2006.

=== Planning and construction ===
The idea of building a railway for pioneers of elementary school age originated after the head of the Košice Railway, Vojtěch Janík, had visited a similar railway in the Soviet Union. The construction of the railway began on 17 April 1955 and was completed on 1 May 1956. The construction was done in two stages and was built manually with minimal use of building mechanisms. Some rails, points and level crossings of the former narrow-gauge railway from Hronská Dúbrava to Banská Štiavnica, which was regauged to standard gauge in 1948-1949, were to be reused. After completion and test rides of the first section between Čermeľ and Vpred stations, the steam locomotive U 35.104 Anička was inaugurated on 20 September 1955. Less than a year later, on 1 May 1956, the section from Vpred to Pionier (now Alpinka) was put into operation.^{p. 11}

=== The end of steam traction ===
The rail bus U 36.004 initially operated on the line, until it returned to its original route on 16 October 1956, where it remained until its abolition in 1965. But just before, on 10 September of the same year, the steam locomotive U 35.103 was procured, which was called Katka ,^{p. 28} and the steam locomotive U 35.104, which was called Štiavnická Anča. Both were used until 1961. The locomotive U 35.103 was handed over to the Technical Museum in Košice, by which it was scrapped despite its historical value.

=== Diesel traction ===
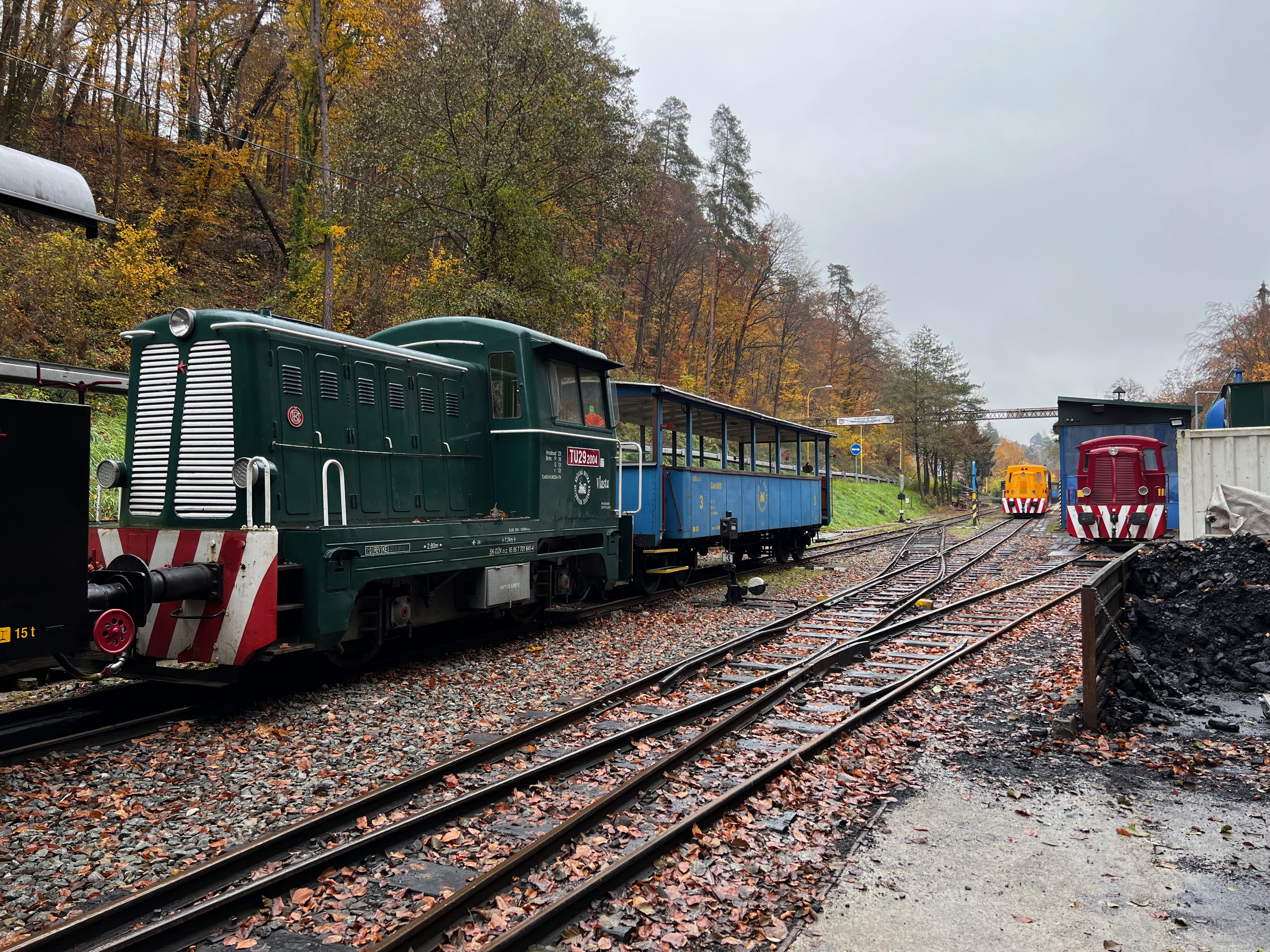
Diesel locomotives TU 29.2004 Vlasta (green), TU 29.2005 Anička (yellow) and TU 29.2003 Janka (red)

In 1962 traction on the Čermeľská Railway was taken over by two diesel locomotives, known now as TU 29.2002 (Janka) and TU 29.2003 (Danka). They were built as standard gauge locomotives around 1960 at ČKD Praha with the designations T 211.0057 (TU 29.2002) and T 211.0071 (TU 29.2003). In early 1962 they were regauged to 1,000 millimetres (39 in) gauge, given the designations T 29.002 and T 29.003 and were used in Nymburk. In 1965 they were renumbered to TU 29.0002 and TU 29.0003. Originally, they were called Katka and Vlasta, and TU 29.2003 was called temporarily Vlasta. In early 1983, the original Tatra 111 A engines were replaced by the newer Tatra 930 engines, after which their numbers changed to TU 29.2002 and TU 29.2003 and renamed Janka and Danka, after the twins of Mária Ďuríčková's book. Due to the change in the numbering of rail vehicles in 1988, they were renumbered to as 701.952-4 (Janka) and 701.953-2 (Danka).^{p. 30-31}

=== Difficult times since 1970 ===
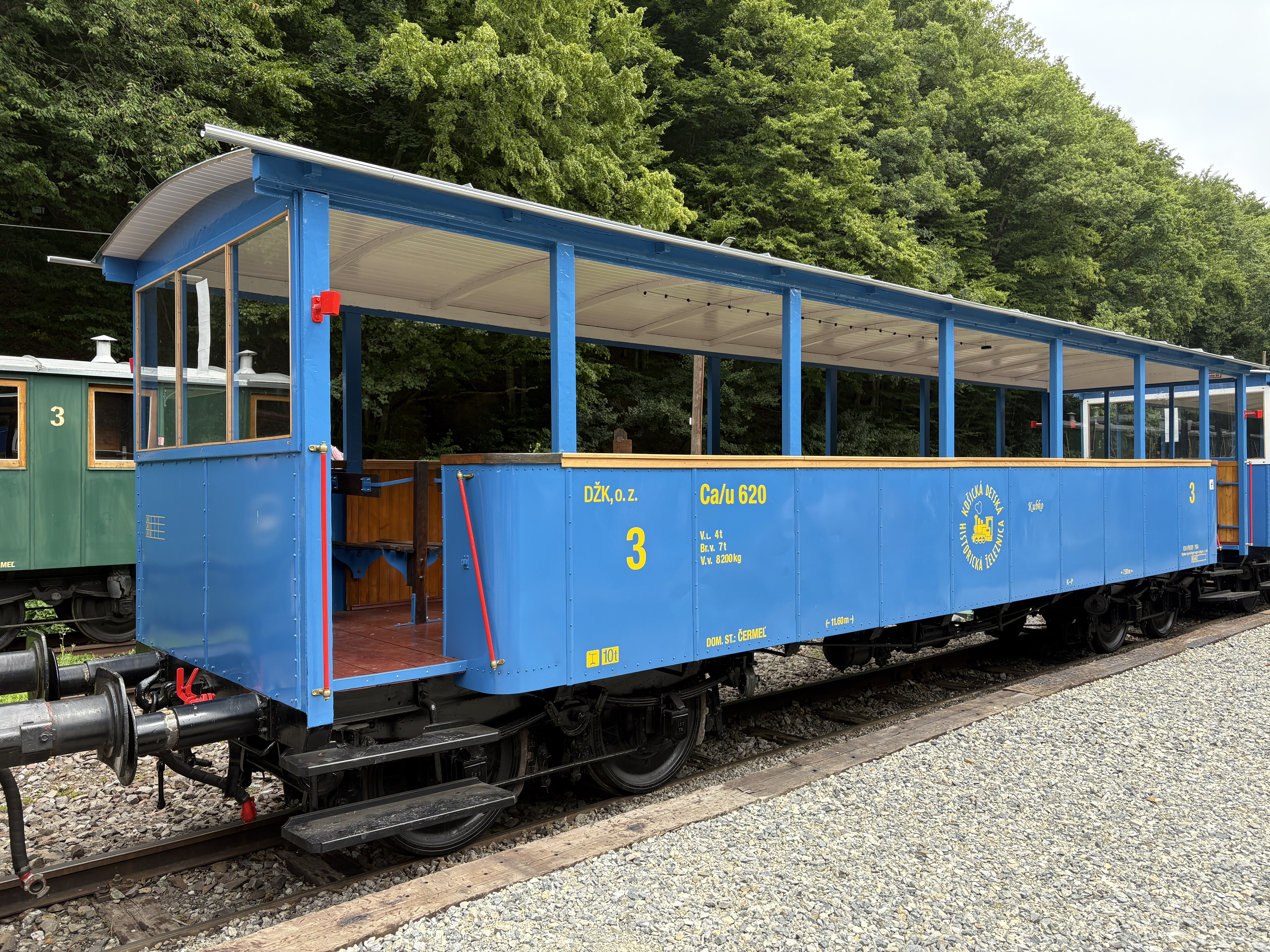
Open summer car Ca/u 620 Kubko

In 1973, traffic on the Čermelska Railway was temporarily suspended due to the poor condition of the line, but eventually the railway was rebuilt due to the great public interest. Some of the sleepers, rails and gravel beds have been replaced. Operation on the reconstructed line was resumed two years later.^{p. 18, 27} A further reconstruction of the route took place between 1986 and 1987, when a large part of the tracks between the stations was exchanged. During this reconstruction, a tamping machine was borrowed from the Tatra Electric Railway.^{p. 18, 27} In addition to track maintenance, the railroad also required regular maintenance of the two locomotives to maintain seasonal operation. Occasionally, the season had to be interrupted or even terminated prematurely due to malfunctions of both vehicles. After the end of the season they were always transported to the depot in Košice, where they were regularly maintained.^{p. 30-31}

=== Changes and stagnation since 1990, return to steam operation ===
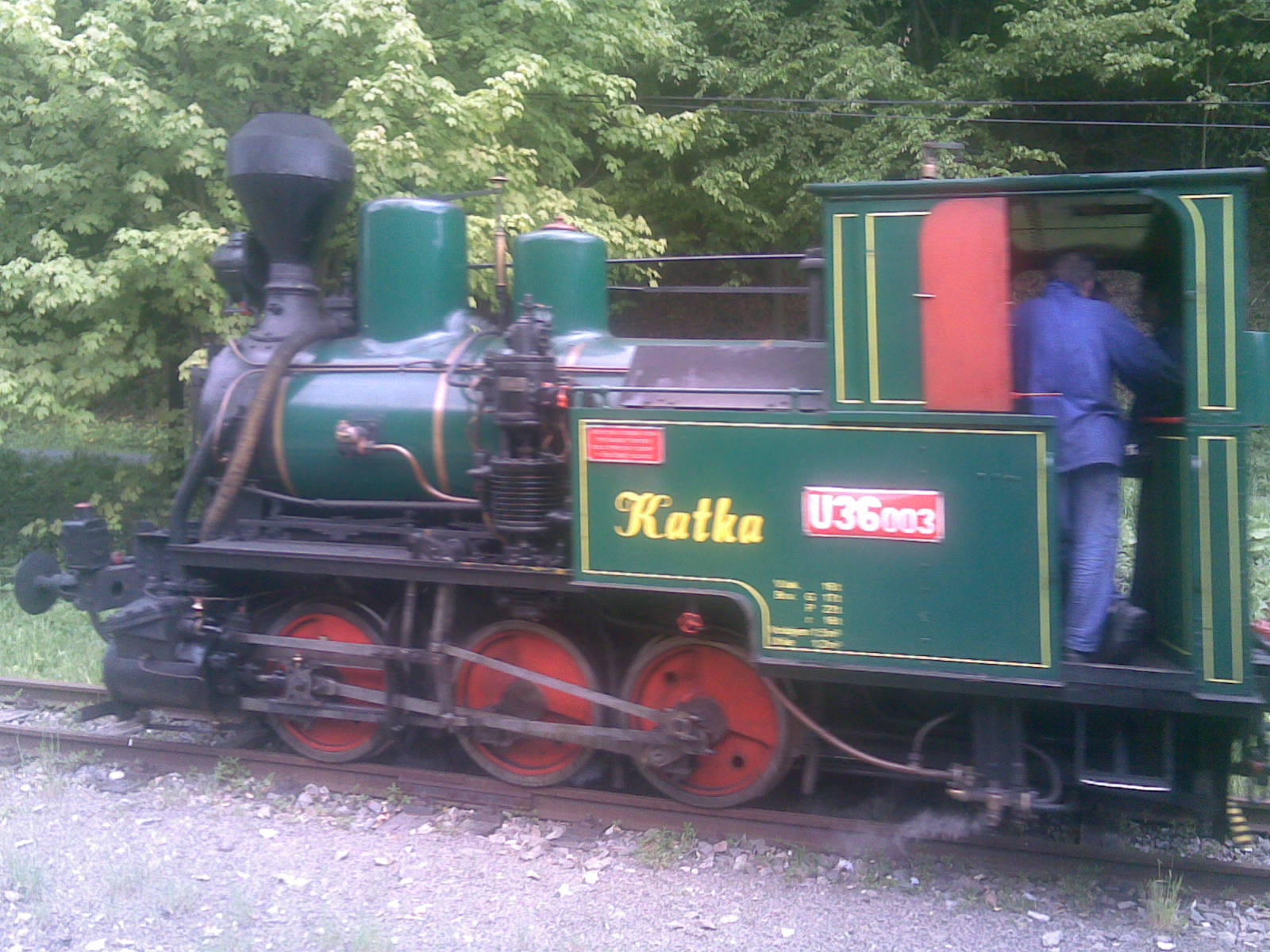
The steam locomotive U 36.003 Katka, which was procured in 1991, is the oldest functioning steam locomotive in Slovakia and the symbol of the KDHŽ

Due to the political changes after the division of Czechoslovakia in late 1989, the name Pioneer Railway was first changed to Youth Railway and later to Children's Railway. For the same reason Pioneer was renamed Alpinka. This name had been used in the past for the region.^{p. 18, 25} Due to the disappearance of the pioneering organization and stricter railway regulations, the operation of ČSD employees was taken over by ŽSR. In the years 1990 to 1991, the track system in Alpinka was rebuilt. During this reconstruction, the points that were no longer needed were dismantled. At about the same time, the original station buildings at all three stations were demolished. Subsequently new buildings were erected at the Vpred and Alpinka stations.^{p. 18,27} In 1991, the steam locomotive U 36.003 Katka was put back into operation after a major overhaul. In the same year, the diesel locomotive 29.2002 Janka was stored in the depot of the ŽSR in Košice, the locomotive TU 29.2003 Danka served as operational support in case of disruption of the steam locomotive Katka.^{p. 30-31} Since then, the traffic of the children's railway stagnates. On several occasions, it was threatened by decommissioning In 2001 there was a change in the operation of the Children's Railway in connection with the splitting of the ŽSR into three separate operations. Since then, the line has been under the management of ŽSR, the operation has been taken over by the Železničná spoločnosť Slovensko, and the regular maintenance of the railway has been carried out by the Dopravný podnik mesta Košice (Košice Transit Company).^{p. 59} In 2006 parts of the track had to be rebuilt due to extensive flood damage. The tamping machine from TEZ was used again for this repair. The work could be completed before the start of the season, and so the children's railway celebrated its 50th anniversary.

== Current operation ==
In 2012, the operation of the railway was taken over by the Košice Children's Railway Coalition, which wanted to revitalize the route and at the same time set a new cultural center in the framework of the Košice - European Capital of Culture 2013 project. As a result, the official name changed again to Košická detská historická železnica (Košice Historical Children's Railway). The association was able to resume childcare services, extend the seasonal operation into late autumn and organize a series of cultural events that took place for the first time in 2012, such as the July Theater Saturdays, Summer Cinema or fall events. For the Nikolausfahrten 2012, which took place for the first time in the history of the railway, the diesel locomotive TU 29.2002 Janka was brought back on the track. The railway is currently running from the last weekend in April to the beginning of November, but traffic is expected to be extended throughout the year. The season is usually formally opened on 1 May by the mayor.

== Rolling stock ==
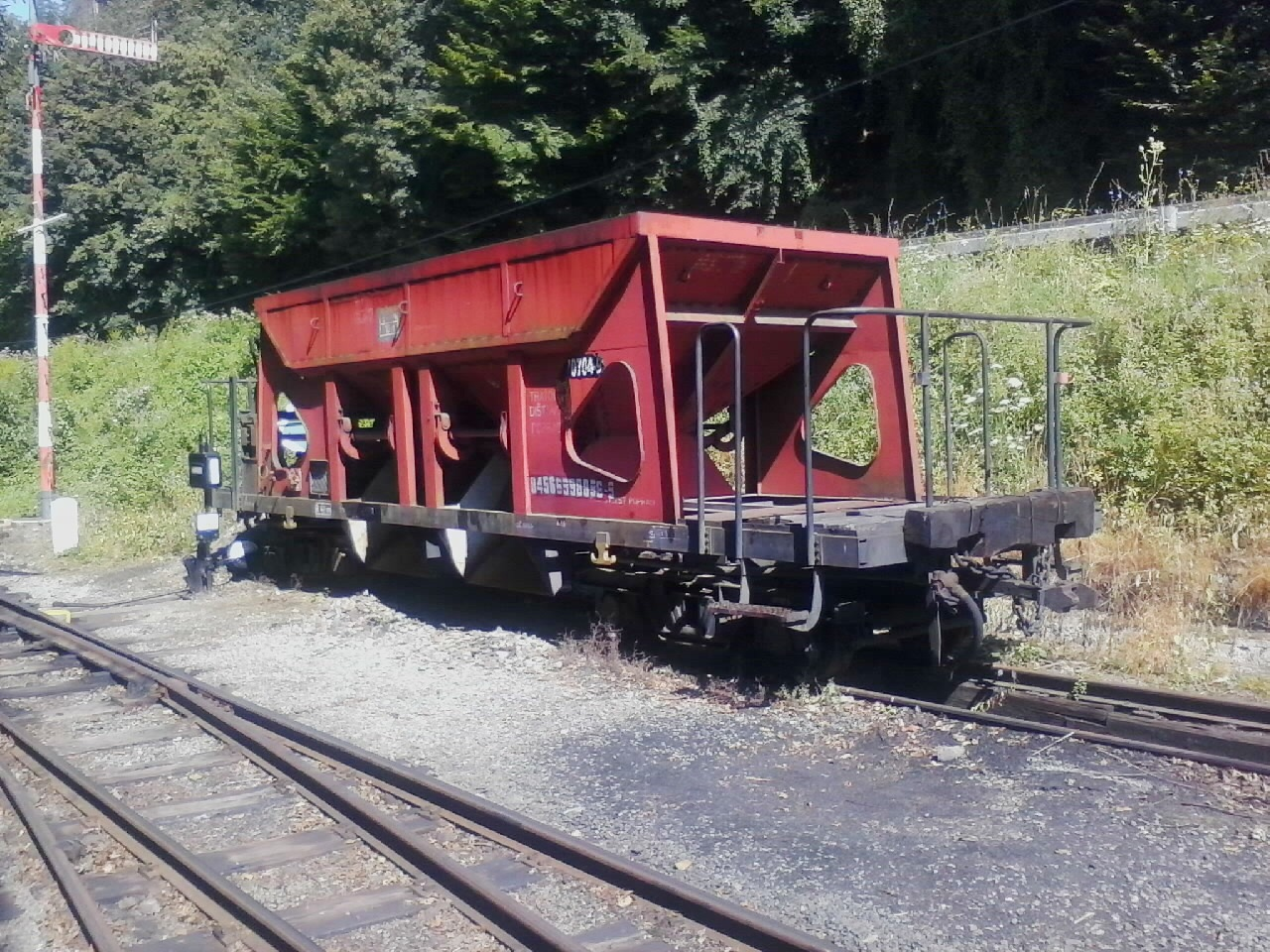
Ballast hopper car

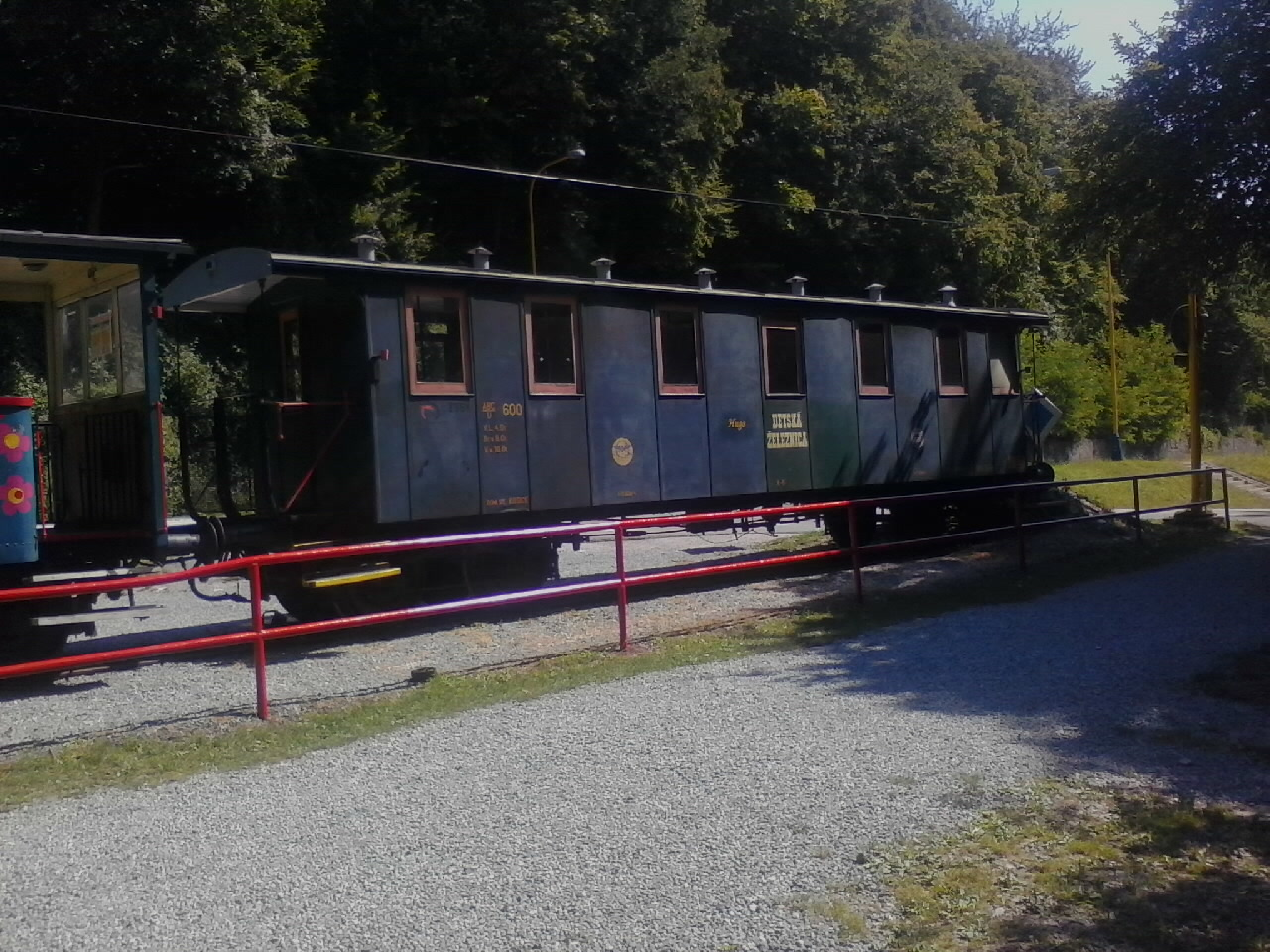
Historic passenger car ABC / u 600

The rolling stock consists of:

- Locomotives
  - U 36.003 - Katka
  - U 29.101 - Krutwig
  - TU 29.2002 - Janka
  - TU 29.2003 - Danka
  - TU 29.2004 - Vlasta
  - TU 29.2005 - Anička
- Carriages
  - 5 open passenger cars
  - 4 covered passenger cars
  - 2 service cars
  - 2 flat cars
  - 1 hopper car

In 1994, the steam locomotive U 36.003 Katka and all cars (with the exception of the gravel hopper car) were registered in the Central List of Cultural Monuments of the Slovak Republic. This happened after an unknown culprit had burnt down the ABC / u 600 car on 17 January 1993, but it could be reconstructed despite severe damage and has been used again since 1996 in the children's railway. This car is special, because it has three compartments with different classes.^{p. 48-49}

=== Locomotives ===
There are currently two steam locomotives U 36.003 Katka and U 29.101 Krutwig and four diesel locomotives TU 29.2002 Janka, TU 29.2003 Danka, TU 29.2004 Vlasta and TU 29.2005 Anička. The steam locomotive U 36.003 Katka has been in operation on the children's railway since 1991. It is the oldest functioning steam locomotive in the territory of the former Czechoslovakia. It was built in 1884 for the narrow gauge line from Gelnica via Mníšek nad Hnilcom to Smolník, where it operated until its abolition in 1965, with the exception of the period from 1938 to 1949, when she was running on the Hronská Breznica - Banská Štiavnica route. Since 1974 it was exhibited on a plinth in Spišská Nová Ves. In 1990 it was transported to České Velenice, where it was reconstructed to work on the children's railway.^{p. 32-33} However the locomotive experienced frequent malfunctions in the 1990s. For example, in 1997 the boiler had to be transported again to České Velenice due to the poor technical condition. In 1999, on the occasion of the 50th anniversary of the Children's Railway, it was exhibited at the Banská Štiavnica railway station. A similar U 36.0 class locomotive (U 36.004) was used in 1955-1956 on the railway.

Locomotive class ČKD 900 BS 200 Krutwig, which was mainly used in lignite mining and was located in the Museum of Old Machines in Žamberk, was restored in 2016 and entered service as U 29.101.

Locomotive	Name	Type	Year of construction	Entered service on KDHŽ
Steam
U 36.003	Katka	Hagans Klb-L Cn2t	1884	1991
U 29.101	Krutwig	ČKD 900 BS 200	1957	2016
Diesel
TU 29.2002	Janka	ČKD T 211.1	1959	1962
TU 29.2003	Danka	ČKD T 211.1	1960	1962
TU 29.2004	Vlasta	ČKD T 211.1	1958	2018
TU 29.2005	Anička	ČKD T 212.0	1967	2022

=== Carriages ===
There are 5 open cars, 4 covered cars and 3 freight cars. Since 25 May 2013, the passenger cars also carry names. Wagon names were introduced during a special event with a theatrical performance for children specially prepared for the occasion.

Three of the open summer cars were built in 1955 in Žilina by the conversion of older cars from the early 20th century. Ca/u 620 was adapted for the transport of bicycles and pushchairs in 2013.

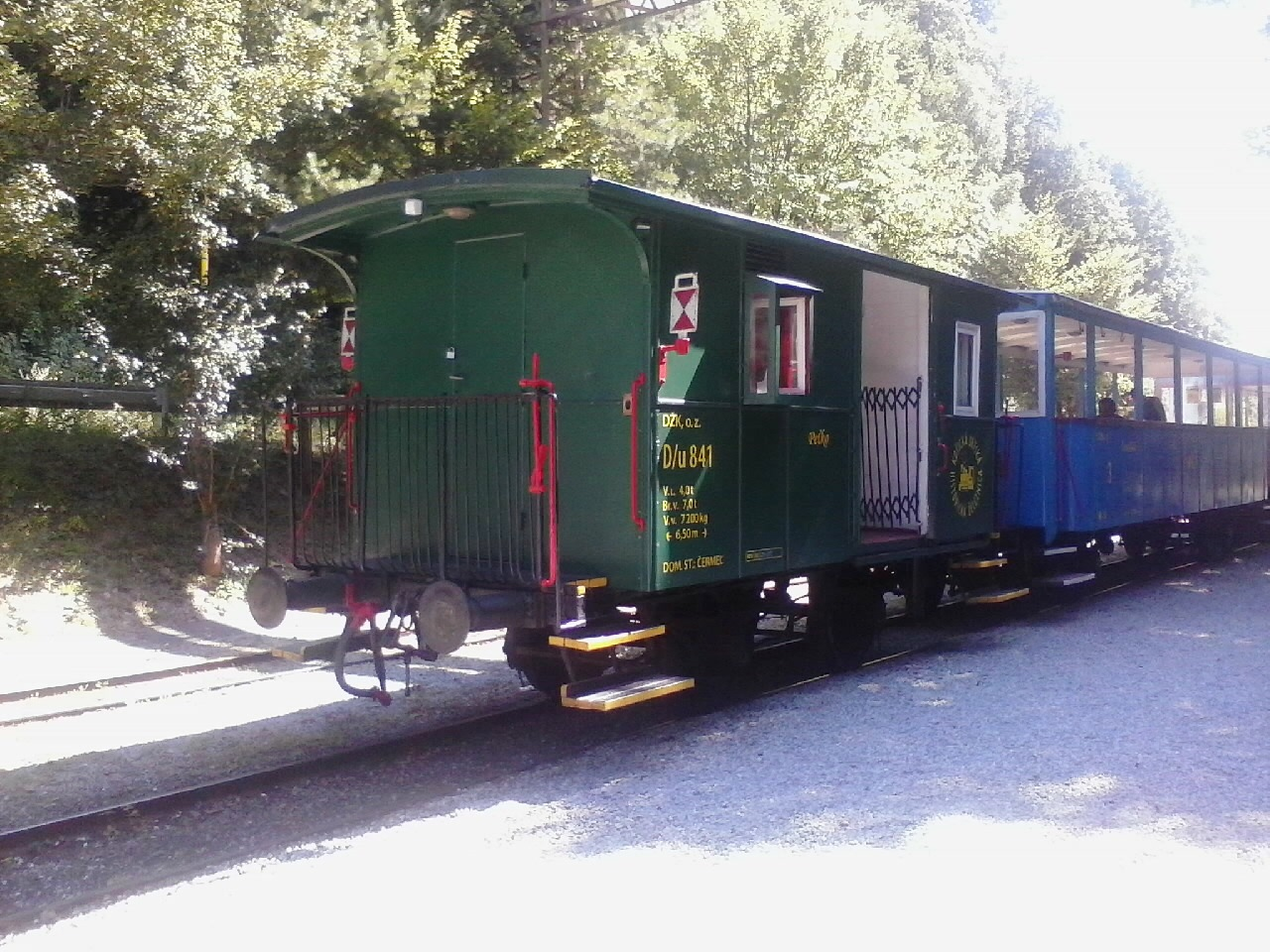
The historic D/u 841 car is the longest-serving car in Slovakia

The car D/u 841 is the oldest railway carriage in Slovakia remaining in service. It was built in 1886 and arrived at the track in 1955. The second service car D/u 840, which arrived in Košice a few years later, was restored and returned to service in 2017.^{p. 241-244}

Carriage	Name	Year of construction	Year of conversion	Comment
ABC/u 600	Hugo	1913	1996	After burning down, rebuilt with first, second and third class compartments.
Bt 132		1966	2018	Acquired by KDHŽ in 2018 from the Aigle–Ollon–Monthey–Champéry railway.
Bt 134		1966	2018	Acquired by KDHŽ in 2018 from the Aigle–Ollon–Monthey–Champéry railway.
Ca/u 601	Hubert	1913		
Ca/u 610	Maťko	1904	1955	Open car, named after valasi shepherds from the TV series Pásli ovce valasi
Ca/u 620	Kubko	1913	1955	Open car, named after a valasi shepherds from the TV series Pásli ovce valasi
Ca/u 621	Samko	1910	1955	Open car.
Ca/u Xak 9317	Nagybörzsöny	1906	2022	Open car
Ca/u Xak 9318	Abov	1906	2022	Open car
D/u 840	Janko	1913		
D/u 841	Peťko	1886		
