= Paradinha e Nagosa =

- Civil parish
- Location in Portugal
- Coordinates: 41.007°N 7.605°W
- Country: Portugal
- Region: Norte
- Intermunic. comm.: Douro
- District: Viseu
- Municipality: Moimenta da Beira

Area
  - Total: 12.09 km^{2} (4.67 sq mi)

Population (2011)
  - Total: 236
  - Density: 20/km^{2} (51/sq mi)
- Time zone: UTC+00:00 (WET)
  - Summer (DST): UTC+01:00 (WEST)

Paradinha e Nagosa is a civil parish in the municipality of Moimenta da Beira, northern Portugal. It was formed in 2013 by the merger of the former parishes Paradinha and Nagosa. The population in 2011 was 236, in an area of 12.09 km^{2}.
