= Severed =

Severed may refer to:

- Severed, novel by Simon Kernick 2007
- Severed, novel by Scott Snyder 2012
- Severed (film) by Carl Bessai 2005 Canadian zombie horror film
- Severed (video game)
- "Severed", song by Mudvayne from L.D. 50 2000
- "Severed", song by Chimaira from Pass Out of Existence, 2001
- Severed: The True Story of the Black Dahlia Murder, a 1994 book by John Gilmore

== See also ==
- Sever (disambiguation)
