= Pêra Velha, Aldeia de Nacomba e Ariz =

- Civil parish
- Location in Portugal
- Coordinates: 40.921°N 7.639°W
- Country: Portugal
- Region: Norte
- Intermunic. comm.: Douro
- District: Viseu
- Municipality: Moimenta da Beira

Area
  - Total: 29.17 km^{2} (11.26 sq mi)

Population (2011)
  - Total: 428
  - Density: 15/km^{2} (38/sq mi)
- Time zone: UTC+00:00 (WET)
  - Summer (DST): UTC+01:00 (WEST)

Pêra Velha, Aldeia de Nacomba e Ariz is a civil parish in the municipality of Moimenta da Beira, northern Portugal. It was formed in 2013 by the merger of the former parishes Pêra Velha, Aldeia de Nacomba and Ariz. The population in 2011 was 428, in an area of 29.17 km^{2}.
