= Rua (Moimenta da Beira) =

- Civil parish
- Location in Portugal
- Coordinates: 40.946°N 7.573°W
- Country: Portugal
- Region: Norte
- Intermunic. comm.: Douro
- District: Viseu
- Municipality: Moimenta da Beira

Area
  - Total: 9.67 km^{2} (3.73 sq mi)

Population (2011)
  - Total: 601
  - Density: 62.2/km^{2} (161/sq mi)
- Time zone: UTC+00:00 (WET)
  - Summer (DST): UTC+01:00 (WEST)

Rua is a Portuguese parish, located in the municipality of Moimenta da Beira. The population in 2011 was 601, in an area of 9.67 km^{2}. Until the late 19th century, the town was the most important in the municipality.
