= Košice-Sever =

Košice-North Košice-Sever
- Borough
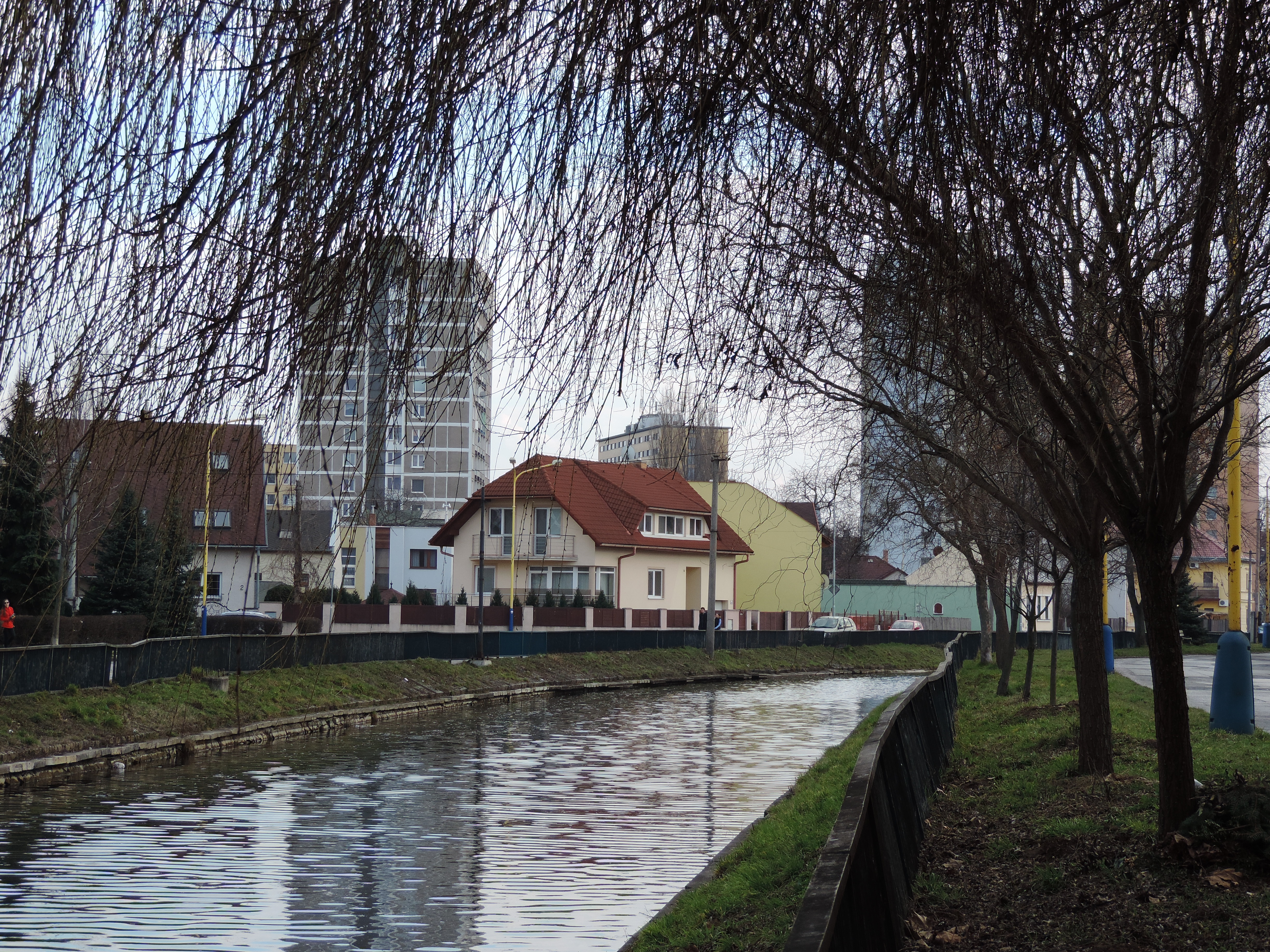
- Tyršovo nábrežie (urban part of Košice-Sever)

- Flag Coat of arms

- Location of Košice-Sever in Slovakia
- Country: Slovakia
- Region: Košice
- District: Košice I
- Locality: 1364 (first written record)

Area
  - Total: 54.79 km^{2} (21.15 sq mi)
- Elevation: 260 m (850 ft)

Population (2025)
  - Total: 18,073

Population by ethnicity (2011)
  - Slovak: 72.1%
  - Hungarian: 3.3%
  - Czech: 0.8%
  - Rusyn: 0.5%
  - Roma: 0.5%
  - Other: 1.2%
  - Unreported: 21.6%

Population by religion (2011)
  - Roman Catholic: 40.6%
  - Greek Catholic: 5.4%
  - Lutheran: 3.9%
  - Calvinist: 2.2%
  - Orthodox: 0.9%
  - Other: 1.8%
  - Non-religious: 18.3%
  - Unreported: 26.9%
- Time zone: UTC+1 (CET)
  - Summer (DST): UTC+2 (CEST)
- Postal code: 04013
- Area code: +421-55
- Vehicle registration plate (until 2022): KE
- Website: www.kosicesever.sk

Košice-Sever (English: Košice-North, Hungarian: Kassa-Észak) is a borough (city ward) of Košice, Slovakia. Located in the Košice I district, it lies at an altitude of roughly 260 metres (850 ft) above sea level. It is one of the more populous boroughs of the city, as well as the largest of all 22 boroughs, which contributes to its low overall population density. Along with the neighbouring borough of Kavečany, Košice-Sever is the most popular recreational area in the city, frequented particularly by locals, but also visitors.

== Statistics ==
- Area: 54.58 square kilometres (21.07 sq mi)
- Population: 20,281 (December 2017)
- Density of population: 370/km² (December 2017)
- District: Košice I
- Mayor: František Ténar (as of 2018 elections)

== Geography ==
The municipality lies at an altitude of 260 metres (850 ft) and covers an area of 54.79 km^{2} (21.15 sq mi) (2025).

== Population ==
Population statistic (10 years)
Year	1995	2005	2015	2025
Count	0	19,885	20,143	18,073
Difference		–	+1.29%	−10.27%

Population statistic
Year	2024	2025
Count	18,237	18,073
Difference		−0.89%

It has a population of 18,073 people (31 December 2025).

=== Ethnicity ===
Census 2021 (1+%)
Ethnicity	Number	Fraction
Slovak	16,597	86.79%
Not found out	1651	8.63%
Hungarian	821	4.29%
Rusyn	281	1.46%
Czech	251	1.31%
Total	19,123	

In year 2021 was 19,123 people by ethnicity 16,597 as Slovak, 1651 as Not found out, 821 as Hungarian, 281 as Rusyn, 251 as Czech, 154 as Other, 92 as Romani, 77 as German, 73 as Ukrainian, 35 as Russian, 26 as Jewish, 21 as Polish, 13 as Moravian, 10 as Serbian, 9 as Bulgarian, 8 as Greek, 7 as French, 6 as Italian, 5 as English, 4 as Canadian, 3 as Chinese, 3 as Irish, 3 as Croatian, 2 as Turkish, 2 as Austrian, 2 as Albanian, 1 as Vietnamese, 1 as Romanian and 1 as Korean.

Note on population: The difference values of population numbers in the table "Population statistic" and in the sections "Ethnicity" & "Religion" is caused by the use of various statistical methods.

=== Religion ===
Census 2021 (1+%)
Religion	Number	Fraction
Roman Catholic Church	7880	41.21%
None	6224	32.55%
Not found out	2012	10.52%
Greek Catholic Church	1159	6.06%
Evangelical Church	757	3.96%
Calvinist Church	388	2.03%
Eastern Orthodox Church	221	1.16%
Total	19,123	

In year 2021 was 19,123 people by religion 7880 from Roman Catholic Church, 6224 from None, 2012 from Not found out, 1159 from Greek Catholic Church, 757 from Evangelical Church, 388 from Calvinist Church, 221 from Eastern Orthodox Church, 96 from Other, 55 from Ad hoc movements, 54 from Other and not ascertained christian church, 44 from Jehovah's Witnesses, 43 from Buddhism, 43 from Apostolic Church, 29 from Islam, 27 from Jewish community, 20 from Christian Congregations in Slovakia, 18 from Paganism and natural spirituality, 14 from Baptists Church, 12 from Church of the Brethren, 10 from United Methodist Church, 8 from Seventh-day Adventist Church, 4 from Hinduism, 2 from Old Catholic Church, 1 from New Apostolic Church, 1 from Czechoslovak Hussite Church and 1 from Bahá'i Community.

== Tourist attractions ==
- Hradová hill
  - Košice Castle
  - Hradová observation tower
- Bankov recreational area
- Jahodná recreational area
- Anička pond and recreational area
- Narrow-gauge heritage railway Čermeľská železnica
  (also Detská železnica, "Children's Railroad")
- Alpinka golf course
- Hiking trails
- Cycling trails

== Gallery ==
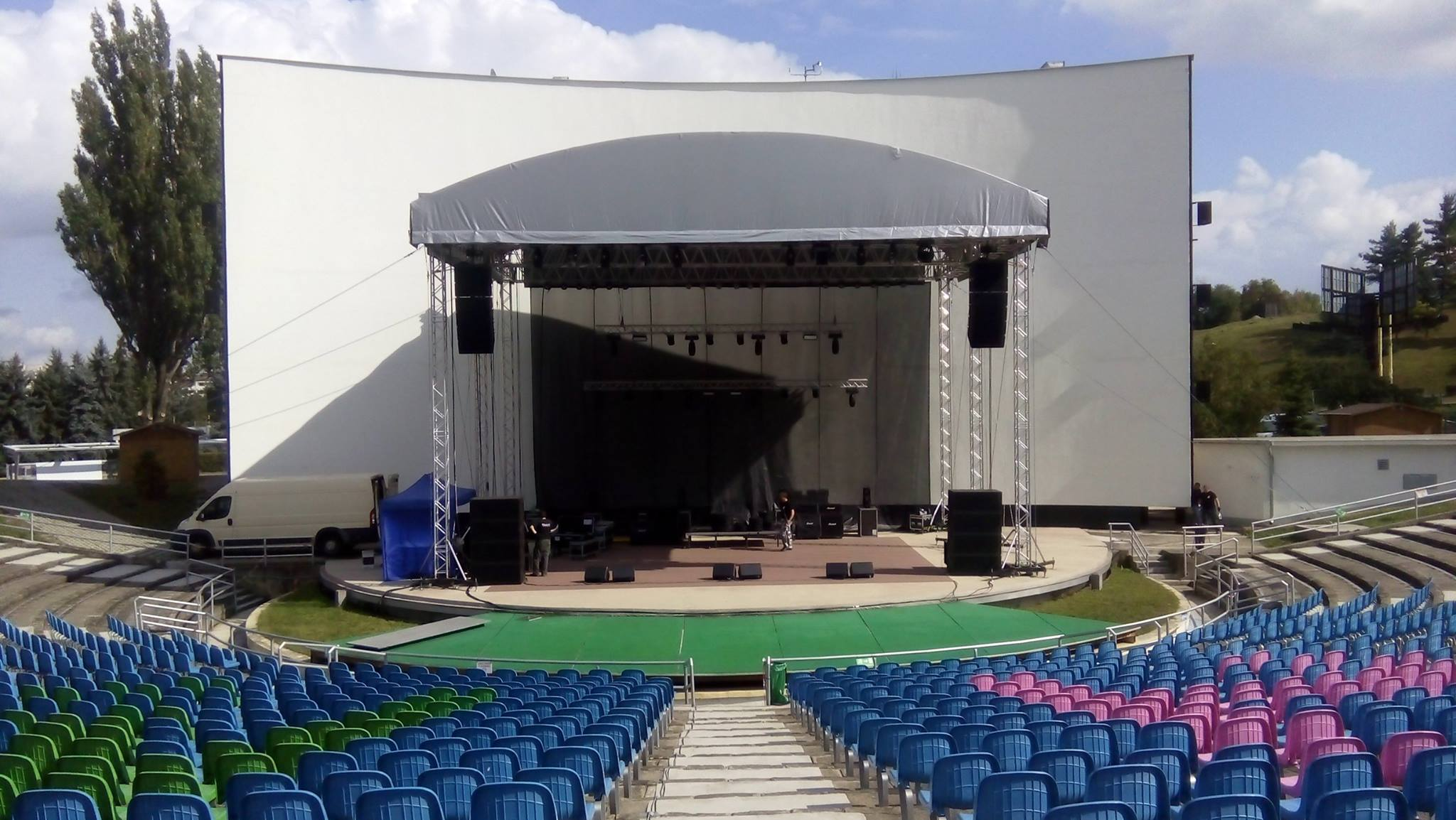
The Košice amphitheater in the Košice-Sever borough

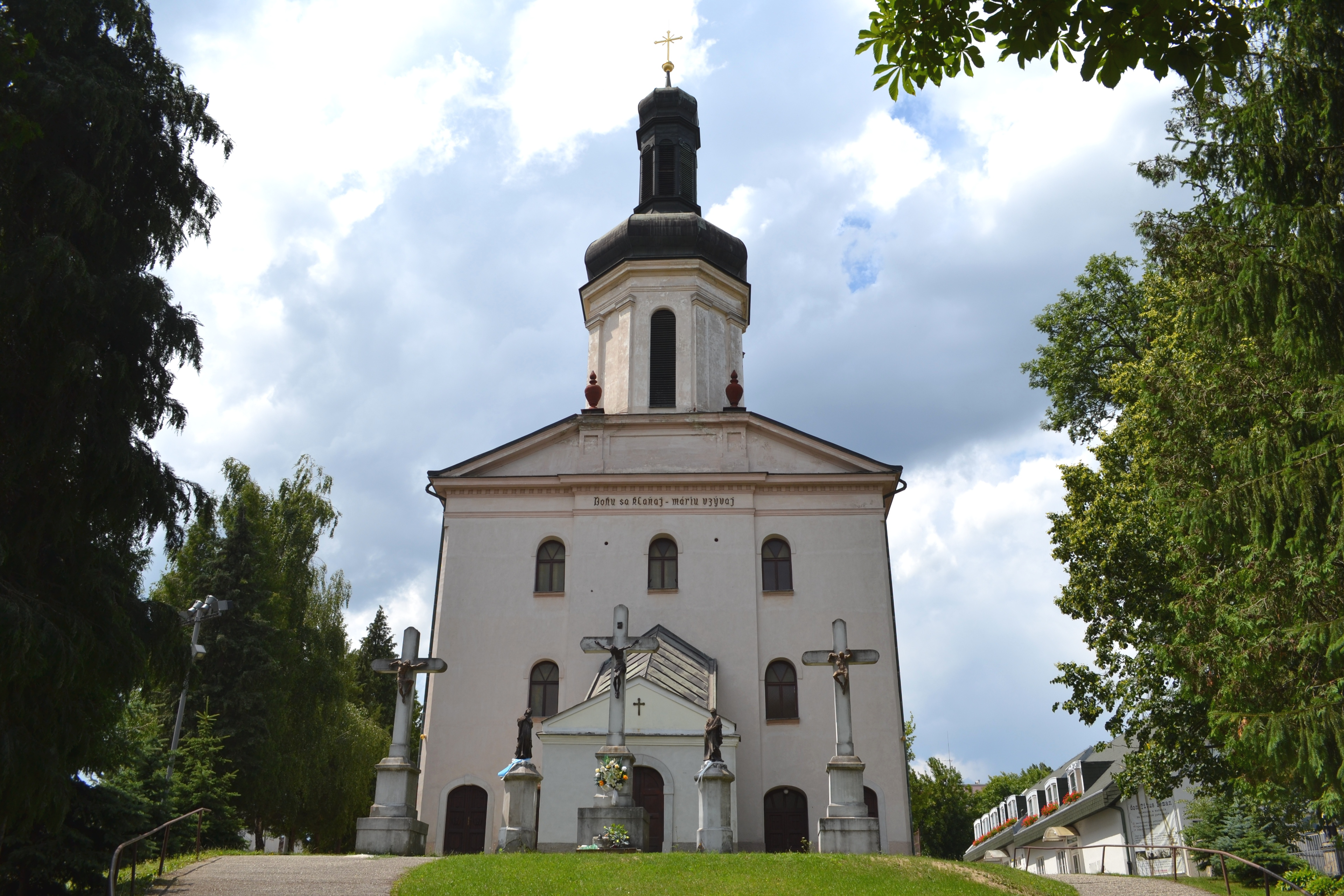
Our Lady of Sorrows Church

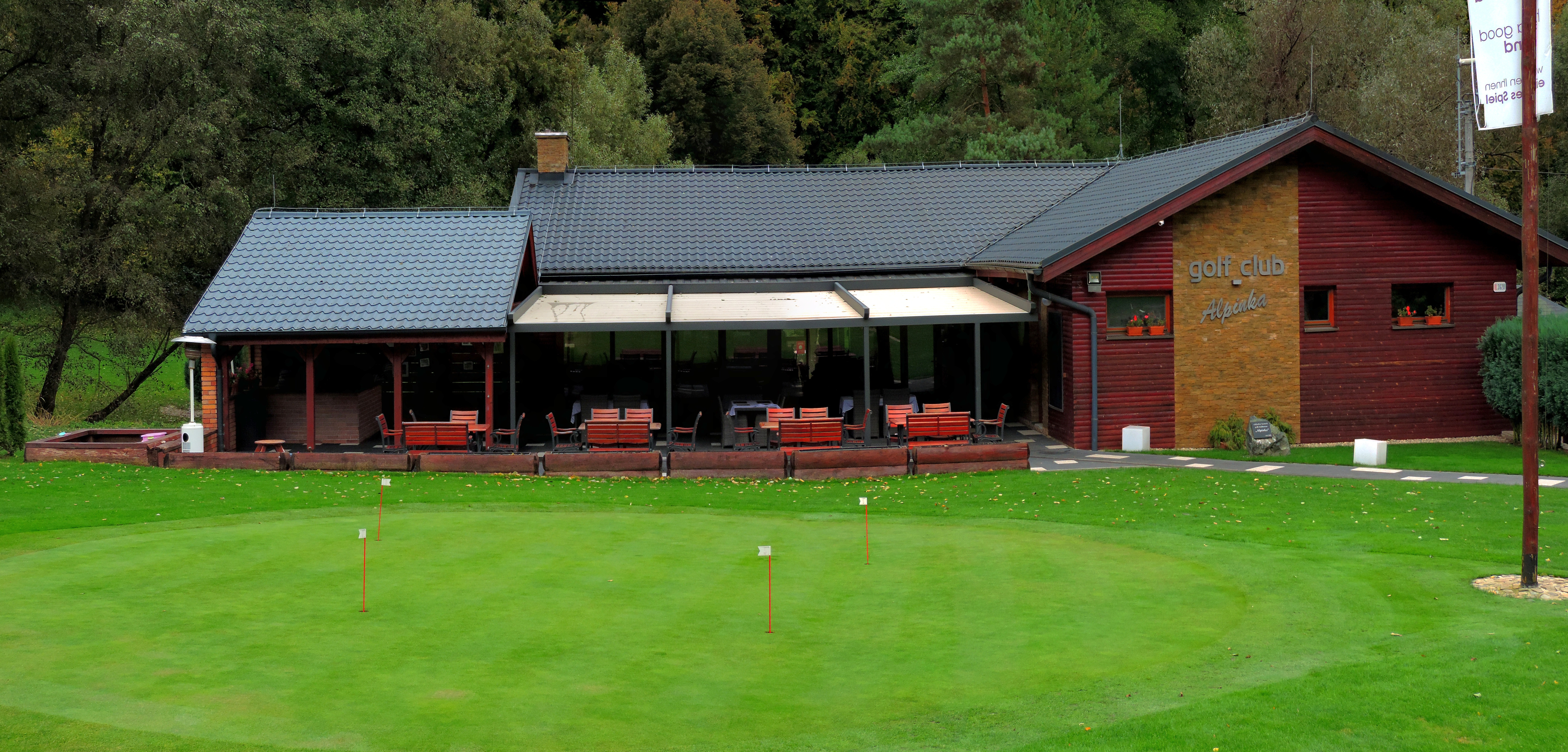
Golf course GC Alpinka

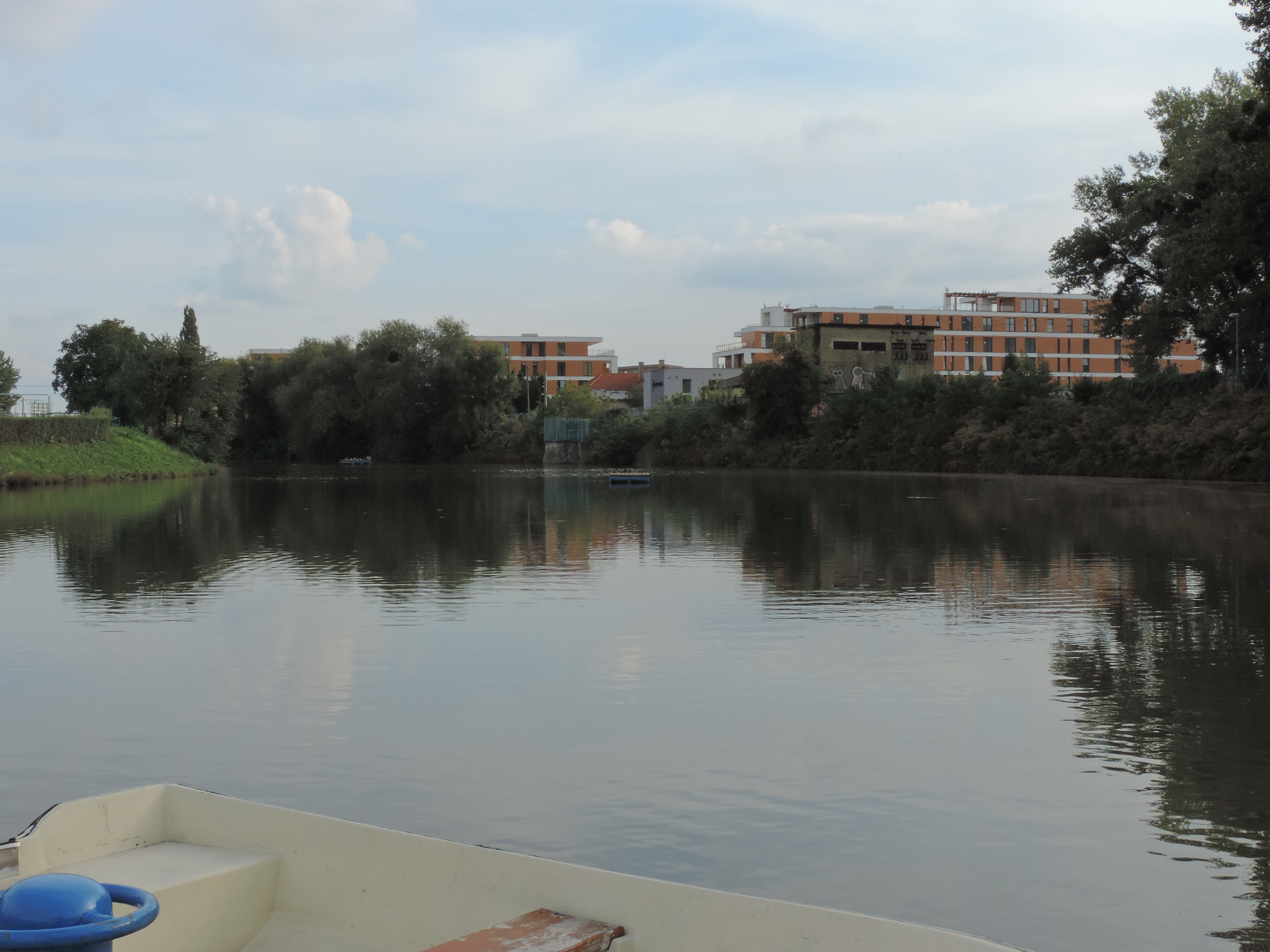
Pond in the Anička area

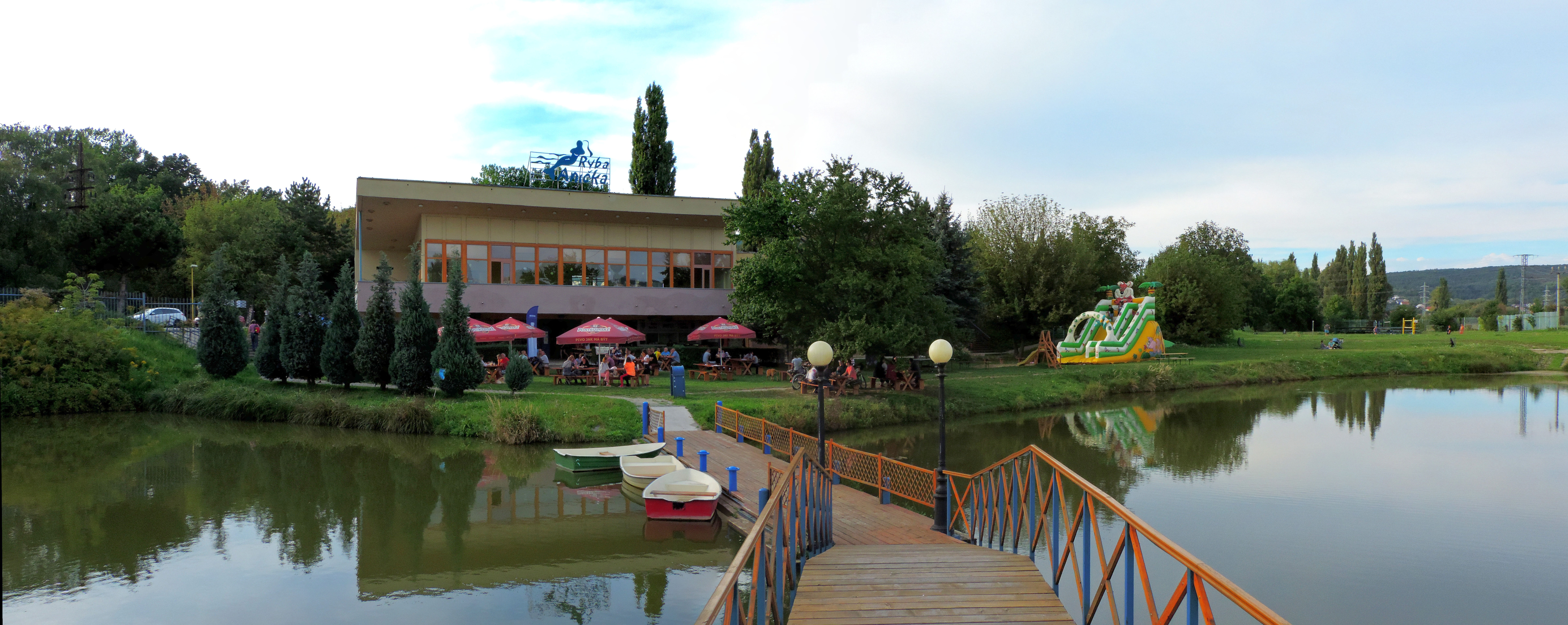
Tourist facilities in the Anička area

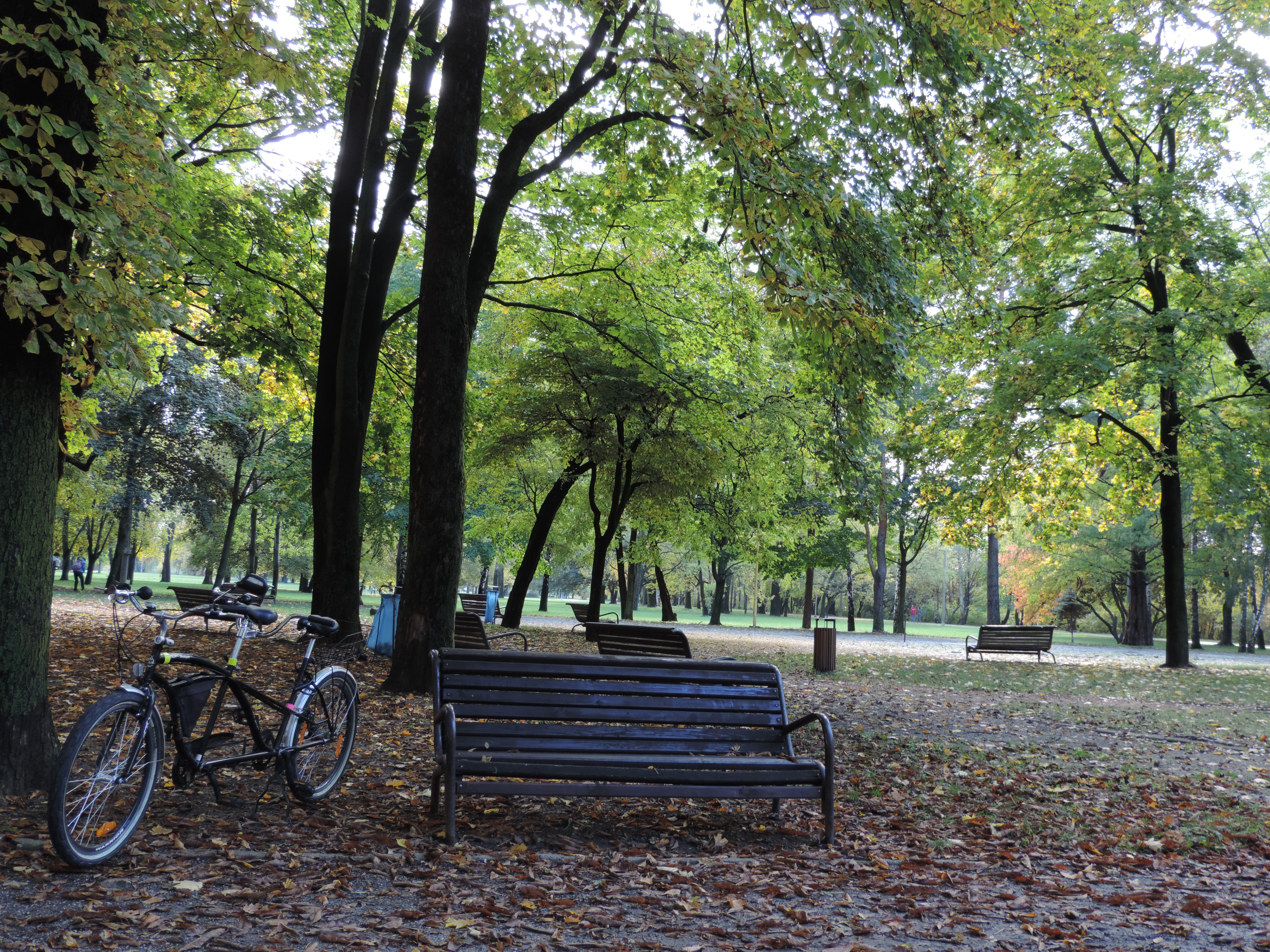
Park in the Anička area during autumn

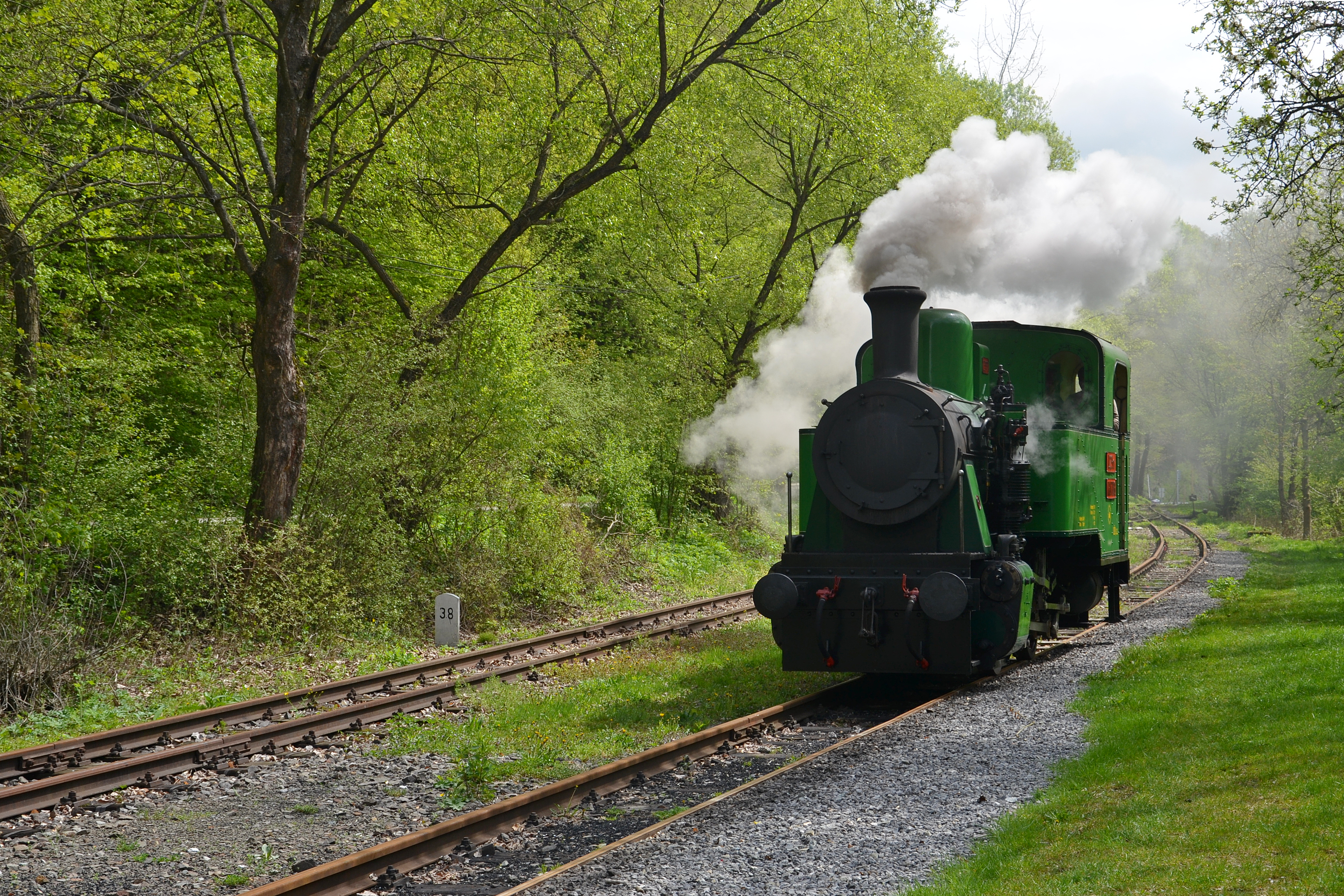
Čermeľ narrow-gauge heritage railway

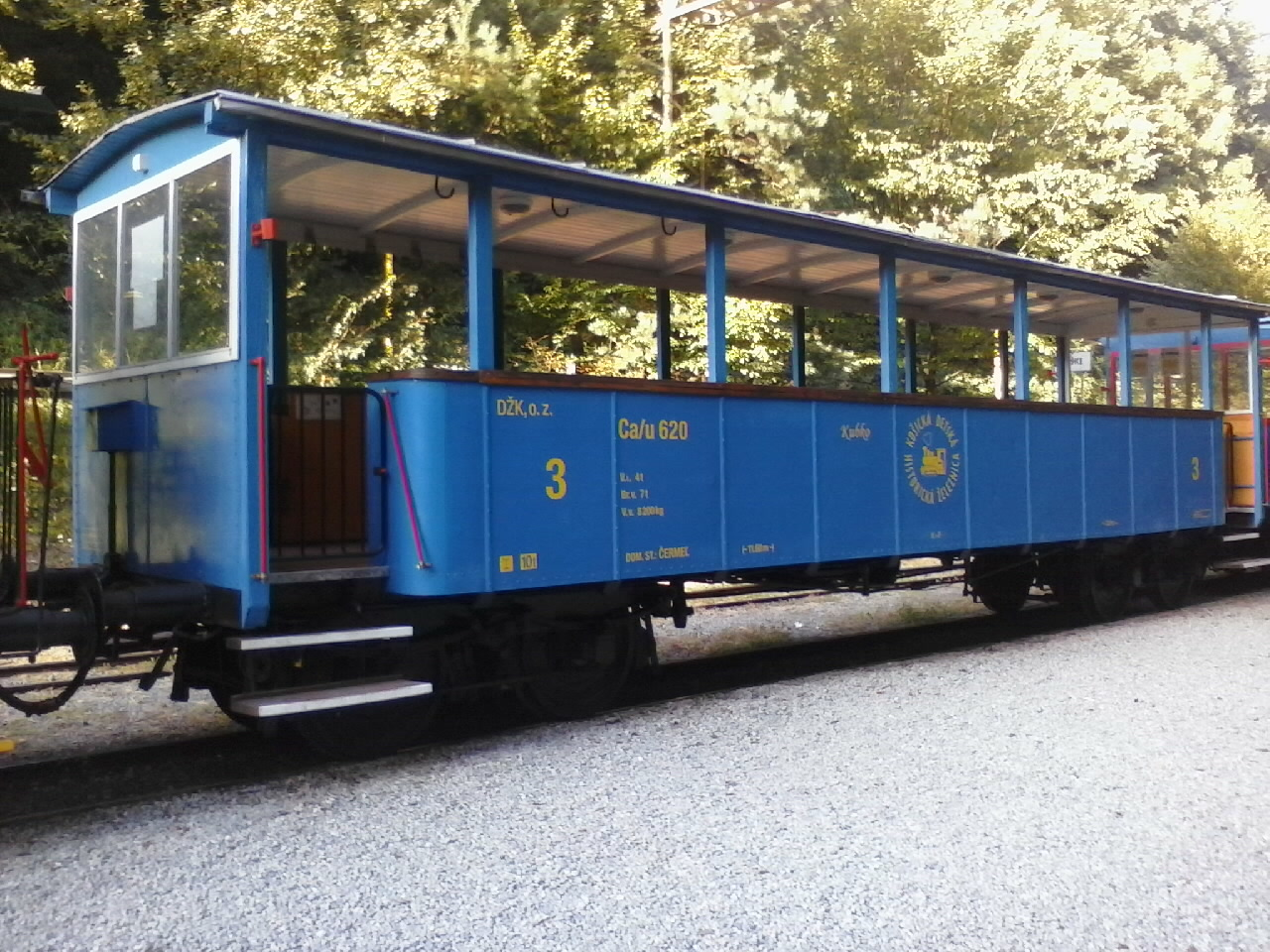
One of the summertime passenger cars of the Čermeľ heritage railway

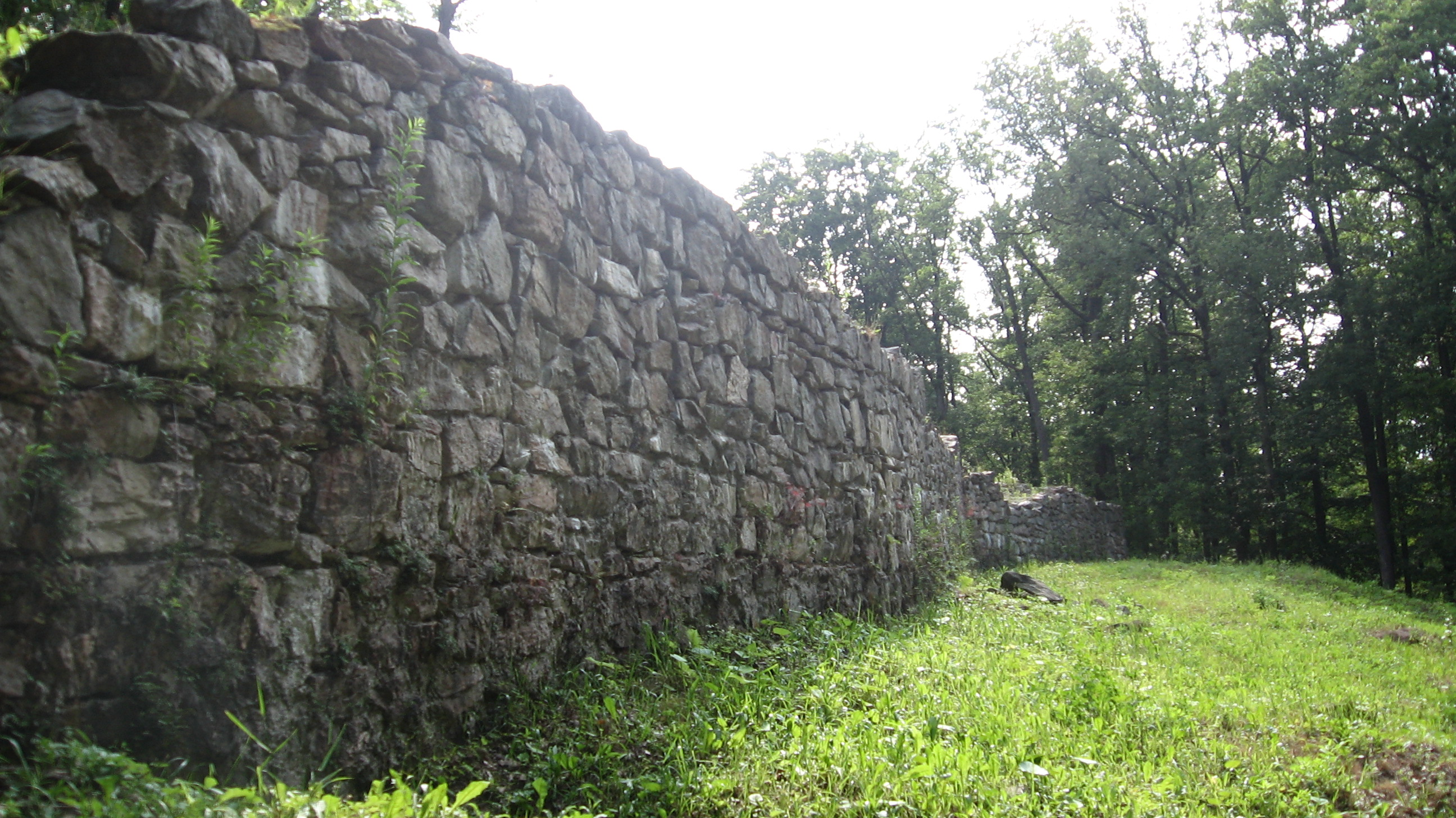
Ruins of a stone wall of Košice Castle at Hradová

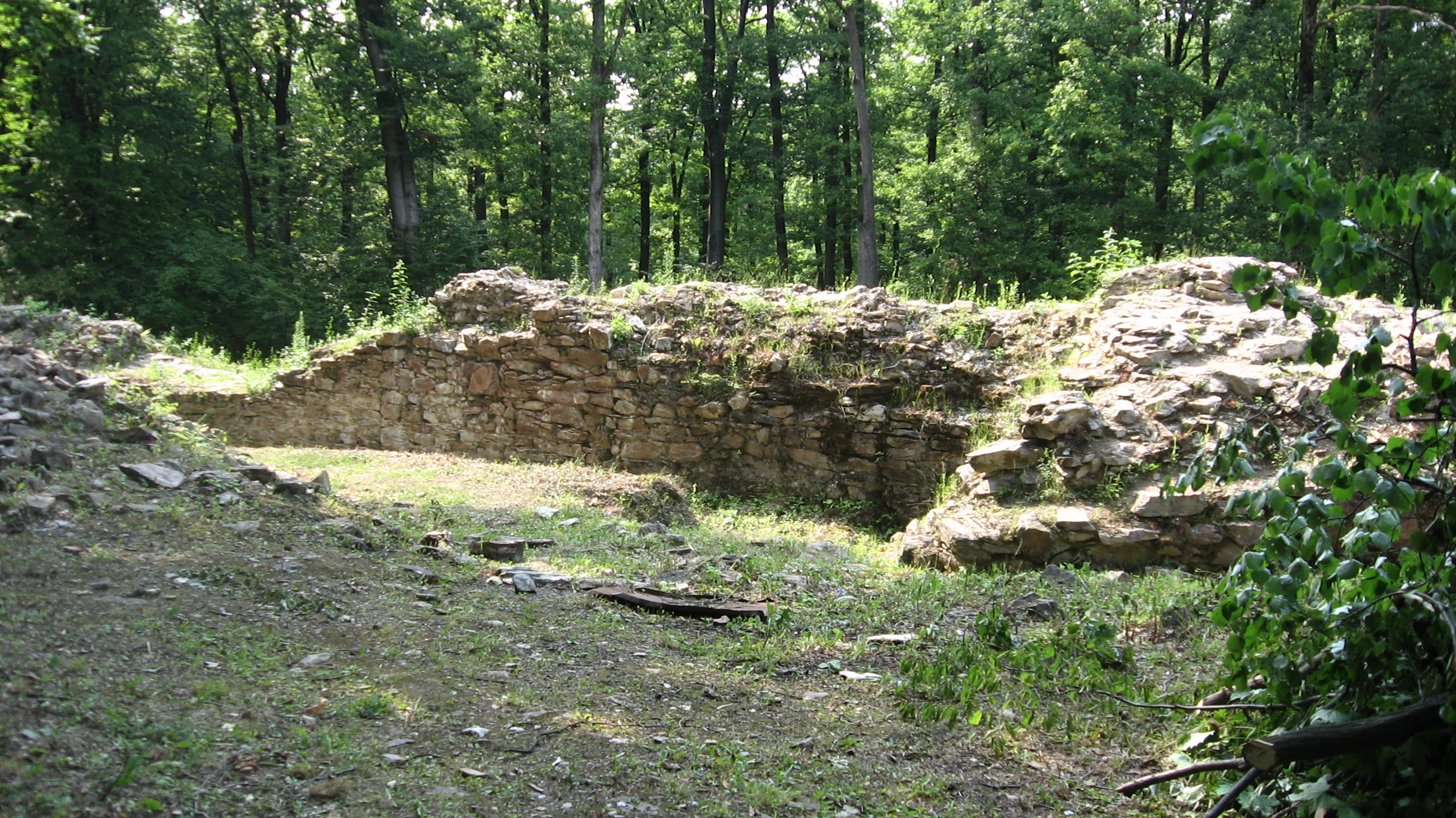
Ruins of Košice Castle at Hradová

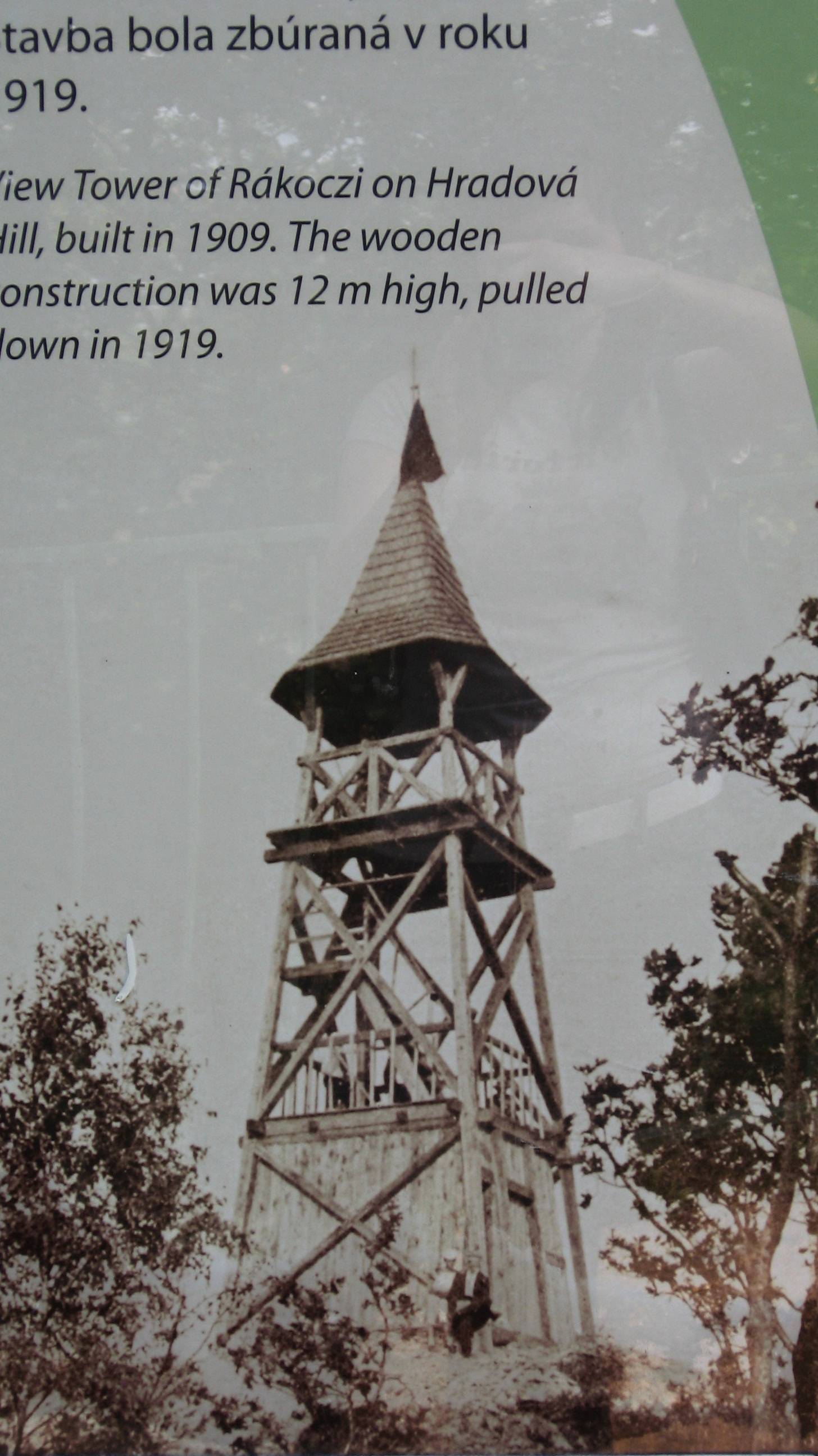
Photo of the old observation tower on Hradová, from the early 20th century

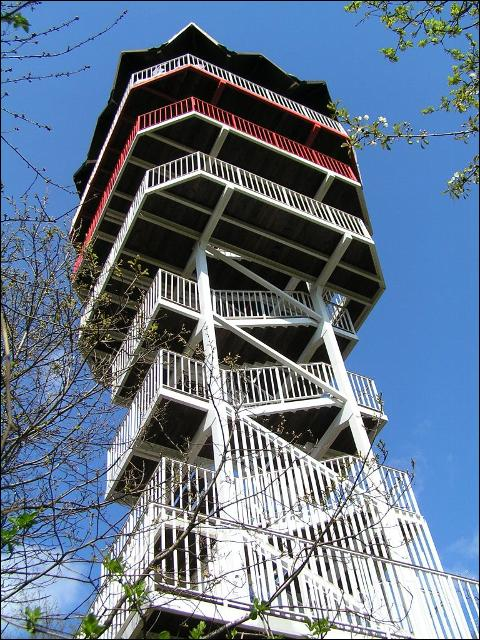
The current observation tower on Hradová (opened in 1987), near he castle ruins

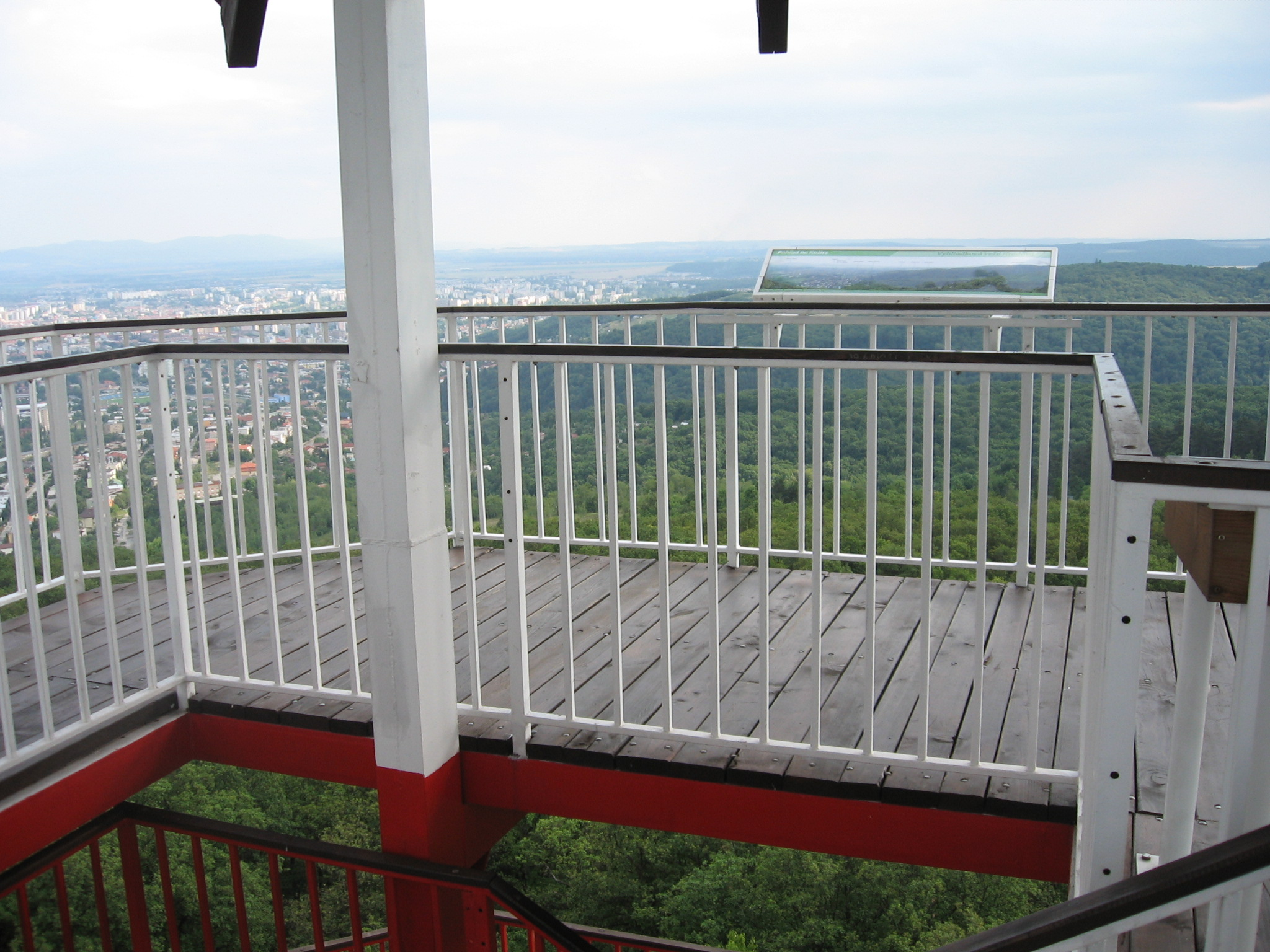
The top platform of the observation tower on Hradová

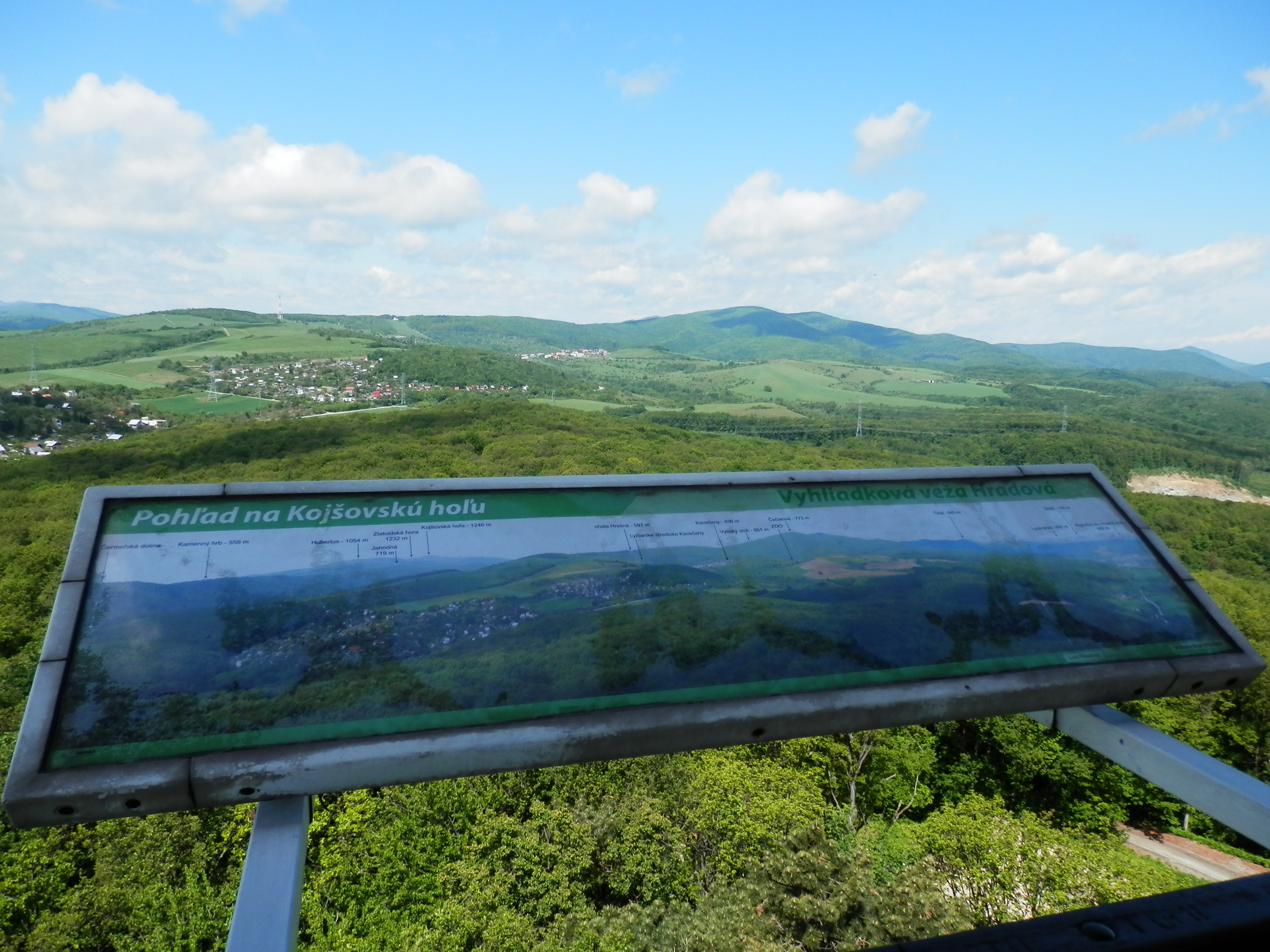
A view from the observation tower on Hradová

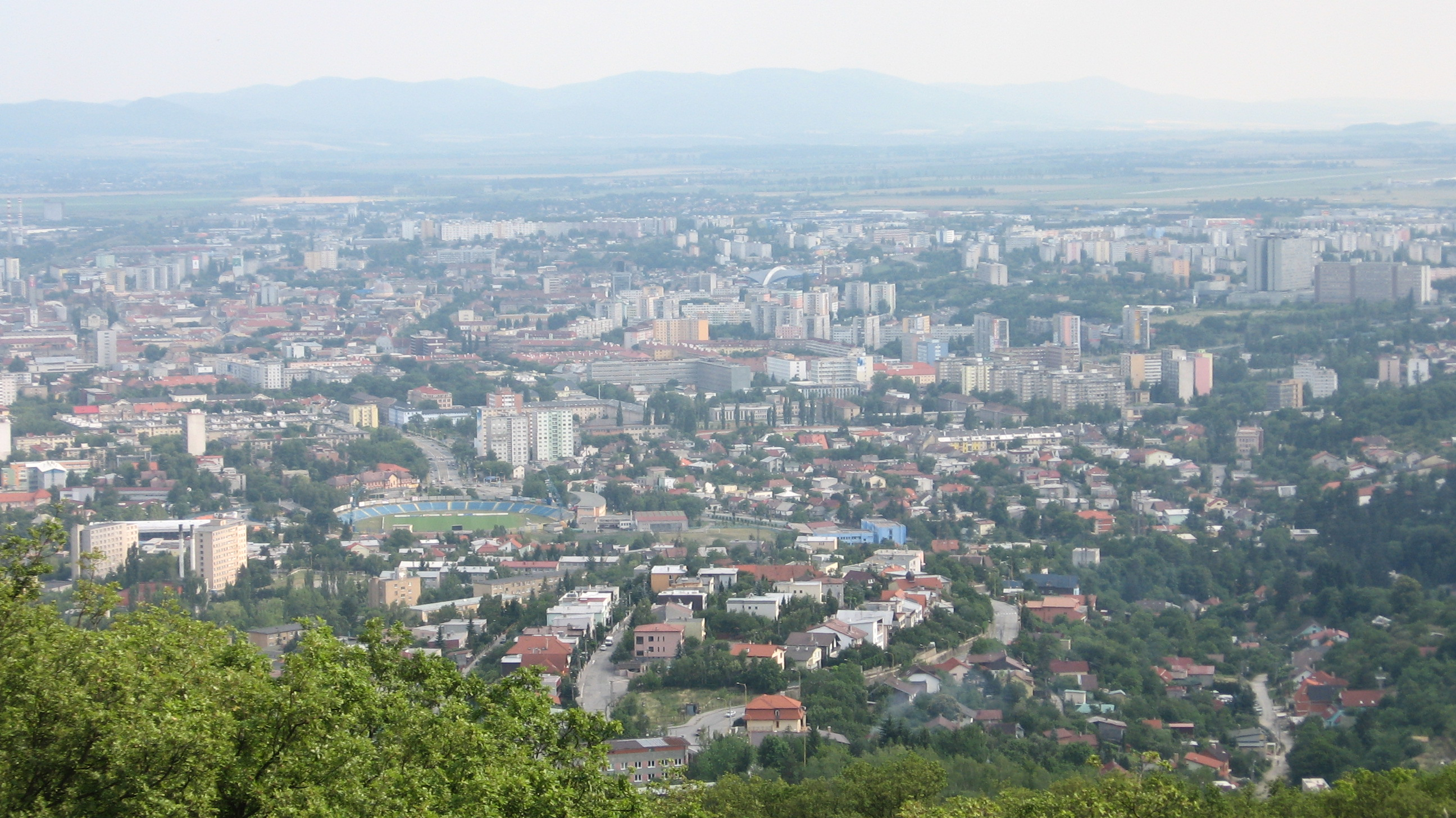
A view of central and western Košice from the observation tower on Hradová

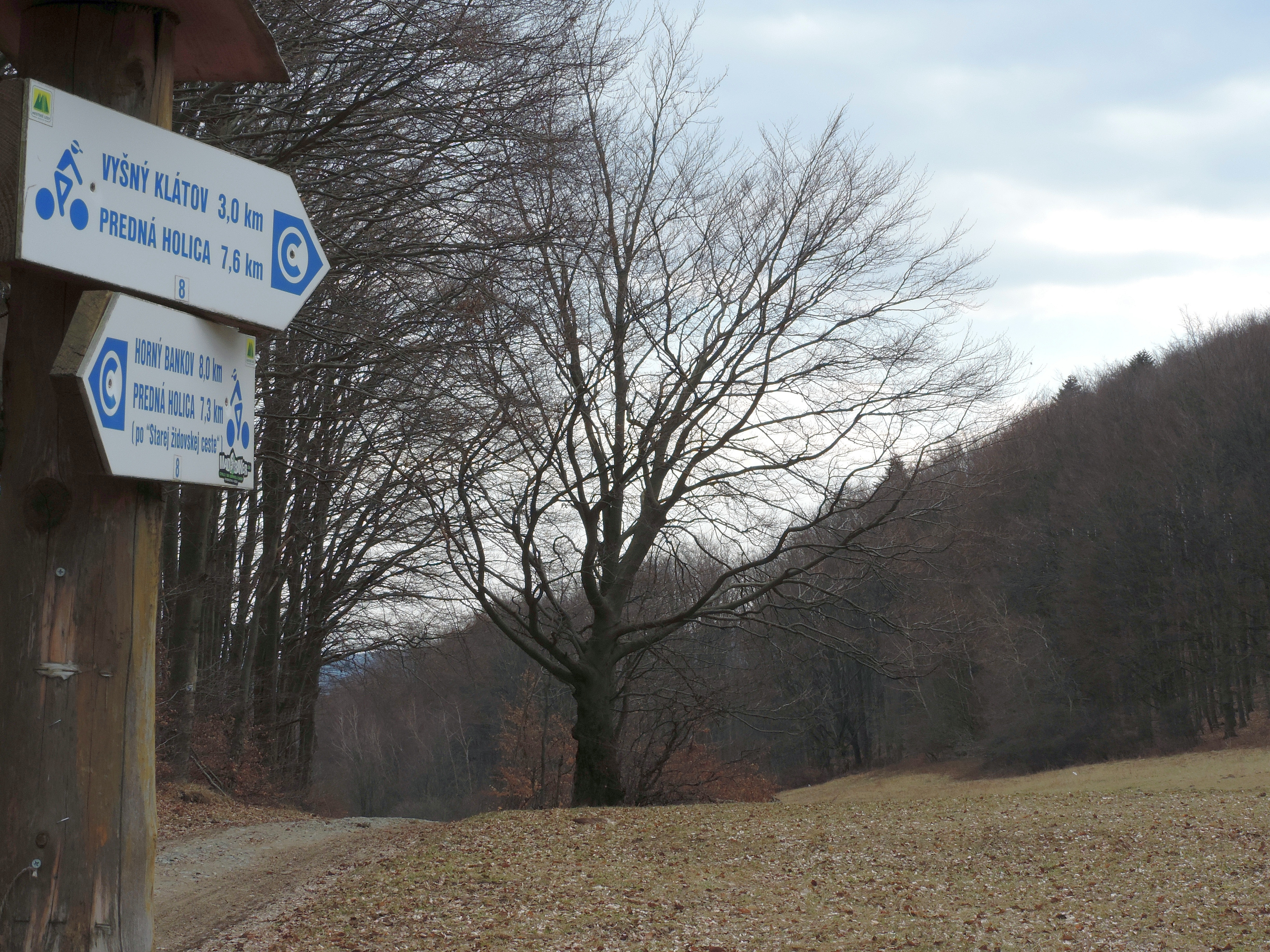
A cycling trail in the wilderness area of the borough

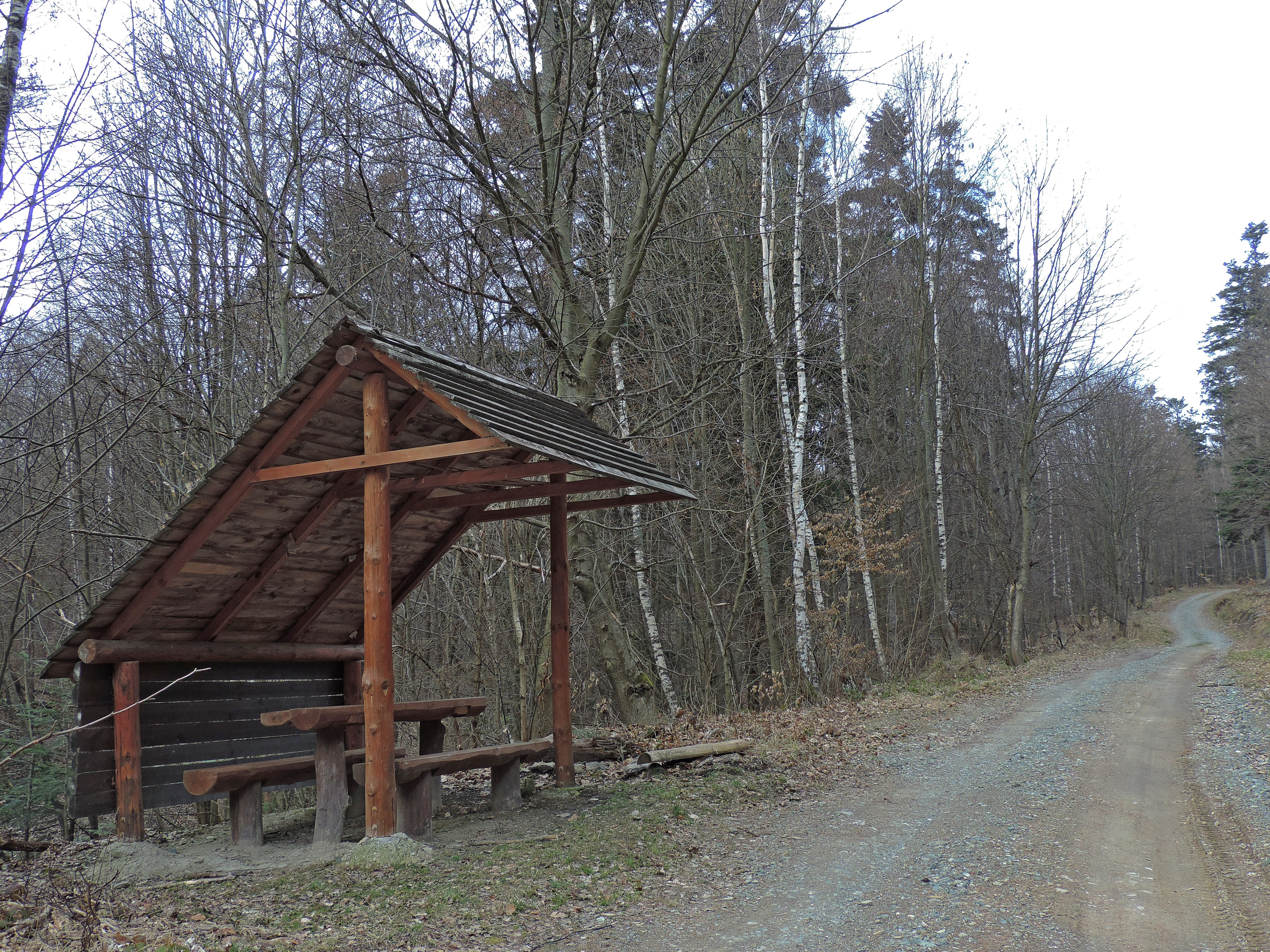
Shelter for hikers and cyclists

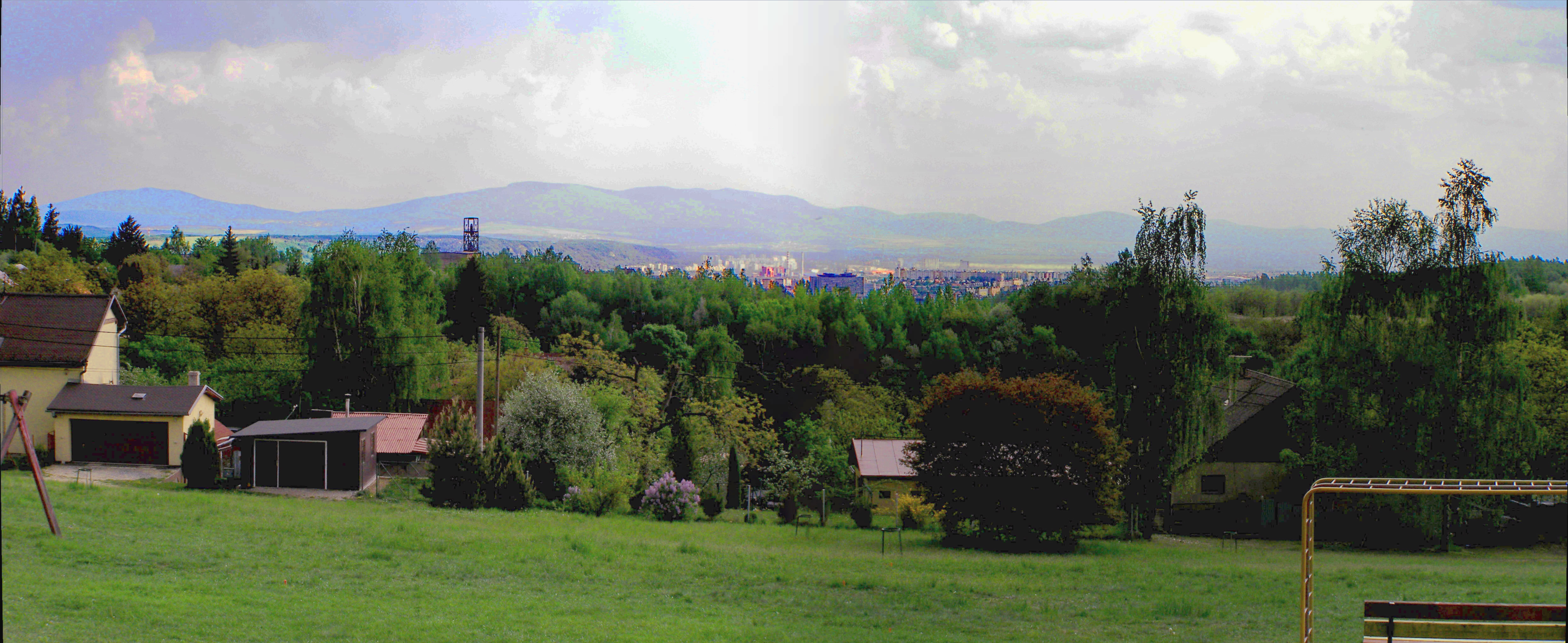
Bankov recreational area on the periphery of Košice-Sever

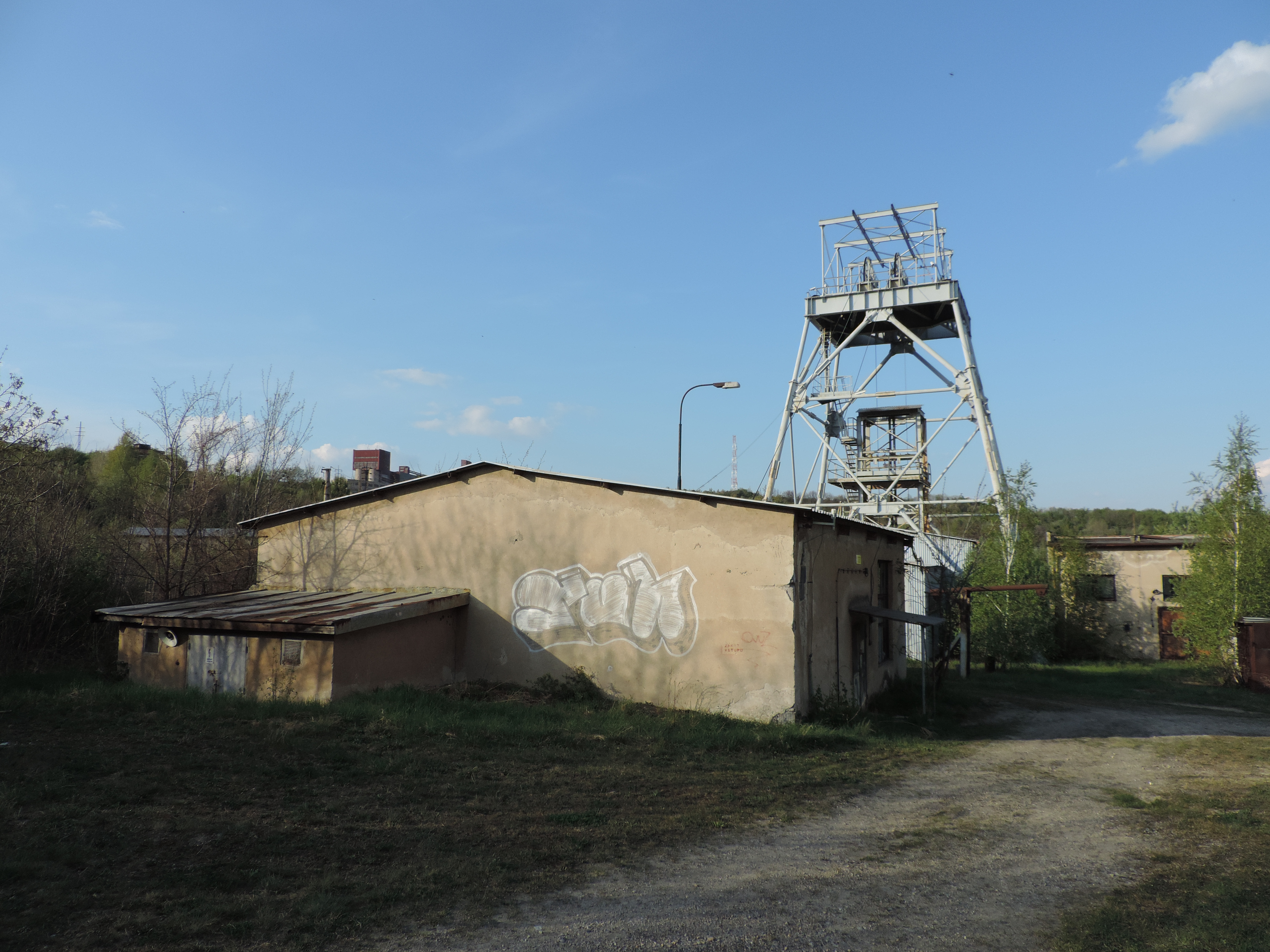
Remains of the defunct mine in the Bankov area

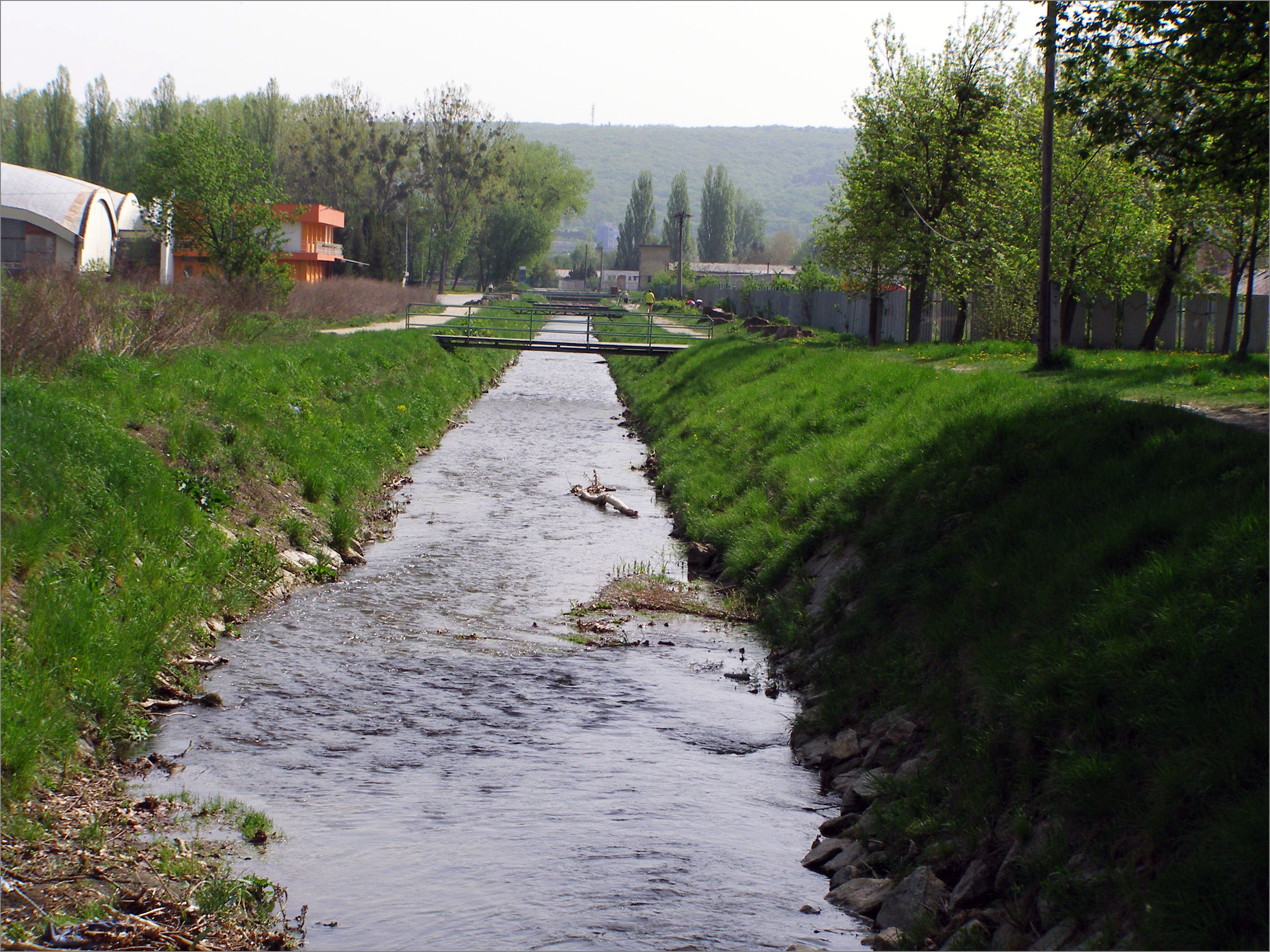
The Čermeľ stream that flows through the borough
