= Sever, Moimenta da Beira =

Sever
- Civil parish
- Location in Portugal
- Coordinates: 41.001°N 7.706°W
- Country: Portugal
- Region: Norte
- Intermunic. comm.: Douro
- District: Viseu
- Municipality: Moimenta da Beira

Area
  - Total: 10.03 km^{2} (3.87 sq mi)

Population (2011)
  - Total: 536
  - Density: 53/km^{2} (140/sq mi)
- Time zone: UTC+00:00 (WET)
  - Summer (DST): UTC+01:00 (WEST)

Sever is a civil parish in the municipality of Moimenta da Beira, northern Portugal. The population in 2011 was 536, in an area of 10.03 km^{2}.
