= Moimenta da Beira =

- Municipality
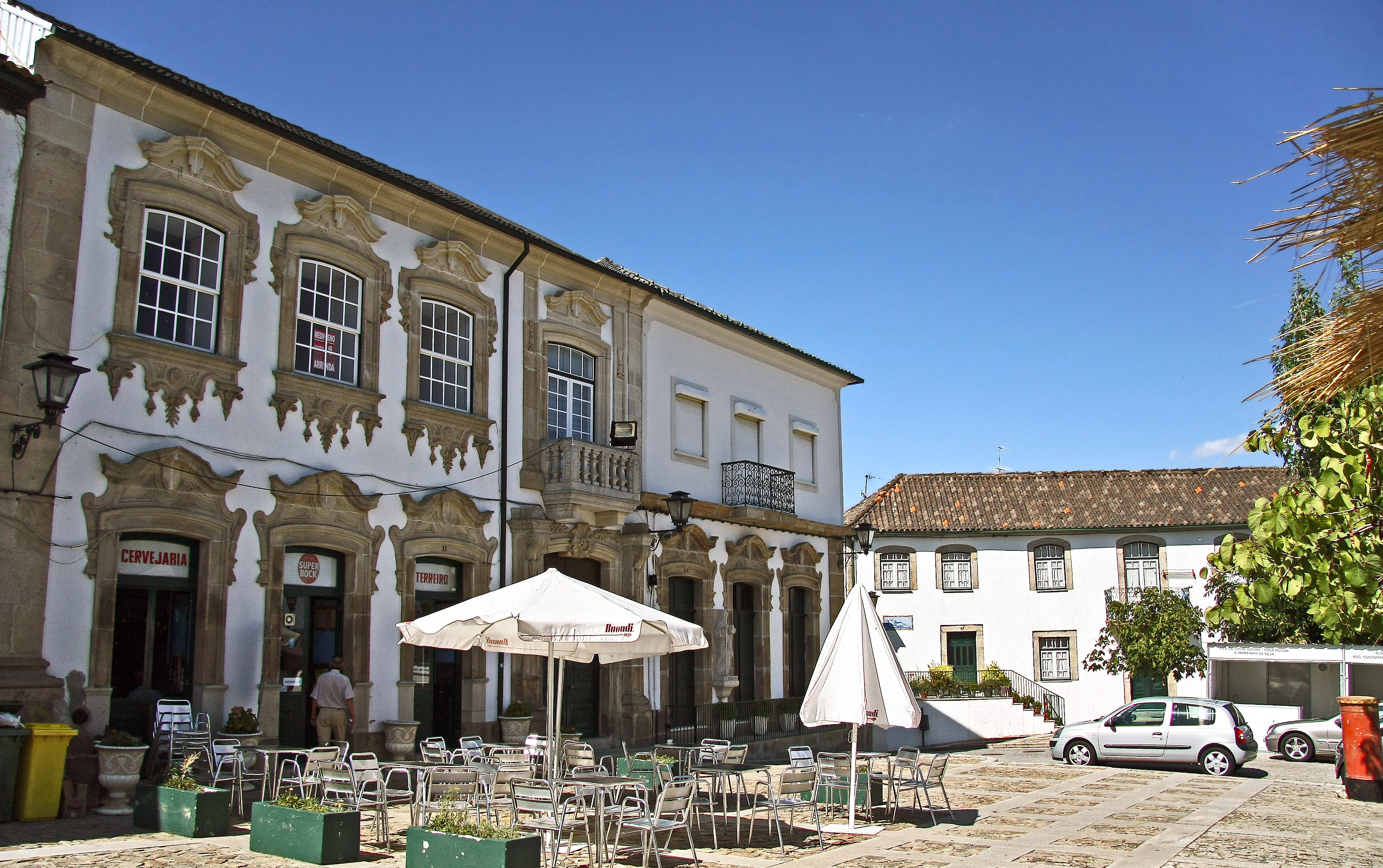
- View of Moimenta da Beira

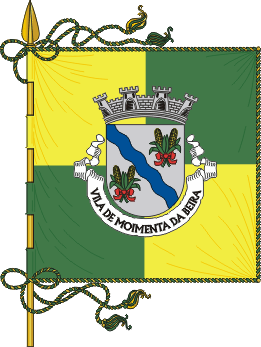
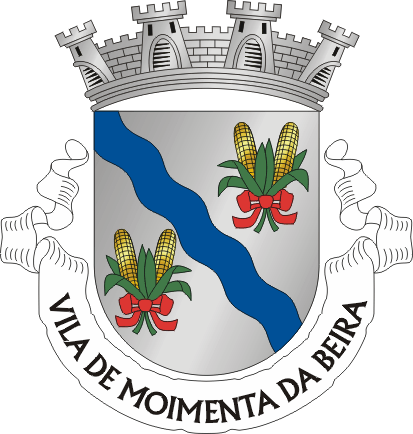
- Flag Coat of arms
- Interactive map of Moimenta da Beira
- Location in Portugal
- Coordinates: 40°58′47″N 7°36′49″W
- Country: Portugal
- Region: Norte
- Intermunic. comm.: Douro
- District: Viseu
- Parishes: 16

Government
  - President: José Eduardo Ferreira (PS)

Area
  - Total: 219.97 km^{2} (84.93 sq mi)
- Elevation: 894 m (2,933 ft)

Population (2011)
  - Total: 10,212
  - Density: 46.425/km^{2} (120.24/sq mi)
- Time zone: UTC+00:00 (WET)
  - Summer (DST): UTC+01:00 (WEST)
- Postal code: 3620
- Area code: 254
- Patron: São João Baptista
- Website: https://www.cm-moimenta.pt/

Moimenta da Beira (European Portuguese pronunciation: [mojˈmẽtɐ ðɐ ˈβɐjɾɐ]) is a municipality in the northern part of Portugal, located in the district of Viseu. The population in 2011 was 10,212, in an area of 219.97 km^{2}.

== History ==
Moimenta's history is fairly recent: Alfonso III of Asturias conquered Lamego from the Moors, when the first settlements along the Douro began by remnants of Visigothic tribes. "And there they entered into power, becoming absolute masters of everything that the force of arms would take", from the writings of the Scribe Santa Rosa Viterbo.

These bands created rural villages and homes that received in their local dialects the names Leomil, Baldos, Alvite, Toitam, Milieu, Segões, Sever and Ariz. The inhabitants of the mountains and castros, such as Pêra, Caria and São Félix, began to descend into the valleys, abandoning the rudimentary and fragile fortifications to work in the towns for the signeurial masters.

During this epoch, one of these lands (actually insignificant), whose name was implied to the localities ceremonial and funerary importance; it served as a place of homage and worship of the dead, and its name Moimenta (English: monument) was in reference to its mausoleum in honour of the dead.

By the 12th century all the civil parishes that now exist were already part of the Moimenta administration, although Leomil (Couto) and Caria (Honra) had their own magistrate until 1258.

One hundred years later, in the 14th century, the lands of the municipality of Moimenta da Beira, had three ecclesiastical parishes: Santa Maria de Caria, Santa Maria de Lobozaim and São Tiago de Leomil. Sever and Alvite were part of the Couto de São João de Tarouca (a military administration) created in 1140, while Vilar was part of the Honra de Fonte Arcada (an honorific title bestowed to nobility). After the 14th century, as the management of rural territories necessitated an administrative authority, eight municipalities were established in the region, which extended into the 19th century: Paçô; Nagosa e Castelo; Sever e Alvite; Pêra e Peravelha; Ariz e Peva; and Moimenta (then known as Moimenta de São João Baptista de Leomil), were formed at the expense of Leomil. Meanwhile, the parishes of Paradinha, Cabaços e Baldos, were separated from Leomil (resulting in this municipality only retaining the parishes of Sarzedo and Paraduça). Finally, the municipality of Caria, already a municipal seat with pillory in the Vila da Rua, included the small parishes of Arcozelos, Aldeia de Nacomba, Faia, Penso, Carregal, Lamosa, Quintela da Lapa and Segões.

The administrative reform of 1834 initiated a concentration of municipal authority in fewer administrative units: the small municipalities of Peravelha, Castelo, Nagosa and Arcos were extinguished and incorporated into the municipality of Moimenta da Beira; the municipality of Caria received the parishes of Arcozelos, Aldeia de Nacomba and Segões; and Leomil grew to include the municipalities of Paçô and Sever. In 1855 the municipality of Leomil was extinct and all its assets redistributed to Moimenta da Beira, which also received the parish of Vilar from the extinguished municipality of Sernancelhe.

On 21 May 1896, Caria and Rua were transferred from Sernancelhe to Moimenta da Beira. In the short span of 21 yeast, the small municipality of Moimenta, which included only Moimenta, Paradinha, Cabaços and Baldos, in 1834, grew to 19 by 1855. It was only in 1896 when the geographic limits were finally settled.

== Geography ==
=== Climate ===
Moimenta has a Mediterranean climate with warm to hot, dry summers and cold, wet winters.

Climate data for Moimenta da Beira, 1961-1985, altitude: 670 m (2,200 ft), precipitation 1981-2019
Month	Jan	Feb	Mar	Apr	May	Jun	Jul	Aug	Sep	Oct	Nov	Dec	Year
Mean daily maximum °C (°F)	9.3 (48.7)	10.7 (51.3)	12.8 (55.0)	15.5 (59.9)	18.8 (65.8)	23.7 (74.7)	27.4 (81.3)	27.5 (81.5)	24.9 (76.8)	18.7 (65.7)	12.9 (55.2)	9.5 (49.1)	17.6 (63.8)
Daily mean °C (°F)	4.6 (40.3)	5.7 (42.3)	7.2 (45.0)	9.4 (48.9)	12.0 (53.6)	16.0 (60.8)	18.6 (65.5)	18.3 (64.9)	16.6 (61.9)	12.1 (53.8)	7.5 (45.5)	4.8 (40.6)	11.1 (51.9)
Mean daily minimum °C (°F)	0.0 (32.0)	0.7 (33.3)	1.5 (34.7)	3.2 (37.8)	5.3 (41.5)	8.3 (46.9)	9.7 (49.5)	9.1 (48.4)	8.3 (46.9)	5.5 (41.9)	2.0 (35.6)	0.2 (32.4)	4.5 (40.1)
Average precipitation mm (inches)	118.6 (4.67)	94.1 (3.70)	54.0 (2.13)	87.3 (3.44)	64.3 (2.53)	29.7 (1.17)	13.8 (0.54)	15.5 (0.61)	39.8 (1.57)	109.2 (4.30)	105.2 (4.14)	123.2 (4.85)	854.7 (33.65)
Source: IPMA

Population of Moimenta da Beira (1801 - 2011)
Year	Pop.	±%
1801	1,747	—
1849	6,851	+292.2%
1900	14,555	+112.5%
1930	13,578	−6.7%
1960	15,272	+12.5%
1981	12,809	−16.1%
1991	12,317	−3.8%
2001	11,074	−10.1%
2011	10,212	−7.8%

The municipality is bounded by Tabuaço the northeast, Sernancelhe in the southeast, Sátão in the south, Vila Nova de Paiva in the west and Tarouca and Armamar in the northwest.

Administratively, the municipality is divided into 16 civil parishes (freguesias):

- Alvite
- Arcozelos
- Baldos
- Cabaços
- Caria
- Castelo
- Leomil
- Moimenta da Beira
- Paradinha e Nagosa
- Passô
- Pêra Velha, Aldeia de Nacomba e Ariz
- Peva e Segões
- Rua
- Sarzedo
- Sever
- Vilar

== Notable people ==
- Luís Pinto de Sousa Coutinho, 1st Viscount of Balsemão (1735 in Leomil – 1804) a Portuguese nobleman, politician, colonial administrator and diplomat.
- João Manuel (1967-2005) a Portuguese football player with over 380 club caps.
- Kiko Bondoso (born 1995) a Portuguese footballer with over 200 club caps
