= Finta (surname) =

Finta is a Hungarian surname. Notable people with the surname include:

- Imre Finta (1912–2003), Hungarian Nazi collaborator
- József Finta (1935–2024), Hungarian architect
- Zoltán Finta (born 1979), Hungarian football player
