= Carregal do Sal =

- Municipality
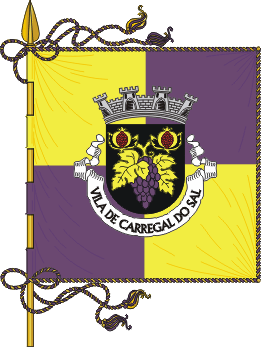
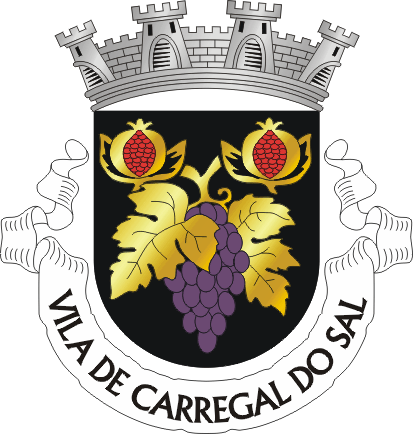
- Flag Coat of arms
- Interactive map of Carregal do Sal
- Location in Portugal
- Coordinates: 40°26′N 8°00′W
- Country: Portugal
- Region: Centro
- Intermunic. comm.: Viseu Dão Lafões
- District: Viseu
- Parishes: 5

Government
  - President: Rogério Abrantes (PS)

Area
  - Total: 116.89 km^{2} (45.13 sq mi)

Population (2011)
  - Total: 9,835
  - Density: 84.14/km^{2} (217.9/sq mi)
- Time zone: UTC+00:00 (WET)
  - Summer (DST): UTC+01:00 (WEST)
- Local holiday: 2nd Monday after the 3rd Sunday of July
- Website: www.carregal-digital.pt

Carregal do Sal (European Portuguese pronunciation: [kɐʁɨˈɣal du ˈsal]) is a municipality in Viseu District in Portugal. The population in 2011 was 9,835, in an area of 116.89 km^{2}.

The present mayor is Atílio dos Santos Nunes, elected by the Social Democratic Party. The municipal holiday is the second Monday after the third Sunday of July.

== Parishes ==
Administratively, the municipality is divided into 5 civil parishes (freguesias):

- Beijós
- Cabanas de Viriato
- Currelos, Papízios e Sobral
- Oliveira do Conde
- Parada

== History ==
The municipality was created in 1836, by merging the now extinct Currelos and Oliveira do Conde municipalities. There was a place in Currelos called Carregal. Later it became known as “do Sal” (English: of salt) after the big salt evaporation ponds constructed there by order of Francisco Lucas de Melo Pais do Amaral (7 May 1752 – 6 April 1819), of Casa de Santar (Melo Pais do Amaral, and after Count of Santar).

Taking advantage of the location by the road, by then the major land connection between Viseu and Coimbra districts, Francisco Lucas de Melo Pais do Amaral therefore ordered the building of huge salt evaporation ponds in some lands he had inherited, which could supply the entire region. This business was kept in the hands of its descendants (Soares de Albergaria Pais e Melo) over almost 200 years, and consisted of collecting the salt from Figueira da Foz, transporting it by boat through Mondego and Dão rivers, up to Carregal, then laid in big warehouses, in the place named "Salinas" (English: salt evaporation ponds) in the town border, where Francisco Lucas de Melo Pais do Amaral ordered, moreover, the build of the house named after it, today the Museu Municipal Manuel Soares de Albergaria.

== Notable people ==
- Aristides de Sousa Mendes (1885 in Cabanas de Viriato – 1954), the Portuguese consul-general in Bordeaux, defied the orders of António de Oliveira Salazar's Estado Novo regime by issuing thousands of visas to refugees fleeing Nazi-occupied France; although punished for his actions, he was posthumously redeemed and commemorated, and a museum in his honor was inaugurated on July 19th, 2024, in his hometown.
- Ondina Maria Farias Veloso (1956–2019) a singer, known as Dina, sang in the Eurovision Song Contest 1992
