= InterContinental Budapest =

Hotel in Budapest, Hungary

Coordinates: 47.49810°N 19.04765°E

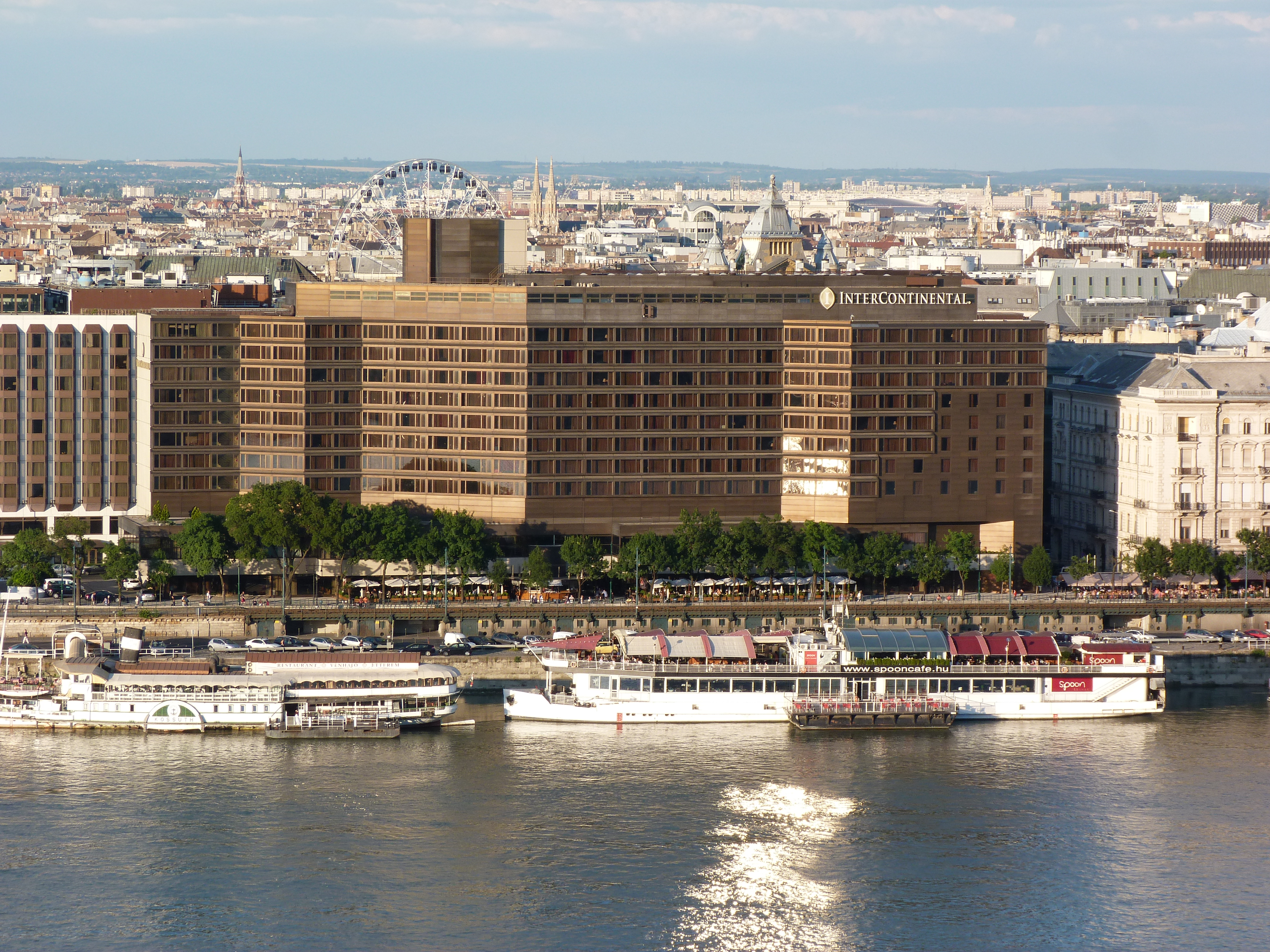
- Interactive map of the InterContinental Budapest area
- Former names: Hotel Forum Budapest
- Hotel chain: InterContinental

General information
- Location: Budapest, Hungary, Apáczai Csere János u. 12-14
- Opened: 1981
- Owner: Al Habtoor Group
- Operator: InterContinental

Design and construction
- Architect: József Finta
- Developer: HungarHotels

Other information
- Number of rooms: 402
- Number of suites: 26
- Number of restaurants: 2

Website
- Official website

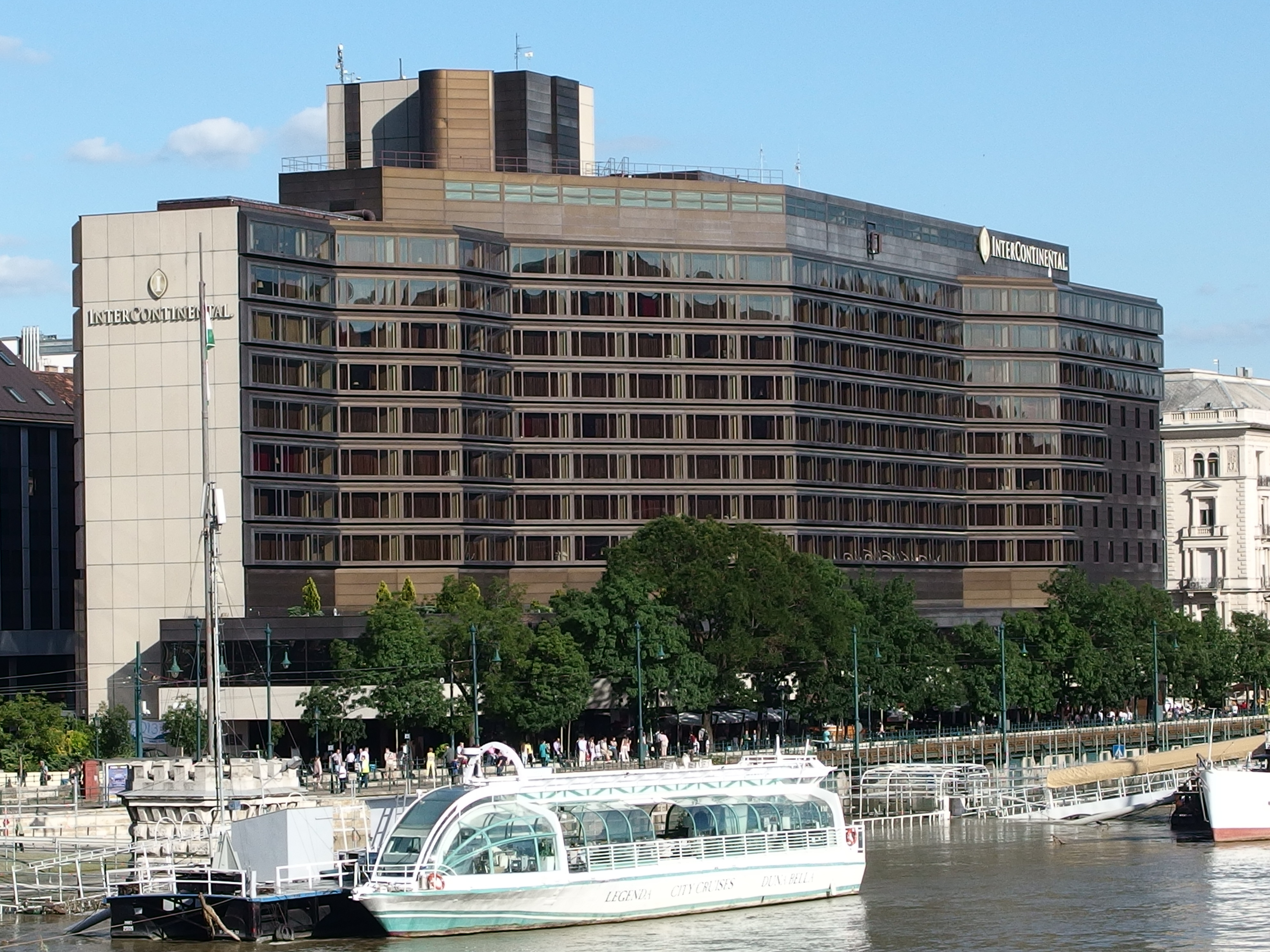
InterContinental Budapest

The InterContinental Budapest Hotel is located on the Danube bank.

== History of the InterContinental Budapest ==
The hotel was originally built as the Forum Hotel. Its construction was made possible by a favorable credit contract after an Austrian-Hungarian government agreement. Construction began in July 1979 based on the plans of the architect József Finta and the interior designer László Király.

The Forum Hotel opened on 28 November 1981, owned by a state-owned company, called HungarHotels. After the nearby Duna Inter-Continental it was the second hotel operated on a franchise agreement. The success was proved by the fact that the credit with interest given for 15 years was returned in the 7th year of operation.

In 1994 as the second phase of privatization the Forum Hotel went over into ÁPV RT’s ownership (as a state property) in order to prepare its sale. The tender took place in three phases. The first turn was invalid, at the second one Daewoo won, but after the announcement it was invalidated considering formal defects, and the third one InterContinental won. As of 1 November 1996 InterContinental owned the hotel with 95% after half a year the company bought the remaining 5% of employee shares. The contract contained the obligatory renovation condition and the restriction of no redundancies within a year. The name change from Forum to InterContinental took place on 6 May 1997. Thanks to the renovation between 1998 and 2000 the hotel became a 5-star property.

== Previous hotels in the area ==
In the early 1900s the Danube-riverside was adorned by a row of hotels: The Carlton, Bristol, Grand Hotel Hungaria and Dunapalota-Ritz.

During World War II, the Portuguese Consulate in Budapest was located in the Hotel Dunapalota-Ritz, which was on the site of today's InterContinental Budapest. In 1944, the diplomats Carlos de Sampayo Garrido (Ambassador) and Alberto Teixeira Branquinho (Chargé d'affaires) granted entry visas to Portugal to those refugees persecuted and threatened with imprisonment and death by Nazi Germany and its Hungarian allies. They acted under instructions and with the full backing of the conservative and authoritarian Portuguese regime and their actions made it possible for approximately 1000 Jewish refugees to escape The Holocaust and find in Portugal a gateway to safety and freedom.

After World War II this row of hotels was almost totally destroyed. Its rebirth started at the end of the '60s with the construction of the Duna Inter-Continental in 1968, today known as the Budapest Marriott Hotel.

== Notable Guests at the Hotel ==
- João Havelange, former FIFA president (1982)
- Amanda Lear, French-born European disco queen of the '70s (1982)
- Andrew Lloyd Webber, one of the most popular musical composer of the 20th century (1983)
- Mark Spitz, American Olympic and world champion winner swimmer (1983)
- Paul Arma, Hungarian-French composer (1984)
- Larry Hagman, number one star of Dallas, an American prime-time television soap opera (1984)
- Sylvia Kristel, Dutch actress, model and singer, starring in French film Emmanuelle (1984)
- Edwin Moses, American athlete who won 107 competitions in a row between 1977 and 1987 (1986)
- Cliff Richard, British singer (1989)
- Joe Cocker, English rock/blues singer (1989)
- Ivan Lendl, regarded as the best professional tennis player in the '80s (1991)
- Giacomo Agostini, Italian Moto GP rider in the '60s and '70s (1992)
- Nigel Mansell, British racing driver (1992)
- Michael Schumacher, German former Formula One driver (1992, 1993)
- Lee Haney, former American IFBB professional bodybuilder (1993)
- Bonnie Tyler, Welsh singer, visited Hungary during her Silhouette in Red Tour (1993)
- Kylie Minogue, Australian pop singer, songwriter, and actress (1993)
- Damon Hill, retired British racing driver from England (1993, 1998, 1999)
- Ede Teller, Hungarian-American theoretical physicist (1994)
- Richard Clayderman, French pianist (1994)
- Ferenc Puskás, Hungarian footballer and manager (1995)
- Plácido Domingo, Spanish tenor (1996)
- José Carreras, Spanish Catalan tenor (1996)
- Diana Ross, American singer and actress
- Gabriela Sabatini, former professional Argentine tennis player (1997)

== Sources ==
Milgram, Avraham. Portugal, Salazar, and the Jews, translated by Naftali Greenwood. Jerusalem, Yad Vashem, 2011 ISBN 9789653083875.
