= Eric Moed =

American architect and artist

- Born: 1987 (age 38–39); New York, NY
- Education: Harvard University Graduate School of Design (MDes); Pratt Institute (B.Arch)
- Occupations: Architect; Artist; Educator
- Known for: Public Memorialization, Architectural Design
- Notable work: "Work Towards Fairness" "Memory Monument" "Changing Perspective" "Art of This Century II"
- Website: www.officeofopenpractice.com

Eric Moed (born 1987 - New York, NY) is an American architect, artist, and educator whose work focuses on memorialization and the politics of public space. He is the founder of the design studio/agency Office of Open Practice and an Adjunct Associate Professor at the Pratt Institute School of Architecture. Moed is known for public art commissions such as Work Towards Fairness in Cabanas de Viriato, Portugal, and Changing Perspective in Jacksonville, Florida, and for his academic and design work exploring collective memory.

== Education ==
Moed received a Bachelor of Architecture (B.Arch) from the Pratt Institute School of Architecture in 2012. In 2019, he earned a Masters in Design (MDes) in Art, Design and the Public Domain from the Harvard University Graduate School of Design (GSD).

== Career ==
=== Academic career ===
Since 2022, Moed has been on the faculty at the Pratt Institute School of Architecture, where he teaches core architecture courses and seminars on memory in the public sphere. He has also been an adjunct lecturer at CUNY New York City College of Technology. At Harvard Graduate School of Design, he was a Teaching Fellow for Krzysztof Wodiczko and taught a J-Term course on memorialization.

From 2018 to 2019, Moed was a founding member of the Poetic Justice Group at the MIT Media Lab, where he researched new forms of justice through art and design.

=== Professional practice ===
In 2020, Moed founded the Office of Open Practice, a transdisciplinary creative studio. The studio has worked with clients such as Interactive Corp (IAC) and The New Museum.

From 2020 to 2022, Moed was a member of NEW INC, the New Museum's cultural incubator, as part of the 'Hybrid Practice' and 'Future Memory' tracks. In 2022, he was a winner of the Brooklyn Public Library's BKLYN Incubator, receiving a grant to develop programming for the Central Library’s InfoCommons.

== Notable projects and exhibitions ==
=== Work Towards Fairness (2013) ===
Moed's undergraduate thesis project, Work Towards Fairness, won a competition sponsored by United Colors of Benetton. The project involved designing and building a three-pavilion installation at the abandoned home of Aristides de Sousa Mendes in Cabanas de Viriato, Portugal. Sousa Mendes was a Portuguese diplomat who saved Moed's family and thousands of other refugees during the Holocaust. The project received coverage in The New York Times, Haaretz, and Archinect.

=== Changing Perspective (2019) ===
In 2019, Moed completed a permanent public art commission for the City of Jacksonville, Florida. The project, titled Changing Perspective, consists of a series of sculptural bike racks installed in downtown Jacksonville. The racks function as signposts that point towards sites of significant local Black history, with all racks designed to align in perspective to create a visual link between the locations.

=== Memory Monument (2020) ===
Memory Monument is a participatory workshop and art project that explores public engagement with existing and proposed monuments and memorials. The project has been used in educational and cultural contexts. A related Memory Monument sculpture was exhibited at Hudson Yards during NYCxDESIGN in 2024.

=== Art of This Century II (2022) ===
Moed was commissioned to design a reinterpretation of Peggy Guggenheim's experimental gallery, Art of This Century. The project focused on resurrecting the history of An Exhibition by 31 Women, the first all-women identifying art show in United States history, and was sited in the original building where the gallery existed in Midtown Manhattan.

=== The Matter of Memory (2023) ===
Moed co-curated and designed the exhibition The Matter of Memory: a Monument to Memory-Making at the Hazel & Robert H. Siegel Gallery at Pratt Institute. The exhibition featured built works and research by Moed and Richard Joon Yoo, exploring community-led memorialization processes. His related Memory Monument sculpture was exhibited at Hudson Yards for NYCxDESIGN in 2024 and was acquired by the New Museum Store.

== Awards and recognition ==
- Winner, BKLYN Incubator, Brooklyn Public Library (2022)
- Pedagogical Pioneers Fellowship, Pratt Institute School of Architecture (2022)
- MIT Sandbox Innovation Fund Grantee (2018–19)
- Wendy Evans Joseph Community Service Fellow, Harvard University (2018)
- Winner, DIA Urban Arts Competition, Jacksonville, Florida (2017)
- Winner, United Colors of Benetton 'Unemployee Of The Year' Campaign (2012)
