= Carlos Sampaio Garrido =

Portuguese diplomat (1883–1960)

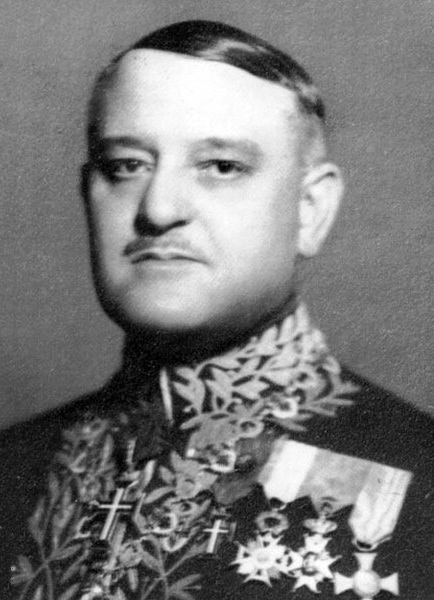
Carlos Sampaio Garrido

Carlos de Almeida Afonseca Sampaio Garrido (Note: Also rendered as Sampayo Garrido, as it was usually spelt in the 19th century.) GOC ComC OSE GOL (5 April 1883 – April 1960) was a Portuguese diplomat credited with saving the lives of approximately 1,000 Jews in Nazi-occupied Hungary while serving as Portugal's ambassador in Budapest between July and December 1944. In 2010, Yad Vashem recognized him as Righteous Among the Nations for his work in saving Jews during the Holocaust.

== Life and work ==
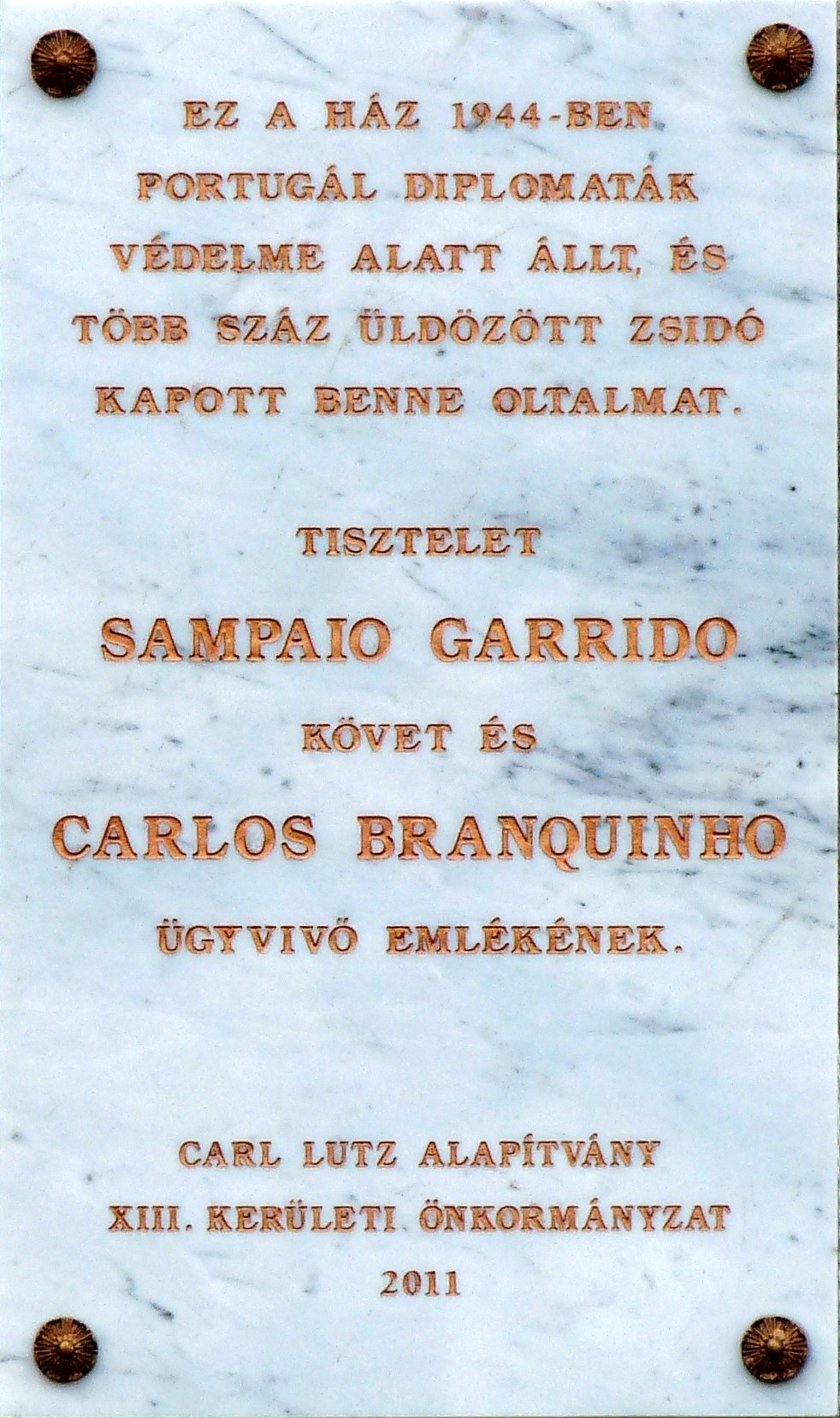
Commemorative plaque to Portuguese Ambassador Carlos Sampaio Garrido and Chargé d'affaires Teixeira Branquinho in mission to Budapest in 1944 for having rescued approximately 1,000 Hungarian Jews from the Holocaust. (Budapest, District XIII, Újpesti Quay Nr 5).

He served as Minister Plenipotentiary and acting Ambassador of Portugal in Budapest from 1939-44. Along with Teixeira Branquinho (Portuguese Chargé d'Affaires in Budapest in 1944), Garrido obtained permission from the Portuguese government to issue safe conduct passes to all persons who had relatives in Portugal, Brazil, or the Portuguese colonies or had a connection to Portugal. Garrido and Branquinho also established an office of the Portuguese Red Cross at the Portuguese legation to care for Jewish refugees.

After the Nazi invasion of Hungary, the Hungarian government ordered the embassies of neutral countries to rent houses outside the city for protection. Sampaio Garrido rented a house in Galgagyörk, 60 km from the city, where, without informing Salazar, he hid twelve Jews, including five members of the Gabor family—relatives of the actress Zsa Zsa Gabor.

Five days later, on 28 April 1944, at 5 a.m., the Hungarian political police raided the residence in Galgagyörk and arrested his guests. The Ambassador resisted the police action and immediately demanded the release of the detainees and an apology.

He was also arrested but managed to have his guests released by invoking the extraterritorial legal rights of diplomatic legations. Five of the guests were members from the famous Gabor family. Magda Gabor, Hungarian-born actress and socialite, and the elder sister of Zsa Zsa and Eva Gabor, was reported to have been the secretary, fiancée and lover of Sampaio Garrido.

Jolie Gabor, mother of the Gabor sisters, never forgot Magda's influential connections with rescuing her: "For Magda's Portuguese Ambassador I thank God. It was this man who saved my life."

As a result of this, Garrido became persona non-grata and had to cede his post to Teixeira Branquinho, his Chargé d'Affaires in Budapest. Although he left Budapest his work from Bern where he sent Branquinho lists of names for whom he requested assistance and asylum in the Portuguese legation. According to Mucznik, the two used courage and intelligence to circumvent Salazar's limitations on visas and were thus able to issue approximate 1,000 visas, of which 700 were provisional passports.

In 2010 he became the second Portuguese to be recognised as a Righteous Among the Nations by Yad Vashem; Aristides de Sousa Mendes having been recognised in 1966.

== Distinctions ==
=== National orders ===
- Grand Officer of the Order of Christ (5 October 1934)
- Commander of the Order of Christ (23 October 1932)
- Officer of the Order of Saint James of the Sword (27 October 1934)
- Grand Officer of the Order of Liberty (4 January 1996)

== See also ==
- List of individuals and groups assisting Jews during the Holocaust
- List of Righteous among the Nations by country
- InterContinental Budapest

== Sources ==
- Milgram, Avraham. Portugal, Salazar, and the Jews, translated by Naftali Greenwood. Jerusalem, Yad Vashem, 2011.
- Pimentel, Irene Flunser, Judeus em Portugal Durante a II Guerra Mundial, Lisbon: A Esfera do Livros, 2006; ISBN 9789896261054
- "Spared Lives: The Actions of Three Portuguese Diplomats in World War Documentary Exhibition, Catalogue". Portuguese Diplomatic Institute/Historical and Diplomatic Archive.
- "Spared Lives: The Actions of Three Portuguese Diplomats in World War Documentary Exhibition, Catalogue" (PDF). Raoul Wallenberg Foundation.
