= Carlos de Liz-Teixeira Branquinho =

Portuguese diplomat (1902–1971)

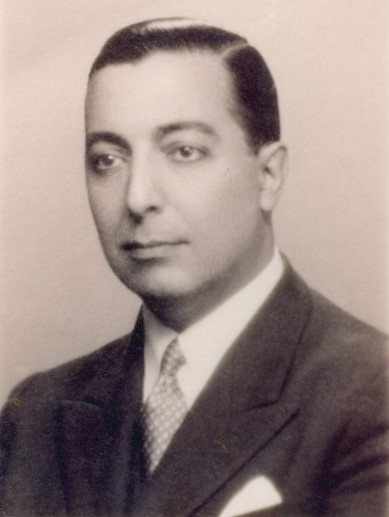
Teixeira Branquinho

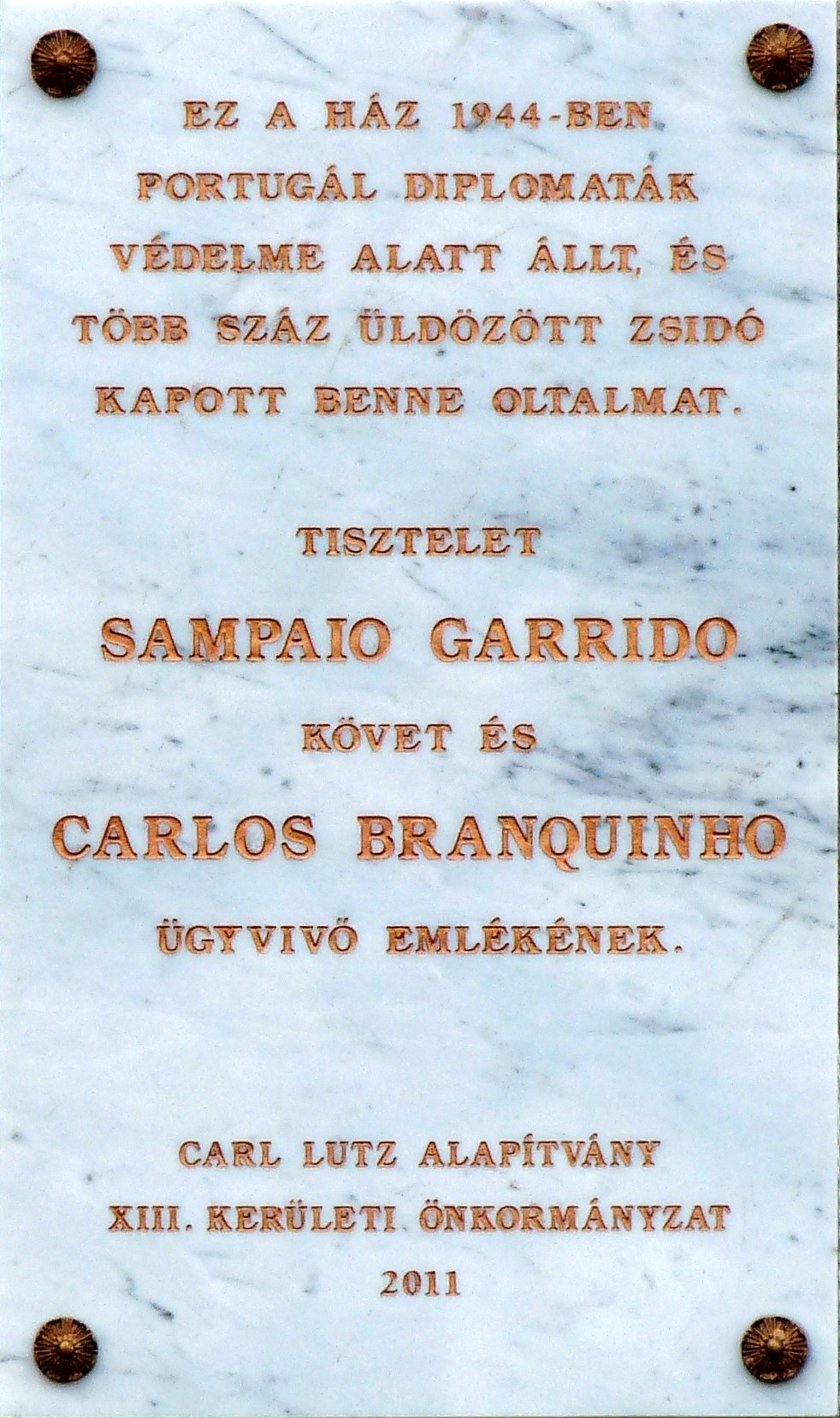
Commemorative plaque to Mr. Carlos Sampaio Garrido, Portugal ambassador and Mr. Teixeira Branquinho chargé d'affaires in mission to Budapest in 1944 who managed to rescue some thousands of Hungarian Jews from the Holocaust. (Budapest, District XIII, Újpesti Quay Nr 5).

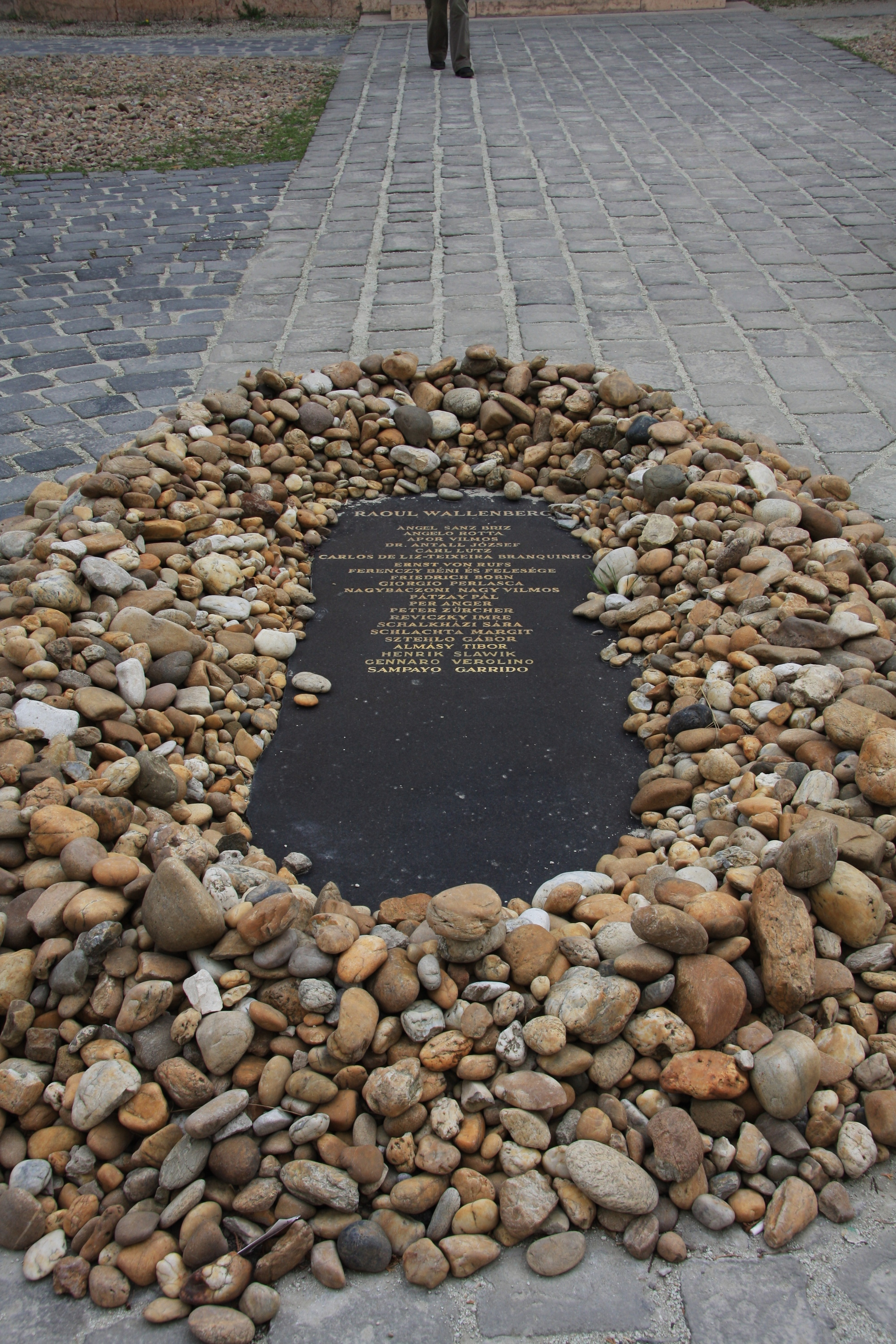
The Raoul Wallenberg-memorial at the Dohány Street Synagogue in Budapest

Alberto Carlos de Liz-Teixeira Branquinho OC ComL (27 January 1902 – 1973) was a Portuguese diplomat credited with saving the lives of 1,000 Jews in Nazi-occupied Hungary during the Holocaust from Hungarian Fascists and the Nazis during the later stages of World War II, while serving as Portugal’s Chargé d'Affaires in Budapest in 1944.

Along with Sampaio Garrido, he rented houses and apartments to shelter and protect refugees from deportation and murder. They obtained permission from the Portuguese government to issue safe conducts to all persons who had relatives in Portugal, Brazil, or the Portuguese colonies or had the most remote connection to Portugal. Garrido and Branquinho also established an office of the Portuguese Red Cross at the Portuguese legation to care for Jewish refugees. This was largely done in cooperation with the Portuguese Foreign Office and under Salazar’s direct supervision with the provision that these refugees would not try to get Portuguese citizenship.

On 23 April 1944 and following the German occupation of Hungary, the Portuguese ruler António de Oliveira Salazar decided to order his ambassador to return to Lisbon and leave Teixeira Branquinho as the chargé d'affaires, in his place. Garrido's recall was done in response to a request from Britain and the United States who wanted neutral countries to downgrade their diplomatic presence in Hungary. In direct contact with Salazar, Branquinho issued protective passports to hundreds of Jewish families. Altogether about 1,000 lives were saved due to his actions. Branquinho was recalled to Lisbon on 30 October 1944.

After the war Branquinho continued to serve his country as a diplomat in Washington, Jakarta, Paris, Caracas, Baghdad, Tehran and the Hague, where he acted with Ambassador’s credentials. He retired in 1966.

His name has been included in The Raoul Wallenberg-memorial at the Dohány Street Synagogue in Budapest.

Branquinho's case never gained the same level of recognition as did the Aristides de Sousa Mendes', another Portuguese diplomat credited with saving Jews from the holocaust. Branquinho's case differs from that of Sousa Mendes in several ways. He was deliberately acting to save Jews and not refugees in general. He was risking his life which was not the case with Sousa Mendes. He was in the heart of a Nazi regime, in 1944, when the Holocaust was at its peak, while Sousa Mendes was at Bordeaux in 1940 long before the Holocaust had started. Branquinho had full backing from Salazar.

Historian Tom Gallagher argues that Branquinho's case has been largely overlooked probably because he was coordinating his actions with Salazar and that weakens the core argument in the Sousa Mendes legend that he was defying a tyrannical superior. Gallagher argues that the disproportionate attention given to Sousa Mendes suggests that wartime history is in danger of being used in contemporary Portugal as a political weapon.

== Other Portuguese diplomats that saved people during the war ==
- Carlos Sampaio Garrido
- Aristides de Sousa Mendes
- Pedro Teotónio Pereira

== Distinctions ==
=== National orders ===
- Officer of the Military Order of Christ (7 February 1935)
- Commander of the Order of Liberty (4 January 1996)

== Sources ==
- "Spared Lives: The Actions of Three Portuguese Diplomats in World War Documentary Exhibition, Catalogue". Portuguese Diplomatic Institute / Historical and Diplomatic Archive.
- "Spared Lives: The Actions of Three Portuguese Diplomats in World War Documentary Exhibition, Catalogue" (PDF). Raoul Wallenberg Foundation/.
- Gallagher, Tom (2020). Salazar : the dictator who refused to die. C Hurst & Co Publishers Ltd. ISBN 978-1-78738-388-3.
- Milgram, Avraham (2011). Portugal, Salazar, and the Jews. Yad Vashem. p. 324. ISBN 9789653083875.
- Pimentel, Irene (2006). Judeus em Portugal Durante a II Guerra Mundial (in Portuguese). Lisbon: A Esfera do Livros. ISBN 9789896261054.
