= Cabanas de Viriato =

- Civil parish
- Location in Portugal
- Coordinates: 40.474°N 7.978°W
- Country: Portugal
- Region: Centro
- Intermunic. comm.: Viseu Dão Lafões
- District: Viseu
- Municipality: Carregal do Sal

Area
  - Total: 21.47 km^{2} (8.29 sq mi)

Population (2021)
  - Total: 1,457
  - Density: 68/km^{2} (180/sq mi)
- Time zone: UTC+00:00 (WET)
  - Summer (DST): UTC+01:00 (WEST)
- Postal code: 3430-600

Cabanas de Viriato is a town in the Carregal do Sal Municipality, Dão-Lafões Subregion of the Viseu District, in the Centro Region of Portugal. The population in 2025 was 1,698, in an area of 21.47 km^{2}.

== Towns ==
- Cabanas de Viriato
- Laceiras

== Geography ==
Cabanas de Viriato is located on a plateau in the former Beira Alta region facing south between the Serra do Caramulo and the Serra da Estrela. The town is about 30 kilometres from the district capital of Viseu and about 10 kilometres from Carregal do Sal.

In the older neighbourhoods of Cabanas de Viriato passes a small stream where several fountains have been built and the same stream flows into the Ribeira de Cabanas, which rises near the town of Laceiras. This village is located to the east of Cabanas de Viriato and is about 350 metres above sea level.

== Notable people ==
Aristides de Sousa Mendes, a Portuguese diplomat, helped thousands of war refugees escape from Nazi-occupied France to Portugal during the early years of World War II. Cabanas de Viriato is his birthplace and hometown and in the summer of 2024 his family home was transformed into a museum in his memory.

== Local Associations ==
- Cabanas de Viriato:
  - Associação do Carnaval de Cabanas de Viriato, organizes the traditional Dança dos Cus Carnival;
  - Sociedade Filarmónica de Cabanas de Viriato, founded in 1872;
  - Associação Humanitária dos Bombeiros Voluntários de Cabanas de Viriato; Humanitarian Association of Firefighters and founded on September 7, 1935;
  - Clube de Caça e Pesca de Cabanas de Viriato;
  - Associação Festas da Vila de Cabanas de Viriato, organizes the town's annual festivities;
  - Sport Cabanas de Viriato e Benfica, village soccer club and founded on January 4, 1930;
  - Fundação Aristides de Sousa Mendes;
  - Centro Social Elisa Barros Silva;
- Laceiras:
  - Associação Recreativa Cultural e Desportiva das Laceiras;

== Patrimony ==
- Public Art:
  - Cabanas de Viriato:
    - Busto de Dr. Anacleto de Soveral Soares de Albergaria, bust of the former administrator of Carregal do Sal town hall and this piece of public art was bought by Associação de Cabanas de Viriato em Lisboa;
    - Monumento "A Viriato", sculpture erected in 1998 as part of the celebrations for the 5th anniversary of the elevation of Cabanas de Viriato to town status;
    - Monumento em memória de Júlio de Barros Mendes, monument erected by the Junta de Freguesia de Cabanas de Viriato and located at the Garden Luis Silva e Silvestre Ferreira;
    - Busto de Aristides de Sousa Mendes, is located at the main entrance to the Escola (School) Aristides de Sousa Mendes;
    - Cristo Rei, built by Aristides de Sousa Mendes in 1933;

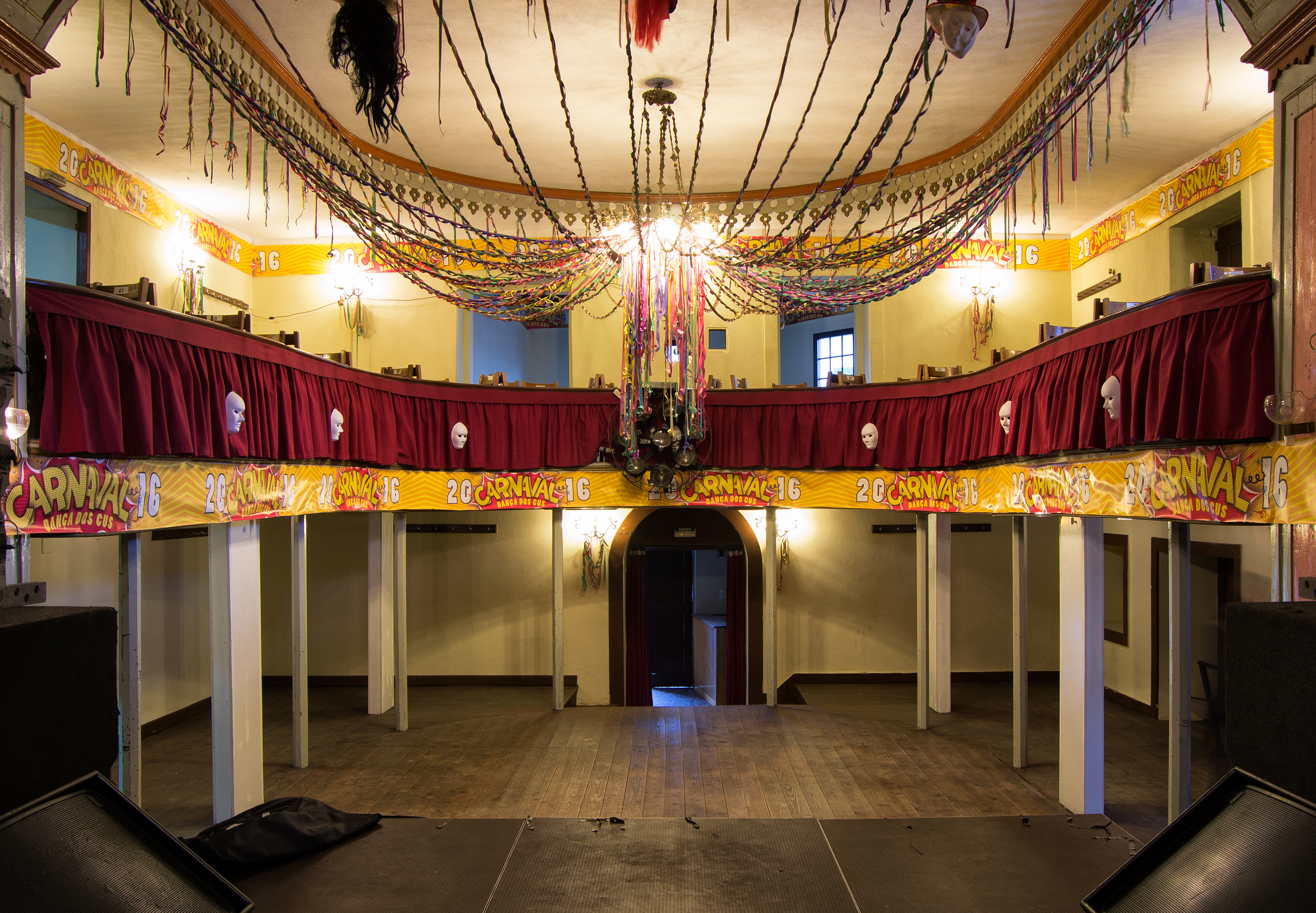
Teatro de Cabanas with decorations from the 2016 Carnival ball

- Cultural spaces:
  - Cabanas de Viriato:
    - Museu Aristides de Sousa Mendes, museum inaugurated on July 19, 2024 and located inside "Casa do Passal";
    - "Lagarto", property of Sociedade Filarmónica de Cabanas de Viriato;
    - Teatro de Cabanas, theater founded in 1884 and property of Associação Humanitária dos Bombeiros Voluntários de Cabanas de Viriato;

- Religious heritage:
  - Cabanas de Viriato:
    - Igreja São Cristóvão (St Christopher's Church);
    - Capela do Aido (Aido's Chapel), where Aristides de Sousa Mendes married his wife, Angelina de Sousa Mendes;
    - Capela Senhora do Amparo (Senhora do Amparo Chapel), located in the Pedrogão neighbourhood and is abandoned;
  - Laceiras:
    - Capela da Senhora dos Milagres (Chapel of the Lady of Miracles);
    - Capela de São Tiago (Chapel of Saint James);

== Events ==
- Sports events:
  - Cabanas de Viriato:
    - Cabanas CUP, organised by Sport Cabanas de Viriato e Benfica and part of the annual festivities of Cabanas de Viriato;
    - Football matches in the "Campeonato da 1ª divisão da Associação de Futebol de Viseu" organised at the stadium Sport Cabanas de Viriato e Benfica.

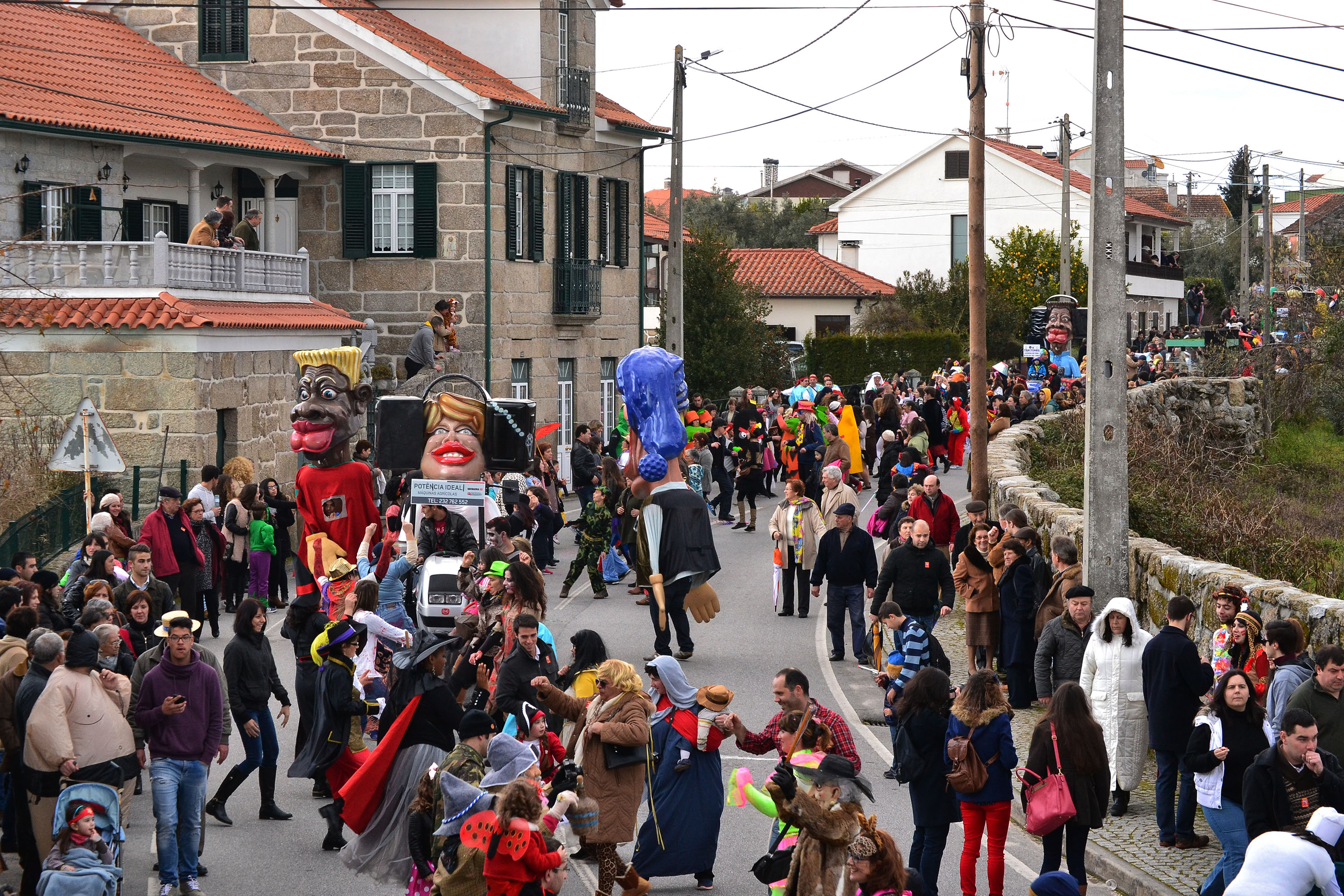
Traditional Carnaval Dança dos Cus in the Portuguese town of Cabanas de Viriato

- Cultural events:
  - Cabanas de Viriato:
    - Carnaval Dança dos Cus, was also known for Carnaval Dança Grande, organised by Associação do Carnaval de Cabanas de Viriato and one of the most genuine carnivals in Portugal;
    - Carnaval de Verão (Sunday of the second weekend in August), organised by Associação do Carnaval de Cabanas de Viriato and Associação Festas da Vila de Cabanas de Viriato;
- Gastronomic events:
  - Cabanas de Viriato:
    - Mega Cabidela, organised by Associação Humanitária dos Bombeiros Voluntários de Cabanas de Viriato;
    - Festival da Sopa e do Pão, organised by Agrupamento de Escolas de Carregal do Sal on the school grounds in Escola integrada de Aristides de Sousa Mendes;
- Music events:
  - Cabanas de Viriato:
    - Baile de Carnaval (Carnival Ball) in Teatro de Cabanas (Carnival Monday), organised by Associação Humanitária dos Bombeiros Voluntários de Cabanas de Viriato t is one of the highlights of the Carnaval Dança dos Cus.
    - Baile de Carnaval (Carnival Ball) en "Lagarto" (Carnival Sunday), organised by Sociedade Filarmónica de Cabanas de Viriato and inserted from the festivities of the Carnaval Dança dos Cus.;
    - Encontro de Cordas, organised by Sociedade Filarmónica de Cabanas de Viriato e with performances by several guest stringed-instrument ensembles;
    - Encontro de Bandas, organised by Sociedade Filarmónica de Cabanas de Viriato e with performances by various philharmonic bands;
    - Visita de Reis (Sunday of the first weekend in January), organised by Sociedade Filarmónica de Cabanas de Viriato;
- Religious events:
  - Cabanas de Viriato:
    - Feast in honour of São Cristóvão (End of July);
  - Laceiras:
    - Senhora dos Milagres (15 August);
    - Feast in honour of São Tiago;
- Other events:
  - Cabanas de Viriato:
    - Carnavalândia (last weekend in May or first weekend in June), organised by Associação do Carnaval de Cabanas de Viriato and is dedicated to the International Children's Day;
    - Cortejo das oferendas, organised by Associação Humanitária dos Bombeiros Voluntários de Cabanas de Viriato with raising funds from donations from the different populations in its area of action;
    - Festas da Vila (Second weekend in August), organised by Associação Festas da Vila de Cabanas de Viriato;
    - Pai Natal sobre Rodas (Santa Claus on wheels), organised by Associação Humanitária dos Bombeiros Voluntários de Cabanas de Viriato;
  - Laceiras:
    - Passeio motorizadas, low-displacement motorbike trip organised by the Associação Recreativa Cultural e Desportiva das Laceiras and part of the festival in honour of Senhora dos Milagres;

== Politics ==
- Junta de Freguesia de Cabanas de Viriato:
  - 2021 a 2025:
    - President of the Junta, Nuno Seabra;
    - Secretary, Ana Rita Fidalgo;
    - Treasurer, José António Marques;
- Assembleia de Freguesia de Cabanas de Viriato:
  - 2021 a 2025:
    - Assembly of the assembleia:
      - President of the assembleia, Fernando Pereira;
      - First secretary, Stefanie Tomás;
      - Second secretary, Bárbara Costa;
    - Elements of the assembleia:
      - Célia Costa;
      - António Tavares;
      - Gustavo Costa;
      - Mário Campos;
      - José Figueiredo;
      - Rosa Ribeiro;

- Previous Presidents of Junta de Freguesia:
  - Júlio de Barros Mendes;
  - José de Barros Figueiredo;
  - José Rui Pessoa;
  - Olímpio Dias Tavares;
