= Aristides de Sousa Mendes =

Portuguese diplomat and national hero (1885–1954)

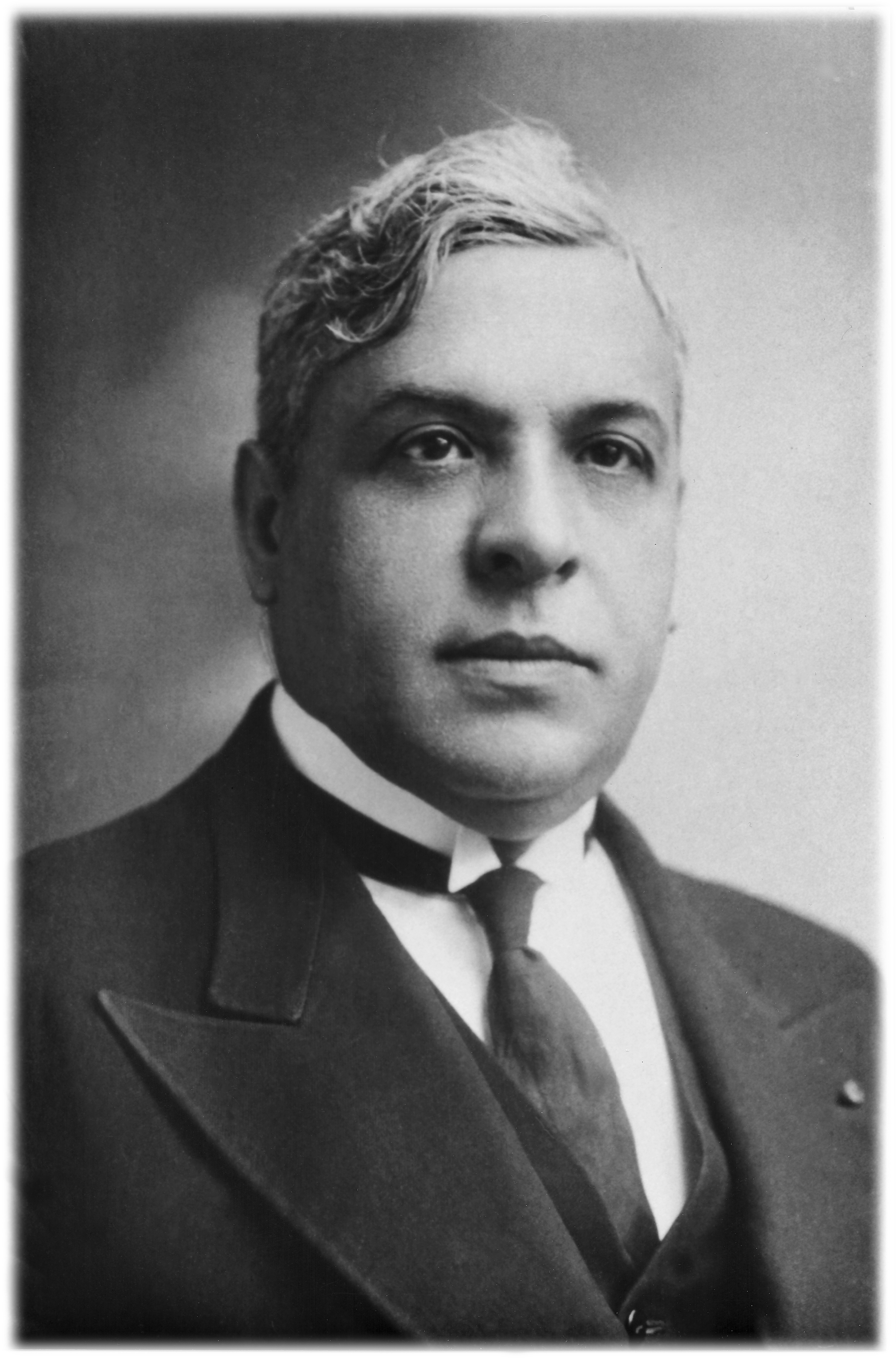
- Aristides de Sousa Mendes in 1940
- Born: Aristides de Sousa Mendes do Amaral e Abranches; July 19, 1885; Cabanas de Viriato, Viseu, Kingdom of Portugal
- Died: April 3, 1954 (aged 68); Lisbon, Portugal
- Citizenship: Portuguese
- Education: University of Coimbra
- Occupation: Consul
- Known for: Saving the lives of thousands of refugees seeking to escape Nazi terror during World War II
- Spouses: Maria Angelina Coelho de Sousa (m. 1908; died 1948) Andrée Cibial (m. 1949)
- Children: With Marie Angelina Coelho de Sousa: Aristides César, Manuel Silvério, José António, Clotilde Augusta, Isabel Maria, Feliciano Artur Geraldo, Elisa Joana, Pedro Nuno, Carlos Francisco Fernando, Sebastião Miguel Duarte, Teresinha Menino Jesus, Luís Filipe, João Paulo, Raquel Herminia; With Andrée Cibial: Marie-Rose
- Parents: José de Sousa Mendes (father); Maria Angelina Coelho Ribeiro (mother)

Aristides de Sousa Mendes do Amaral e Abranches GCC OL (European Portuguese pronunciation: [ɐɾiʃˈtiðɨʒ ðɨ ˈsozɐ ˈmẽdɨʃ]; July 19, 1885 – April 3, 1954) was a Portuguese diplomat who is recognized as a national hero for his actions during World War II. As the Portuguese consul-general in the French city of Bordeaux, he defied the orders of António de Oliveira Salazar's Estado Novo regime, issuing visas to thousands of refugees fleeing Nazi-occupied France, including Jews.

As a result of his actions, Sousa Mendes was recalled to Portugal and stood trial for defying the regime. He was punished with demotion and forced retirement. He was unable to find other employment and died in poverty in 1954. For his efforts to save Jewish refugees, Sousa Mendes was recognized by Israel as one of the Righteous Among the Nations in 1966, the first diplomat to be so honored. Sousa Mendes is considered one of the greatest heroes of World War II. Holocaust scholar Yehuda Bauer characterized Sousa Mendes' deeds as "perhaps the largest rescue action by a single individual during the Holocaust."

In 1987, more than a decade after the Carnation Revolution, which toppled the Estado Novo, he was awarded the prestigious Order of Liberty. In 1988, the Portuguese national assembly voted unanimously for his rehabilitation and his charges were dismissed. In 1995, President Mário Soares declared Sousa Mendes to be "Portugal's greatest hero of the twentieth century." In 2007, the Portuguese TV program Os Grandes Portugueses voted Sousa Mendes the third greatest Portuguese person of all time. In 2020, Sousa Mendes was inducted into the National Pantheon in Lisbon, with a ceremony held the following year, presided by the president. In 2024, the Aristides de Sousa Mendes Museum was inaugurated in Cabanas de Viriato, his hometown.

== Early life ==
Aristides de Sousa Mendes was born in Cabanas de Viriato, in the district of Viseu, Centro Region of Portugal, in July 1885 together with his twin brother César, to a family of aristocrats. Their mother, Maria Angelina Coelho Ribeiro, was a granddaughter of the 2nd Viscount of Midões, a lower rural aristocracy title. Their father, José de Sousa Mendes, was a judge on the Coimbra Court of Appeals. César served as Foreign Minister in 1932, in the early days of António de Oliveira Salazar's regime. Their younger brother, Jose Paulo, became a naval officer.

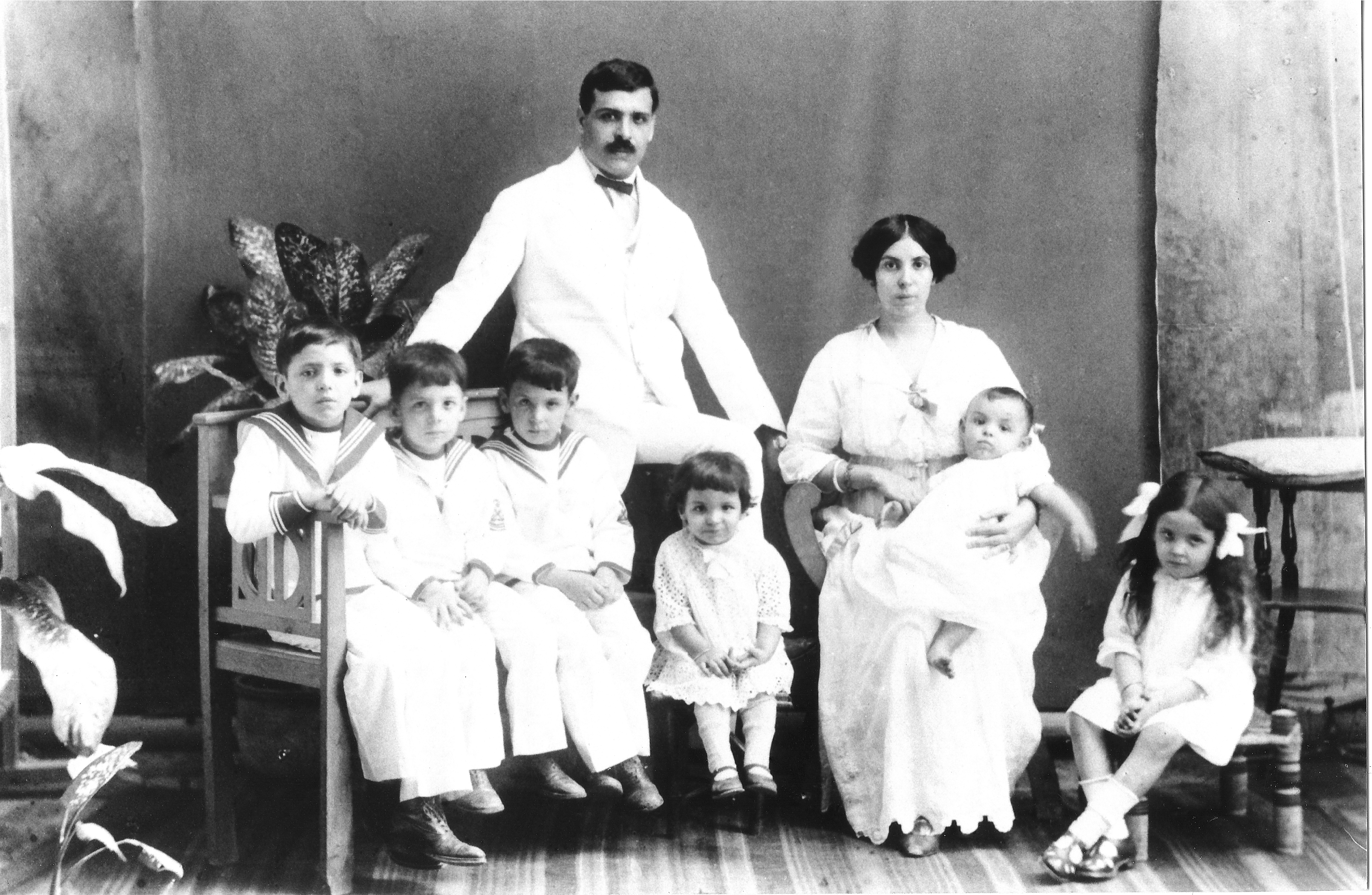
Aristides and Angelina de Sousa Mendes with their first six children, 1917.

Sousa Mendes and his twin studied law at the University of Coimbra, and each obtained his degree in 1908. In that same year, Sousa Mendes married his childhood sweetheart, Maria Angelina Coelho de Sousa Mendes (born August 20, 1888), who was also his cousin. They eventually had fourteen children, born in the various countries in which he served. Shortly after his marriage, Sousa Mendes began his diplomatic career that would take him and his family around the world. On 12 May 1910, Aristides was appointed consul in the city of Demerara, British Guiana. He was then consul in Zanzibar (1911-1918), Curitiba (1918–1919), San Francisco (1921-1924), S. Luís do Maranhão (April 1924), Porto Alegre (1924-1926), Vigo (1927-1929), Antwerp (1929-1938).

In 1938, he was assigned to the post of Consul-General of Bordeaux, France, with jurisdiction over the whole of southwestern France.

== World War II and Circular 14 ==
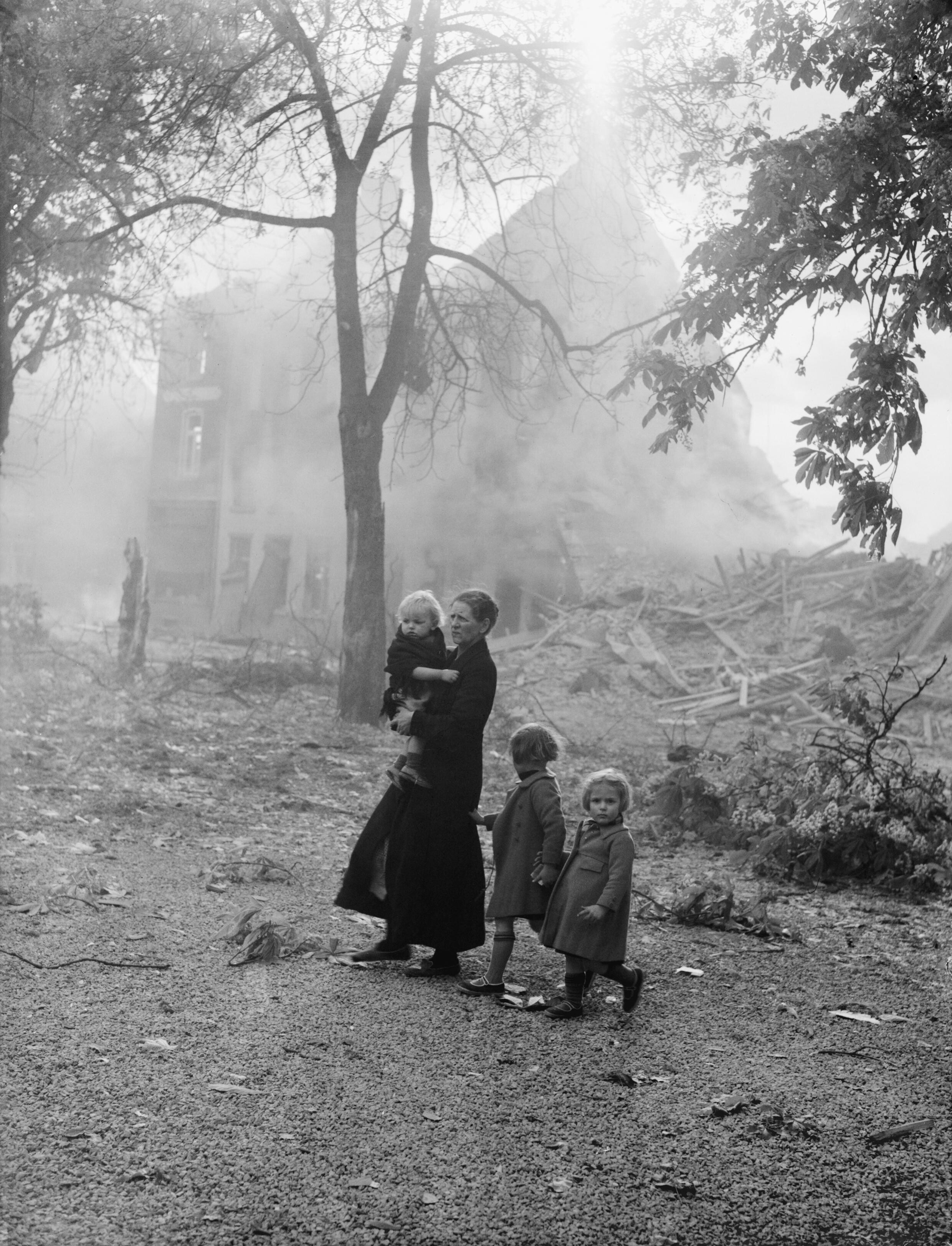
Refugees in Belgium, May 1940.

In 1932, the Portuguese dictatorship of António de Oliveira Salazar began, and by 1933, the secret police, known as Surveillance and State Defense Police, or PIDE, had been created. According to historian Avraham Milgram, by 1938, Salazar "knew the Nazis' approach to the 'Jewish question'. From fears that refugees might undermine the regime, entry to Portugal was severely limited. Toward this end, the apparatus of the PIDE was extended with its International Department given greater control over border patrol and the entry of refugees . Presumably, most aliens wishing to enter Portugal at that time were Jews." Portugal during World War II, like its European counterparts, adopted tighter immigration policies, preventing refugees from settling in the country. Circular 10, of 28 October 1938, addressed to consular representatives, deemed that settling was forbidden to Jews, allowing entrance only on a tourist visa for thirty days.

On 1 September 1939, Nazi Germany invaded Poland, leading France and the United Kingdom to declare war on Germany, precipitating the start of World War II.

The number of refugees trying to make use of Portugal's neutrality as an escape route increased, and between the months of September and December approximately 9,000 refugees entered Portugal.

On 11 November 1939, the Portuguese government sent Circular 14 to all Portuguese consuls throughout Europe, stating the categories of war refugees whom the PVDE considered to be "inconvenient or dangerous." The categories included “Jews expelled from their countries or those from whence they issue, stateless persons, and all those who cannot freely return to the countries whence they come."

== Sousa Mendes' disobedience to the orders of the Salazar dictatorship ==
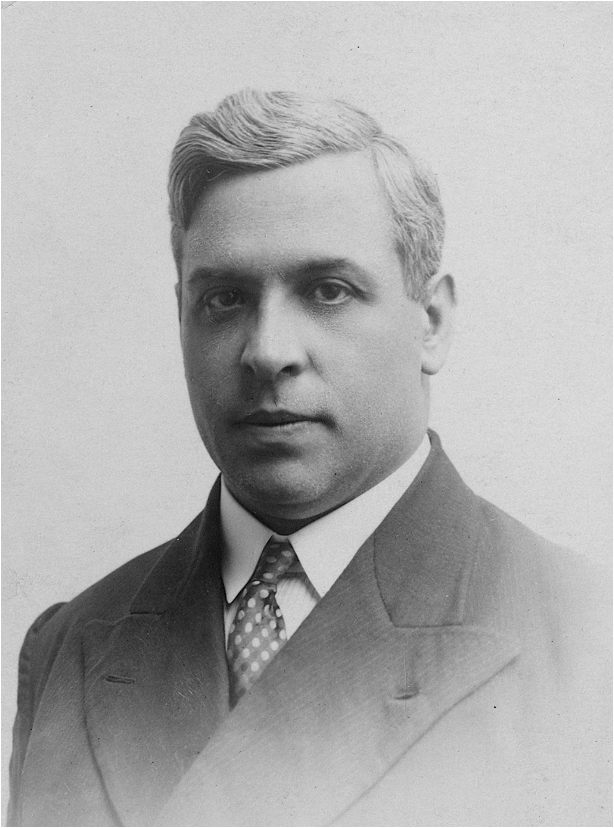
Aristides de Sousa Mendes, 1940.

Sousa Mendes began disobeying Circular 14 almost immediately, on the grounds that it was an inhumane and racist directive.

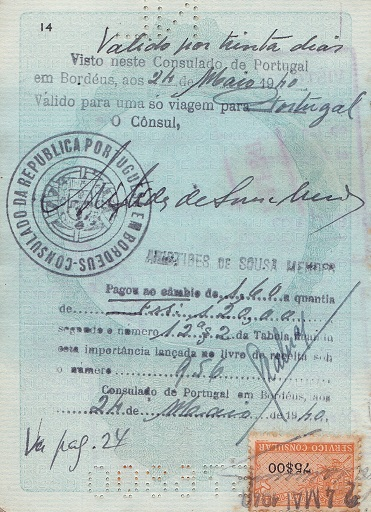
Life saving visa issued by Aristides de Sousa Mendes to Annelies Kaufmann, age 15, on May 24, 1940.

The process that ended with Sousa Mendes' discharge from his consular career began with two visas: the first was issued on 28 November 1939 to Professor Arnold Wiznitzer, an Austrian historian who had been stripped of his nationality by the Nuremberg Laws, and the second on 1 March 1940 to the Spanish Republican Eduardo Neira Laporte, an anti-Franco activist living in France. Sousa Mendes granted the visas first, and only after granting the visas did he ask for the required approvals. Sousa Mendes was reprimanded and warned in writing that "any new transgression or violation on this issue will be considered disobedience and will entail a disciplinary procedure where it will not be possible to overlook that you have repeatedly committed acts which have entailed warnings and reprimands."

When Sousa Mendes issued these visas, it was a deliberate act of disobedience to the decree of an authoritarian dictatorship. "Here was a unique act by a man who believed his religion imposed certain obligations", said Mordecai Paldiel, former Director (1984–2007) of the Department of the Righteous Among the Nations at Yad Vashem in Jerusalem. "He said, 'I'm saving innocent lives,' as simply as he might have said, 'Come, walk with me in my garden.'"

On 15 May, Sousa Mendes issued transit visas to Maria Tavares, a Luxembourg citizen of Portuguese origin, and to her husband Paul Miny, also a Luxembourger. Two weeks later, the couple returned to the Bordeaux Consulate asking Sousa Mendes to issue them false papers. Sousa Mendes agreed to their request, and on 30 May 1940, he issued a Portuguese passport listing Paul Miny as Maria's brother, therefore as having Portuguese citizenship. This time Sousa Mendes risked himself a great deal more than he had before; disobeying Circular 14 was one thing, but issuing a passport with a false identity to someone of military age was a crime. Sousa Mendes later provided the following explanation: "This couple asked me for a Portuguese passport, where they would figure as brother and sister, for fear that the husband, who was still of military age, would be detained on passing the French border, and incorporated in the Luxembourg army then being organized in France."

There were other cases from May 1940 where Sousa Mendes disobeyed Circular 14. Examples include issuing visas to the Ertag, Flaksbaum and Landesman families, all granted on 29 May, despite having been rejected in a telegram from the Portuguese dictator Salazar to Sousa Mendes. Another example is the writer Gisèle Quittner, rejected by Salazar but rescued by Sousa Mendes, to whom she expressed her gratitude: "You are Portugal's best propaganda and an honor to your country. All those who know you praise your courage...."

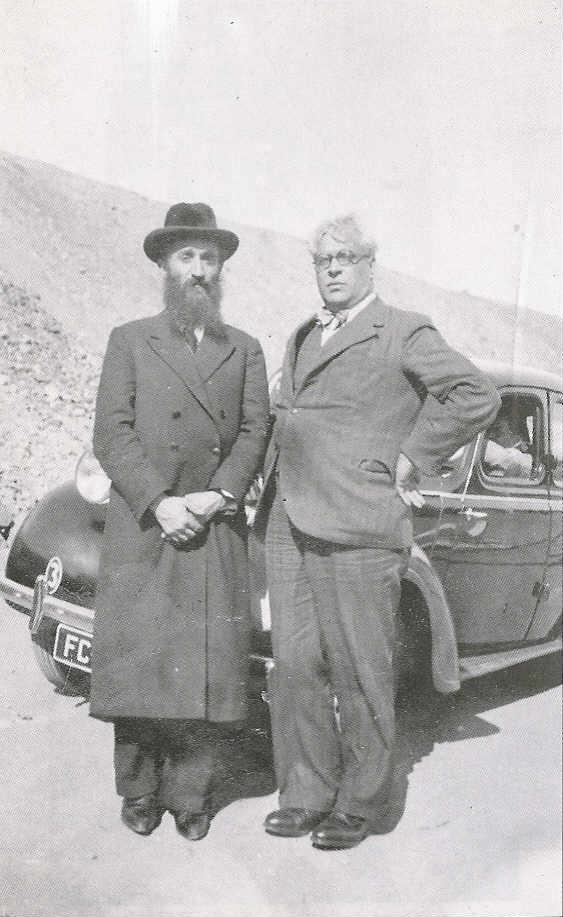
Rabbi Chaim Tzvi Kruger with Aristides de Sousa Mendes, 1940.

As the German army approached Paris, Bordeaux and other southern French cities were overrun by desperate refugees. One of these was a Hassidic Rabbi, Chaim Kruger, originally from Poland but more recently from Brussels, escaping with his wife and five children. Kruger and Sousa Mendes met by chance in Bordeaux, and quickly became friends. Sousa Mendes offered a visa to the Kruger family in defiance of Circular 14. In response, Kruger took a moral stand and refused to accept the visa unless all of his "brothers and sisters" (the mass of Jewish refugees stranded on the streets of Bordeaux) received visas too. Kruger's response plunged Sousa Mendes into "a moral crisis of incalculable proportions."

In mid-June (exact date a matter of debate), Sousa Mendes emerged from his seclusion, impelled by "a divine power," with his decision made. According to his son Pedro Nuno, "My father got up, and announced in a loud voice: 'From now on I'm giving everyone visas. There will be no more nationalities, races or religions.' Then our father told us that he had heard a voice, that of his conscience or of God, which dictated to him what course of action he should take, and that everything was clear in his mind."

His daughter Isabel and her husband Jules strongly opposed his decision, and tried to dissuade him from what they considered to be a fatal mistake. But Sousa Mendes did not listen to them and instead began to work intensively to grant the visas. "I would rather stand with God and against man than with man and against God," he reportedly explained. He set up an assembly line process, aided by his wife, sons Pedro Nuno and José Antonio, his secretary José Seabra, Rabbi Kruger, and a few other refugees.

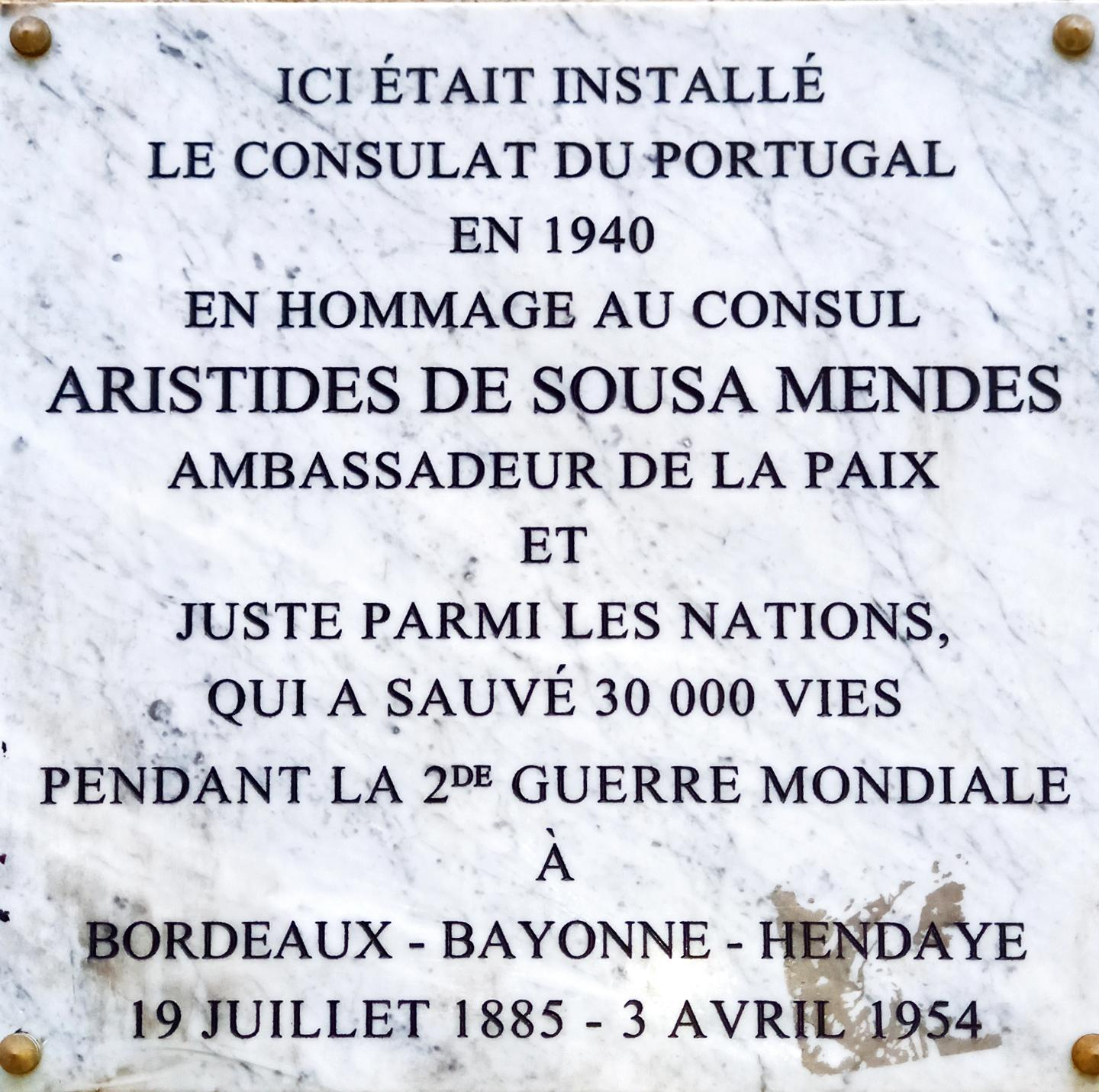
Plaque in Bayonne, France, reading: "Here was installed the Consulate of Portugal in 1940, in homage to Consul Aristides de Sousa Mendes, Ambassador of Peace and Righteous Among the Nations, who saved 30,000 lives during World War II in Bordeaux, Bayonne, Hendaye. 19 July 1885-3 April 1954".

After Bordeaux was bombed by the Wehrmacht on the night of 19–20 June 1940, the demand for Portuguese visas intensified, not only in Bordeaux but also in Bayonne, nearer to the Spanish border. Sousa Mendes rushed to the Portuguese Consulate in Bayonne, which was under his jurisdiction, to relieve the consul Faria Machado, who was refusing to grant visas to the crush of refugees.

In issuing visas at the Bayonne consulate, Sousa Mendes was aided by the Bayonne vice-consul, Manuel de Vieira Braga. Faria Machado, a Salazar loyalist in charge of the Bayonne consulate, reported this behaviour to Portugal's ambassador to Spain, Pedro Teotónio Pereira. Teotónio Pereira, another Salazar loyalist, promptly set out for the French-Spanish border to put a stop to this activity. After observing Sousa Mendes' action, Teotónio Pereira sent a telegram to the Lisbon authorities in which he described Sousa Mendes as being "out of his mind" and also said that Sousa Mendes' "disorientation has made a great impression on the Spanish side with a political campaign against Portugal being created immediately accusing our country of giving shelter to the scum of the democratic regimes and defeated elements fleeing before the German victory." He declared Sousa Mendes to be mentally incompetent and, acting on Salazar's authority, he invalidated all further visas.

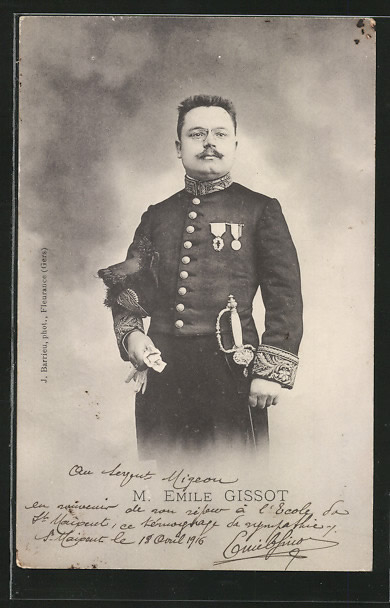
Emile Gissot, honorary Portuguese Vice-Consul in Toulouse, France.

Sousa Mendes continued on to Hendaye to assist there, thus narrowly missing two cablegrams from Lisbon sent on 22 June to Bordeaux, ordering him to stop even as France's armistice with Germany became official. Sousa Mendes ordered the honorary Portuguese vice-consul in Toulouse, Emile Gissot, to issue transit visas to all who applied.

On 22 June the armistice between France and Germany was signed whereby two-thirds of France was to be occupied by the Germans and more people tried to leave France via Spain. The New York Times reported that some 10,000 persons attempting to cross over into Spain were excluded because authorities no longer granted recognition to their visas: "Portugal announced that Portuguese visas granted at Bordeaux were invalid, and Spain was permitting bearers of these documents to enter only in exceptional cases."

On 24 June, Salazar recalled Sousa Mendes to Portugal, an order he received upon returning to Bordeaux on 26 June but he complied slowly, arriving in Portugal on 8 July. Along the way, he continued issuing Portuguese visas to refugees now trapped in occupied France, and even led a large group to a remote border post that had not received Lisbon's order. His son, John-Paul Abranches, told the story: "As his diplomatic car reached the French border town of Hendaye, my father encountered a large group of stranded refugees for whom he had previously issued visas. Those people had been turned away because the Portuguese government had phoned the guards, commanding 'Do not honor Mendes's signature on visas.'... Ordering his driver to slow down, Father waved the group to follow him to a border checkpoint that had no telephones. In the official black limousine with its diplomatic license tags, Father led those refugees across the border toward freedom."

== Disciplinary proceeding and punishment ==
Upon returning to Portugal in early July 1940, Sousa Mendes was subjected to a disciplinary proceeding that has been described as "a severe crackdown" and "a merciless disciplinary process." The charges against him included: "the violation of Circular 14; the order to the consul in Bayonne to issue visas to all those who asked for them 'with the claim that it was necessary to save all these people'; the order given to the consul in Bayonne to distribute visas free of charge; the permission given by telephone to the consul in Toulouse that he could issue visas; acting in a way that was dishonorable for Portugal vis-à-vis the Spanish and German authorities."; the confessed passport forgery to help Luxembourger Paul Miny escape army mobilization; abandoning his post at Bordeaux without authorization and extortion, this latest one based on the accusation made by the British Embassy.

The accusation asserted that "an atmosphere of panic does in fact provide an extenuating circumstance for the acts committed by the Defendant during the month of June and possibly even for those committed in the second half of the month of May..., however, the acts committed during that period are no more than a repetition or extension of a procedure that already existed, for which the same extenuating circumstance cannot be invoked. There had been infractions and repetitions long before 15 May... This is the 4th case of disciplinary proceedings brought against the Defendant."

Sousa Mendes submitted his response to the charges on 12 August 1940, in which he clarified his motivation:

It was indeed my aim to save all those people whose suffering was indescribable: some had lost their spouses, others had no news of missing children, others had seen their loved ones succumb to the German bombings which occurred every day and did not spare the terrified refugees... There was another aspect that should not be overlooked: the fate of many people if they fell into the hands of the enemy... eminent people of many countries with whom we have always been on excellent terms: statesmen, ambassadors and ministers, generals and other high officers, professors, men of letters,... officers from armies of countries that had been occupied, Austrians, Czechs and Poles, who would be shot as rebels; there were also many Belgians, Dutch, French, Luxembourgers and even English.... Many were Jews who were already persecuted and sought to escape the horror of further persecution. Finally an endless number of women attempting to avoid being at the mercy of Teutonic sensuality. I could not differentiate between nationalities as I was obeying the dictates of humanity that distinguish between neither race nor nationality; as for the charge of dishonorable conduct, when I left Bayonne I was applauded by hundreds of people, and through me it was Portugal that was being honored."

On 19 October 1940, the verdict was handed down: "disobeying higher orders during service." The disciplinary board recommended a demotion. On 30 October 1940, Salazar rejected this recommendation and imposed his own sentence: "I sentence Consul First Class, Aristides de Sousa Mendes, to a penalty of one year of inactivity with the right to one half of his rank's pay, being obliged subsequently to be retired." He further ordered that all files in the case be sealed.

There was also an unofficial punishment: the blacklisting and social banishment of Aristides de Sousa Mendes and his family. "My grandfather... knew there would be some retribution, but to lose everything and have the family disgraced, he never thought it would go that far", said the hero's grandson, also named Aristides.

Due to their dire straits the family took meals at the soup kitchen of the Jewish community of Lisbon. When told that the soup kitchen was intended for refugees, Sousa Mendes replied, "But we too are refugees."

After the war, with the victory of the Allied forces over the Axis, Salazar took credit for Portugal having received the refugees, and the Portuguese history books were written accordingly. Manuela Franco, Director of the Portuguese Foreign Ministry archives, stated in 2000 that "the image of 'Portugal, a safe haven' was born then in Bordeaux, and it lasts to this day."

== Last years ==
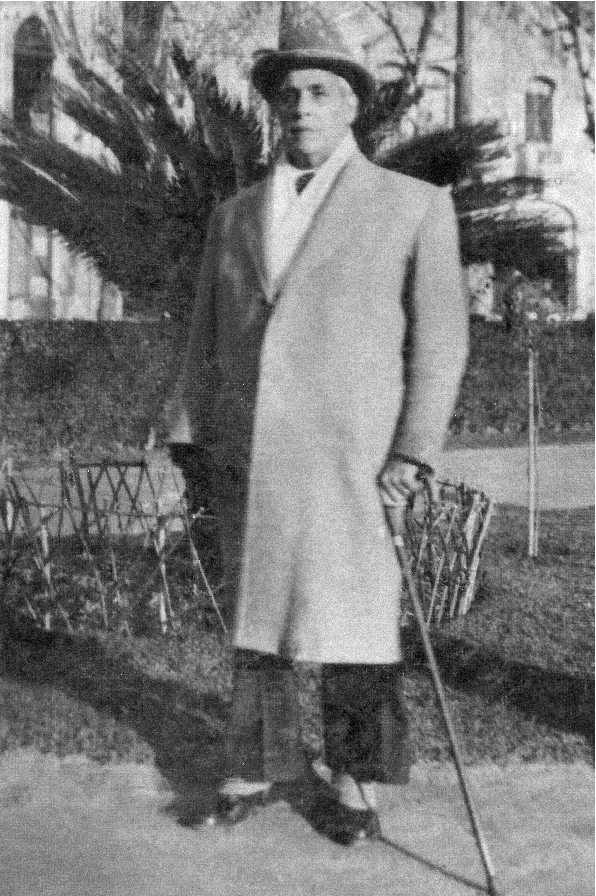
Aristides de Sousa Mendes, 1950

Throughout the war years and beyond, Sousa Mendes was optimistic that his punishment would be reversed and his deed would be recognized. In a 1945 letter to the Portuguese Parliament, he explained that he had disobeyed orders because he had considered them to be unconstitutional, as the Portuguese Constitution forbade discrimination on the basis of religion. He had not stated this during the war, because, as a public official, he did not want to attract publicity and therefore compromise Portugal's neutrality.

In 1946, a Portuguese journalist tried to raise awareness for Sousa Mendes outside of Portugal by publishing the facts under a pseudonym in a US newspaper.

Sousa Mendes' wife Angelina died in 1948. The following year he married Andrée Cibial, with whom he had a daughter, Marie-Rose.

As his financial situation deteriorated, he would sometimes write to the people he had helped asking for money. On one occasion, Maurice de Rothschild sent him 30,000 Portuguese escudos, a considerable amount of money in Portugal at that time.

César de Sousa Mendes, twin brother of Aristides, did everything he could to try to get Salazar to reverse his punishment, but to no avail.

Sousa Mendes died in poverty on 3 April 1954, owing money to his lenders and still in disgrace with his government.

== Number of visa recipients ==
There are different views regarding the number of visas issued by Sousa Mendes. Historian Avraham Milgram, in his 2011 book, Portugal, Salazar, and the Jews, thinks that it was probably the lawyer Harry Ezratty who was the first to mention in a Jewish Life article published in 1964 that Sousa Mendes had saved 30,000 refugees, of whom 10,000 were Jews. Milgram says that Ezratty, took the total number of Jewish refugees who passed through Portugal and ascribed it to the work of Aristides de Sousa Mendes.

Milgram states that while the number is lower than that, Sousa Mendes "issued thousands of visas to refugees". He cross-checked the numbers from the Bordeaux visa register entry books with those of the HICEM reports, but also acknowledges that visas delivered in the cities of Bayonne, Hendaye and Toulouse cannot be exactly determined. He also states that most of the Jews who crossed the Pyrenees into Spain and then to Portugal did so thanks to Sousa Mendes.

Both Milgram and British historian Neill Lochery state that the number of visas issued between January 1 and July 22 in Bordeaux alone (excluding Bayonne etc) is 2862.

Rui Afonso, the first Sousa Mendes biographer, also states that during the three days from June 17 to 19, thousands of visas were issued. The only dissenting voice is that of José Seabra, Sousa Mendes' deputy at Bordeaux, who owed his position of secretary of the consulate to Sousa Mendes, but disapproved of these "irregularities" in which he was forced to participate. In response to a ministry investigation carried out fifty years later (May 22, 1987), José Seabra mentioned only a few hundred visas.

On the other hand, as a reaction to Milgram's assertions, French writer, Eric Lebreton, argues that "Milgram did not account for the visas that were delivered in Bayonne, Hendaye, and Toulouse, and on the other hand, he [Milgram] holds firm to the number presented in the one surviving registry book of José Seabra (Sousa Mendes' deputy). According to Lebreton, Milgram's article, while very interesting in other ways, lacks details and knowledge on this point."

In 2015, Olivia Mattis published the findings of the Sousa Mendes Foundation identifying 3900 recipients of visas by name and argued that combining those individuals with others whose names are not known leads to the conclusion that "tens of thousands" of visa recipients is a figure of the correct order of magnitude.

== Posthumous rehabilitation and recognition ==
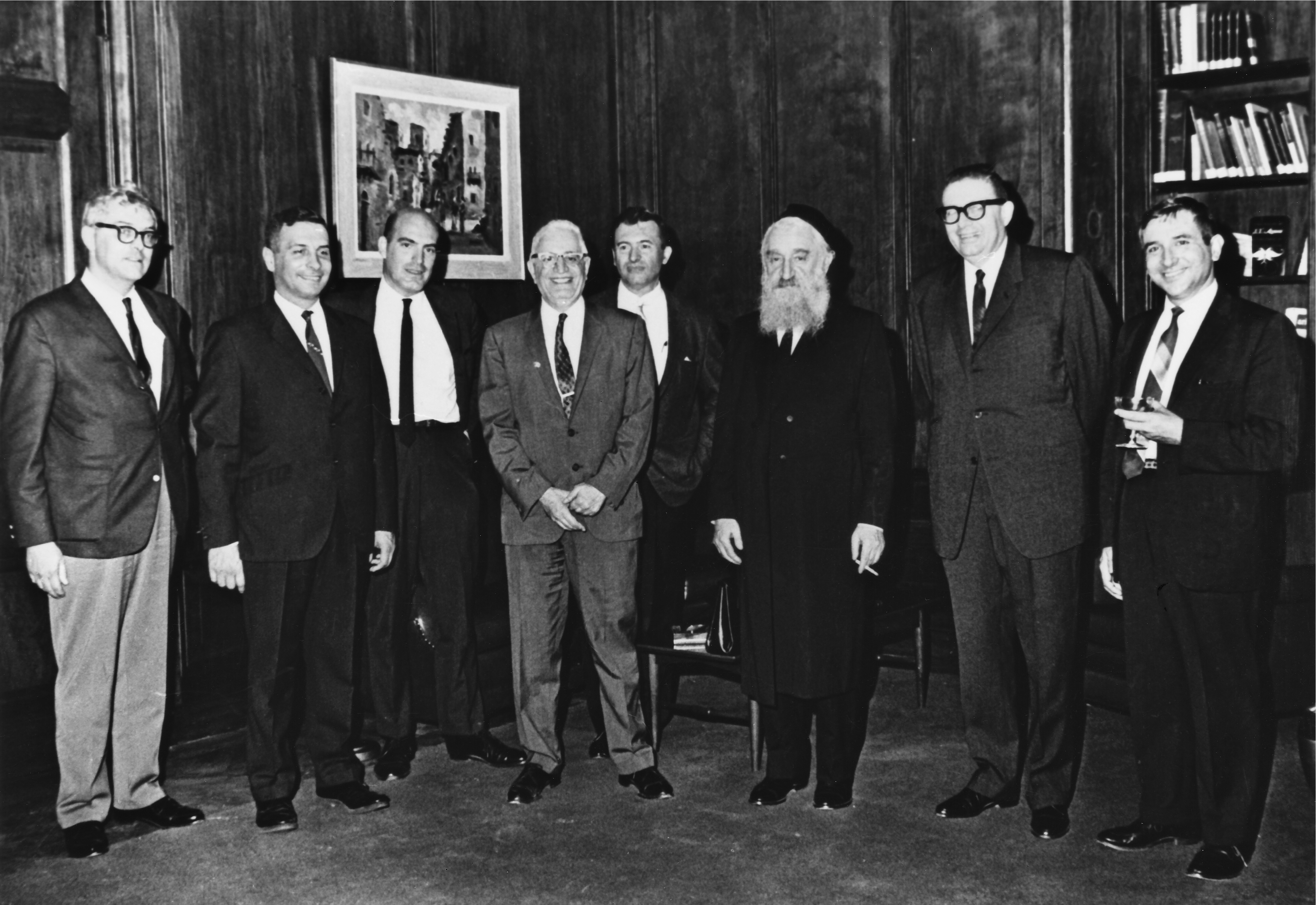
Yad Vashem ceremony in honor of Aristides de Sousa Mendes.

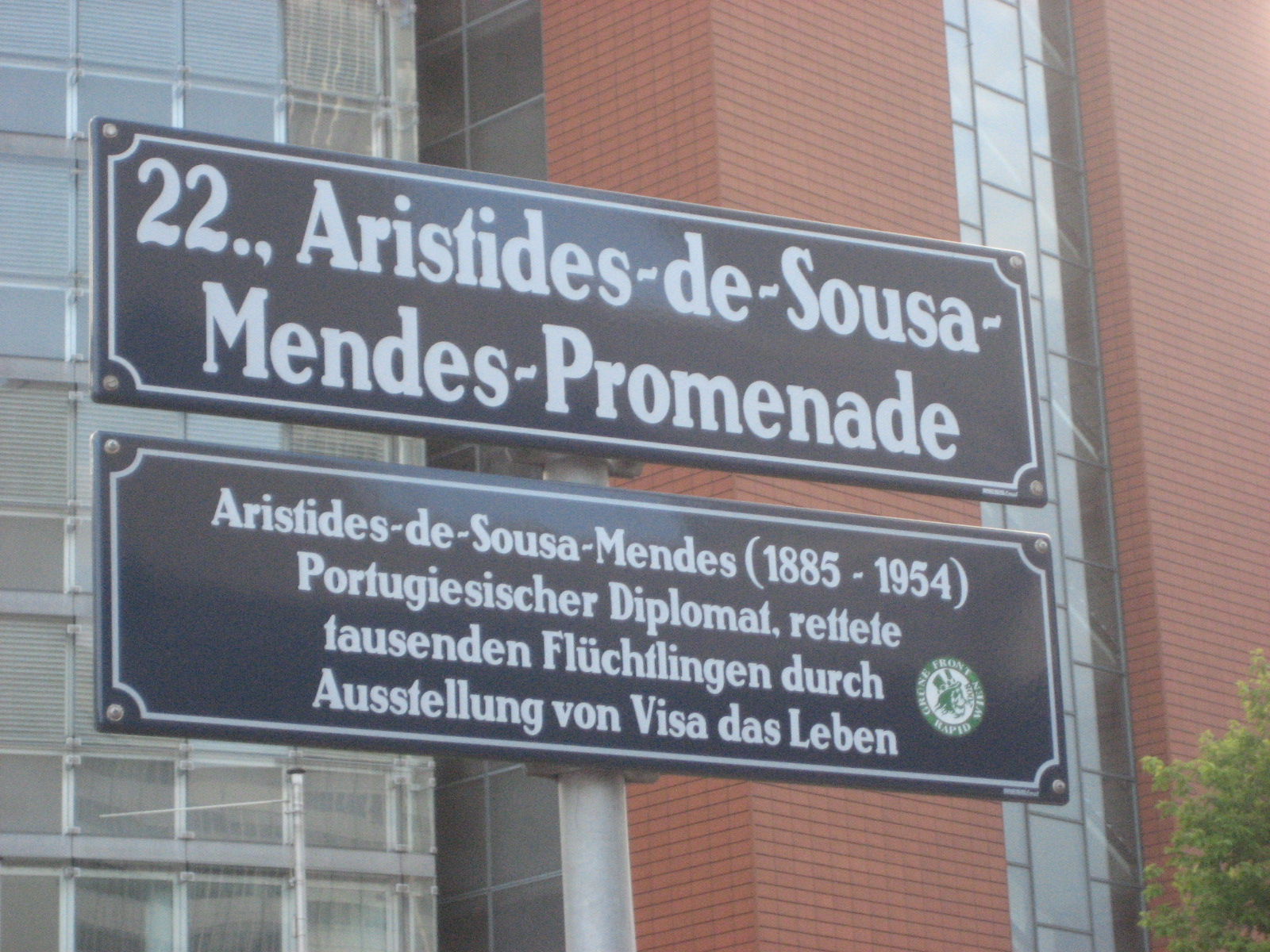
Aristides de Sousa Mendes Promenade in Vienna, inaugurated on January 18, 2000, reading: Aristides de Sousa Mendes (1885–1954), Portuguese diplomat, saved thousands of refugees by issuing life-saving visas.

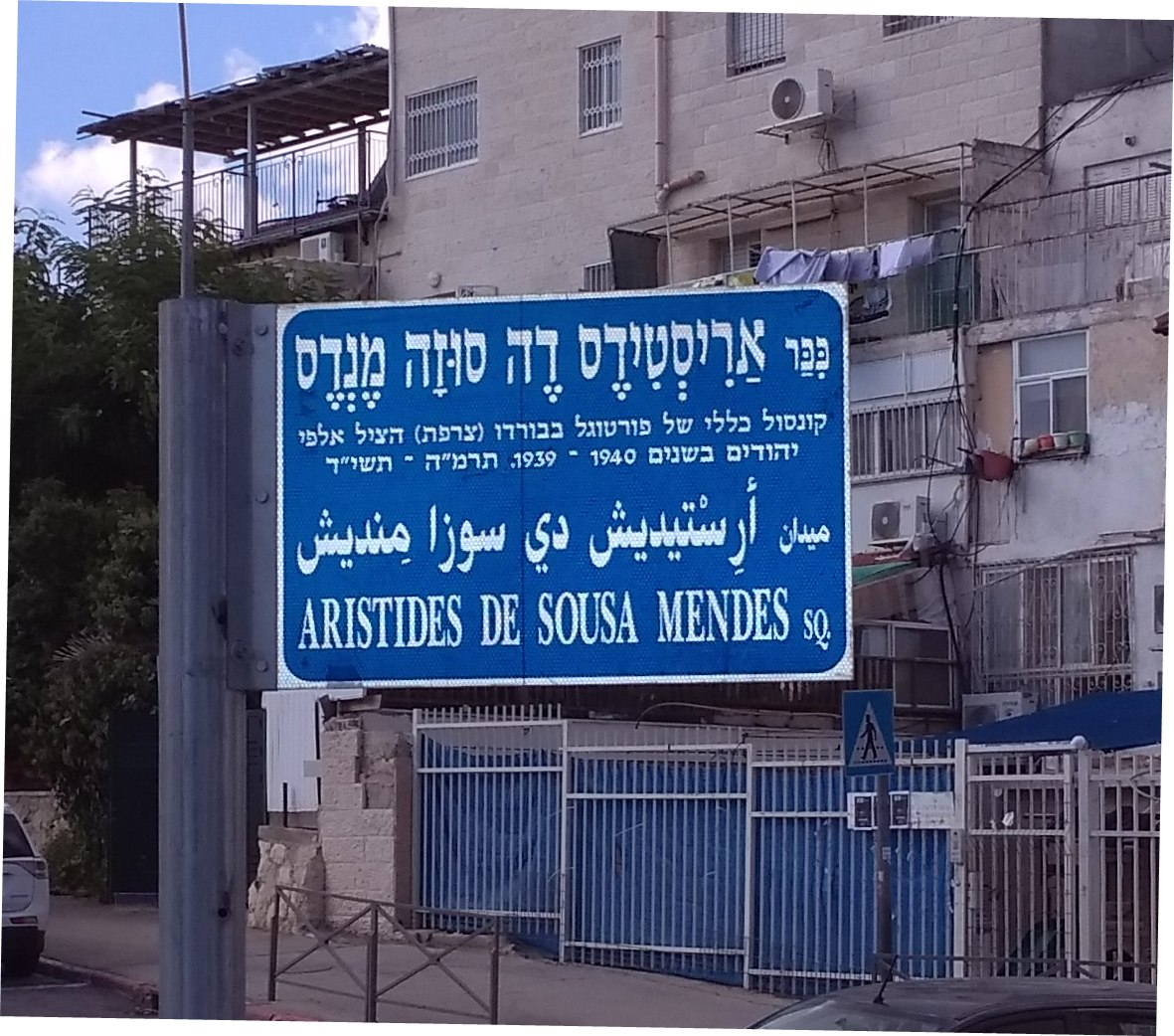
Memorial plaque in the square on Zangvil Street in Jerusalem named after Aristides de Sousa Mendes.

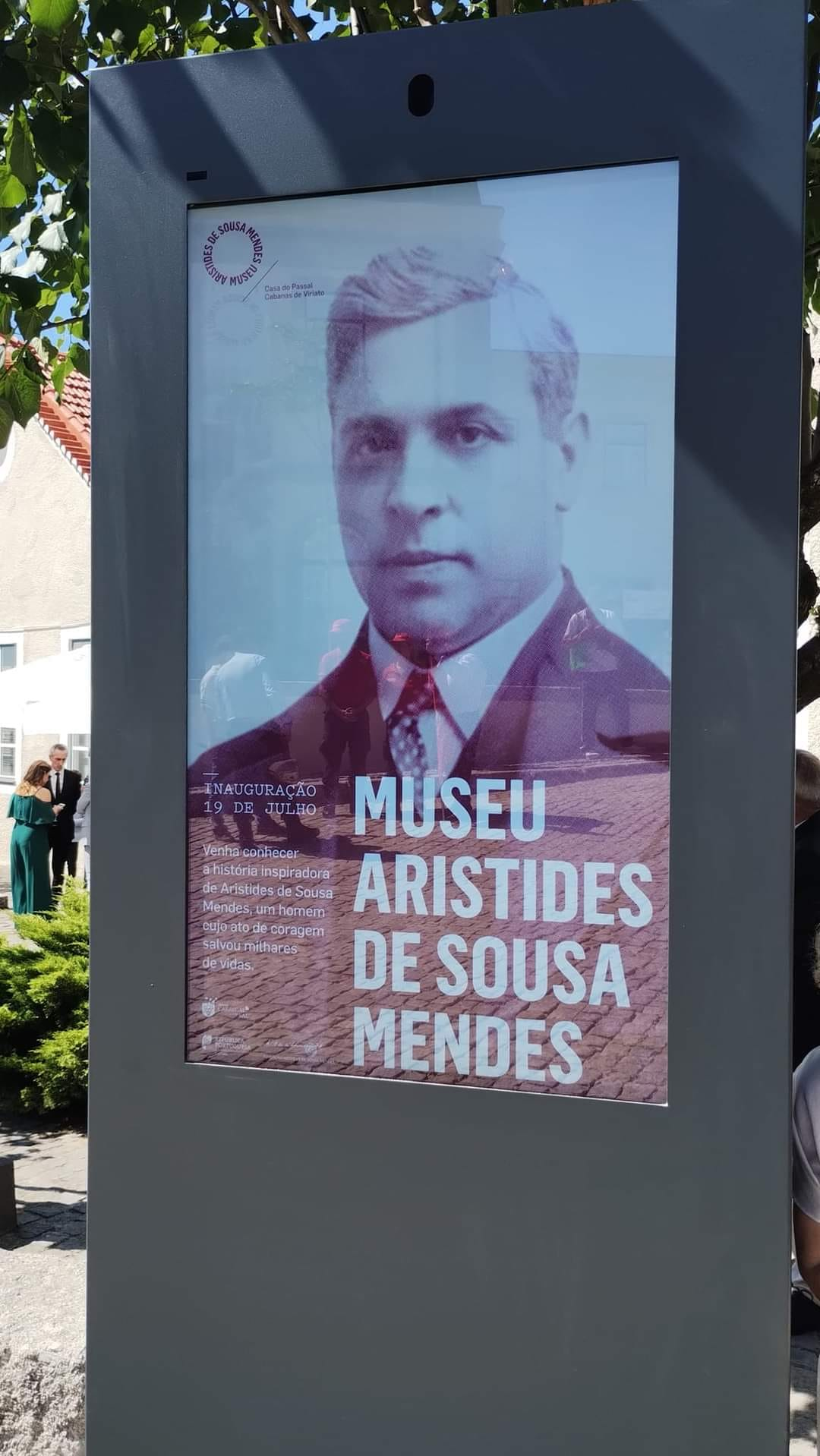
Sign in front of the Aristides de Sousa Mendes Museum in Cabanas de Viriato, Portugal.

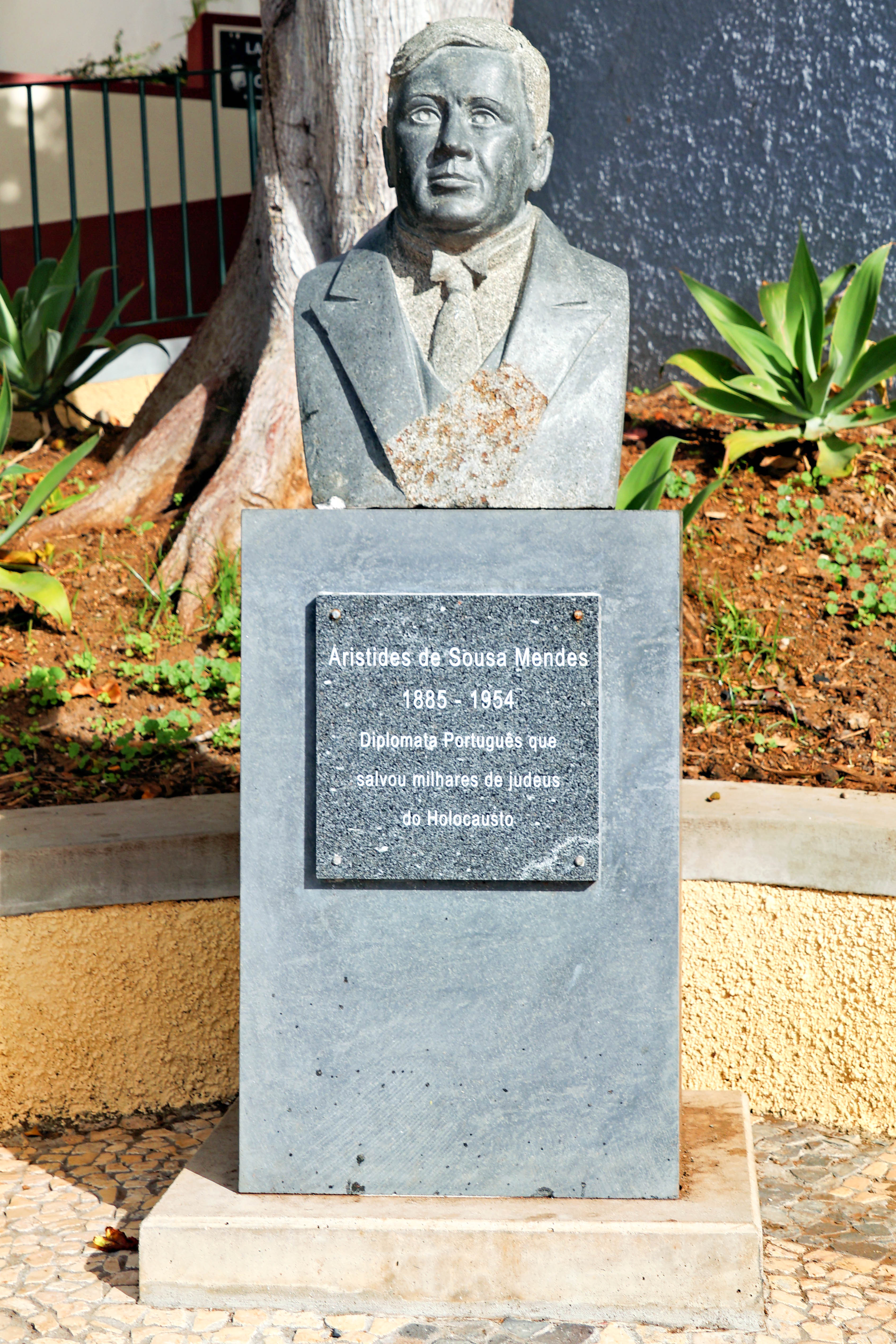
Bust of Aristides de Sousa Mendes in Funchal, Madeira inaugurated on April 3, 2025, reading: Portuguese diplomat who saved thousands of Jews from the Holocaust.

Sousa Mendes never regretted his action. "I could not have acted otherwise, and I therefore accept all that has befallen me with love," he reportedly said. To his lawyer he wrote: "In truth, I disobeyed, but my disobedience does not dishonor me. I did not respect orders that to me represented the persecution of true castaways who sought with all their strength to be saved from Hitler's wrath. Above the order, for me, there was God's law, and that's the one I have always sought to adhere to without hesitation. The true value of the Christian religion is to love one's neighbor."

He asked his children to help clear the family name and make the story known. In 1951, one of his sons, Sebastião, published a novella about the Bordeaux events, Flight Through Hell. After Sousa Mendes' death in 1954, his children worked tirelessly to clear his name and make the story known.

In the early 1960s, a few articles began appearing in the U.S. press.

In 1961, David Ben-Gurion, the Prime Minister of Israel, ordered that twenty trees be planted by the Jewish National Fund in memory of Sousa Mendes and in recognition of his deed.

In 1966, Yad Vashem recognized Sousa Mendes as a Righteous Among the Nations, among the earliest to be so named. However, with Salazar still in power, "the diplomat and his efforts remained unknown even in his own country for years." Moreover, Salazar's representatives gave statements to the press casting doubt on Sousa Mendes' heroism by denying that Circular 14 had ever existed.

=== Efforts to rehabilitate Sousa Mendes in Portugal ===
Following the 1974 Carnation Revolution in Portugal, when the Estado Novo dictatorship was overthrown and democracy was established, Dr. Nuno A. A. de Bessa Lopes, a Portuguese government official, took the initiative of reopening the Sousa Mendes case and making recommendations. His assessment, based on his viewing of previously sealed government files, was that the Salazar government had knowingly sacrificed Sousa Mendes for its own political ends, and that the verdict and punishment were illegal and should be overturned. "Aristides de Sousa Mendes was condemned for having refused to be an accomplice to Nazi war crimes," the report concluded. The report was suppressed by the Portuguese government for over a decade. "The failure to act on the Lopes report reflects the fact that there was never a serious purge of Fascist supporters from government ministries," explained journalist Reese Erlich.

In 1986, inspired by the election of Mário Soares, Sousa Mendes' son John Paul in the US, began a campaign to pressure the Portuguese government to recognized Sousa Mendes' action. "I want people in Portugal to know who he was, what he did, and why he did it," explained John Paul. He and his wife Joan worked with Robert Jacobvitz, an executive at the Jewish Federation of the Greater East Bay in Oakland, California, and lawyer Anne Treseder to create the "International Committee to Commemorate Dr. Aristides de Sousa Mendes." They were able to gain the support of two members of the California delegation of the United States House of Representatives, Tony Coelho and Henry Waxman, who introduced a resolution in Congress to recognize his humanitarian actions. That same year, Sousa Mendes was honored at the Simon Wiesenthal Center in Los Angeles, where John Paul and his brother Sebastião gave impassioned speeches and Waxman spoke as well.

In 1987, the Portuguese Republic began to rehabilitate Sousa Mendes' memory and granted him a posthumous Order of Liberty medal, one of that country's highest honors, although the consul's diplomatic honors still were not restored.

On 18 March 1988, the Portuguese parliament officially dismissed all charges, restoring Sousa Mendes to the diplomatic corps by unanimous vote, and honoring him with a standing ovation. He was promoted to the rank of Ministro Plenipotenciário de 2ª classe and awarded the Cross of Merit.

In December 1988, the U.S. Ambassador to Portugal, Edward Rowell, presented copies of the congressional resolution from the previous year to Pedro Nuno de Sousa Mendes, a son who had helped his father in the "visa assembly line" at Bordeaux, and to Portuguese President Mário Soares at the Palácio de Belém.

In 1994, former President Mário Soares dedicated a bust of Sousa Mendes in a Bordeaux park on Esplanade Charles de Gaulle, along with a commemorative plaque at 14 quai Louis‑XVIII, the address at which the consulate at Bordeaux had been located.

In 1995, Portugal held a week-long National Homage to Aristides de Sousa Mendes, culminating with an event in a 2000-seat Lisbon theater that was filled to capacity. A commemorative stamp was issued to mark the occasion. The Portuguese President Mário Soares declared Sousa Mendes to be "Portugal's greatest hero of the twentieth century."

=== Other recognitions ===
In October 1988 the Comité national français en hommage à Aristides de Sousa Mendes was established in Bordeaux, France, presided over for the next twenty-five years by Manuel Dias Vaz.

On 23 March 1995, the Pro-Dignitate Foundation, chaired by Dr. Maria de Jesus Barroso, promoted a national tribute to Aristides de Sousa Mendes with the presence of the President of the Republic, Mário Soares. During this ceremony, Aristides de Sousa Mendes was posthumously awarded the Grand Cross of the Order of Christ.

On 10 June 1996, Parc De Sousa-Mendes, a playground in Montreal, Canada, was dedicated in his honor.

In 1997, an international homage to Aristides de Sousa Mendes was organized by the European Union in Strasbourg, France.

In April 2004, to mark the 50th anniversary of Sousa Mendes' death, the International Raoul Wallenberg Foundation and the Angelo Roncalli Committee organized more than 80 commemorations around the world. Religious, cultural and educational activities took place in 30 countries on five continents, spearheaded by João Crisóstomo.

On 11 May 2005, a commemoration in memory of Aristides de Sousa Mendes was held at the UNESCO headquarters in Paris.

In 2007, Sousa Mendes was voted 3rd place in the poll show Os Grandes Portugueses (the greatest Portuguese) behind communist leader Álvaro Cunhal (runner-up) and the dictator António de Oliveira Salazar (winner).

In February 2008, Portuguese parliamentary speaker Jaime Gama led a session which launched a virtual museum, on the Internet, offering access to photographs and other documents chronicling Sousa Mendes' life.

On 24 September 2010, the Sousa Mendes Foundation was formed in the United States with the purpose of raising money for the conversion of the Sousa Mendes home into a museum and site of conscience, and in order to spread his story throughout North America.

In January 2013, the United Nations headquarters in New York honored Sousa Mendes and featured Sousa Mendes visa recipient Leon Moed as a keynote speaker during its International Days of Commemoration of Victims and Martyrs of the Holocaust. On 20 October of that year, a playground in Toronto, Canada was renamed in honor of Sousa Mendes. That same month, the Portuguese airline Windavia named an airplane after him. In December 2013, a letter that Sousa Mendes had penned to Pope Pius XII in 1946, begging for help from the Catholic Church, was delivered to Pope Francis.

In late May 2014, construction began at the Casa do Passal with funds from the European Union. In September of that year, TAP Air Portugal has named its newest Airbus A319 after Aristides de Sousa Mendes, as a tribute to the Portuguese Consul.

In 2016 Neely Bruce, composed an oratorio entitled "Circular 14: The Apotheosis of Aristides" detailing the life of Sousa Mendes. The first performance was held on 24 January 2016 in Los Angeles.

In 2017, the "Register Books of visas granted by Portuguese Consul in Bordeaux, Aristides Sousa Mendes (1939-1940)" were inscribed on UNESCO's Memory of the World International Register as documentary heritage of global significance.

In June 2020, Aristides de Sousa Mendes received a square on Zangvil Street in Jerusalem. Because of the COVID pandemic, the inaugural ceremony was delayed until November of 2022.

Also in 2022, in recognition of his effort in rescuing Polish citizens, he was honored by the President of Poland Andrzej Duda with the Virtus et Fraternitas Medal. That same year, a three story mural entitled The Angel of Bordeaux, commemorating Sousa Mendes was painted by artist Matthew Cadoch in Montreal, Canada

In 2025, in recognition of his efforts in rescuing thousands of Jews from the Holocaust, he was honored with a bust in Madeira.

== Casa do Passal, Aristides de Sousa Mendes Museum ==
Casa do Passal, in Cabanas de Viriato, the mansion that Sousa Mendes had to abandon and sell in his final years, was left for decades to decay into a "ghost of a building." In 1999, an agreement was reached between the Portuguese Ministry of Foreign Affairs and the descendants of Aristides de Sousa Mendes following the rehabilitation law that had been passed unanimously by the Portuguese Parliament on April 6, 1988. As a result, the Sousa Mendes family created the Fundação Aristides de Sousa Mendes (FASM). In parallel, the Portuguese Ministry of Foreign Affairs acquired the abandoned home that was then transferred to this foundation in order to eventually create a museum within its walls. On 3 March 2011, the Casa do Passal was designated a National Monument of Portugal.

On 20 June 2013, a big rally was held in front of Casa do Passal, to make a plea for its restoration. An American architect and Sousa Mendes visa recipient descendant, Eric Moed, spearheaded the event, attended by visa recipient families from all over the world, including his grandfather Leon Moed. At this event, a representative of the Portuguese Ministry of Culture publicly pledged $400,000 in European Union funds for the restoration effort.

On 19 July 2024, Sousa Mendes' birthday, the museum opened its doors. It was inaugurated by President Marcelo Rebelo de Sousa of Portugal and Mayor Paulo Catalino of Carregal do Sal. The museum showcases the vast archive of the Sousa Mendes family and tells the inspiring story of this man and the families he saved. Its objective is to highlight how a single human being changed the lives of thousands.

== Notable people issued visas by Sousa Mendes ==
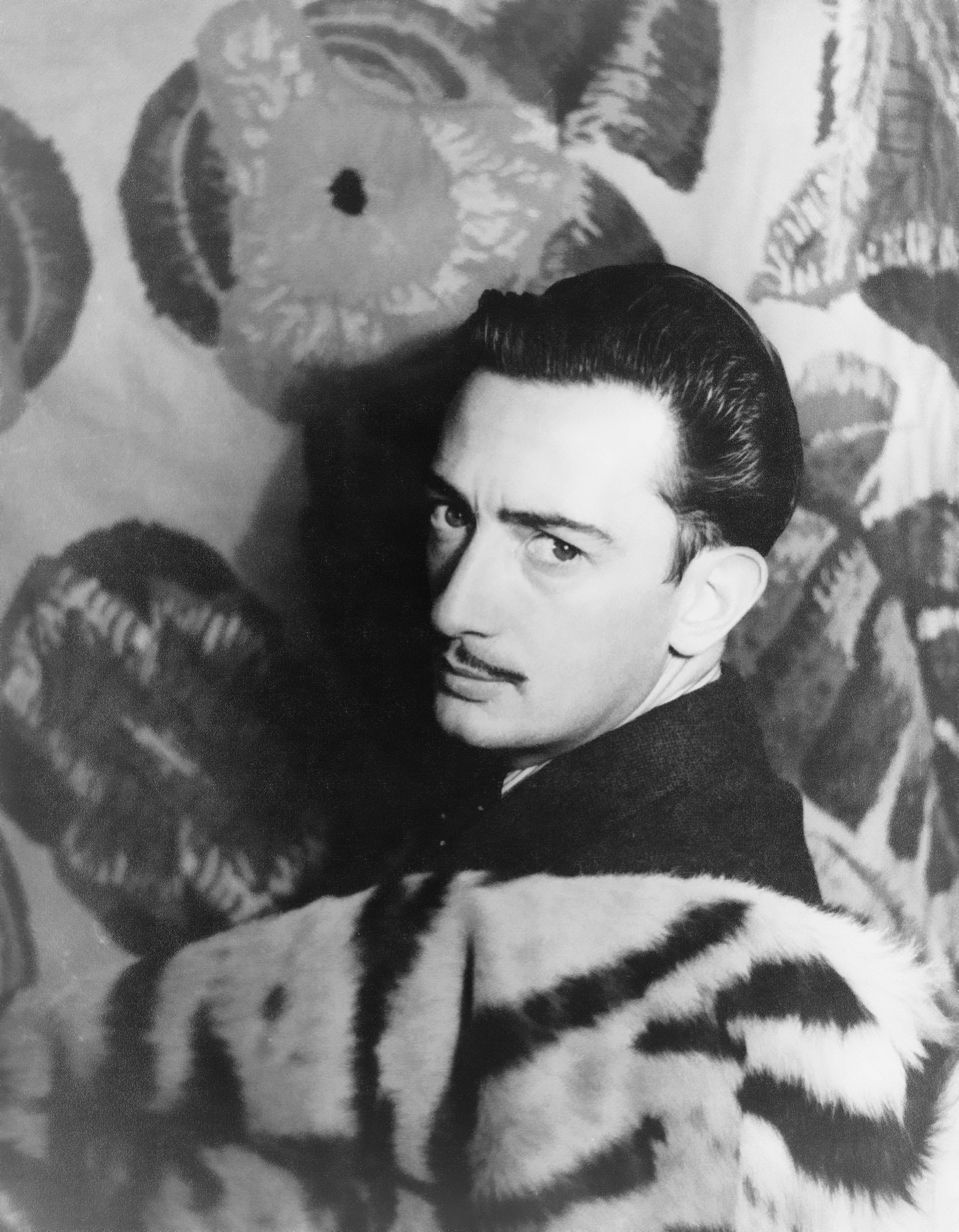
Salvador Dalí.

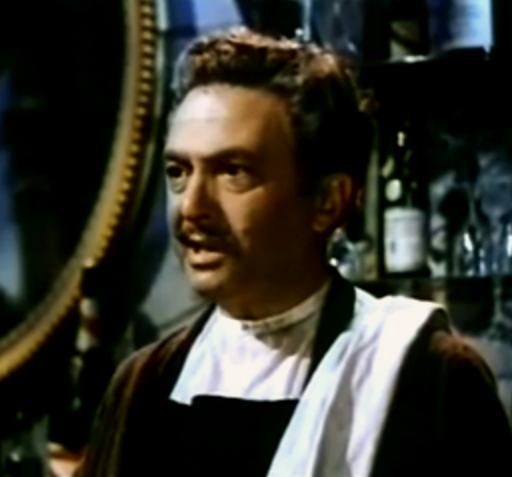
Marcel Dalio in The Snows of Kilimanjaro, 1952.

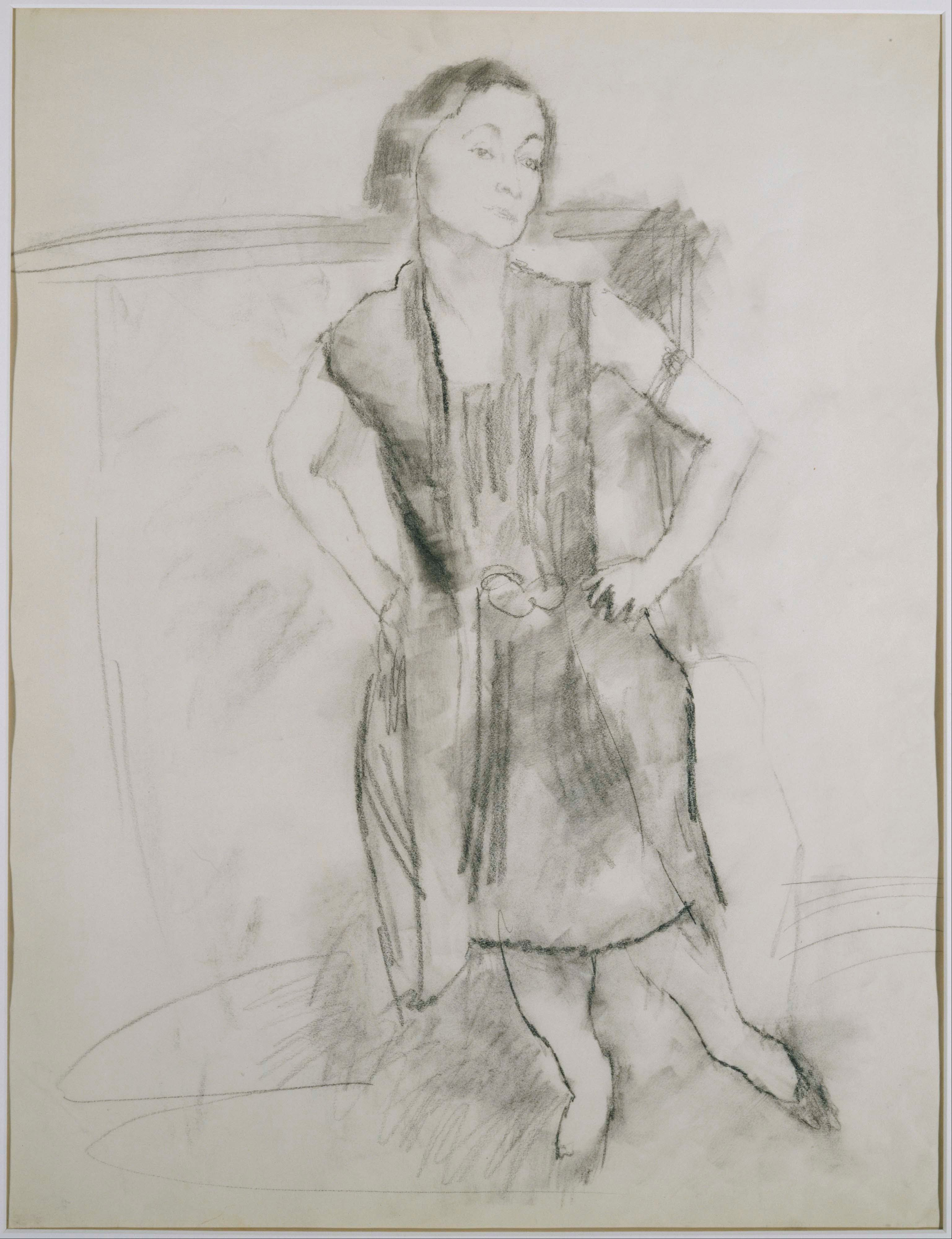
Maria Lani by Jules Pascin, charcoal on paper, The Phillips Collection, Washington, D.C.

Academics

- Stanley Deser, Ancell Professor of Physics, emeritus, Brandeis University, Caltech.
- Lissy Feingold Jarvik, professor emeritus of psychiatry, UCLA.
- Daniel C. Mattis, professor emeritus of physics, University of Utah
- Ludwik Witold Rajchman, physician and bacteriologist, founder of UNICEF
- Elizabeth Fondal Neufeld, geneticist, member of National Academy of Sciences, American Academy of Arts and Sciences and winner of Wolf Prize, the Albert Lasker Award for Clinical Medical Research, and National Medal of Science.
- Sylvain Bromberger, philosopher, professor at the Massachusetts Institute of Technology.

Creative artists

- Hélène de Beauvoir, painter, sister of Simone de Beauvoir.
- Salvador Dalí, the painter, whose Russian wife Gala was directly threatened by Circular 14.
- Marcel Dalio, actor in Casablanca.
- Grzegorz Fitelberg, conductor and violinist
- Jean-Michel Frank, interior designer and cousin of Anne Frank's father Otto Frank
- Hugo Haas, actor
- Maria Lani, actress and artist's model for Matisse, Chagall and others.
- Madeleine Lebeau, actress in Casablanca.
- Witold Małcużyński, pianist
- Hendrik Marsman, poet
- Robert Montgomery, actor
- H. A. Rey and Margret Rey, authors/illustrators of Curious George
- Claire Rommer, actress
- Paul Rosenberg, art dealer, and family
- Tereska Torrès, novelist
- Julian Tuwim, poet
- Jean-Claude van Itallie, actor and playwright

Journalists

- Hamilton Fish Armstrong
- Eugene Szekeres Bagger
- Marian Dąbrowski
- Boris Smolar
- Sonia Tomara

Political figures

- Joseph Bech, Foreign Minister of Luxembourg.
- Charlotte, Grand Duchess of Luxembourg.
- Pierre Dupong, Prime Minister of Luxembourg.
- Otto von Habsburg, nemesis of Hitler and heir to the Austrian throne.
- Maurice de Rothschild, art collector, vintner, financier, Senator of France.
- Henry Torrès, French lawyer and key supporter of Charles de Gaulle.
- Albert de Vleeschauwer, a leading member of the Belgian government in exile.

== See also ==
- Individuals and groups assisting Jews during the Holocaust
- Righteous Among the Nations
- Carlos Sampaio Garrido – Portuguese diplomat in Budapest during World War II
- Augusto Isaac de Esaguy
- Ładoś Group – Polish diplomats and Jewish activists who elaborated in Switzerland a system of illegal production of Latin American passports aimed at saving European Jews from the Holocaust
- Raoul Wallenberg – Swedish diplomat issuing protective passports and sheltered Jews

== Filmography ==
- ... With God Against Man ..., documentary by Semyon Pinkhasov (U.S., 2014).
- I am Alive Thanks to Aristides de Sousa Mendes, short documentary by Priscilla Fontoura (Portugal, 2013).
- Os Nove Dias de Sousa Mendes, documentary by Inês Faro (Canada, 2012).
- The Consul of Bordeaux, fictionalized historical drama by Francisco Manso and João Correa, with Vítor Norte and Antonio Capelo (Portugal, 2011).
- Disobedience: The Sousa Mendes Story, docudrama by Joël Santoni with Bernard Le Coq and Nanou Garcia (France, 2009).
- Diplomats for the Damned, documentary, The History Channel (U.S., 2000).
- Le consul proscrit, documentary by Diana Andringa and Teresa Olga (Portugal, 1994).

== Music ==
- Circular 14: The Apotheosis of Aristides, a dramatic oratorio in twenty tableaux about the life of Aristides de Sousa Mendes, composed by Neely Bruce.
