= József Finta =

Hungarian architect (1935–2024)

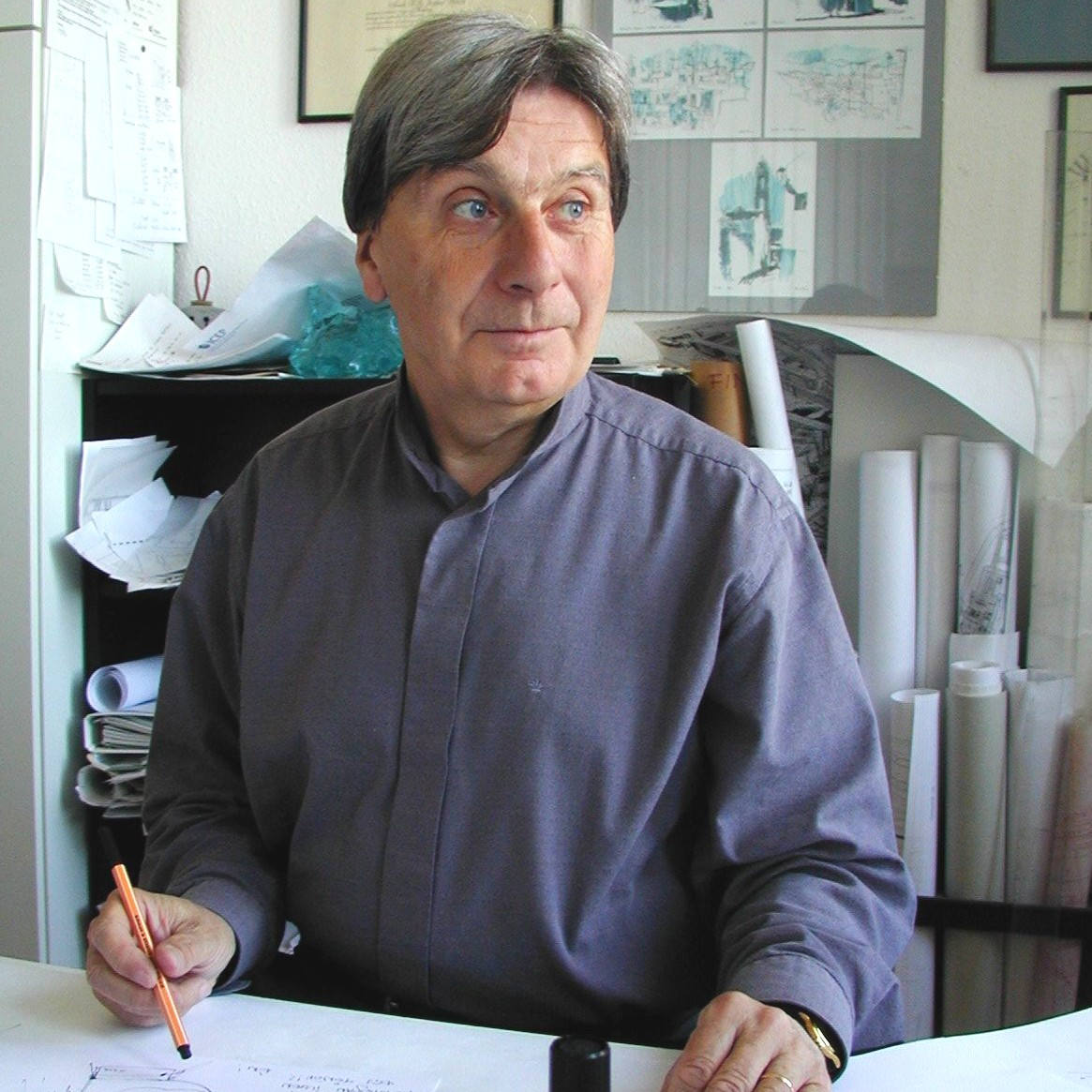

József Finta (12 June 1935 – 7 January 2024) was a Hungarian architect who designed the InterContinental Budapest. He was the winner of the Kossuth Prize, the Miklós Ybl Prize, the Imre Steindl Prize, and the Prima Primissima Award. Finta was born in Cluj on 12 June 1935, and died on 7 January 2024, at the age of 88.
