= Eugene Szekeres Bagger =

Hungarian-born, American critic and writer

Eugene Szekeres Bagger (born 1892) was a Hungarian-born, American critic and writer. He wrote articles on international politics and current affairs for publications such as the New York Times, Century, and the New Republic.

In 1921, the New Republic announced that Bagger was editing a Hungarian-language magazine, New Age, which declared itself "uncompromisingly opposed to any idea of americanization [sic] involving kneading the immigrant into static moulds." Author of multiple biographies, his Eminent Europeans: Studies in Continental Reality was widely reviewed when it was released in 1922. In 1941 he published the autobiography For the Heathen are Wrong: An Impersonal Autobiography.

== Life ==
Eugene Bagger was born in Budapest of a free-thinking Jewish father in the year 1892. From an early age, he developed an interest in Catholicism, and was received into the Catholic Church in his late teenage years. When World War I broke out, he travelled to England, hoping to serve in the British forces. That, however, did not prove possible. He then travelled to the United States, where he later acquired citizenship. He followed for a time a journalist's career in America writing for The Nation, The New Republic, The Century Magazine and The Atlantic Monthly. Bagger eventually returned to Europe, in 1924, with a commission to write the life of the late Emperor Franz Joseph I of Austria. He lived in various countries of Europe, but mainly in Provence, France. With the coming of World War II, he moved first with his family to the west of France, and then with France's collapse in 1940, escaping across the Spanish border, through Portugal, he eventually got back to the United States. Later in his life he returned to Portugal and lived there between 1948 and 1949, having published several works defending the Salazar’s Corporatist New State.

== Works ==
- Eminent Europeans: Studies in continental reality. New York: G.P. Putnam's Sons. 1922.
- Psycho-Graphology: A Study Of Rafael Schermann. G.P. Putnam's Sons. 1924.
- Francis Joseph: Emperor of Austria--king of Hungary. New York: G.P. Putnam's Sons. 1927.
- For the Heathen are Wrong: An impersonal autobiography. Boston: Little, Brown and Co; 1st edition. 1941.
- Portugal: Anti-Totalitarian Outpost. Lisbon: Edicoes S.N. I. 1947. also Published in "The Catholic World", Volumen 164, Paulist Press, 1947

== Articles ==
- "The Hungarian "Chaos"". The New Republic. November 2, 1918. pp. 9–10.
- "Poland and the Jewish Problem". The Nation. January 25, 1919. pp. 135–136.
- "The Playboy of the Southern World". The New Republic. December 3, 1924.
- "Uprooted Americans". Harper's Magazine. September 1929.
- "Expatriates in time". Harper’s Magazine. August 1933.
- "Flight from France, June 17–25". Harper's Magazine. November 1940.
- "Garden by the Sea" in Commonweal - A Review of Public Affairs, Literature, and the Arts, December 13, 1946, pp. 223–225
- "Impressions of Portugal". The Tablet. July 31, 1954.
