= Chapel of Nossa Senhora do Castelo (Mangualde) =

Nossa Senhora do Castelo Chapel
- Nossa Senhora do Castelo Chapel
- 40.61188°N 7.74258°W
- Location: Mangualde, Mangualde
- Country: Portugal
- Denomination: Catholic

History
- Founded: 14th century

Architecture
- Heritage designation: TBD
- Designated: TBD

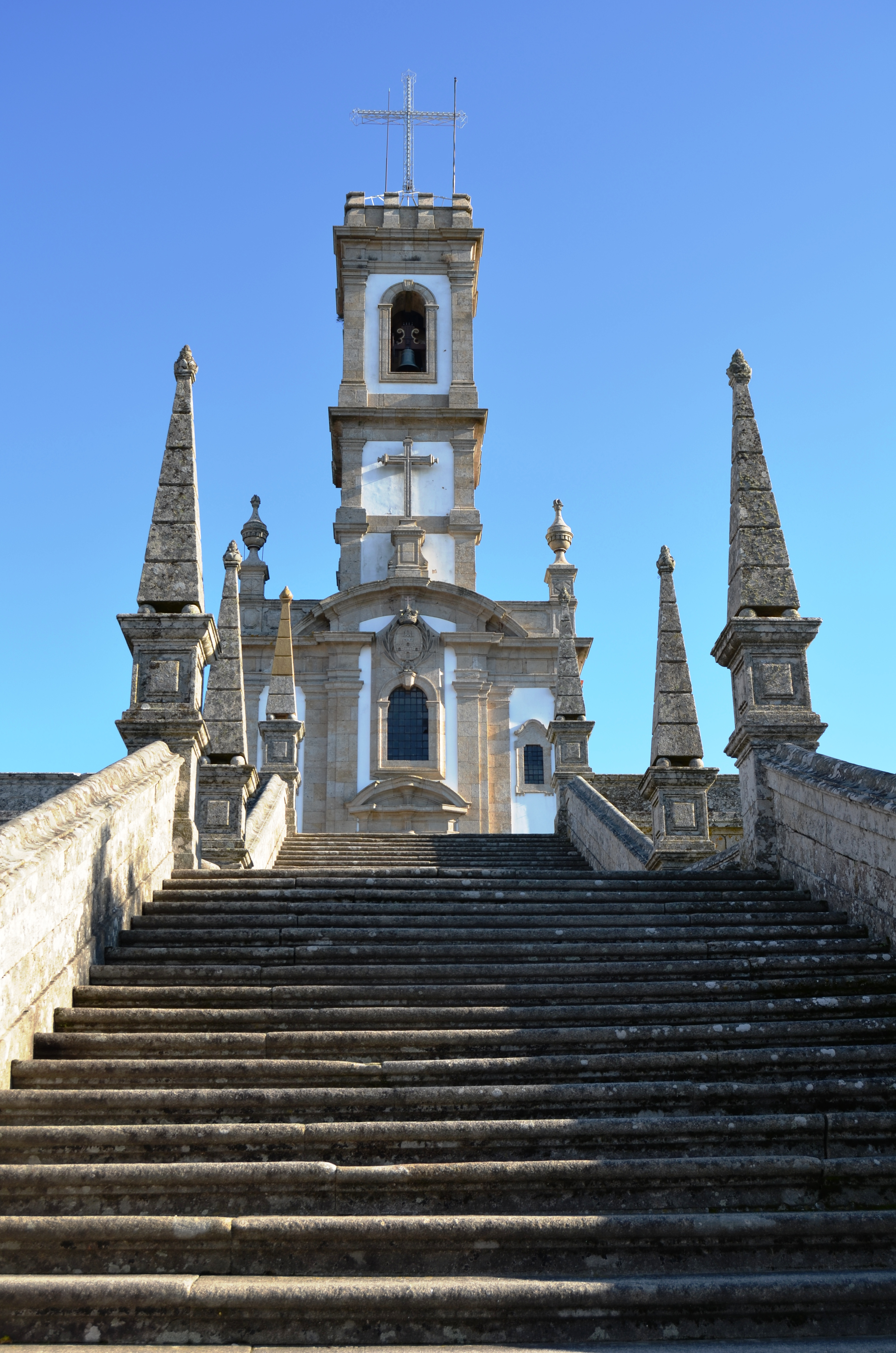

The Nossa Senhora do Castelo Chapel (Portuguese: Capela de Nossa Senhora do Castelo) is a chapel in Mangualde, Portugal. It is currently in the process of being a designated heritage site.
