= Manzi =

Manzi is a surname. Notable people with the surname include:

- Alberto Manzi (1924–1997), Italian school teacher, writer and television host
- Catello Manzi (born 1950), American harness racing driver and trainer
- Elios Manzi (born 1996), Italian judoka
- Emanuele Manzi (born 1977), Italian male mountain runner
- Franco Manzi (born 1966), Italian Catholic priest and academic
- Guglielmo Manzi (1784–1821), Italian classicist and librarian
- Homero Manzi (1907–1951), Argentine tango writer, author of various famous tangos
- Jim Manzi (born 1951), former chairman, president and CEO of Lotus Development Corporation
- Jim Manzi (software entrepreneur) (born 1963), National Review contributing editor and software company chairman
- Juli Manzi (born 1976), Brazilian musician and biographer
- Leonardo Manzi (born 1969), Brazilian football coach and a former player
- Pamela Manzi, Italian chemist
- Pedro Manzi (born 1988), Uruguayan-born Spanish professional footballer
- Roberto Manzi (born 1959), Italian fencer
- Stefano Manzi (born 1999), Italian motorcycle racer
- Thierry Manzi (born 1996), Rwandan professional footballer
- Warren Manzi (1955–2016), American playwright and actor

== See also ==
- Manzi (蠻子), a disparaging term for Southern China
- Mangi (disambiguation)
- Manji (disambiguation)
- Mansi (disambiguation)
- Andrew Manze (born 1965), United Kingdom baroque violinist
- Manzo
- Manz (surname)
- Menzies, a Scottish surname, originally the name of the Clan Menzies
- Manzini (disambiguation)
