= Mangy =

Mangy may mean:

- afflicted with mange, a skin disease
- afflicted with one of several other skin diseased colloquially known as mange
- scruffy, shabby, squalid, or decrepit

== See also ==
- Mangy Hill, in Alaska
- Magny (disambiguation)
- Mangi (disambiguation)
- Mangui
