= Mangi =

Mangi may refer to:

== People ==
- Adeel A. Mangi, American lawyer
- A kind of chiefship found among the Chaga tribe of Tanzania
- Mangi Mahal (fl. 1998–2019), Punjabi folk singer from India
- Mangi Meli (died in 1900), leader of the Chaga in the 1890s
- Mangi is a surname of Sindhi, which is inhabitant of Sindh.

== Places ==
- Mangi, Jalgaon district, Maharashtra, India
- Mangi, Solapur district, Maharashtra, India
- Mangi, Iran (disambiguation)
- Mangi or Manzi, a name for Southern China as distinct from Cathay during the Yuan dynasty

== See also ==
- Mangi Dam (disambiguation)
- Mangy (disambiguation)
- Mangi-Tungi, a twin-pinnacled peak near Tahrabad, Maharashtra, India
- Manji (disambiguation)
- Manzi (disambiguation)
