= Mangi Dam =

Mangi Dam may refer to:

- Mangi Dam, India, Maharashtra, India
- Mangi Dam, Pakistan, a dam near Ziarat in Balochistan, Pakistan

== See also ==
- Mangi (disambiguation)
- Manji (disambiguation)
