= Mangue =

Mangue, Mangué or Mangüé may refer to:

== People ==
- Mangué Camara (b. 1982), Guinean footballer
- Mangué Cissé (1945–2009), Ivorian footballer
- Constancia Mangue (b. 1951), First Lady of Equatorial Guinea
- Emiliana Mangue, Equatoguinean footballer
- Florencio Mayé Elá Mangue (b. 1942), Equatorial Guinean military leader
- Gerardo Angüe Mangue, Equatoguinean political activist
- Marta Mangué (b. 1983), Spanish handball player
- Ricardo Mangue Obama Nfubea (b. 1961), Equatoguinean politician
- Ruth Mangue (b. 1975), Equatoguinean sprinter.
- Teodoro Nguema Obiang Mangue (b. 1968), Vice President of Equatorial Guinea

== Places ==
- Giramangu, village in India also known as Mangue or Mangyu
  - Mangyu temple complex, located near Giramangu, India
- Mangue, Cape Verde
  - Estádio de Mangue, stadium in Mangue, Tarrafal, Cape Verde
- Mangue Grande, commune of Angola
- Porto do Mangue, municipality in Rio Grande do Norte, Brazil

== Other uses ==
- Crossarchus, genus of mongoose known as mangue
- Mangue people, ethnic group in Nicaragua
- Mangue language, an extinct Oto-Manguean language of Nicaragua, Honduras, and Costa Rica
- Manguean languages, a subgroup of the Oto-Manguean languages that includes the Mangue, Chorotega and Chiapanec languages
- Mangue bit, a Brazilian music style
- "Castillo mangüé", a Cuban street song
- "Mango mangüé", song by Francisco Fellove
