= Manj =

Manj may refer to:

== India ==
- Manjki Region, Punjab
- Manj (Ludhiana West), a village in Punjab

== Iran ==
- Manj District, a district (bakhsh) in Chaharmahal and Bakhtiari Province
- Manj Rural District, a rural district (dehestan) in Manj District
- Manj, Chaharmahal and Bakhtiari, a village in Manj Rural District

== See also ==
- Manj Musik, Indian singer-songwriter
- Mange (disambiguation)
- Manji (disambiguation)
- Manjhi (disambiguation)
- Monj (disambiguation)
