= Angueira =

- Civil parish
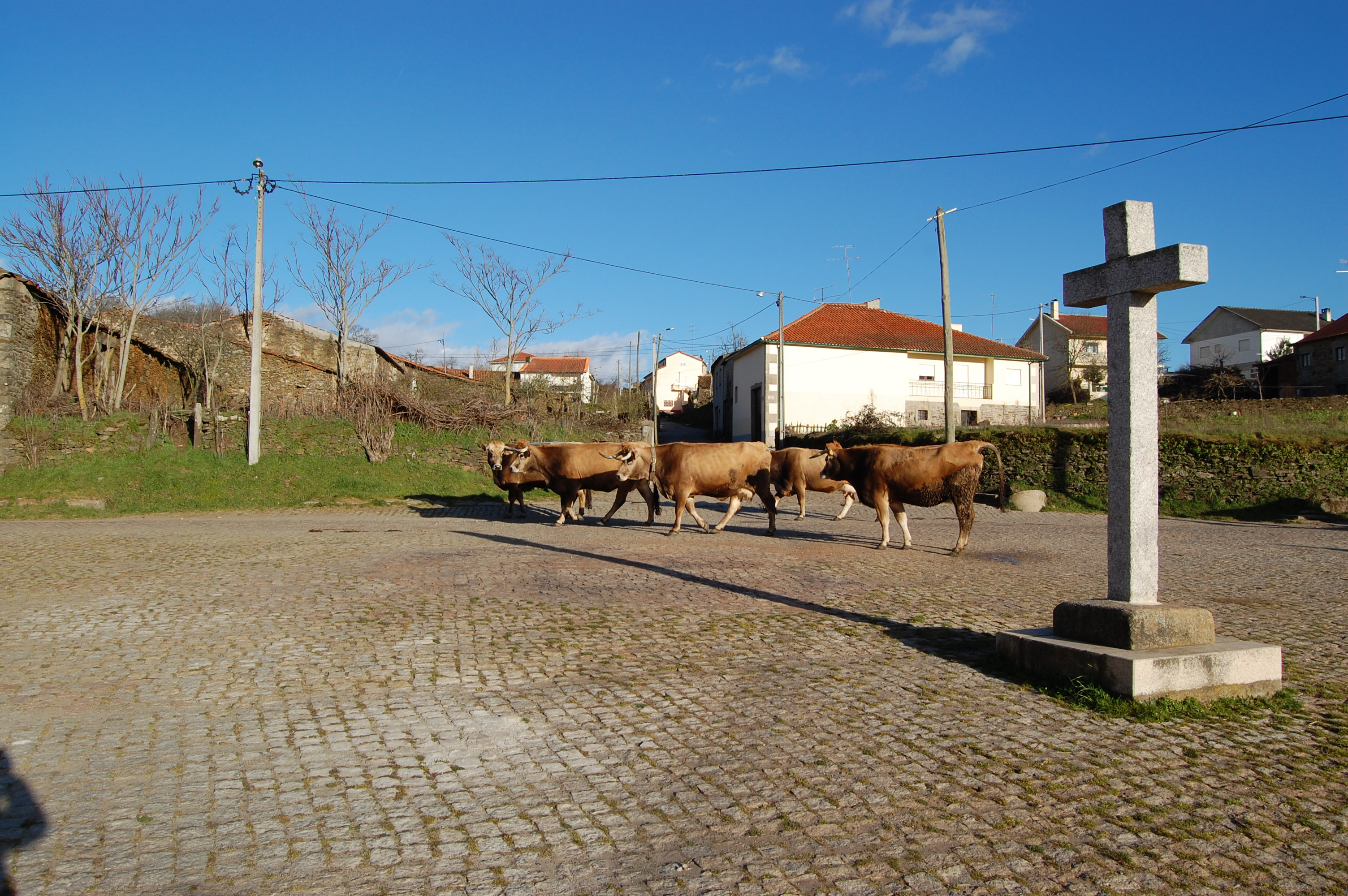
- The old square, with pelourinho or parish marker, as farmer transports cows to better grazing

- Location in Portugal
- Coordinates: 41°37′1″N 6°24′2″W
- Country: Portugal
- Region: Norte
- Intermunic. comm.: Terras de Trás-os-Montes
- District: Bragança
- Municipality: Vimioso
- Disbanded: 2013

Area
  - Total: 22.18 km^{2} (8.56 sq mi)
- Elevation: 697 m (2,287 ft)

Population (2011)
  - Total: 116
  - Density: 5.23/km^{2} (13.5/sq mi)
- Time zone: UTC+00:00 (WET)
  - Summer (DST): UTC+01:00 (WEST)
- Postal code: 5230-020
- Area code: 273
- Patron: São Cipriano

Angueira Portuguese pronunciation: [ɐ̃ˈɡɐj.ɾɐ] Mirandese pronunciation: [ãˈɡəj.ɾa] is a former civil parish in the municipality (concelho) of Vimioso, continental Portugal. In 2013, the parish merged into the new parish Caçarelhos e Angueira. The population in 2011 was 116, in an area of 22.18 km^{2}. It is situated near the north-west corner of the district of Bragança.

== History ==
Until 1853, Angueira was part of the extinct municipality of Outeiro.

This early history is marked by a community of several chapels, the one to São Miguel, as legend suggests, was founded by a former general, who turned hermit (and was later buried at the door of the temple).

== Geography ==
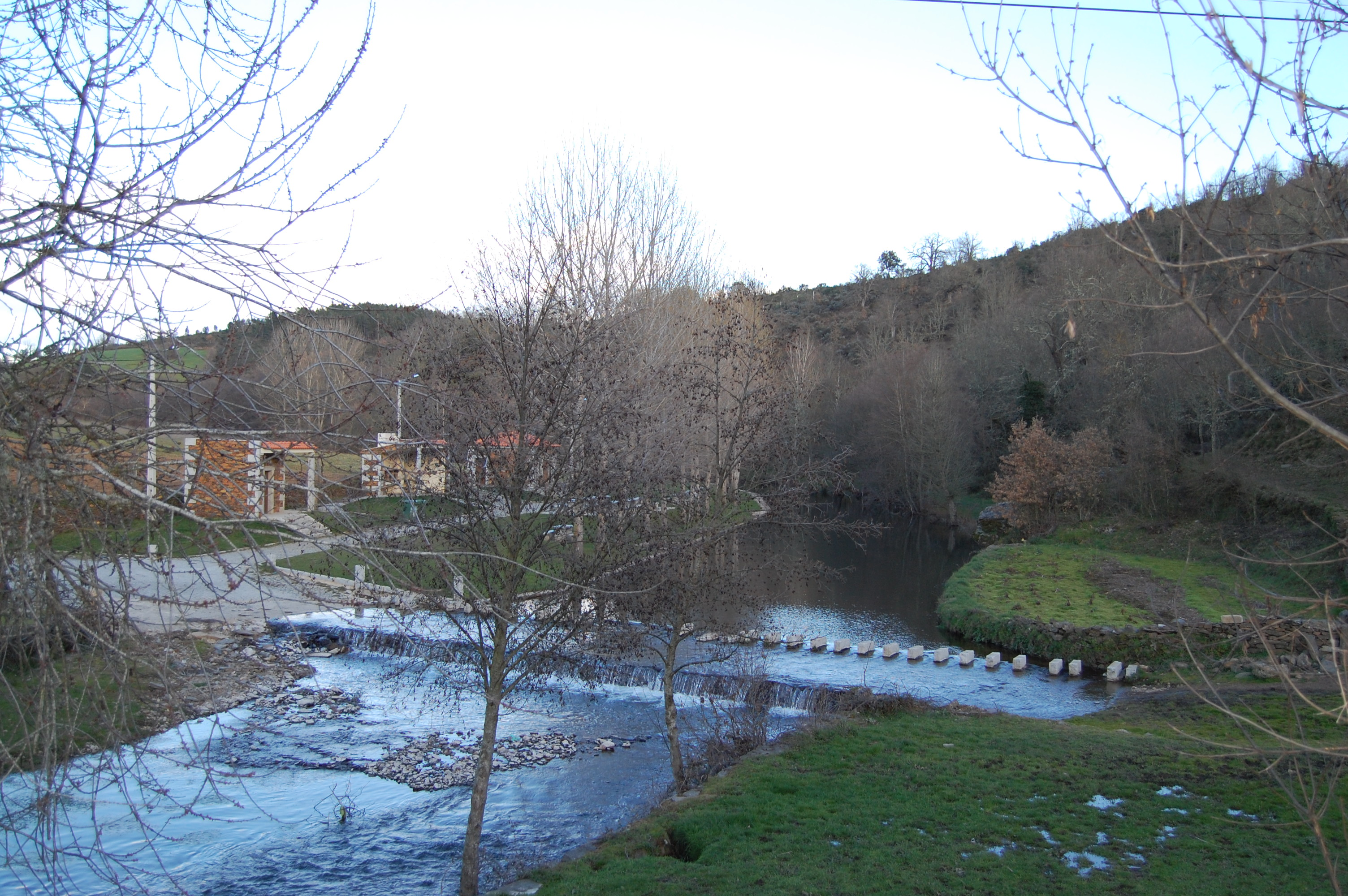
The river Angueira crossing the causeway between either margin

Angueira is located near the Portuguese frontier with Spain, in the northwest corner of the municipality of Vimioso, bordered in the north by the parishes of Avelanoso, west by Vale de Frades, south by Caçarelhos, and east by the municipality of Miranda do Douro. The parish is connected with its neighbours by main roads that intersect in the village, and link it to São Joanico, Caçarelhos, Avelanoso and Spain, by the asphalted Três Marras roadway. Crossed by the river of the same name, the main settlement of Angueira is located in the centre of this parish, occupying a small portion in pasturelands and forests, on the right margin of the Angueira River, in a shallow valley. The river is Angueira's ex-libris central attraction, a meandering course that bisects the parish, yet attracts locals and tourists throughout the year.

== Economy ==
A rural community, the residents are primarily involved in agricultural activities (supporting the raising of cattle, sheep and goats, owing to the rich pasturelands), although commercial businesses are located in the centre. Included in these activities is apiculture, fishing (mainly threadfin) and civil construction, in addition to hunting. The local Associação de Caçadores (English: Huntsmen Association) has promoted hunting in this region; known for its natural ecosystem that supports rabbit, partridge and quail, the Association, has in the past helped stock species for game hunting. At one time the waters of the Angueira River were popular destinations for fisherman hoping to catch abundant langoustine, principally from Spain.

== Architecture ==
=== Civic ===
- Fountain of Pio (Fonte do Pio)

=== Religious ===
- Chapel of Santo Cristo (Capela de Santo Cristo)
- Chapel of São Sebastião (Capela de São Sebastião)
- Chapel of São Miguel (Capela de São Miguel)
- Church of São Cipriano (Igreja Paroquial de Angueira/Igreja de São Cipriano)

In addition to the religious architecture, Angueira still preserves examples of the castro culture, which at one time supported the Moors, or pre-dates their period. In addition, springs, such as the Fonte Santa, known for local healing properties or "miracles" that may have occurred from the fresh waters. The local government has gone so far as to requalify the area around Fonta Santa, in order to attract further eco-friendly investments in the area. Related to these changes has also been the attempted preservation of local grist mills; yet, issues associated with local property rights have made attempts for full conservation complicated.

== Culture ==
Much like other villages in the Trás-os-Montas, Agueira is richly associated with festival, both religious and secular. Celebrations mark Christmas, the Epiphany, Carnival, Easter and traditional Dia do folar (first Monday of Easter), All Saints Day and summer festival.
