= Haplogroup T-L206 =

Human Y-chromosome DNA haplogroup

- Possible time of origin: 26,800 BP
- Possible place of origin: Western Asia
- Ancestor: T (T-M184)
- Descendants: T1a (T-M70)

Haplogroup T-L206, also known as haplogroup T1, is a human Y-chromosome DNA haplogroup. The SNP that defines the T1 clade is L206. The haplogroup is one of two primary branches of T (T-M184), the other subclade being T2 (T-PH110).

T1 is the most common descendant of the T-M184 haplogroup, being the lineage of more than 95% of all T-M184 members in Africa and Eurasia (as well as countries to which those populations have migrated in the modern era, in the Americas and Australasia). T1 lineages are now found at high frequencies among northern Somali clans. It is hypothesized that T1* (if not some of its subclades) originated in Western Asia, and spread into Europe and North Africa with the Pre-Pottery Neolithic B culture (PPNB).

The basal clade T1* is rare, but has been found in at least three males from widely separated regions: a Berber from Tunisia, a Syrian, and a Macedonian.

T-L206's sole primary branch, T1a (M70), is believed to have originated about 15,900 – 23,900 BP, in the Near East. It appears that a number of individuals bearing T-M70 later migrated south to Africa.

== Structure ==
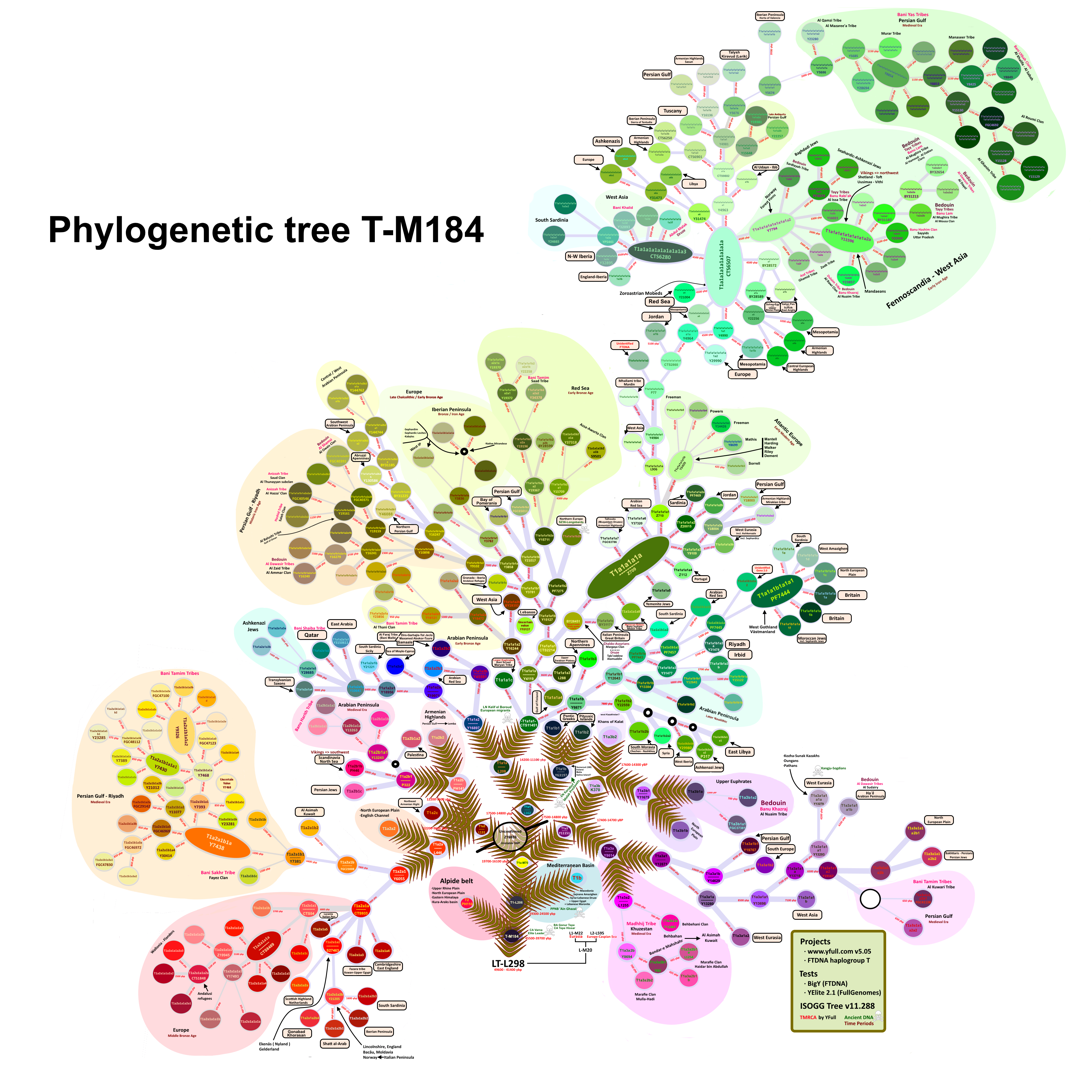
Phylogenetic T-M184 tree

- T1 (L206, L490) Found in Syria.
  - T1a (M70/Page46/PF5662, PAGES78) Found in Early Neolithic skeleton found in Karsdorf, Germany, 7200 years old. Also in Iran, Iraq, Saudi Arabia, Ossetia, England, Italy and Portugal.
    - T1a1 (L162/Page21, L299, L453/PF5617, L454) Found on Eivissa, northern Anatolia and Germany.
      - T1a1a (L208/Page2, L905) Mostly found in Upper Egypt, Horn of Africa, western Europe, eastern Anatolia, Iran and the Arabian Peninsula. Some spots in western Morocco, Sahrawis and Canarias.
        - T1a1a1 (P77,CTS8512) Mostly found in Middle East, Western Europe and Ashkenazi Jews.
        - T1a1a2 (P321) Found in Syria and Ashkenazi Jews.
          - T1a1a2a (P317) Found in Syria, Italian Jews and Ashkenazi Jews.
    - T1a2 (L131) Mostly found in northern Europe, eastern Europe, southeastern Europe and Anatolia. Also found in Xinjiang, Lemba, Tunisia, south and east Iberian Peninsula.
      - T1a2a (P322, P328) Found in Scandinavia, Denmark, Germany and Netherlands. Some spots in Yemenite Jews and Palestine(P327).
      - T1a2b (L446) Found in Northwest Europe and eastern Alps.
    - T1a3 (L1255) Found in Kuwait.

== Subclade distribution ==
=== T1* (T-L206*) ===
This lineage could have arrived in the Levant through the PPNB expansion from northeastern Anatolia.

Population	Language	Location	Members/Sample size	Percentage	Source	Notes
Berbers	Siwi (Berber)	Sejenane	1/47	2.1%		
Syrians	Unspecified	Syria	1/95	1.1%		
Macedonians	Macedonian (Balto-Slavic)	Macedonia	1/201	0.5%		Orthodox Christians of Macedonian ethnicity

=== T1a (M70) ===
Initial research on T1a-M70 (previously K2)

M70 is believed to have originated in Asia after the emergence of the K-M9 polymorphism (45–30 ky) (Underhill et al. 2001a). As deduced from the collective data (Underhill et al. 2000; Cruciani et al. 2002; Semino et al. 2002; present study), K2-M70 individuals, at some later point, proceeded south to Africa. While these chromosomes are seen in relatively high frequencies in Egypt, Oman, Tanzania, Ethiopia, they are especially prominent in the Fulbe 18%( [Scozzari et al. 1997, 1999])

— J. R. Luis et al. 2004,
Three genetically different populations in the Balearic Islands, Catalonia, Spain

The population of the Pityusic Islands does present a clear genetic divergence in relation to the Mallorcan and Menorcan populations. Neither [does it show] a confluence with the Catalan and Valencian populations ... [T]he data provided by the Pityusic population [compared] with other circumediterranean populations surprises [in] that practically there is no convergence with any of these populations, not even with ... North African populations. The Pityusic case is paradigmatic: ... some markers shows affinities with [Middle Eastern] ... mtDNA variables ... but [the Pityusic population] diverges from these populations when considering other markers. [It] is a separate case, a island, not [just] in the geographical sense but [also a] genetical [island].

— Misericòrdia Ramon Juanpere et al., 1998-2004

Population	Language	Location	Members/Sample size	Percentage	Source	Notes
Pityusic Islands	Eivissenc (Ibizan) (Romance)	Ibiza, Balearic Islands, Catalonia, Spain	9/54	16.7%		L454+. All individuals carry typical Ibizan surnames and had paternal grandfathers born in Ibiza.
Pityusic Islands	Eivissenc	Ibiza	7/96	7.3%		L454+
Pityusic Islands	Eivissenc	Ibiza	3/45	6.7%		L454+

=== T1a1 (L162; xL208) ===
T1a1 formed 17,400-14,600 BP, is the largest lineage downstream from T1a-M70 and became widespread across Eurasia and Africa before the modern era.

This extremely rare subclade has been found in Ibizan (Eivissan) islanders and Pontic Greeks from Giresun. The first Y-STR haplotype belonging to this lineage appeared in the paper of Tomas et al in 2006 among a sample of Eivissan individuals but is not until August 2009 when the first T1a1-L162(xL208) individual was reported in a 23andMe customer of Pontic Greek background and Metaxopoulos surname, thanks to the public Adriano Squecco's Y-Chromosome Genome Comparison Project.

Pontic Greeks from Giresun descend from Sinope colonists and Sinope was colonised by Ionians from Miletus. It is interesting to note that there existed an Ionian colony known as Pityussa, just like the known Greek name for Eivissa Pityuses. In Eivissa, archaeological findings include the famous bust of Demeter which has been confused with the Punic goddess Tanit for decades. The bust belonging to Demeter has been analysed and was found to contain black particles of volcanic sand, originating from Mount Etna. It is thought that the bust was made in Sicily, with red clays typical of the eastern Trinacria, which was colonized by the Ionians. The Ionians could be arrived to Eivissa c.2700 YBP. This lineage could be an Ionian marker. T1a1 formed 17,400-14,600 BP, is the largest lineage downstream from T1a-M70 and became widespread across Eurasia and Africa before the modern era.

=== T1a1a (L208) ===
This lineage, formed 14,200-11,000 BP, is the largest branch downstream T1a1-L162. First discovered and reported in August 2009 in a 23andMe customer of Iberian ancestry that participated in the public Squecco's Y-Chromosome Genome Comparison Project and appearing there as "Avilés" and as "AlpAstur" in 23andMe. Named as "L208" at November 2009.

=== T1a1a1a1b1a1 (Y3782; xY3836) ===
Population	Language	Location	Members/Sample size	Percentage	Source	Notes
Sardinians	Campidanese (Romance languages)	Casteddu	1/187	0.5%		

=== T1a1a1a1b1a1a (Y3836) ===
This lineage is mostly found among individuals from the Iberian Peninsula, where is found their highest diversity. The first Y-STR haplotype of this lineage, characterized by DYS437=13, was found in the public FTDNA Y-DNA Haplogroup T project, appearing there at April 2009 as kit E8011. However, is not until June 2014 when the Y-SNP Y3836 was discovered in the public YFULL project among two of their participants of Iberian ancestry, appearing there as YF01637 and YF01665.

Population	Language	Location	Members/Sample size	Percentage	Source	Notes
Panamanians	Panamian Castilian (Romance languages)	Los Santos Province	1/30	3.3%		
Colombians	Colombian Castilian (Romance languages)	Caldas	2/75	2.7%	YHRD	Mestizo individuals
Panamanians	Panamian Castilian (Romance languages)	Panama Province	1/43	2.3%		
Northwest Argentinians	Argentinian Castilian (Romance languages)	Mountainous region of Jujuy	1/50	2%	YHRD	Admixed population
Puerto Ricans	Puerto Rican Castilian (Romance languages)	Southeast Puerto Rico	2/110	1.8%		
Northeastern Portuguese Jews	Judaeo-Portuguese (Romance)	Bragança, Argozelo, Carção, Mogadouro, and Vilarinho dos Galegos	1/57	1.8%		
Native Mirandese speakers	Mirandese Astur-leonese (Romance)	Miranda de l Douro	1/58	1.7%		
Dominicans	Dominican Castilian (Romance languages)	Dominican Republic	4/261	1.5%		
Panamanians	Panamian Castilian (Romance languages)	Chiriquí Province	1/92	1.1%		
Mecklenburgers	East Low Saxon (West Germanic)	Rostock	2/200	1%		
Colombians	Colombian Castilian (Romance languages)	Bogotá	2/195	1%	YHRD	Mestizo individuals
Colombians	Colombian Castilian (Romance languages)	Valle del Cauca	1/103	1%	YHRD	Mestizo individuals
Venezuelans	Venezuelan Castilian (Romance languages)	Maracaibo	1/111	0.9%		
Venezuelans	Venezuelan Castilian (Romance languages)	Central Region	1/115	0.9%		
Europeans	Brazilian Portuguese (Romance languages)	São Paulo	1/120	0.8	YHRD	European descents
Ecuadorians	Ecuadorian Castilian (Romance languages)	Quito	1/120	0.8%		
Colombians	Colombian Castilian (Romance languages)	Antioquia	6/777	0.7%		
Mexicans	Mexican Castilian (Romance languages)	Tuxtla Gutiérrez	1/154	0.7	YHRD	Mestizo individuals
Mexicans	Mexican Castilian (Romance languages)	Mérida	1/159	0.6%	YHRD	Mestizo individuals
Eastern Andalusians	Andalusian (Romance)	Granada	1/180	0.6%		
Colombians	Colombian Castilian (Romance languages)	Santander	1/193	0.5%	YHRD	Mestizo individuals
Chileans	Chilean Castilian (Romance languages)	Concepción	1/198	0.5%	YHRD	
Mexicans	Mexican Spanish (Romance languages)	Guadalajara	1/246	0.4%	YHRD	Mestizo individuals
Europeans	Brazilian Portuguese (Romance languages)	Rio Grande do Sul	1/255	0.4%		

== Geographical distribution ==
=== Europe ===
Cretan Greeks from Lasithi possess Haplogroup T, almost certainly T1a (M70), at a level of 18% (9/50).

Unconfirmed but probable T-M70+ : 14% (3/23) of Russians in Yaroslavl, 12.5% (3/24) of Italians in Matera, 10.3% (3/29) of Italians in Avezzano, 10% (3/30) of Tyroleans in Nonstal, 10% (2/20) of Italians in Pescara, 8.7% (4/46) of Italians in Benevento, 7.8% (4/51) of Italians in South Latium, 7.4% (2/27) of Italians in Paola, 7.3% (11/150) of Italians in Central-South Italy, 7.1% (8/113) of Serbs in Serbia, 4.7% (2/42) of Aromanians in Romania, 3.7% (3/82) of Italians in Biella, 3.7% (1/27) of Andalusians in Córdoba, 3.3% (2/60) of Leoneses in León, 3.2% (1/31) of Italians in Postua, 3.2% (1/31) of Italians in Cavaglià, 3.1% (3/97) of Calabrians in Reggio Calabria, 2.8% (1/36) of Russians in Ryazan Oblast, 2.8% (2/72) of Italians in South Apulia, 2.7% (1/37) of Calabrians in Cosenza, 2.6% (3/114) of Serbs in Belgrade, 2.5% (1/40) of Russians in Pskov, 2.4% (1/42) of Russians in Kaluga, 2.2% (2/89) of Transylvanians in Miercurea Ciuc, 2.2% (2/92) of Italians in Trino Vercellese, 1.9% (2/104) of Italians in Brescia, 1.9% (2/104) of Romanians in Romania, 1.7% (4/237) of Serbs and Montenegrins in Serbia and Montenegro, 1.7% (1/59) of Italians in Marche, 1.7% (1/59) of Calabrians in Catanzaro, 1.6% (3/183) of Greeks in Northern Greece, 1.3% (2/150) of Swiss Germans in Zürich Area, 1.3% (1/79) of Italians in South Tuscany and North Latium, 1.1% (1/92) of Dutch in Leiden, 0.5% (1/185) of Serbs in Novi Sad (Vojvodina), 0.5% (1/186) of Polish in Podlasie

=== Middle East & Caucasus ===
Population	Language	Location	Members/Sample size	Percentage	Source	Notes
Iraqi Jews	Judeo-Iraqi Arabic (Central Semitic)	Iraq	7/32	21.9%		12.5% T1a1a1a1a1a1-P77 and 9.4% T1a3-Y11151
Armenian Sasuntzis	Western Armenian dialect, Kurmanji and Dimli (Northwestern Iranian) languages	Sasun	21/104	20.2%		T1a1 and T1a2 subclades
Kurdish Jews	Judeo-Aramaic (Central Semitic)	Kurdistan	9/50	18%		10% T1a1a1a1a1a1-P77 and 8% T1a1-L162
Iranian Jews	Judeo-Iranian (Southwestern Iranian)	Iran	3/22	13.6%		4.5% T1a1a1a1a1a1-P77 and 9.1% T1a3-Y11151
Mountain Jews	Judeo-Tat (Southwestern Iranian)	Derbentsky District	2/17	11.8%		All belong to T1a1a1a1a1a1-P77
Not specified	Not specified	Birjand	1/27	3.7%		All T1a3-Y12871
Not specified	Not specified	Mashhad	2/129	1.6%		0.8% T1a3-Y11151 (xY8614)

Unconfirmed but probable T-M70+ : 28% (7/25) of Lezginians in Dagestan, 21.7% (5/23) of Ossetians in Zamankul, 14% (7/50) of Iranians in Isfahan, 13% (3/23) of Ossetians in Zil'ga, 12.6% (11/87) of Kurmanji Kurds in Eastern Turkey, 11.8% (2/17) of Palestinian Arabs in Palestine, 8.3% (1/12) of Iranians in Shiraz, 8.3% (2/24) of Ossetians in Alagir, 8% (2/25) of Kurmanji Kurds in Georgia, 7.5% (6/80) of Iranians in Tehran, 7.4% (10/135) of Palestinian Arabs in Israeli Village, 7% (10/143) of Palestinian Arabs in Israel and Palestine, 5% (1/19) of Chechens in Chechenia, 4.2% (3/72) of Azerbaijanians in Azerbaijan, 4.1% (2/48) of Iranians in Isfahan, 4% (4/100) of Armenians in Armenia, 4% (1/24) of Bedouins in Israel and 2.6% (1/39) of Turks in Ankara.

=== North & East Asia ===
Barghut Mongolians from |different localities of Hulun Buir Aimak have T1a (M70) at a level of 1.3% (1/76). In the 12–13th centuries, the Barga (Barghuts) Mongols appeared as tribes near Lake Baikal, named Bargujin.

Unconfirmed but probable T-M70+: 2% (4/204) of Hui in Liaoning province, and 0.9% (1/113) of Bidayuh in Sarawak.

=== South Asia ===
Haplogroup T1a-M70 in South Asia is considered to be of West Eurasian origin.

In Bangladesh, the Garo people of Tangail District appear to possess T-P77 (T1a1a1b2b2b1a) at a rate of 0.8% (1/120).

In India, unconfirmed but probable T-M70+ : 56.6% (30/53) of Kunabhis in Uttar Kannada, 55.6% (10/18) Kurru in Andhra Pradesh. 52.6% (10/19) of Bauris of ||West Bengal, 50% (2/4) of Lodha in West Bengal, 32.5% (13/40) of Kammas in Andhra Pradesh, 26.8% (11/41) of Brahmins in Visakhapatnam, 25% (1/4) of Kattunaiken in South India, 22.4% (11/49) of Telugus in Andhra Pradesh, 20% (1/5) of Ansari in South Asia, 15.3% (2/13) of Maheli in West Bengal, 15% (3/20) of Chenchus of Andhra Pradesh (2/20) of Poroja in Andhra Pradesh, 9.8% (5/51) of Kashmiri Pandits in Jammu and Kashmir, 10.6% (4/38) of Gonds in Uttar Pradesh, 8.2% (4/49) of Gujjars in Jammu and Kashmir, 7.7% (1/13) of Siddis (migrants from Ethiopia) in Andhra Pradesh, 5.5% (3/55) of Adi in Northeast India, 5.5% (7/128) of Pardhans in Adilabad, 5.3% (2/38) of Brahmins in Bihar, 4.3% (1/23) of Bagata in Andhra Pradesh, 4.2% (1/24) of Valmiki in Andhra Pradesh, (1/32) of Brahmins in Maharashtra, 3.1% (2/64) of Brahmins in Gujarat, 2.9% (1/35) of Rajput in Uttar Pradesh, 2.3% (1/44) of Brahmins in Peruru, and 1.7% (1/59) of Manghi in Maharashtra. Also in Deshastha Brahmins in Maharashtra (1/19 or 5.3%) and Chitpavan Brahmins in Konkan (1/21 or 4.8%), Chitpavan-Brahmins in Konkan (2/66 or 3%).

In Pakistan, 1% (1/96) of the Pashtuns from Khyber Pakhtunkhwa, were found to be M170 positive.

=== Africa ===
Population	Language	Location	Members/Sample size	Percentage	Source	Notes
Somalis (Dir clan)	Somali (East Cushitic)	Djibouti	24/24	100%		The main sub-clans of the Dir clan in Djibouti are the Issa and Gadabuursi.
Somalis (Dire Dawa)	Somali (East Cushitic)	Dire Dawa	14/17	82.4%		Dir sub-clans of Dire Dawa are Issa, Gurgura and Gadabuursi.
Anteony	Antemoro (Plateau Malagasy)	old Antemoro Kingdom	22/37	59.5%		The Anteony are the descendants of aristocrats, from whom the Antemoro king is chosen. Can be grouped into the Silamo, because they have the right to undertake the ritual slaughter of animals (Sombily)
Somalis (Dir clan) and Afars	Somali and Afar (East Cushitic)	Djibouti	30/54	56.6%		Mixed sample of Somali and Afar individuals.
Somalis (Ethiopia)	Somali (East Cushitic)	Shilavo (woreda) (Ogaden)	5/10	50%		The geographic location of this Ethiopia sample as seen in Fig.1.
Somalis (Isaaq)	Somali (East Cushitic)	Somaliland	4/4	100%		All belonging to the T1a-Y16897 subclade
Toubou	Toubou	Chad		31%		All belonging to the T1a-PF5662 subclade
Lemba	Venda and Shona (Bantu)	Zimbabwe/South Africa	6/34	17.6%		Exclusively belong to T1a2* (old T1b*). Possible recent founder effect. Low frequency of T1a2 has been observed in Bulgarian Jews and Turks but is not found in other Jewish communities. Y-str Haplotypes close to some T1a2 Armenians.
Baribas	Baatonum (Niger–Congo)	Benin	1/57	1.8%		T1a-M70(xT1a2-L131)

== Ancient DNA ==
=== Linear Pottery (LBK) culture ===
A T1a sample was found in the Early Neolithic Linear Pottery (LBK) culture in Germany by Mathieson et al. (2015).

=== Ayn Ghazal, Jordan ===
Haplogroup T1a (T-M70) has been found among the Pre-Pottery Neolithic B inhabitants from Ayn Ghazal, and is currently the oldest known sample ever found at any ancient site. This second haplotype marker wasn't found among the early Levant epipaleolithic populations.

=== Peki'in Cave, Israel ===
During the Chalcolithic Period, (the "Copper Age") in the Northern Galilee town of Peki'in here's a burial cave that dates to over 6,500 years ago. The cave is the largest one known in Israel and contains a wealth of ancient artifacts: decorated ossuaries which some claim is the proto Israelite Burial, burial offerings, jars, stone tools. We find that the individuals buried in Peqi'in Cave represent a relatively genetically homogeneous population. This homogeneity is evident not only in the genome-wide analyses but also in the fact that most of the male individuals (nine out of ten) belong to the Y-DNA Haplogroup T a lineage thought to have diversified in the Near East. 2x T-L208 Peqi'in 1155,1160, 1x T-FT13419 Peqi'in 1165, 4x T-Y4119 Peqi'in ,1166,1170,1172,1178, 2x T-L454 Peqi'in 1180,1187 expressing the upstream and downstream diversity of Haplogroup T-M184 in West Asia its most likely point of divergence.

=== Kulubnarti Nubian Christian ===
Kulubnarti 6340 was a 18 month old baby boy who lived between 770 - 960 CE Kulubnarti 6328 was a 7 year old boy who lived between 700 - 990 CE during the North Africa Christian Age and was found in the region now known as the elite R cemetery in Kulubnarti, Sudan. They were associated with the Kulubnarti Nubians cultural group the Y-DNA was T-Y31479 and T-FT338883 they along with a Haplogroup LT were the three outliers amongst the Nubian elite R cemetery.

== Notable members ==
=== Elite endurance runners ===
Possible patterns between Y-chromosome and elite endurance runners were studied in an attempt to find a genetic explanation to the Ethiopian endurance running success. Given the superiority of East African athletes in international distance running over the past four decades, it has been speculated that they are genetically advantaged. Elite marathon runners from Ethiopia were analysed for K*(xP) which according to the previously published Ethiopian studies is attributable to the haplogroup T

According to further studies, T1a1a* (L208) was found to be proportionately more frequent in the elite marathon runners sample than in the control samples than any other haplogroup, therefore this y-chromosome could play a significant role in determining Ethiopian endurance running success. Haplogroup T1a1a* was found in 14% of the elite marathon runners sample of whom 43% of this sample are from Arsi province. In addition, haplogroup T1a1a* was found in only 4% of the Ethiopian control sample and only 1% of the Arsi province control sample. T1a1a* is positively associated with aspects of endurance running, whereas E1b1b1 (old E3b1) is negatively associated.

=== Royal House of Khalifa ===
The House of Khalifa (Arabic: آل خليفة, romanized: Āl Khalīfah) is the ruling family of the Kingdom of Bahrain. The Al Khalifas profess Sunni Islam and belong to the Anizah tribe, some members of this tribe joined the Utub alliance which migrated from Central Arabia to Kuwait, then ruled all of Qatar, more specifically Al Zubarah, which they built and ruled over before settling in Bahrain in the early 17th century. The current head of the family is Hamad bin Isa Al Khalifa, who became the Emir of Bahrain in 1999 and proclaimed himself King of Bahrain in 2002, in fact becoming a constitutional monarch.

=== Thomas Jefferson ===
Thomas Jefferson

Phylogenetic network analysis of its Y-STR (short tandem repeat) haplotype shows that it is most closely related to an Egyptian K2 [now T/K1a] haplotype, but the presence of scattered and diverse European haplotypes within the network is nonetheless consistent with Jefferson's patrilineage belonging to an ancient and rare indigenous European type. This is supported by the observation that two of 85 unrelated British men sharing the surname Jefferson also share the President's Y-STR haplotype within haplogroup K2.

— Turi E. King et al.,

A notable member of the T-M184 haplogroup is the third US President, Thomas Jefferson. He reportedly belongs to a subclade of T-M184 which is most commonly found in the Iberian Peninsula (e.g. Spain). His most distant known ancestor is Samuel Jeffreason [sic], born 11 October 1607 at Pettistree, Suffolk, England, although there is also a widespread belief that the President had Welsh ancestry.

There was controversy for almost two centuries regarding allegations that Thomas Jefferson had fathered the children of his slave Sally Hemings. The controversy effectively began on 1 September 1802 with an article by James Callender, printed in a Richmond newspaper. An oral tradition in the Hemings family and other historical evidence was countered in the early 19th century by some Jefferson's grandchildren, who asserted that a son of Thomas Jefferson's sister, by the name of Carr, had been the father of Hemings' children. However, a 1998 study of Jefferson male-line DNA found that it matched that of a descendant of Sally Hemings' youngest son, Eston Hemings. Most historians now believe that Jefferson had a relationship with Hemings for 38 years, and probably fathered her seven known children, five of whom lived to adulthood. In addition, the testing conclusively disproved any connection between the Hemings descendant and the Carr male line.

== Subclades ==
=== Tree ===
Phylogenetic Tree of the Eurasian Haplogroup T-M184 and their closest macro-lineages
Latest 2015 tree (ISOGG 2015)

Branching of T-M184

- LT<br /> L298 (43900ybp)
  - LT*(xM184, M20)
    All cases without M184 or M20
  - TM184 (39,300‑45,100ybp)
    - T*(xL206)
      All cases without L206 or PH110
    - <br />T1L206 (26600ybp)
      - T1*(xM70)
        Syria
      - <br />T1aM70 (19,000-30,000ybp)
        - T1a*(xL162,L131,Y11151)
          All cases without L162, L131 or Y11151
        - <br />T1a1L162 (15400ybp)
          - T1a1*(xL208)
            Pityusic Islanders, Pontic Greeks from Giresun, Germany and Balkars.
          - <br />T1a1aL208 (14800ybp)
            - T1a1a*(xCTS11451, Y16897)
              All cases without CTS11451 or Y16897
            - <br />T1a1a1CTS11451 (9500ybp)
              - T1a1a1*(xY4119, Y6671)
                All cases without Y4119 or Y6671
              - <br />T1a1a1aY4119 (9200ybp)
                - T1a1a1a*(xCTS2214)
                  All cases without CTS2214
                - <br />T1a1a1a1CTS2214 (8900ybp)
    - T2<br />PH110 (26600ybp)
      Ossetian Irons, Leoneses, Germans and Bhutaneses
  - L<br />M20
    - L1<br />M22
      West Asia, Europe, Central and South Asia.
    - <br />L2<br />L595
      Widely widespread in Europe, where is found the highest diversity of this lineage.

Macro-Haplogroup LT

== Phylogenetic history ==
Prior to 2002, there were in academic literature at least seven naming systems for the Y-Chromosome Phylogenetic tree. This led to considerable confusion. In 2002, the major research groups came together and formed the Y-Chromosome Consortium (YCC). They published a joint paper that created a single new tree that all agreed to use. Later, a group of citizen scientists with an interest in population genetics and genetic genealogy formed a working group to create an amateur tree aiming at being above all timely. The table below brings together all of these works at the point of the landmark 2002 YCC Tree. This allows a researcher reviewing older published literature to quickly move between nomenclatures.

YCC 2002/2008 (Shorthand)	(α)	(β)	(γ)	(δ)	(ε)	(ζ)	(η)	YCC 2002 (Longhand)	YCC 2005 (Longhand)	YCC 2008 (Longhand)	YCC 2010r (Longhand)	ISOGG 2006	ISOGG 2007	ISOGG 2008	ISOGG 2009	ISOGG 2010	ISOGG 2011	ISOGG 2012	ISOGG 2013
T-M184	26	VIII	1U	25	Eu16	H5	F	K*	K	T	T	K2	K2	T	T	T	T	T	T
K-M70/T-M70	26	VIII	1U	25	Eu15	H5	F	K2	K2	T	T1	K2	K2	T	T	T	T1	T1a	T1a
T-P77	26	VIII	1U	25	Eu15	H5	F	K2	K2	T2	T1a2	K2	K2	T2	T2	T2a1	T1a1b	T1a1a1	T1a1a1

=== Original research publications ===
The following research teams per their publications were represented in the creation of the YCC Tree.

α Jobling and Tyler-Smith 2000 and Kaladjieva 2001

β Underhill 2000

γ Hammer 2001

δ Karafet 2001

ε Semino 2000

ζ Su 1999

η Capelli 2001
