= Haplogroup T1 =

Haplogroup T1 may refer to:

- a primary subclade of Haplogroup T (mtDNA) or;
- Haplogroup T-L206 (Y-DNA), also known as T1 – a primary subclade of haplogroup T (M184).
