= Alchi Monastery =

Buddhist monastery in Ladakh, India

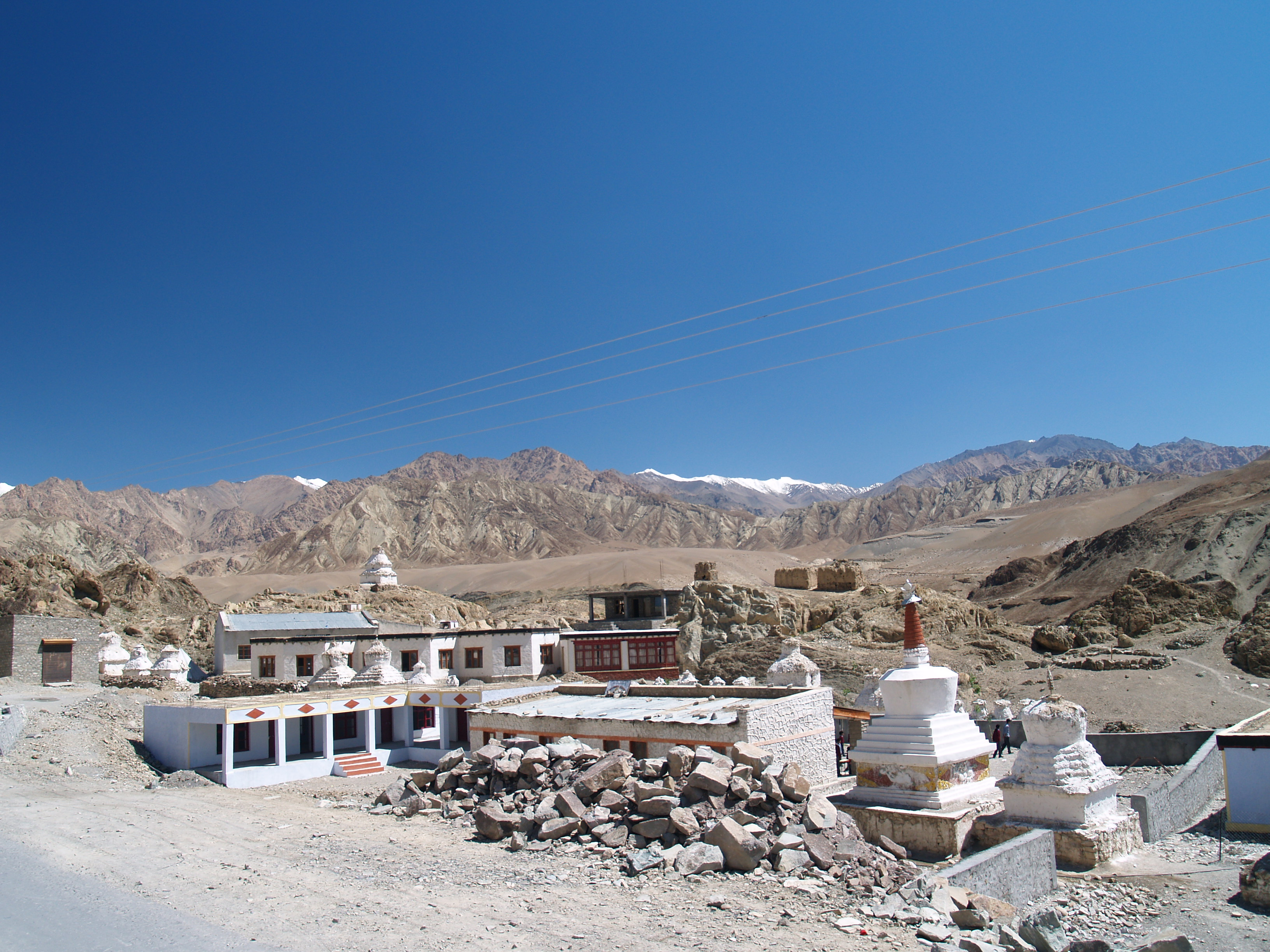
- Alchi Monastery

- Location in Ladakh Alchi Monastery (India)

Religion
- Affiliation: Tibetan Buddhism

Location
- Location: Alchi, Leh, Ladakh, India
- Coordinates: 34°13′N 77°10′E

Architecture
- Style: Gompa
- Founder: Rinchen Zangpo (958-1055 CE)
- Established: 958 - 1055; 971 years ago

Alchi Monastery (Tibetan: ཨ་ལྕི་ཆོས་འཁོར།) or Alchi Gompa (Tibetan: ཨ་ལྕི་དགོམ་པ།, also Alci) is a Tibetan Buddhist monastery, known more as a monastic complex (chos-'khor) of temples in Alchi village in the Leh District, under the Ladakh Autonomous Hill Development Council of the Union Territory of Ladakh, India. The complex comprises four separate settlements in the Alchi village in the lower Ladakh region with monuments dated to different periods. Of these four hamlets, Alchi monastery is said to be the oldest and most famous. It is administered by the Likir Monastery. It is 60 west of Leh on Leh-Kargil Highway.

Alchi is also part of the three villages (all in lower Ladakh region) which constitute the 'Alchi group of monuments'; the other two villages adjoining Alchi are the Mangyu and Sumda Chun. The monuments in these three villages are stated to be of "unique style and workmanship", but the Alchi monastic complex is the best known.

The Dukhang, or Assembly Hall and the Main Temple (gTsug-lag-khang), which is a three-storied temple called the Sumtseg (gSum-brtsegs, literally 'three-storied'), are built in the Kashmiri style as seen in many monasteries; the third temple is called the Manjushri Temple ('Jam-dpal lHa-khang). Chortens are also an important part of the complex.

The monastery complex was built, according to local tradition, by the great translator Guru Rinchen Zangpo between 958 and 1055. However, inscriptions in the preserved monuments ascribe the Sumtseg to a Tibetan noble called Kal-dan Shes-rab, and more recent translations of inscriptions in the Sumtseg and Dukhang suggest the Dukhang was built (and thus the complex founded) by an unnamed uncle of patron Tsültrim Ö about a generation prior, no earlier than 1140 CE.

The artistic and spiritual details of both Buddhist and the Hindu kings of the time in Kashmir and Himachal Pradesh are reflected in the wall paintings in the monastery. These are some of the oldest surviving paintings in Ladakh. The complex also has huge statues of the Buddha and elaborate wood carvings and art-work comparable to the baroque style. Shakti Maira has vividly explained the beauty of this small monastery.

== History ==
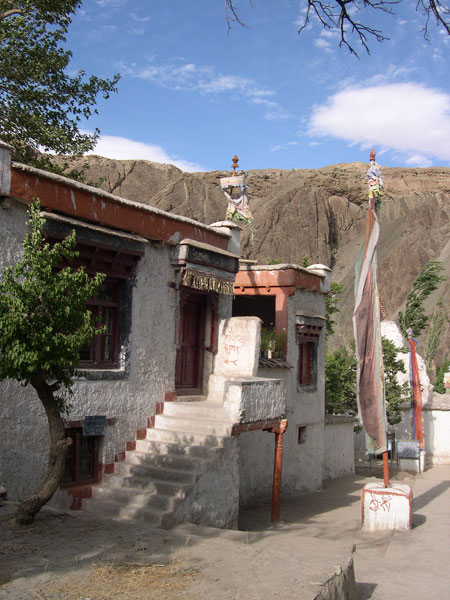
Alchi Monastery

The history of the monuments in the Alchi complex and in the other two villages in the Alchi group is not precise, in spite of many inscriptions and texts displayed on the walls. One inscription refers to the foundation of the monastery by a king and a queen, who may appear in the royal drinking scene from the murals at the entrance of the Dukhang, and dated to circa 1200 CE.

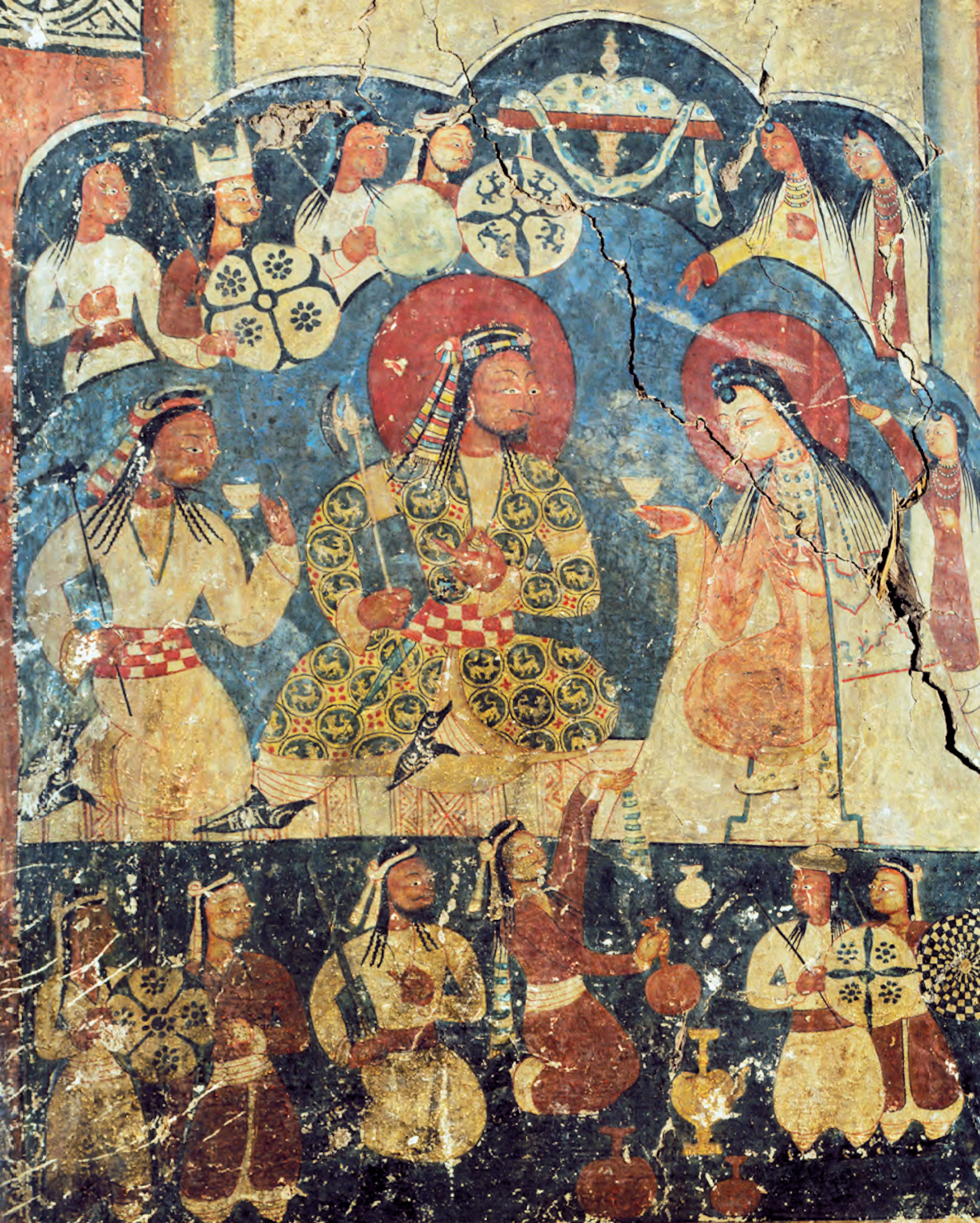
Royal drinking scene in the Dukhang at Alchi Monastery, circa 1200 CE. The king wears a decorated Qabā', of Turco-Persian style. It is similar to another royal scene at nearby Mangyu Monastery.

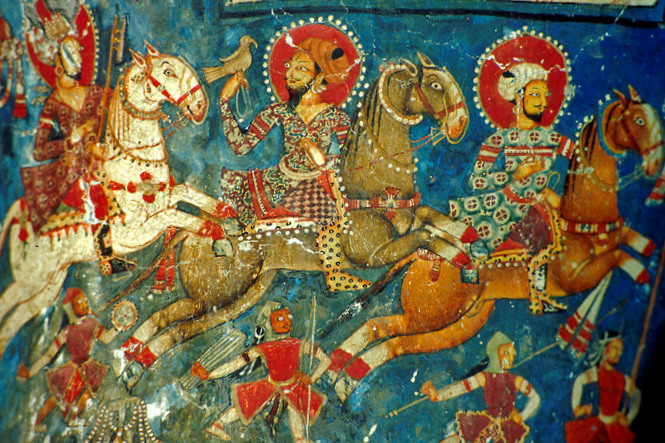
Alchi, Mural paintings - Alchi, gsum brtsegs temple, royal falcon scene on the dhotī of a monumental clay sculpture.

Traditionally, the creation of the Alchi complex is attributed to the famous scholar-translator Rinchen Zangpo (958–1055) in the 10th century, along with the Lamayuru Monastery, the Wanla, the Mang-gyu and the Sumda. During the tenth century, the Tibetan lama-king Yeshe-Ö of Guge, in order to spread Buddhism in the Trans Himalayan region, took the initiative by allocating 21 scholars to the region. However, due to harsh climatic and topographic conditions, only two survived, one of them the esteemed scholar and translator Rinchen Zangpo who established Buddhist activity in the Ladakh region and other areas of India including Tabo Gompa in Spiti, Himachal Pradesh, and Sikkim. During his sojourn there, he also went to the neighbouring countries of Nepal, Bhutan and Tibet. Zangpo became known by the epithet "Lochen," "Lotsawa Chenpo" or the "Great Translator"; he is credited with building 108 monasteries in the trans-Himalayan region in his quest to disseminate Buddhism. He institutionalized Buddhism in the region; these monasteries are considered the mainstay of Vajrayana Tibetan Buddhism. Zangpo engaged Kashmiri artists to create wall paintings and sculptures in the monasteries he is credited with building; only a few of these have survived. Out of these, the Alchi complex is remarkably well-preserved in terms of both art and architecture, and provides a rich history of both representative not only of Tibetan Buddhist tradition but of Persian styled courtly art.

Despite local tradition typically crediting Zangpo with Alchi's construction, this narrative is disputed based on cross-referenced inscriptions found throughout buildings of the complex. In the Sumtseg (Three-story temple), a partially damaged inscription known as the Garland of Butter Lamps (translated in full for the first time by Luczanits in 2023, based on Jaroslav Poncar's photographs), details the patrilineal genealogy of Sumtsek patron Tsültrim Ö, including references to an unnamed patrilineal uncle who the Sumtsek is dedicated to. A strikingly similar inscription in both prose and content, mentioning the same paternal uncle, is found in the Dukhang assembly hall, with the inscription itself attributed to Tibetan noble Kal-den Shes-rab. The genealogy found in these sets of inscriptions, corroborated by mentions of the king Wangdé, the late 11th century monarch of Guge, suggests that the Dukhang at Alchi was constructed by the uncle of Tsültrim Ö about a generation prior to the building of the Sumtseg, dating Alchi to (at very earliest) 1140 CE.

Since the monasteries of this period did not belong to any of the established Tibetan schools, they were initially brought under the control of the Kadampa order. When the condition of the monasteries deteriorated, they were mostly taken over by the Gelukpa order, with the exception of Lamayuru which was placed under the Drikungpa sect. After worship at Alchi monastery ceased for unknown reasons in the fifteenth century, it later came under the Gelugpa sect controlled from Likir.

== Geography and visitor information ==
Alchi is located on the south bank of the Indus River at an altitude of 3,100 metres (10,200 ft) and 65 kilometres (40 mi) outside of Leh (to its west). Leh is connected by air from Delhi. The road approach to Leh starts at Manali, a route that is accessible from May or June to October, depending on the snow fall conditions in the valley. The village is in the high altitude rain shadow area of Ladakh. It is laid out in four settlements on the banks of a tributary of the Indus River. The monastic complex is separate from the other village settlements.

== Structures ==
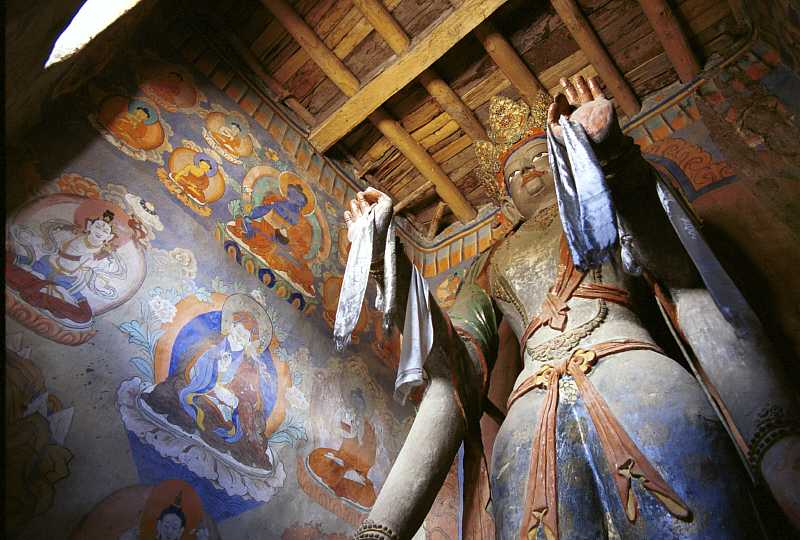
An image of Tara in Alchi Monastery

The monastery complex has three major shrines: the Dukhang (Assembly hall), the Sumtsek and the Temple of Manjushri, all dating from between the early 12th and early 13th centuries. Chortens are also an important part of the complex. In addition, the Alchi complex has two other important temples, the Translator's temple called the 'Lotsawa Lakhang' and a new temple called the 'Lakhang Soma'. This collection of four small shrines in the Alchi village has been described by The Hindu:

... as a jewel of colours and forms that is so utterly beautiful that the normal state of breathlessness in this high altitude becomes a deep gasp.

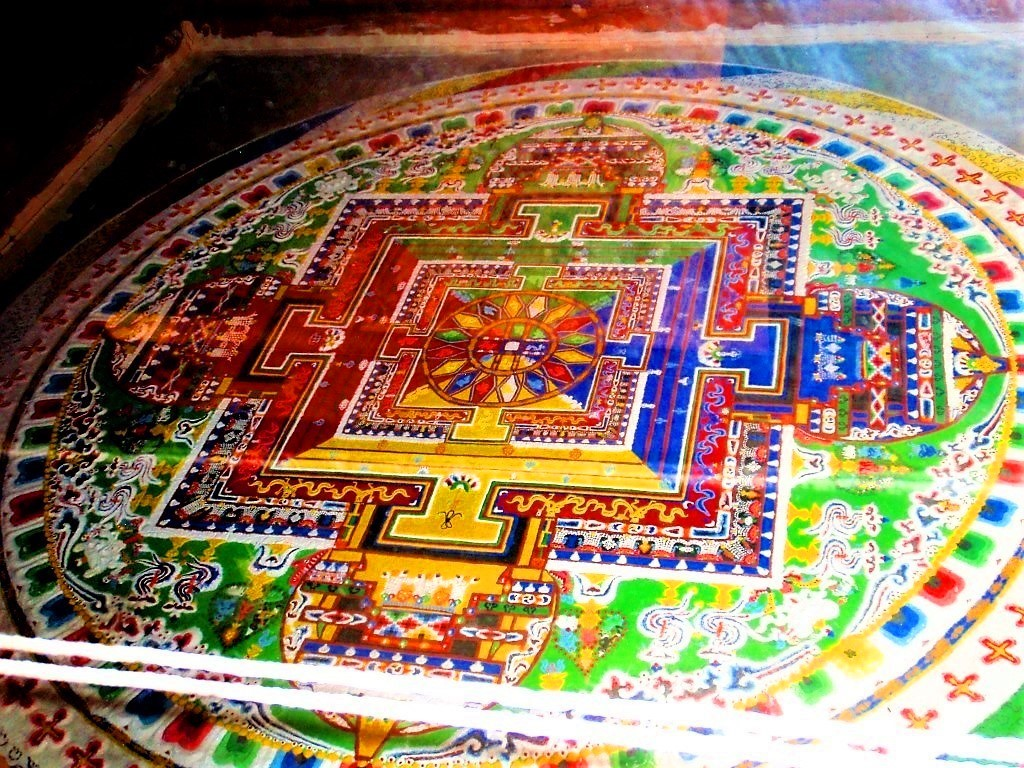
Sand Mandala, Alchi Monastery, near Leh

The artistic and spiritual details of both Buddhism and the Hindu kings of that time in Kashmir are reflected in the wall paintings in the monastery complex. These are some of the oldest surviving paintings in Ladakh. The complex also has huge statues of the Buddha and "lavish wood carvings and art-work — almost baroque in style." Shakti Maira vividly explains the beauty of this small monastery as "stylistically rendered in an eclectic mix of Tibetan and Kashmiri faces and clothes."

=== Dukhang ===
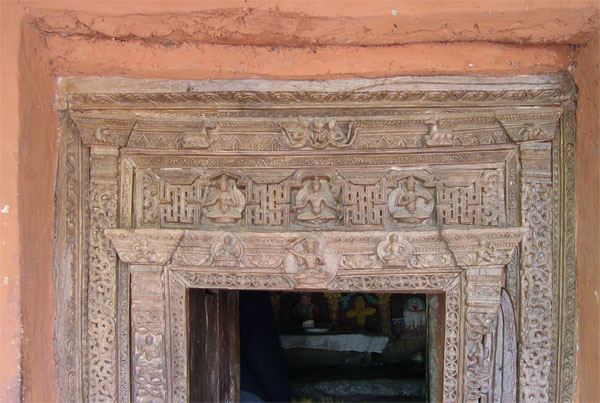
Entrance door portal of Manjushri temple

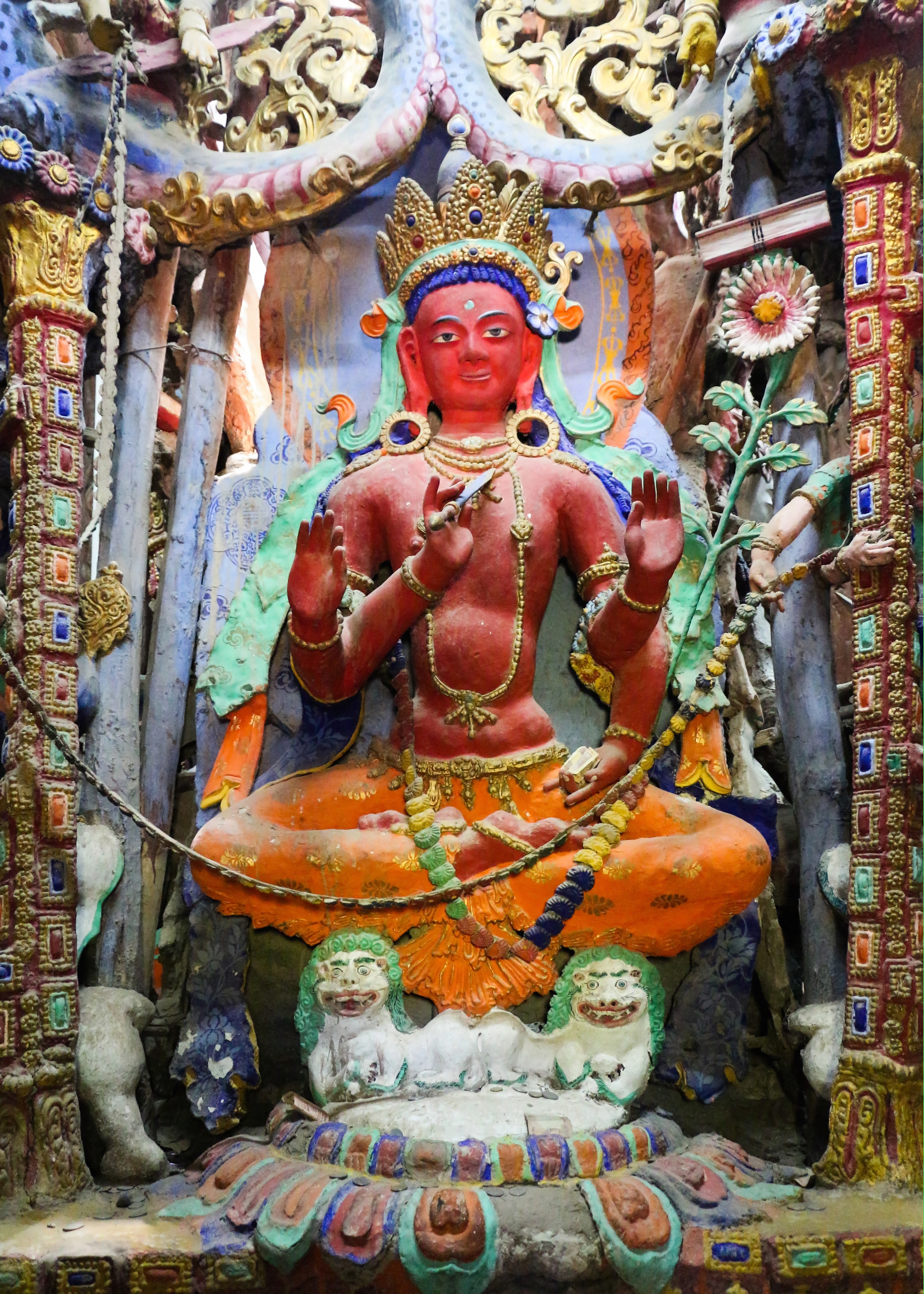
Sculpture in Alchi Monastery

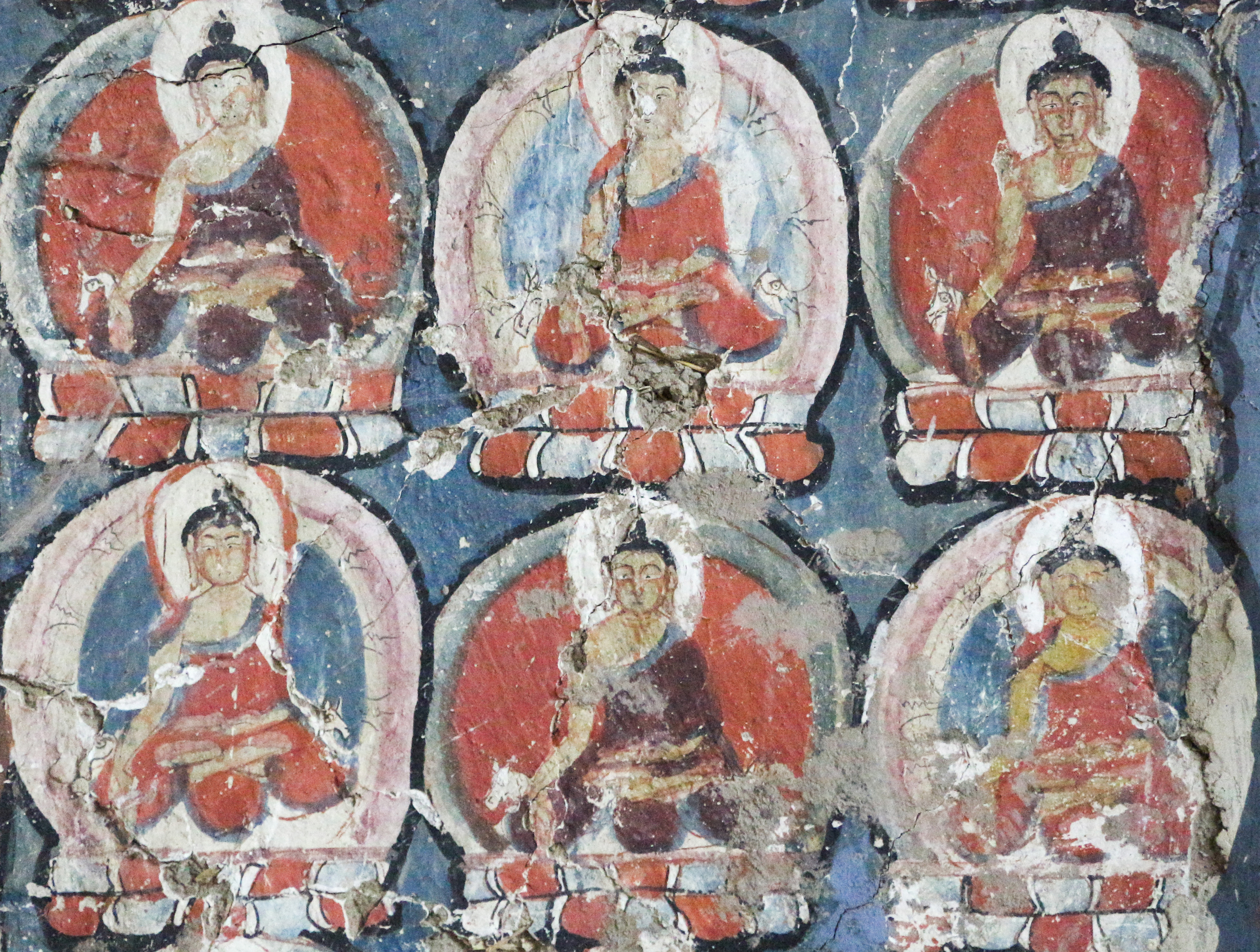
Detail of a fresco

Dukhang or the Assembly Hall is at the heart of the monastery complex, where monks perform worship and ceremonies. It is large and ancient, and the original wooden door frame is retained. Many additions were made to the ancient structure during the 12th and 13th centuries. The colonnaded veranda leads to the hall from a front courtyard and frescoes of one thousand Buddhas are depicted in the passageway. The Wheel of Life and Mahakal can be seen at the outer gate. The walls of the Dukhang, dedicated to Panch Tathāgatas, are painted with six different mandalas that surround the Vairochana, the main deity worshipped in the hall. The mandalas are set among by many paintings of Buddhas, Bodhisattvas, goddesses, fierce divinities and guardians of dharma, and also lesser divinities.

=== Sumtseg ===
The Alchi Sumtseg in the Alchi complex is one of the most outstanding, but its purpose is not clearly established. The Sumtseg (gSum-brtsegs) means a three storied building, though small, was built with loam and natural stone (reflected in the bland exterior) in the Tibetan building tradition. However, the luxuriant woodwork columns, facades, walls, clay images and paintings in the interior of the monastery were made by Kashmiri artists. The sanctum in the ground floor and the first floor measures 5.4 metres (18 ft)x5.8 metres (19 ft) with the niches of 2.1–2.7 metres (6.9–8.9 ft) width and 4 metres (13 ft) height (niches in the main wall are larger in size vis-a-vis the side walls). The niches depict the main images of three Bodhisattvas (all in standing posture and about 4 metres (13 ft) in height) and its associate secondary deities (four in each niche) with two flying goddesses in each niche. Except for the main wooden door on the top floor, which is dilapidated, the rest of the Sumtseg is well preserved in its original form, as built in the early 13th century. The second floor of the building is more in the form of a balcony with a lantern mounting. Image of Maitreya, the largest in size (4.63 metres (15.2 ft)), is deified on the back wall and flanked by the images of Avalokiteshwara to its right and Manjushri to its left. An interesting aspect of the elegant drapery (dhotis) worn by the deities is the display of different themes printed in different textile patterns; Maitreya's dhoti depicts the life of Buddha, the Avlokiteshwara's dhoti shows holy places and royal palaces and Manjushri's dhoti has adepts (of 84 Mahasiddhas) printed on it. Iconographically, the deities have a single head with four arms but differently portrayed. Each deity is identified to a different Buddha. Maitreya has a five Buddha crown representing Vairochana. Avalokiteshwara's crown represents Amitabha and Manjushri's crown represents Akshobhya. An inscription in the main niche states that the three images are reliquaries representing body, speech and mind-compared to the three bodies of the Buddha-namely, Maitreya denoting the Buddha body of reality, Avolokiteshwara representing pure rapture and Manjushri representing emanational body. In simple terms, they represent the Buddhist concepts of Compassion, Hope and Wisdom.

Further, depiction of Buddha's life in textile prints on the dhoti is a unique representation of the cycle of the life of Buddha that is arranged in a reverse sequence. It is in medallion form painted red, with each medallion measuring 15 centimetres (5.9 in) over a blue background. 48 scenes representing 41 episodes with five preaching scenes and two scenes of punarnirvana – all are arranged in pre-determined sequence representing the events in Buddha's life between the last journey in Tushita heaven and the first sermon in Sarnath.

Dating of the Sumtseg has been made on the basis of the names of the priests inscribed on the top floor of the structure. The last name inscribed is that of the Drigungpa school of Drigungpa or Jigten Gonpo (1143–1217) from which it is inferred that Sumsteg was established in the early 13th century.

=== Manjushri Temple ===
From various analysis of the iconography of the temple compared with that of the Sumtseg and Sumda Assembly hall, it has been inferred that the temple dates to around 1225 AD. Manjushri Temple, also called 'Jampe Lhakhang', is built around the four central images of Manjushri (seated back to back) seen on a common platform that is 5.7 metres (19 ft) square. Four pillars form the enclosure for the images; the pillars are supported with cross bracing connected to the painted wood ceiling. The paintings on the wooden ceiling are similar to those in the Sumtseg and the two chortens, but are unrefined. Located close to the Indus river, the temple is not well preserved except for wood carvings on the doors and pillars. The Lhotsava or Lotsawa temple to its left side is a later addition. The Manjushri images are on a common pedestal (85 centimetres (33 in) high), painted recently to give an overall picture of fright since the decorative scrolls are derived from the tails of Makara surrounded by images of animals, gods and symbols. The normal colour attributed to Manjushri images is orange, but in this temple they are depicted with different colours.

Each of the four images is single-headed with four arms that are adorned with a sword, a book on top of a lotus, a bow and an arrow. Each wall in the shrine is dedicated to a Buddha image. Manjushri is depicted on the main wall, seated on a lion throne; the side walls have images of Amitabha on the right and Aksharabhya on the left. The images are set around the central image of Manjushri in a niche in the wall. Manjushri is adorned with jewellery (pearls and other moulded forms) and a crown made of a flower band. In the base of the throne on which the Manjushri image is deified, is a depiction of 'Seven Jewels' and 'Eight Suspicious Symbols' (flanked by lions) enclosed in a square frame that is distinctive. The top of the throne frame has makara mountings.

=== Chortens ===
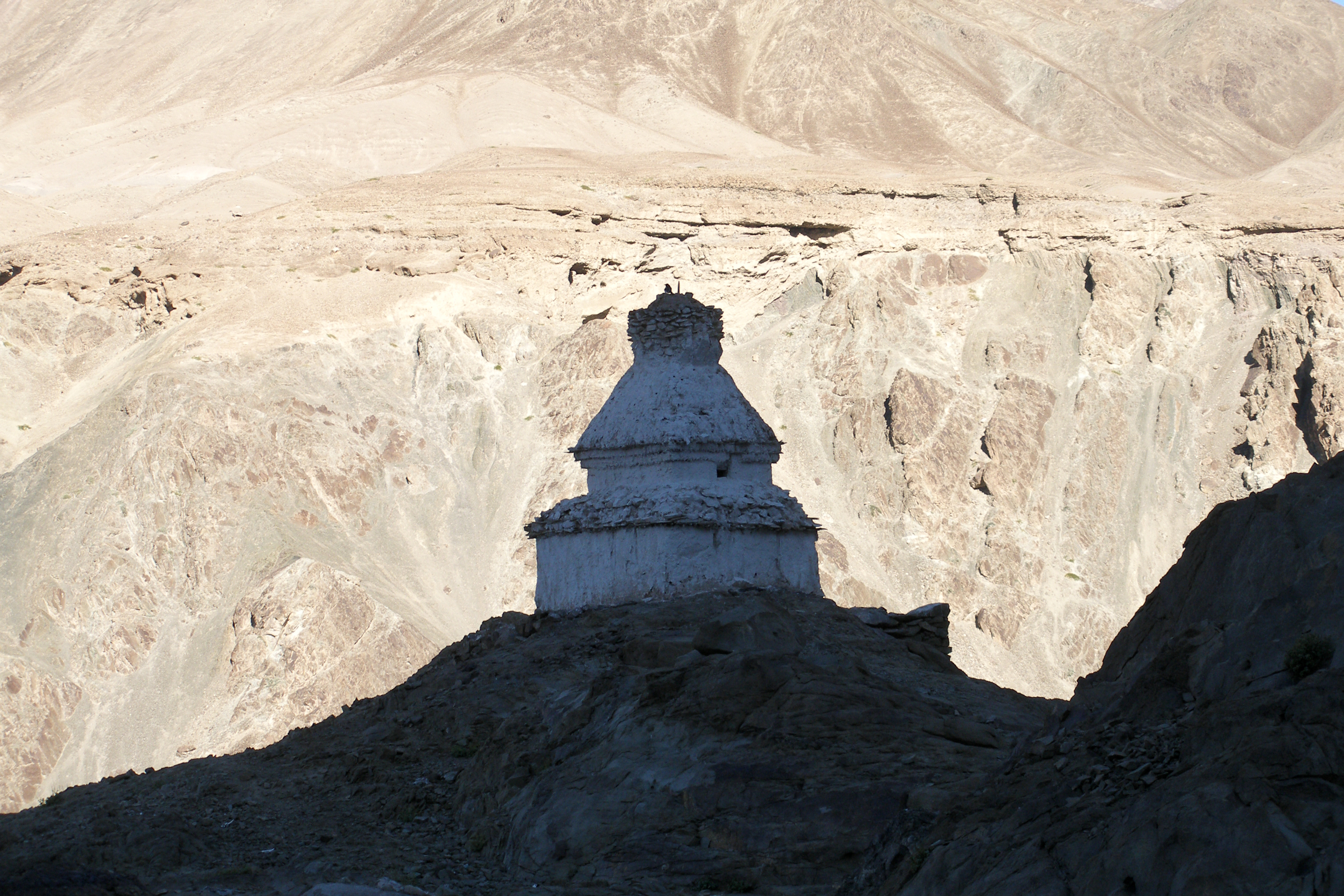
Alchi chorten

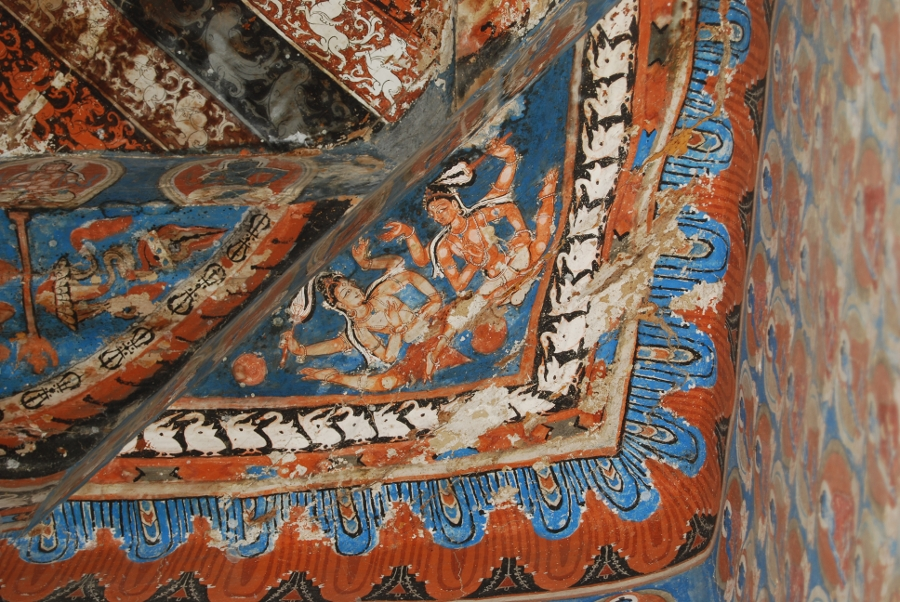
Photo is of painted ceiling of chorten in the complex, paintings supposed to be of 12th/13th century AD.

The earliest recorded Chortens are the Great Chorten and the Small Chorten (stupa) to the early 13th century, following the building of the Sumtseg. These chortens are decorated gateways known locally as 'Kakani Chörten' and 'Ka-ka-ni mchod-rten' that are considered unique to Alchi with historical link to other monuments. More chortens were added between the 13th and 14th centuries. In the Alchi complex, there are also three other chortens, which have ancient paintings.

== See also ==
- Three hares
- List of buddhist monasteries in Ladakh
- Tourism in Ladakh

== Bibliography ==
- Kapadia, Harish. (1999). Spiti: Adventures in the Trans-Himalaya. Second Edition. Indus Publishing Company, New Delhi. ISBN 81-7387-093-4.
- Janet Rizvi. (1996). Ladakh: Crossroads of High Asia. Second Edition. Oxford University Press, Delhi. ISBN 0-19-564546-4.
- Cunningham, Alexander. (1854). LADĀK: Physical, Statistical, and Historical with Notices of the Surrounding Countries. London. Reprint: Sagar Publications (1977).
- Francke, A. H. (1977). A History of Ladakh. (Originally published as, A History of Western Tibet, (1907). 1977 Edition with critical introduction and annotations by S. S. Gergan & F. M. Hassnain. Sterling Publishers, New Delhi.
- Francke, A. H. (1914). Antiquities of Indian Tibet. Two Volumes. Calcutta. 1972 reprint: S. Chand, New Delhi.
- Sarina Singh, et al. India. (2007). 12th Edition. Lonely Planet. ISBN 978-1-74104-308-2.
- Schettler, Margaret & Rolf. (1981) Kashmir, Ladakh & Zanskar. Lonely Planet, South Yarra, Vic., Australia.
- Tucci, Giuseppe. (1988). Rin-chen-bzan-po and the Renaissance of Buddhism in Tibet Around the Millennium. First Italian Edition 1932. First draft English translation by Nancy Kipp Smith, under the direction of Thomas J. Pritzker. Edited by Lokesh Chandra. English version of Indo-Tibetica II. Aditya Rakashan, New Delhi. ISBN 81-85179-21-2.
