= Manji =

Manji may refer to:

- Sikh Manji, a religious administrative unit in Sikhism
- The Japanese name of the 卍 character (from Chinese wàn zì)
- Manji (era), a Japanese era name
- A type of sai (weapon), a traditional Okinawan weapon
- The alternative term for a charpai
- Manji (蠻子), an old term for Southern China

== Arts and entertainment ==
- Manji (raga), one of the Ragams of Carnatic music
- Manji, the original Japanese title of the 1928 novel Quicksand by Jun'ichirō Tanizaki
  - Manji (film), the title of several film adaptations of the novel

== People ==
- Irshad Manji (born 1968), Canadian author
- Firoze Manji (born 1950), Kenyan activist, author and CEO
- Hafeez Manji (born 1987), Kenyan cricketer
- Manji Khan (1888–1937), Hindustani Classical vocalist of the Jaipur-Atrauli Gharana
- Manji Terashima (1898–1983), Japanese photographer
- Manji Fukushima, Japanese table tennis player
- Raf Manji (born 1966), a New Zealand politician

== Popular culture ==
- Manji, level 3 from quest 1 of the video game The Legend of Zelda
- Manji Clan, Yoshimitsu's clan in the Tekken series of video games
- Manji Cult, appeared in the 1998 PS1 video game Tenchu: Stealth Assassins
- Manji, an organization in the Soulcalibur game series
- Manji, a character in the role-playing game MapleStory
- Manji, the main character of the manga series Blade of the Immortal by Hiroaki Samura
- Tokyo Manji Gang, the main group from the manga series Tokyo Revengers by Ken Wakui

== See also ==
- Manj (disambiguation)
- Manjhi (disambiguation)
- Mangi (disambiguation)
- Manzi (disambiguation)
- Mangi Dam (disambiguation)
