= Majhi =

Majhi may mean:

- of, from, or related to Majha, a region in Punjab in India and Pakistan
  - Majhi dialect, the principal dialect of Punjabi
  - Majhail, speakers of the Majhi dialect from the Majha region of Punjab
- Majhi people, an ethnic group of Nepal and Sikkim
  - Majhi language, their Indo-Aryan language
- Bote-Majhi language, another Indo-Aryan language of Nepal

== People ==
=== Given name ===
- Majhi Sawaiyan (born 1981), Indian Olympic archer
- Majhi Ramdas Tudu (1854–1951), Indian Santali writer and educator

=== Surname ===
- Alok Kumar Majhi, Indian politician from West Bengal
- Balabhadra Majhi, Indian politician from Odisha
- Bhagirathi Majhi (1954–2020), Indian politician from Odisha
- Bishnu Majhi (born 1986), Nepali folk singer
- Duryodhan Majhi (1938–2022), Indian politician from Odisha
- Joba Majhi, Indian politician from Jharkhand
- Laxmirani Majhi (born 1989), Indian Olympic archer
- Mohan Charan Majhi, Indian politician from Odisha
- Parsuram Majhi (born 1961), Indian politician from Odisha
- Pradeep Kumar Majhi (born 1976), Indian politician from Odisha
- Shankhlal Majhi (born 1955), Indian politician from Uttar Pradesh
- Tilka Majhi (1750–1785), Indian Santali freedom fighter

== See also ==
- Manjhi (disambiguation)
- Majhail (film), a 2025 Indian Punjabi-language action film
- Ishar Singh Majhail (1901–1977), Indian politician
