= Mangi, Solapur district =

Village in Maharashtra

Mangi
- village
- Location in Maharashtra, India Mangi (India)
- Country: India
- State: Maharashtra
- District: Solapur district

Languages
  - Official: Marathi
- Time zone: UTC+5:30 (IST)

Mangi is a village in the Karmala taluka of Solapur district in Maharashtra state, India.

== Demographics ==
Covering 1,389 hectares (3,430 acres) and comprising 415 households at the time of the 2011 census of India, Mangi had a population of 1989. There were 1017 males and 972 females, with 298 people being aged six or younger.

== See also ==
- Mangi Dam
