= Caçarelhos e Angueira =

- Civil parish
- Location in Portugal
- Coordinates: 41.566°N 6.435°W
- Country: Portugal
- Region: Norte
- Intermunic. comm.: Terras de Trás-os-Montes
- District: Bragança
- Municipality: Vimioso

Area
  - Total: 53.16 km^{2} (20.53 sq mi)

Population (2011)
  - Total: 335
  - Density: 6.30/km^{2} (16.3/sq mi)
- Time zone: UTC+00:00 (WET)
  - Summer (DST): UTC+01:00 (WEST)

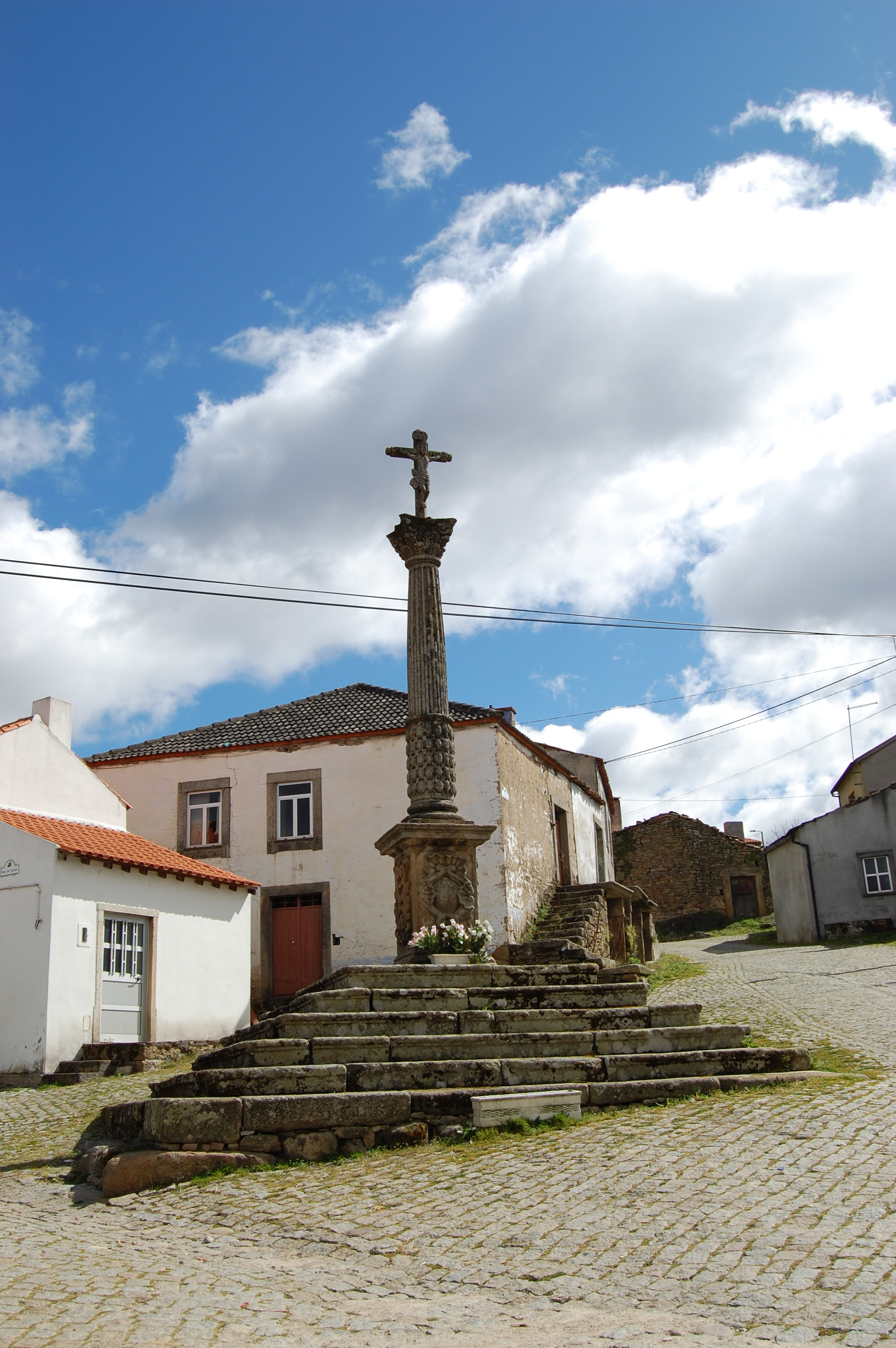
Caçarelhos

Caçarelhos e Angueira (Portuguese pronunciation: [kɐ.sɐˈɾɐ.ʎuʃ ˈi ɐ̃ˈɡɐj.ɾɐ]) (Mirandese: Caçareilhos i Angueira, Mirandese pronunciation: [ka.s̻aˈɾəj.ʎʊs̺ ˈi ãˈɡəj.ɾa]) is a civil parish in the municipality of Vimioso, Portugal. It was formed in 2013 by the merger of the former parishes Caçarelhos and Angueira. The population in 2011 was 335, in an area of 53.16 km².
