= Mange (disambiguation) =

Mange is a skin disease.

Mange may also refer to:

- several other skin diseases like demodectic mange, psoroptic mange, or notoedric mange
- Mange Temple, in China

== People with the name ==
- Anil Mange Bollywood film actor
- Gloria Mange (1931–2023), Mexican actress
- James Mange (born 1955), South African former political prisoner and reggae musician
- José Mange (1866–1935), French painter
- Mangé Demba (died 1822), African ruler
- Mange Kimambi (born 1980), Tanzanian social media influencer and political activist
- Mange Ram Garg (1935/6–2019), Indian politician
- Mange Schmidt (born 1973), Swedish rapper
- Pierre Mange (1905–1992), Swiss equestrian

== See also ==
- Mangue (disambiguation)
- Manj (disambiguation)
