= Sumda Chun =

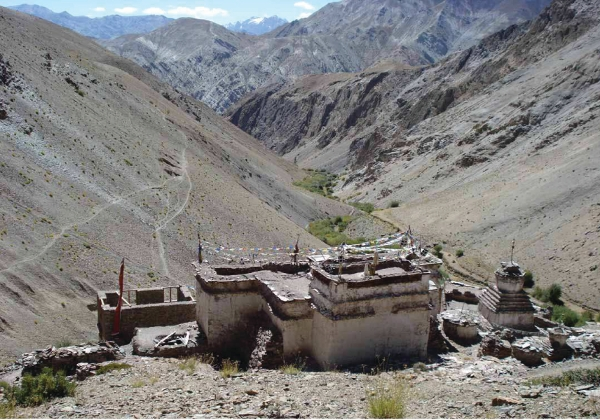
- The temple at Sumda Chun - verso

- Location within Ladakh
- Coordinates: 34°8′0.93″N 77°9′2.73″E

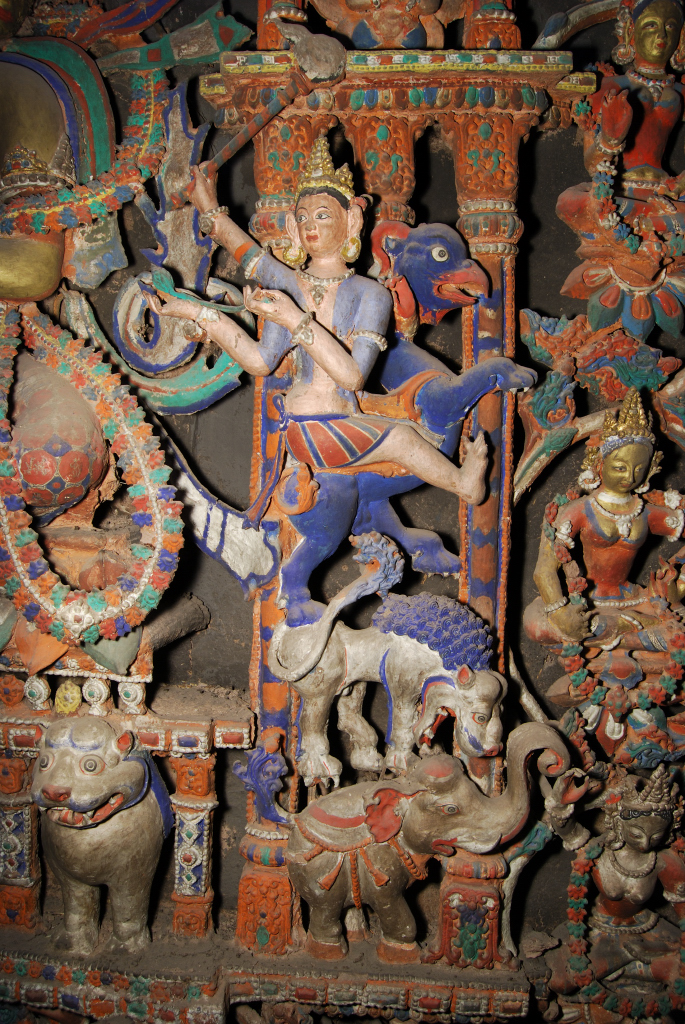

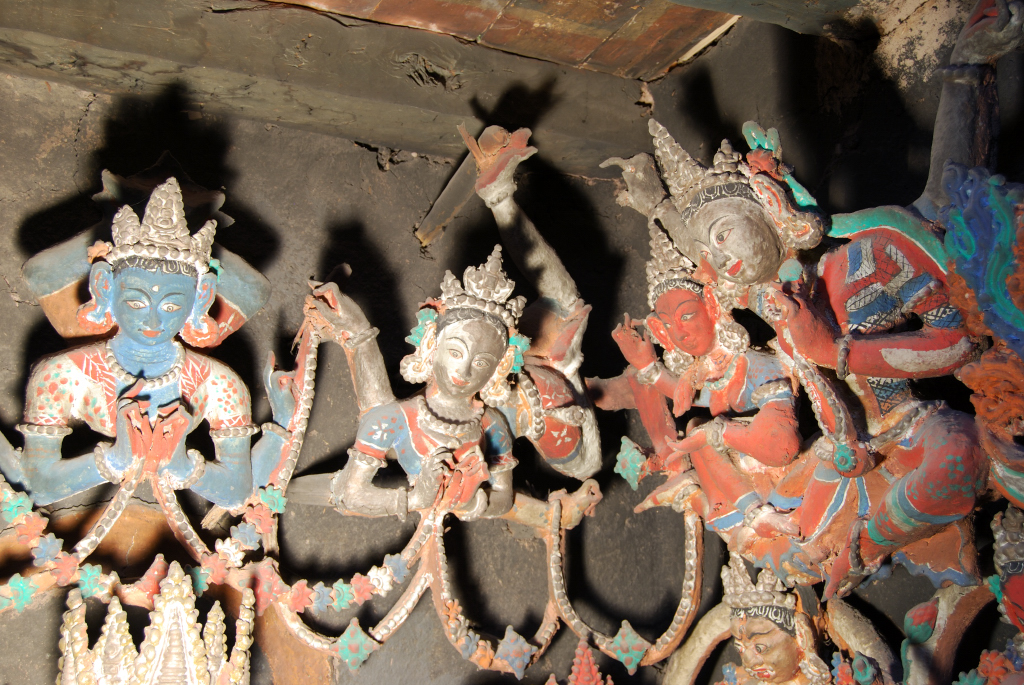

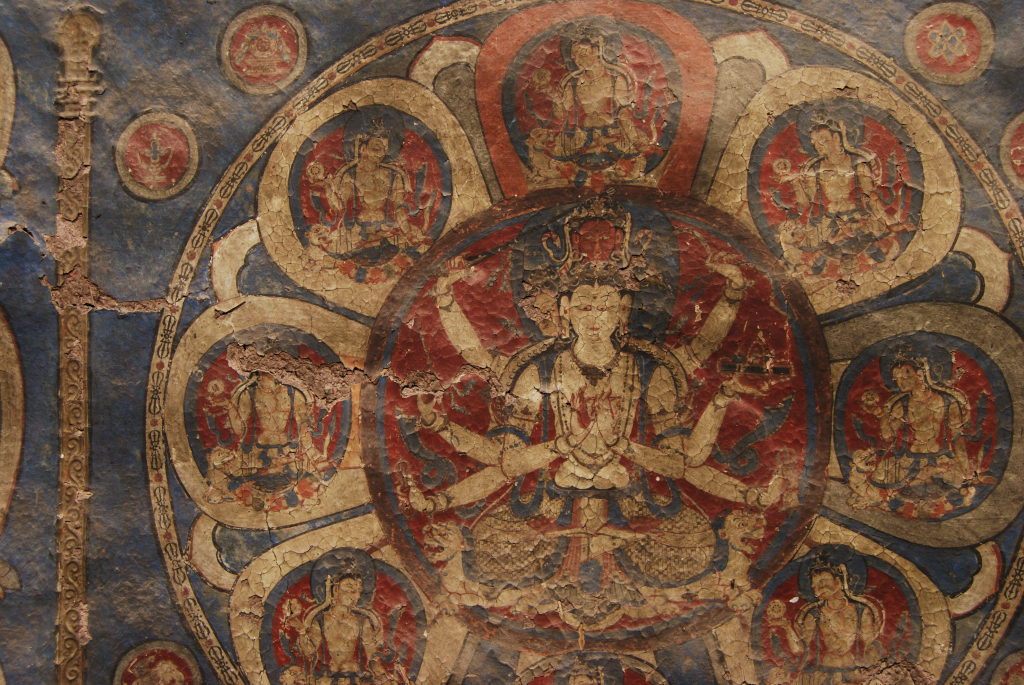

Temple at Sumda Chun, an early Tibetan Buddhist temple and monastery is located in the Sumda Chun village, in the district of Leh in Ladakh, India.

The temple at Sumda Chun is under the management of Hemis Monastery that appoints monks for conducting daily rituals and takes care of any major intervention in the temple. Temple which was originally part of a Gompa that existed at Sumda Chun has been attributed to the period of Lotsawa Rinchen Zangpo (957-1055), and is believed to be one of the three temples founded by him in one night along with those at Alchi Monastery and Mangyu. This faith of the Buddhists puts this temple at a very important status thereby placing it in the Sumda-Mangyu-Alchi pilgrimage track that the pilgrims try to do in a single day. Sumda Chun village is at a height of 3500 metres from the sea level and is accessible by road since 2019. Sumda Chun village lived in darkness till August 2017 with no electricity before the village and monastery were electrified by Global Himalayan Expedition team in August 2017. The population of about 120 people staying in the village also contributes an active part in the day by day activities of the temple in the form of offerings to the temple and manpower for its maintenance. The artwork of the temple is exquisite, and the shrine in the assembly hall houses the Vajradhatumahamandala, made of clay sculptures, which can be considered one of the finest in the Western Himalayas.

The temple was listed as one of the 100 most endangered sites in World Monument Funds 2006 Watch List before its conservation.

== Access ==
Sumda Chun Monastery is around 65 km to the southwest of Leh, which is connected by a motorable road, up to Sumdo. The track starts ascending to the west, through a gorge from the left bank of the stream. At one point, the track crosses to the right bank and ascent becomes little more difficult. One or two houses come in the way before another gorge appears on the right which leads to the Sumda chon Monastery and towards the left leads to Sumda Chenmo. This track goes along the stream with plantations of Willow. After walking for an hour the monastery appears above the village houses. There is another short track from Alchi village through Stakspila, the ascent from Alchi is more difficult and long compare to Sumda side.

== Conservation ==
5 year program of architectural conservation and conservation of artworks in the temple that include paintings and sculptures in the shrine was carried out by Namgyal Institute for Research on Ladakhi Art and Culture and the conservation. The conservation program was funded by the World Monuments Fund. A technical study of the wall paintings inside the temple is also published. The conservation project of Sumda Chun was awarded "Award of excellence" by UNESCO Asia-Pacific Awards for Cultural Heritage Conservation in the year 2011.

A unique painted chorten within the temple complex, dating to the 13th century, was conserved in collaboration with the Himalayan Cultural Heritage Foundation. The conservation project was funded by World Monuments Fund in August 2013.

World Monuments Fund video on conservation of Sumda Chun

== See also ==
- List of buddhist monasteries in Ladakh
- Geography of Ladakh
- Tourism in Ladakh
- World Monuments Fund
