= Guglielmo Manzi =

Italian classicist and librarian

Guglielmo Manzi (25 August 1784 - 21 February 1821) was an Italian classicist and librarian of what was then the Biblioteca Barberiniana.

== Biography ==
He was born in Civitavecchia. He studied first at Montefiascone, then with the Oratorians in Rome. First, he went to work in Livorno with his mercantile family. But his erudition gained him a position as librarian in the Barberini collection. The library became part of the Vatican Library in 1902. He made a career of republishing out-of-print works, or their translations.

In 1814, he translated into Italian the text of Istoria romana di Cajo Vellejo Patercolo. In 1816, Orazioni di Stefano Porcari (Speeches by 15th-century political opponent of civic Papal authority); in 1818, he wrote Discorso sopra gli spettacoli, le feste ed i lusso degli Italiani nel secolo XIV. In 1815, in honour of his patron, he edited Regimento dei costumi delle donne written by Francesco da Barberino. He published in 1819 Dialoghi di Luciano di Samosata under the pseudonymous name of Lo-anna. He published a treatise on painting, putatively written by Leonardo da Vinci, and collected by Francesco Melzi.

In 1818, he edited Viaggio di Lionardo di Niccolò Frescobaldi, in Egitto e in Terra Santa, con un discorso dell'editore sopra il commercio degl'italiani nel secolo XIV. The manuscript describes the travels of the Florentine merchant, Leonardo Frescobaldi, in 13814-1385 to the Levant. Manzi added a commentary on travels by Tuscan merchants in that era.

He also edited in 1817 Trattati della compunzione del cuore di San Giovanni Grisostomo. He also edited the translation of the writing of Cicero. He died in Rome.
