= Argozelo =

- Civil parish
- Location in Portugal
- Coordinates: 41.643°N 6.602°W
- Country: Portugal
- Region: Norte
- Intermunic. comm.: Terras de Trás-os-Montes
- District: Bragança
- Municipality: Vimioso

Area
  - Total: 29.53 km^{2} (11.40 sq mi)

Population (2011)
  - Total: 701
  - Density: 23.7/km^{2} (61.5/sq mi)
- Time zone: UTC+00:00 (WET)
  - Summer (DST): UTC+01:00 (WEST)

Argozelo (Portuguese pronunciation: [ɐɾ.ɣuˈze.lu]) (Mirandese: Argozeilho, Mirandese pronunciation: [aɾ.ɣʊˈz̻əj.ʎʊ]) is a civil parish in the municipality of Vimioso, Portugal. The population in 2011 was 701, in an area of 29.53 km².
