= Pamela Manzi =

Italian chemist

Pamela Manzi is an Italian biologist, who was active in the fields of analytical chemistry and food science; she has been a researcher of the "Istituto nazionale di ricerca per gli alimenti e la nutrizione" (INRAN) since 1996.

== Works ==
- Panfili G, Manzi P, Pizzoferrato L, (1994) HPLC simultaneous determination of tocopherol, carotenes, retinol and its geometric isomers in Italian cheeses. Analyst 119, 1161-1165.
- Manzi P, Panfili G, Pizzoferrato L, (1996) Normal and reversed phase HPLC for more complete evaluation of tocopherols, retinols, carotenes and sterols in dairy products. Chromatographia 43, 89-93.
- Panfili G, Manzi P, Pizzoferrato L, (1998) Influence of thermal and other manufacturing stresses on retinol isomerization in milk and dairy products. J Dairy Res 65, 253-260.
- Manzi P, Pizzoferrato L, (2000) Beta-glucans in edible mushrooms. Food Chem 68, 315-318.
- Manzi P, Aguzzi A, Pizzoferrato L, (2001) Nutritional value of mushrooms widely consumed in Italy. Food Chem 73(3), 321-325.

== Literature ==
- Milch als treibender Motor in der Wirtschaft // Südtirol News, 4 April 2018.
- James MacDonald: Got (Cockroach) Milk? Is cockroach milk the next hot super food? // JSTOR Daily, 4 September 2016.

== Web-sources ==
- "Pamela Manzi". Centro di Ricerca per gli Alimenti e la Nutrizione (CREA).
