= Vimioso =

- Municipality
- Town of Vimioso
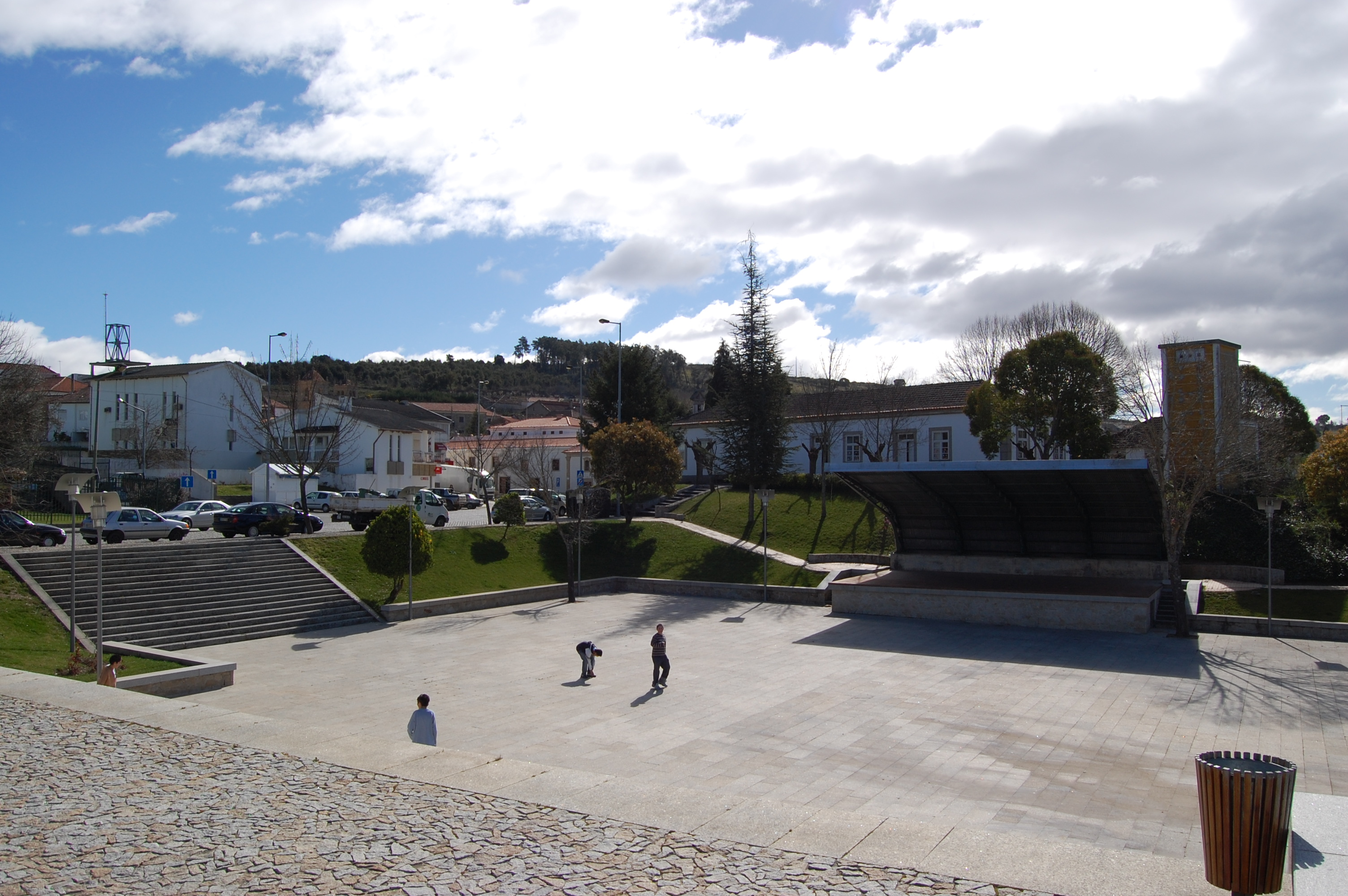
- Main square in the centre of Vimioso

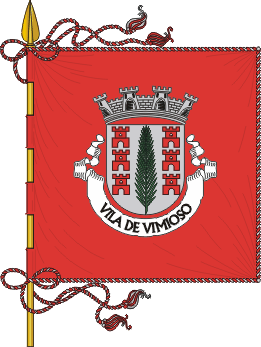
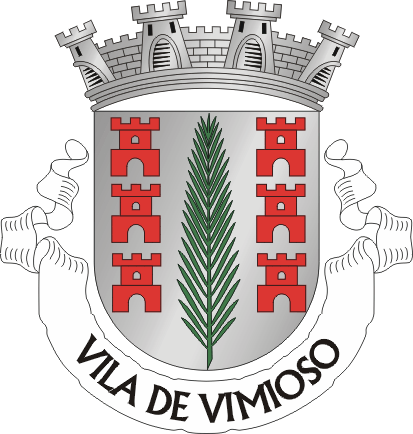
- Flag Coat of arms
- Interactive map of Vimioso
- Coordinates: 41°35′1″N 6°31′42″W
- Country: Portugal
- Region: Norte
- Intermunic. comm.: Terras de Trás-os-Montes
- District: Bragança
- Parishes: 10 (list)

Government
  - President: José Baptista Rodrigues (PPD-PSD)

Area
  - Total: 481.59 km^{2} (185.94 sq mi)
- Elevation: 668 m (2,192 ft)

Population (2011)
  - Total: 4,669
  - Density: 9.695/km^{2} (25.11/sq mi)
- Time zone: UTC+00:00 (WET)
  - Summer (DST): UTC+01:00 (WEST)
- Postal code: 5230
- Area code: 273
- Website: http://www.cm-vimioso.pt

Vimioso (Portuguese: [vi.miˈo.zu]), officially Town of Vimioso (Portuguese: Vila de Vimioso; Mirandese: Bila de Bumioso, Mirandese pronunciation: [βila ðə βuˈmjo.z̺ʊ]) is a town and municipality in the Tierra de Miranda, in the district of Bragança in the northern part of Portugal. The population in 2011 was 4,669, in an area of 481.59 km². It is recognised as having a significant number of Mirandese speakers.

In 1516, Vimioso was elevated to the administrative status of a village by order of King Manual I.

== Geography ==
=== Climate ===
Climate data for Pinelo, Vimioso, altitude: 607 m (1,991 ft)
Month	Jan	Feb	Mar	Apr	May	Jun	Jul	Aug	Sep	Oct	Nov	Dec	Year
Average precipitation mm (inches)	81 (3.2)	71 (2.8)	47 (1.9)	51 (2.0)	59 (2.3)	32 (1.3)	12 (0.5)	10 (0.4)	34 (1.3)	75 (3.0)	84 (3.3)	83 (3.3)	639 (25.3)
Source: Portuguese Environment Agency

=== Parishes ===
The municipality is composed of 10 parishes:

- Algoso, Campo de Víboras e Uva
- Caçarelhos e Angueira
- Argozelo
- Carção
- Matela
- Pinelo
- Santulhão
- Vale de Frades e Avelanoso
- Vilar Seco
- Vimioso
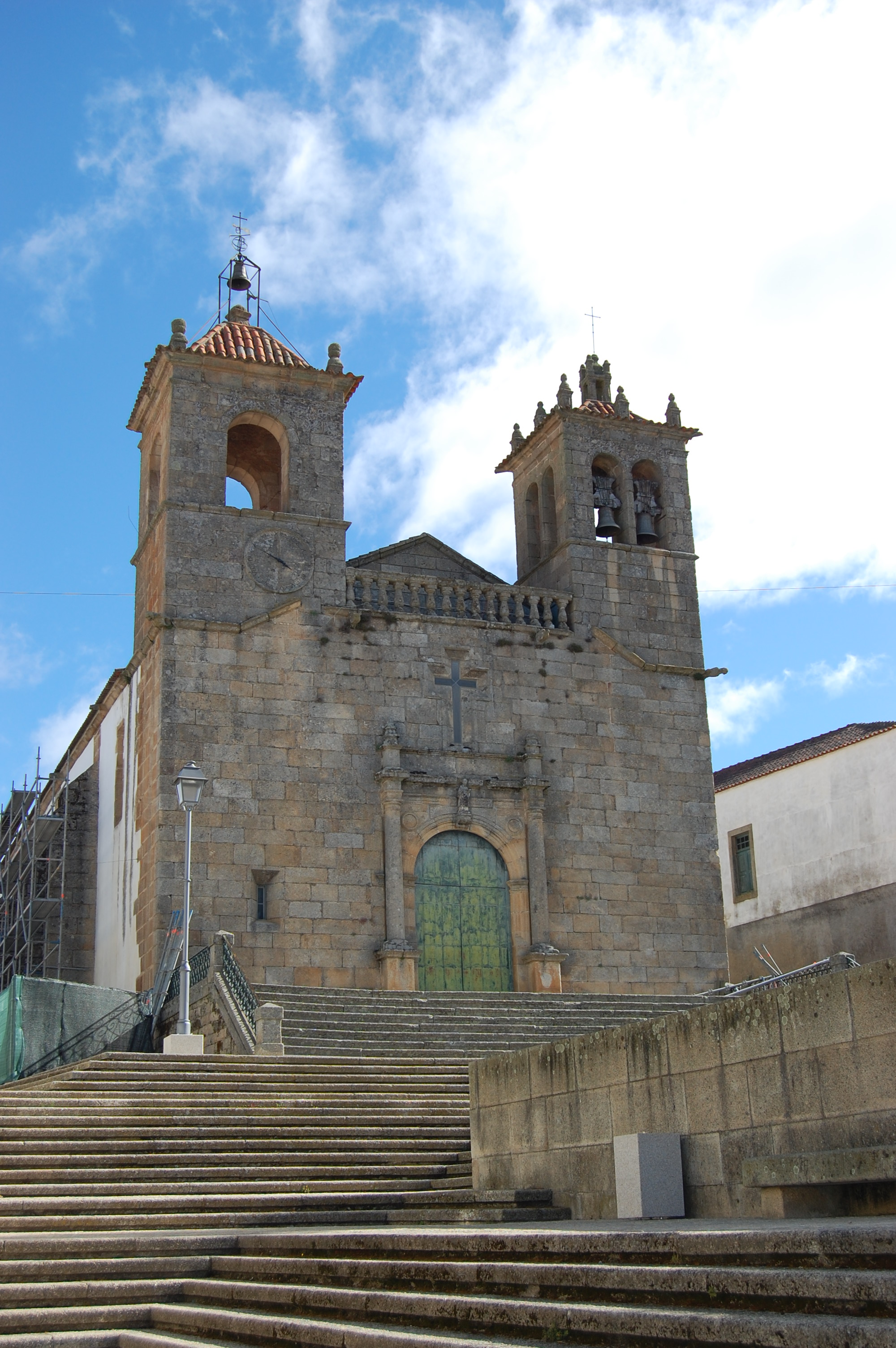
The Romanesque Matriz Church

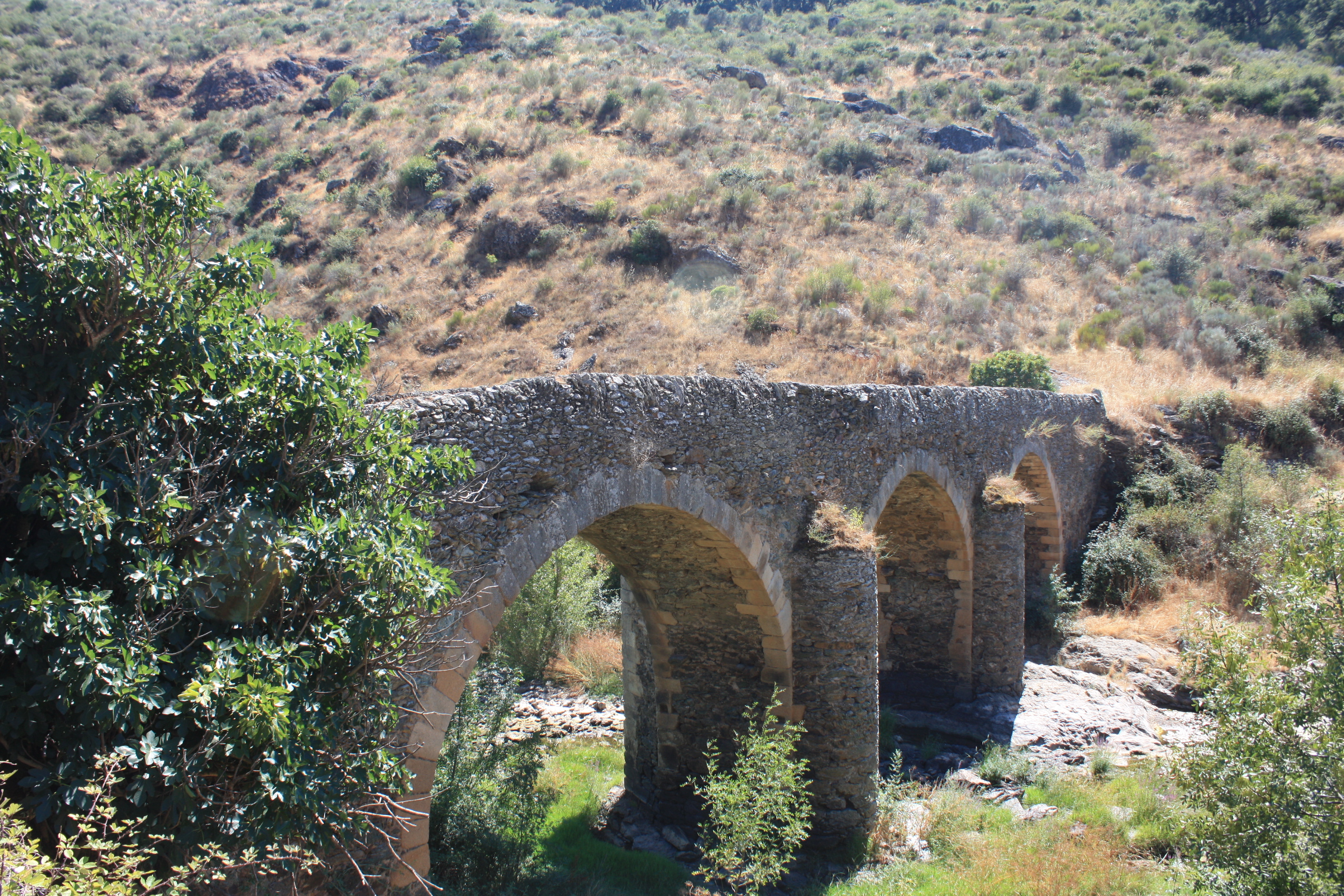
Medieval bridge of Algoso
