= Mangyu temple complex =

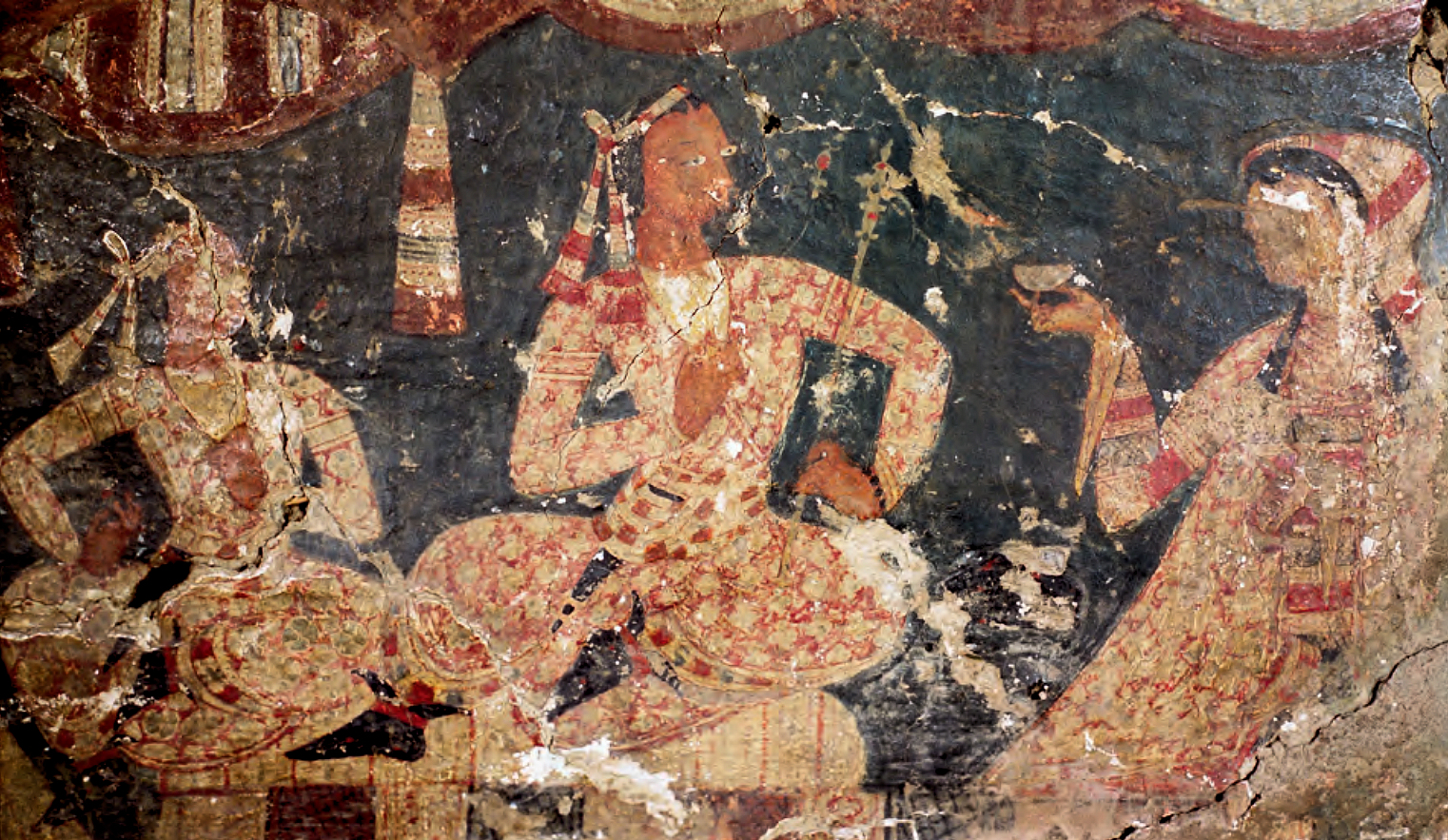
- Royal drinking scene at the entrance of the monastery at Mangyu, 16th century CE.

- Location in Ladakh Mangyu temple complex (Ladakh)

Religion
- Affiliation: Tibetan Buddhism

Location
- Location: Mangyu, Ladakh, India
- Coordinates: 34°14′0.41″N 77°3′15.07″E

Architecture
- Style: Tibetan Architecture
- Established: 12th/13th century

The Mangyu temple complex located in the village of Mangyu, Ladakh is one of the earliest in Ladakh, India. Believed to be contemporaneous to the temples at Alchi Monastery and Sumda Chun, the earliest structures are supposed to be dating to the late 12th/early 13th century but as per the oral history and local belief the temples were established by Lotsawa Rinchen Zangpo. Main temple complex comprise two early temples (Sakyamuni and Vairocana temples) situated adjacent to each other and two chapels, one each on either side of the temples, that house large images of two armed and four armed Maitreya. It lies 22 22 kilometres (14 mi) southwest of Alchi Monastery.

The Sakyamuni temple with a beautiful image of Sakyamuni on the North West wall is also known as Chenrezig Lakhang where as Vairocana temple with assemblage of sculptures on NW wall is known as Nangbar Nangzad and the chapels on either side are known as Chamba Lakhang. Another two important structures are early period painted chortens, one of them known as four image Chorten due to the four sculptures inside it. While the early structures are under the administration of Likir Monastery with one resident monk appointed by the monastery carrying out religious activities in the temples, a new temple built slightly above these early structures is under the administration of Matho Monastery.

Some of the wall paintings were lost and some were repainted in the past, especially those in the Vairocana temple. There are still some good quality authentic paintings at this site and the administration of Likir monastery is interested to conserve them without any repainting/retouching.

Video of Vairocana temple

== Access and amenities ==
Mangyu village is accessible by motorable roads and is about 70 km from Leh, a journey that will take about 2 hours by cabs. Important monasteries and sites like Basgo, Saspol, Alchi are all in this route with minor deviations. There are bus services from Leh to Mangyu twice a week. Mangyu is at a distance of about 15 km from Alchi monastery.

In 2013 there were three shops in the village with various stationery items that include water, bottled soft drinks, tea, noodles, biscuits etc. There is a good home stay, Mangyu guest house, with three rooms, two with attached toilets.

== Conservation ==
Architectural conservation of all the temples and chapels and conservation of paintings of Sakyamuni temple were carried out by the Architectural and Material Heritage divisions of the Delhi chapter of Indian National Trust for Art and Cultural Heritage (INTACH). The project carried out in five seasons was funded by Shinnyo-en.

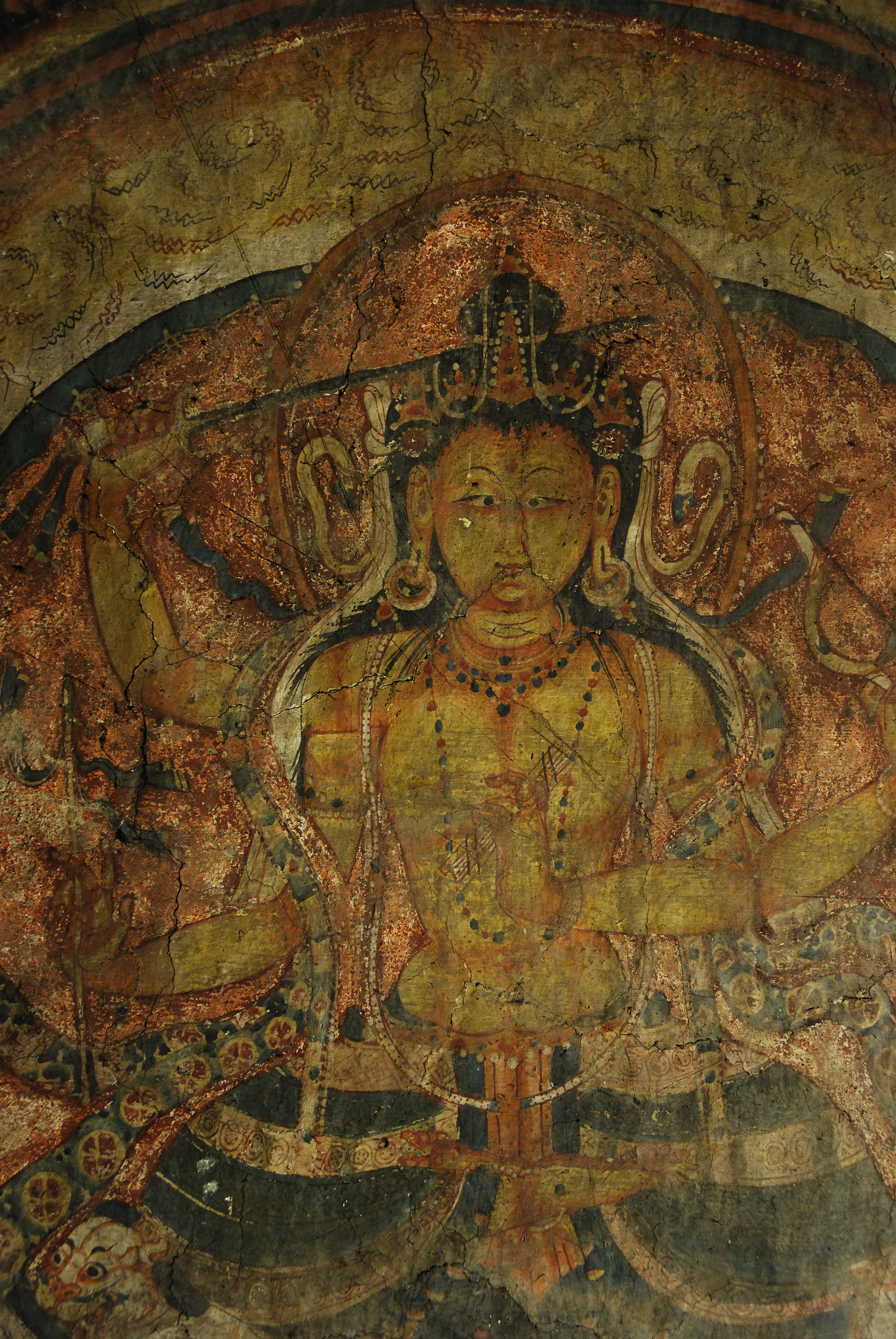
Manjusri, SW wall, Sakyamuni Temple Mangyu.

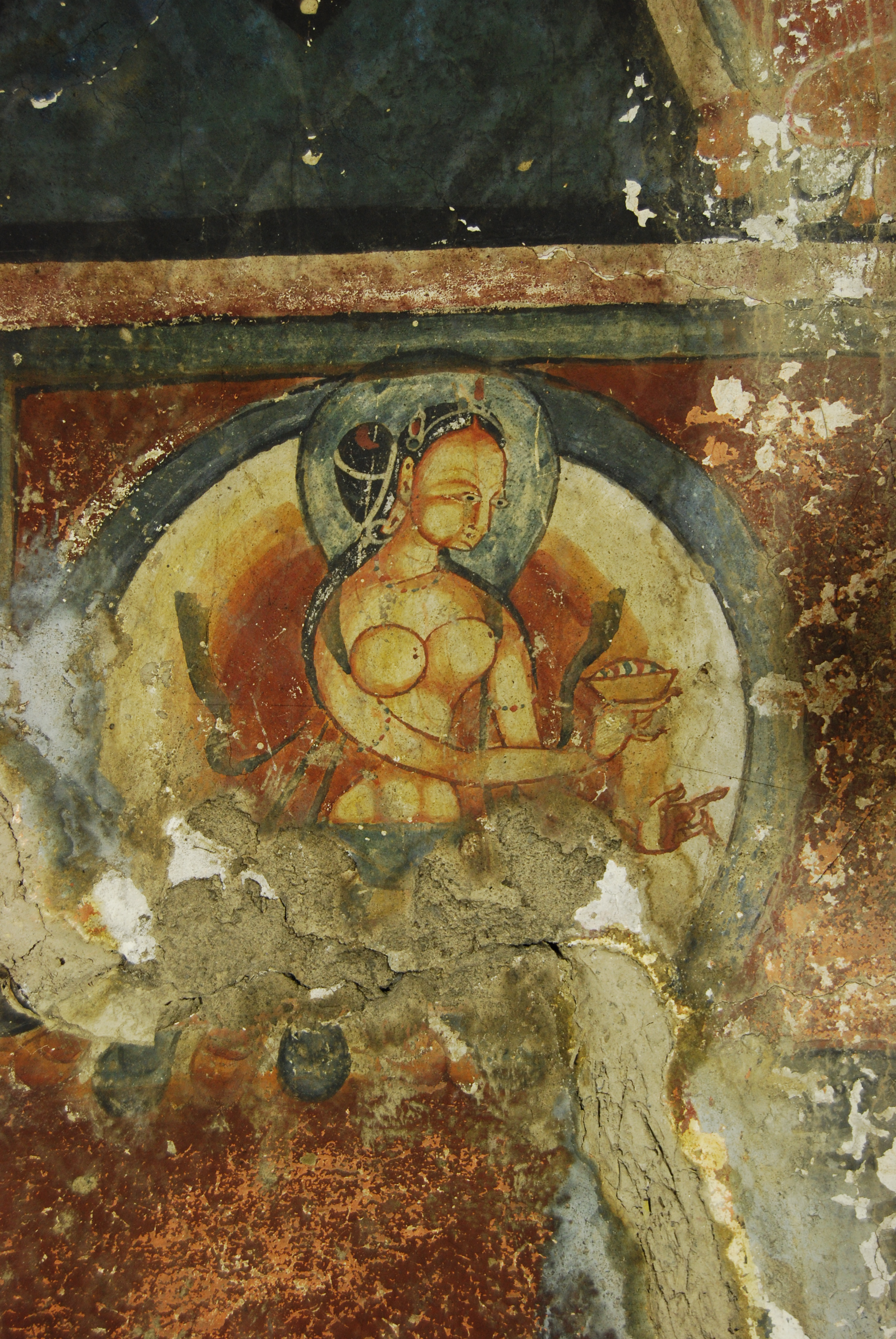
Female deity - Mangyu, Ladakh.

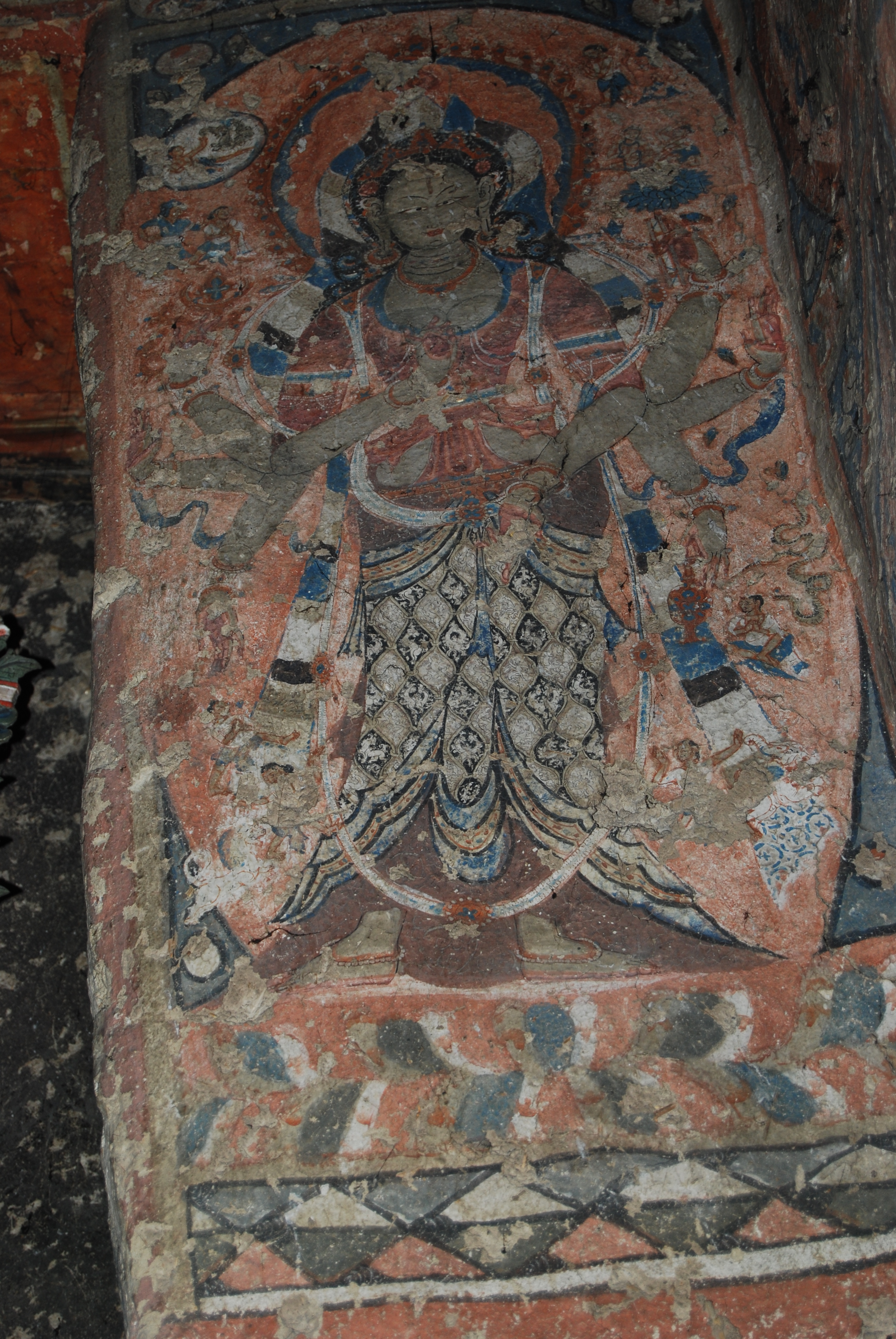
Wall painting, Four Image Chorten, Mangyu

== See also ==
- List of Buddhist monasteries in Ladakh
- Tourism in Ladakh
