= Giramangu =

Giramangu Gaira Mangue, Mangue, Mangyu
- Village
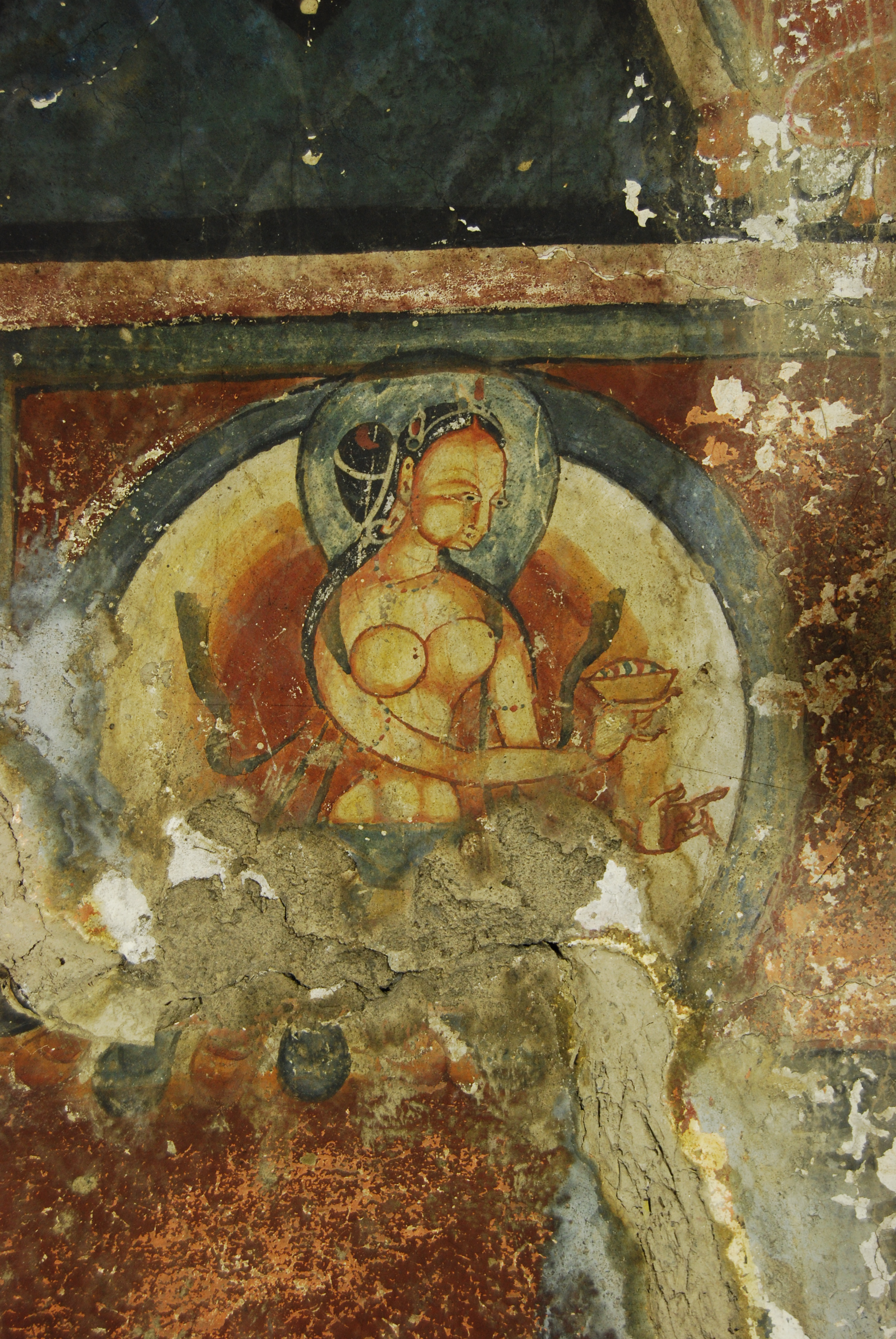
- A painting in the Mangyu temple complex

- Location in Ladakh, India Giramangu (India)
- Coordinates: 34.246047°N 77.080926°E
- Country: India
- Union Territory: Ladakh
- District: Sham
- Tehsil: Saspol

Population (2011)
  - Total: 407
- Time zone: UTC+5:30 (IST)
- Census code: 955

Giramangu, also known as Gaira Mangue or Mangyu, is a village in the Sham district of Ladakh, India. It is located in the Saspol tehsil. The Mangyu temple complex (Mangyu monastery) is located near this village.

== Demographics ==
According to the 2011 census of India, Giramangu has 67 households. The effective literacy rate (i.e. the literacy rate of population excluding children aged 6 and below) is 65.56%.

Demographics (2011 Census)
	Total	Male	Female
Population	407	206	201
Children aged below 6 years	47	26	21
Scheduled caste	0	0	0
Scheduled tribe	406	205	201
Literates	236	128	108
Workers (all)	207	106	101
Main workers (total)	126	99	27
Main workers: Cultivators	39	35	4
Main workers: Agricultural labourers	1	1	0
Main workers: Household industry workers	1	1	0
Main workers: Other	85	62	23
Marginal workers (total)	81	7	74
Marginal workers: Cultivators	73	2	71
Marginal workers: Agricultural labourers	4	4	0
Marginal workers: Household industry workers	1	0	1
Marginal workers: Others	3	1	2
Non-workers	200	100	100
