= Manjhi =

Manjhi may refer to:

- Manjhi - The Mountain Man, 2015 Indian biographical film about Dashrath Manjhi
- Manjhi (tribe), a tribe found in the Indian states of Madhya Pradesh and Bihar
- Manjhi (Vidhan Sabha constituency), assembly constituency in Saran district, Bihar, India
- Dashrath Manjhi, Indian labourer
- Jitan Ram Manjhi, Indian politician from Bihar
- An alternate name for the Majhwar caste of Uttar Pradesh, India

== See also ==
- Manji (disambiguation)
- Majhi (disambiguation)
