= Manz (surname) =

Manz is a surname. Notable people with the surname include:

- Beatrice Forbes Manz, American historian
- Cecilie Manz (born 1972), Danish industrial designer
- Daniel Manz (born 1987), German taekwondo practitioner
- Felix Manz (c. 1498–1527), Swiss Anabaptist
- Hans Peter Manz (born 1955), Austrian diplomat
- Jacob Manz (1837–1916), American engraver
- John R. Manz (born 1945), American Roman Catholic bishop
- Linda Manz (1961–2020), American actress
- Paul Manz (1919–2009), American composer
- Sebastian Manz (born 1986), German clarinettist
- Sümeyye Manz (born 1989), German taekwondo practitioner
- Wilhelm von Manz (1804–1867), Bavarian Lieutenant General and war minister
- Wolfgang Manz (born 1960), German pianist
