= Mangy Hill =

Coordinates: 52°00′27″N 177°31′13″E

Mangy Hill is a summit in Aleutians West Census Area, Alaska, in the United States. It is on the island of Kiska.

Mangy Hill was so named because the U.S. military needed a name to begin with the letter M in order to fit with their alphabetical naming system.
