= Mangi Dam, India =

Dam on Kanola River in Maharashtra, India

Mangi Dam
- Location within Maharashtra
- Official name: Mangi Dam D04311
- Location: Karmala
- Coordinates: 18.4646906°N 75.1784561°E
- Opening date: 1966
- Owners: Government of Maharashtra, India

Dam and spillways
- Type of dam: Earthfill
- Impounds: Kanola river
- Height: 22.95 m (75.3 ft)
- Length: 1,475 m (4,839 ft)

Reservoir
- Total capacity: 32,720 km^{3} (7,850 cu mi)

Mangi Dam, is an earthfill dam on Kanola river near Karmala, Solapur district in the state of Maharashtra in India.

== Specifications ==
The height of the dam above lowest foundation is 22.95 m (75.3 ft) while the length is 1,475 m (4,839 ft). The gross storage capacity is 32,720.00 km^{3} (7,849.95 cu mi).

== Purpose ==
- Irrigation

== See also ==
- Dams in Maharashtra
- List of reservoirs and dams in India
