= Mangi, Jalgaon district =

Village in Maharashtra

Mangi Mangi
- Village
- Location in Maharashtra, India Mangi (India)
- Coordinates: 21.103759°N 75.85109°E
- Country: India
- State: Maharashtra
- District: Jalgaon

Government
  - Body: Gram panchayat
- Elevation: 718 m (2,356 ft)

Population (2001)
  - Total: 500

Languages
  - Official: Marathi
- Time zone: UTC+5:30 (IST)
- PIN: 425501
- Telephone code: 02584
- ISO 3166 code: IN-MH
- Vehicle registration: MH19

Mangi is a small village approximately 20 km from Bhusawal in the Jalgaon district of Maharashtra, India. It is 8.1 km from Faizpur and 8.2 km from Savda.
