= Terra de Miranda =

Cultural region in northeastern Portugal

Mirandese: Tierra(s) de Miranda Portuguese: Terra(s) de Miranda
- Miranda Land(s)
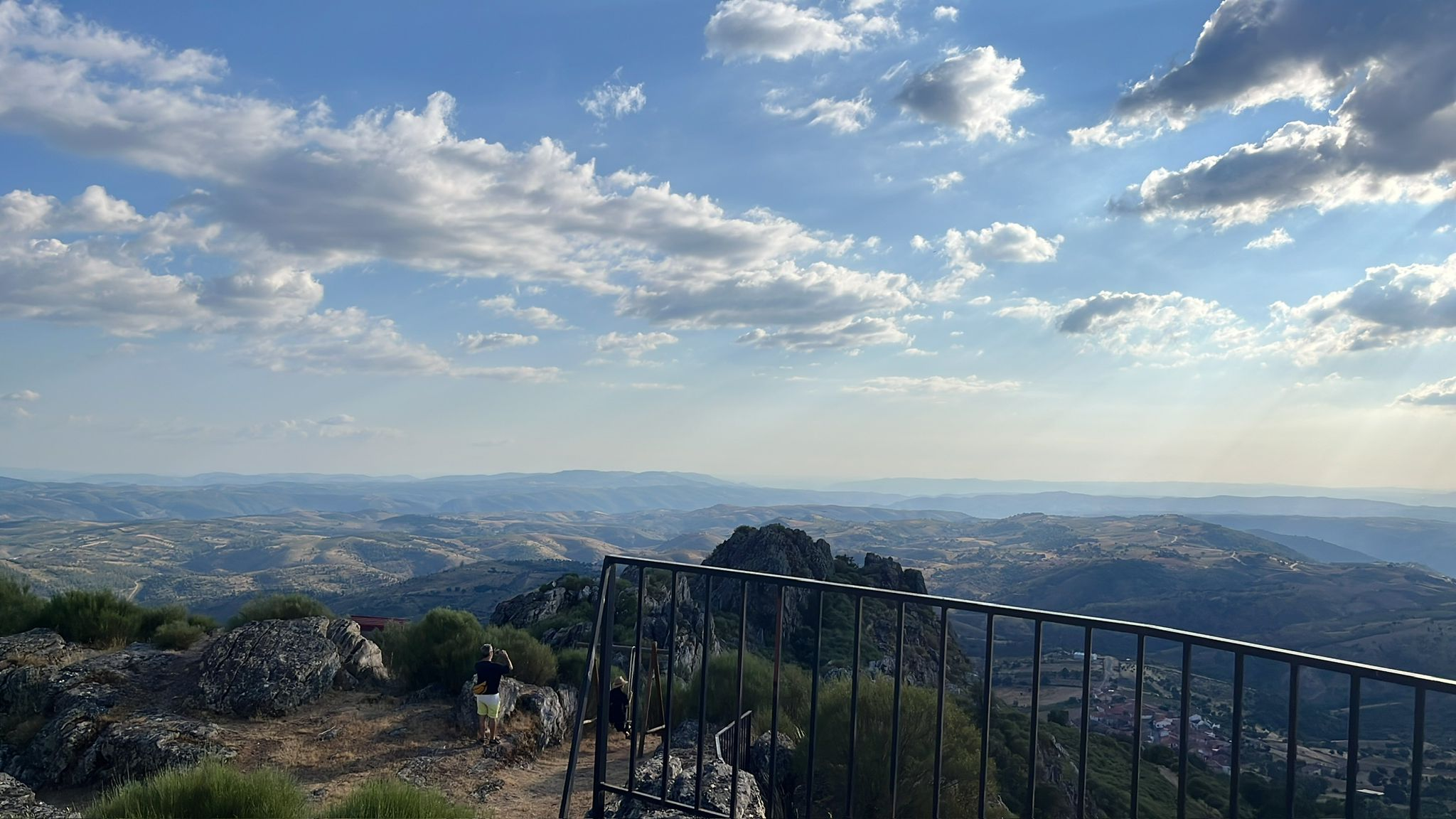
- View of Miranda, from atop a hill in Mogadouro

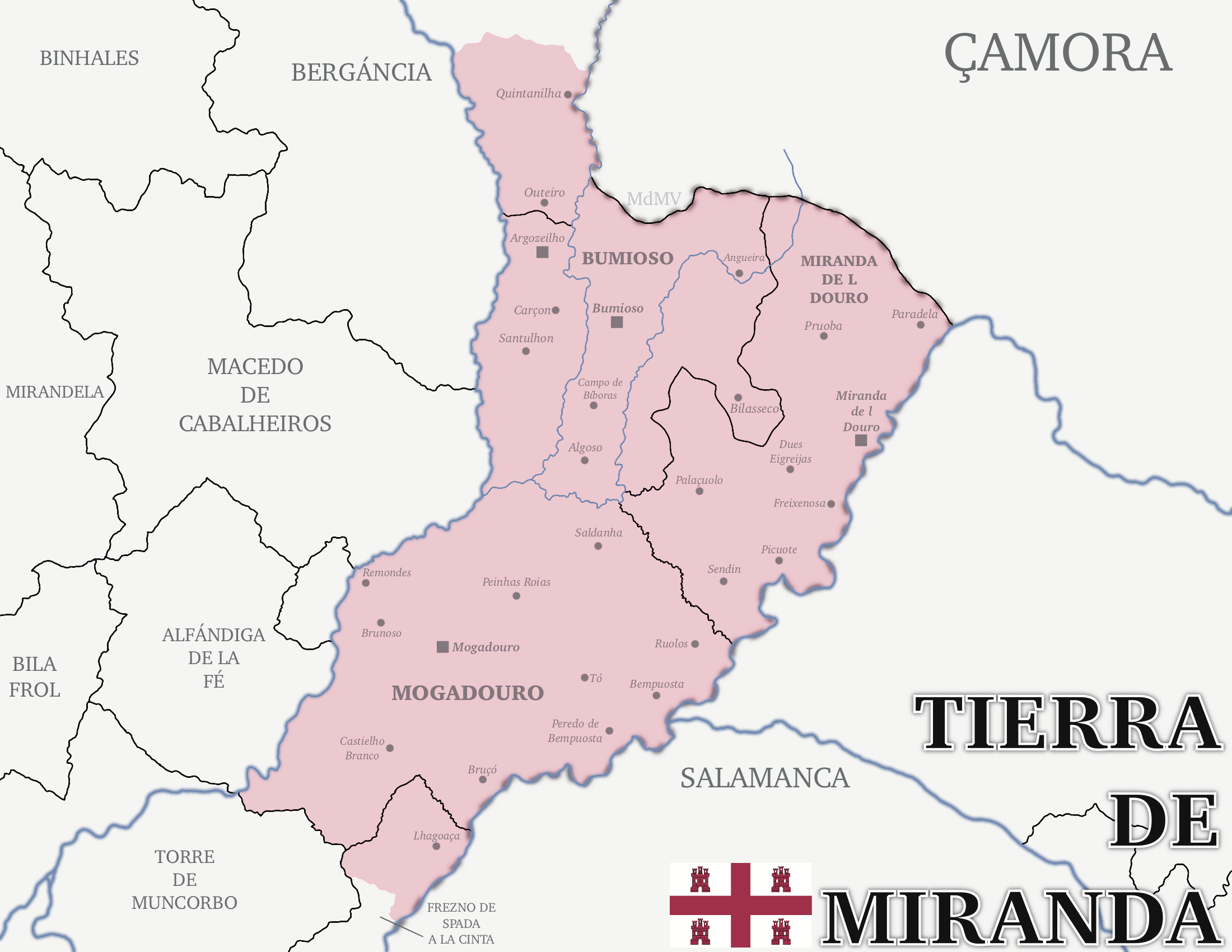
- A map of Tierra de Miranda, divided into official municipalities, with some settlements displayed
- Country: Portugal
- District: Bragança (Mirandese: Bergáncia)

Area
  - Total: 1,884.67 km^{2} (727.68 sq mi)

Population (2021)
  - Total: 19,835
  - Density: 10.524/km^{2} (27.258/sq mi)
- Demonym: mirandese

- People: Mirandese people (Mirandeses)
- Language: Mirandese (Mirandés)
- Country: (Land of) Miranda ((Tierra de) Miranda)

Tierra(s) de Miranda (Mirandese: [ˈtjera(s̺) ðə miˈɾãda]) or Terra(s) de Miranda (Portuguese: [ˈtɛʁɐ(ʒ) ðɨ miˈɾɐ̃dɐ]); lit. 'Land(s) of Miranda'), also known as the Praino Mirandés (in Mirandese) or Planalto Mirandês (in Portuguese), both meaning Mirandese Plateau, is a cultural and historical region in northeastern Portugal, centered around the city of Miranda de l Douro (Portuguese: Miranda do Douro) on the border with Spain, home to the Mirandese people.

== Etymology ==
The etymology of the toponym Miranda is still debated, though it is a common place name across Portugal, Spain, and their former colonial empires. The Latin mirandus means "worthy of admiration" (whence the given name "Miranda"), and when used in a place name seems to indicate an area at or around a vantage point, such as a watchtower or a belvedere.

== Geography ==
=== Boundaries ===
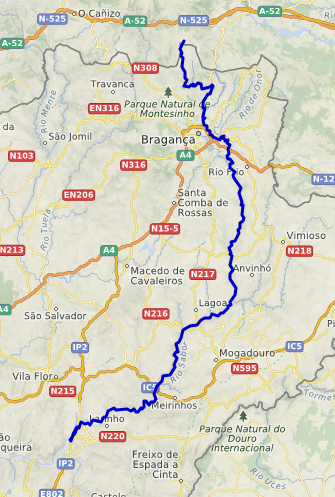
The Sabor River historically served as a geographic boundary between the Portuguese and Leonese regions of Trás-os-Montes.

Broadly speaking, the Tierra de Miranda comprises the area between the Sabor and Douro rivers, more specifically, the current municipalities of Miranda de l Douro and Bumioso, most of Mogadouro, and small parts of Bergáncia and Frezno de Spada a la Cinta. These regions were historically part of the Diocese of Astorga, and during the Reconquista were settled by people of the Kingdom of Leon, speakers of Old Leonese (which eventually evolved into Mirandese and other Asturleonese dialects).

There are two definitions of the borders of Miranda: one which follows the historically accurate borders of the region, and another which follows the current borders of the 3 main municipalities that compose it. The historically accurate definition includes parts of the municipalities of Bergáncia and Frezno de Spada a la Cinta, yet, excludes parts of Mogadouro; and the “modern” definition includes parts of Mogadouro which are not historically regarded as Mirandese, but does not include any territory of municipalities besides Miranda de l Douro, Bumioso and the aforementioned Mogadouro. Even if the historical borders are regarded as more correct by many, for modern convenience, Miranda is regarded as the territory that encompasses the 3 main municipalities in most political contexts, such as by the Mobimiento Cultural de la Tierra de Miranda (MCTM) or the Terra de Miranda Notícias newspaper.

The parishes that compose Miranda are the following:

Municipality of Miranda de l Douro:

- Constantim e Cicouro (Mirandese: Custantin i Cicuiro)
- Duas Igrejas (Mirandese: Dues Eigreijas)
- Genísio (Mirandese: Zenízio)
- Ifanes e Paradela (Mirandese: Infainç i Paradela)
- Malhadas
- Miranda do Douro (Mirandese: Miranda de l Douro)
- Palaçoulo (Mirandese: Palaçuolo)
- Picote (Mirandese: Picuote)
- Póvoa (Mirandese: Pruoba)
- São Martinho de Angueira (Mirandese: San Martino)
- Sendim e Atenor (Mirandese: Sendin i Atanor)
- Silva e Águas Vivas (Mirandese: Silba i Augas Bibas)
- Vila Chã de Braciosa (Mirandese: Bila Chana de Barceosa)

Municipality of Bumioso:

- Algoso, Campo de Víboras e Uva (Mirandese: Algoso, Campo de Bíboras i Uba)
- Argozelo (Mirandese: Argozeilho)
- Caçarelhos e Angueira (Mirandese: Caçareilhos i Angueira)
- Carção (Mirandese: Carçon)
- Matela
- Pinelo
- Santulhão (Mirandese: Santulhon)
- Vale de Frades e Avelanoso (Mirandese: Bal de Frailes i Abelhanoso)
- Vilar Seco (Mirandese: Bilasseco)
- Vimioso (Mirandese: Bumioso)

Municipality of Mogadouro:

- Azinhoso
- Bemposta (Mirandese: Bempuosta)
- Bruçó
- Brunhoso (Mirandese: Brunoso)
- Brunozinho, Castanheira e Sanhoane (Mirandese: Bernhusino, Castanheira i Sanhoane)
- Castelo Branco (Mirandese: Castielho Branco)
- Meirinhos (Mirandese: Meirinos)
- Mogadouro, Valverde, Vale de Porco e Vilar de Rei (Mirandese: Mogadouro, Balberde, Bal de Porco i Bilar de Rei)
- Paradela
- Penas Róias (Mirandese: Peinhas Róias)
- Peredo de Bemposta (Mirandese: Peredo de Bempuosta)
- Remondes e Soutelo (Mirandese: Remondes i Soutelo)
- Saldanha
- São Martinho do Peso (Mirandese: San Martino de l Peso)
- Tó
- Travanca (Mirandese: Trabanca)
- Urrós (Mirandese: Ruolos)
- Vale da Madre (Mirandese: Bal de la Madre)
- Vila de Ala (Mirandese: Bila d’Ala)
- Vilarinho dos Galegos e Ventozelo (Mirandese: Bilarico de ls Galhegos i Bentozeilho)

Parishes which are sometimes, but not always included:

Municipality of Bragança:

- Outeiro
- Quintanilha
- Rio Frio e Milhão (Mirandese: Riu Friu i Milhon)

Municipality of Mogadouro:

- Castro Vicente (Mirandese: Castro Bicente)

Municipality of Frezno de Spada a la Cinta:

- Lagoaça e Fornos (Mirandese: Lhagoaça i Fornos)

== Culture ==
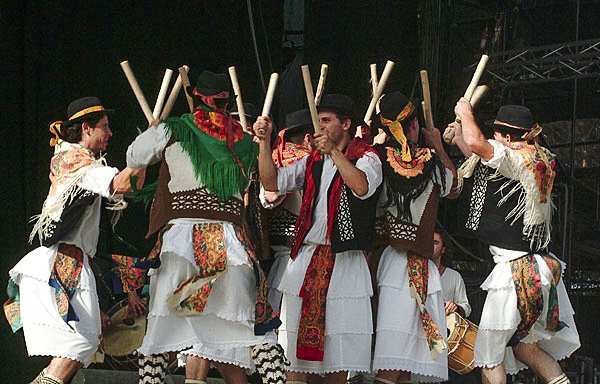
Pauliteiros in Festa do Avante! of 2005.

Among the best-known cultural features of the area are the Mirandese language, the Pauliteiros, the pagan rituals practiced from Christmas to Easter, the farandulo, and bagpipe music.

== See also ==
- Miranda do Douro
