= Anstituto de la Lhéngua Mirandesa =

Mirandese Language institute in Portugal

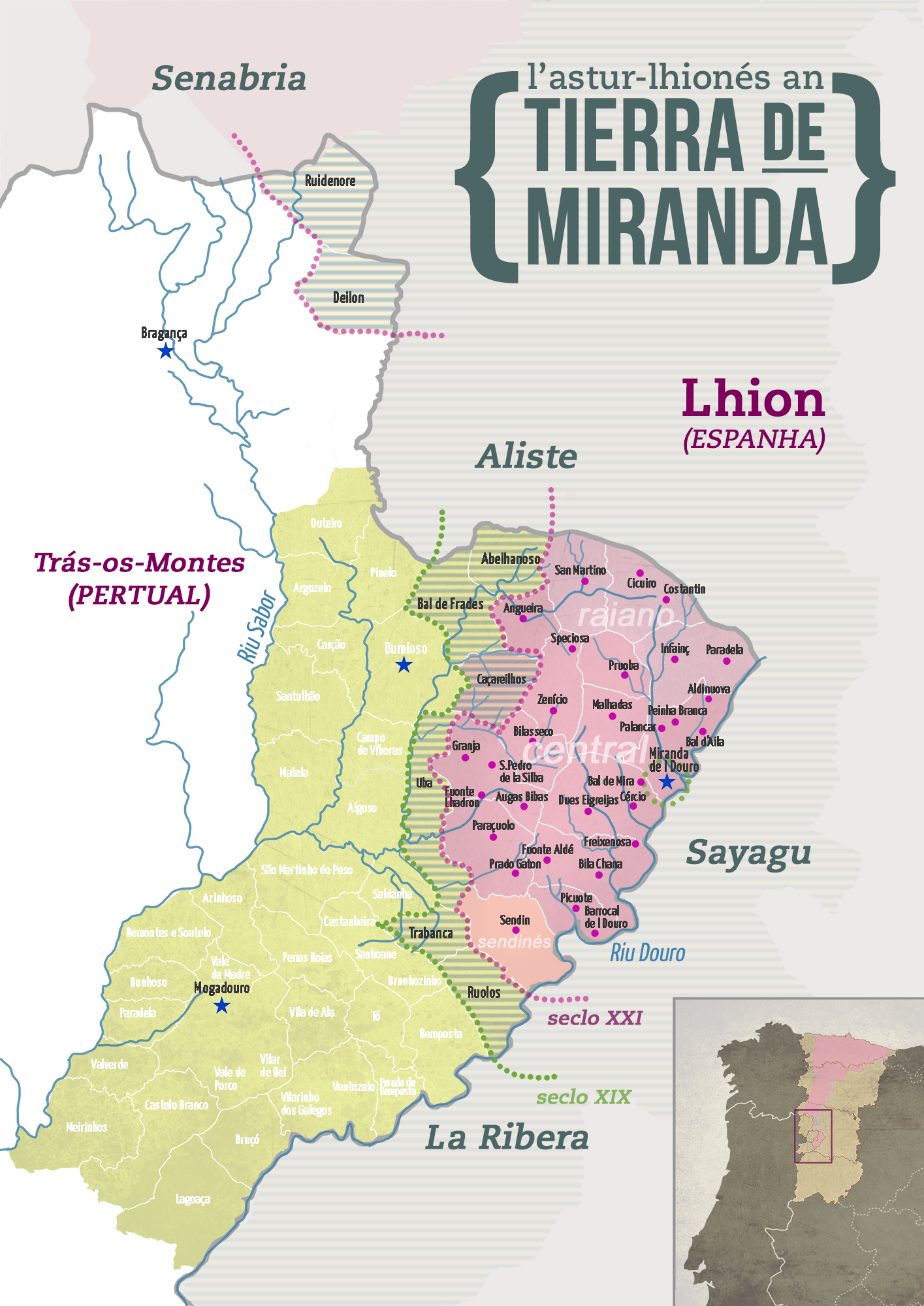
Distribution of the Mirandese language in Terra de Miranda

The Institute of the Mirandese Language (Mirandese: Anstituto de la Lhéngua Mirandesa) is the institution responsible for the representation, research, promotion, codification and distribution of the Mirandese language. Its headquarters is in the northern Portuguese town of Miranda do Douro. It arose from the need for the existence of an entity to protect and promote the use of Mirandese. The decision to form the institute came about from a meeting in September 2000, in Miranda do Douro, where a number of persons interested in the language met, also passing the resolution to establish Mirandese under the European Charter for Regional or Minority Languages.
