= Rock shelter of Solhapa =

The Rock shelter of Solhapa (Portuguese: Abrigo rupestre da Solhapa) is a Paleolithic archaeological site in Duas Igrejas, Miranda do Douro, Portugal.

On the cover of the grotto is an engraving, similar to others found in Spain and France, and which have been interpreted as representing a sorcerer. It is a representation of a human figure, whose head, in a trapezoidal configuration, ends in points resembling a pair of branches. At the basin level, two lines appear to represent a tail and an erect phallus.

The remaining sculptures can be found either on the interior walls of the cave or on the floor. The iconographic diversity is great with dimples, perpendicular features, semicircles and straight and interconnected bars, almost labyrinthine. There is also an element in the form of a snake and human figures, chronologically bounded between the end of the Neolithic period and the beginning of the Chalcolithic / Bronze Age.
