= Silva e Águas Vivas =

- Civil parish
- Interactive map of Silva e Águas Vivas
- Country: Portugal
- Region: Norte
- Intermunic. comm.: Terras de Trás-os-Montes
- District: Bragança
- Municipality: Miranda do Douro

Area
  - Total: 40.61 km^{2} (15.68 sq mi)

Population (2011)
  - Total: 400
  - Density: 9.8/km^{2} (26/sq mi)
- Time zone: UTC+00:00 (WET)
  - Summer (DST): UTC+01:00 (WEST)

Silva e Águas Vivas (Portuguese pronunciation: [ˈsiɫ.vɐ ˈi ˈa.ɣwɐʒ ˈvi.vɐʃ]) (Mirandese: Silba i Augas Bibas, Mirandese pronunciation: [ˈsiɫ.βaˈi ˈaw.ɣaz̺ ˈbi.βas̺]) is a civil parish in the municipality of Miranda do Douro, Portugal. It was formed in 2013 by the merger of the former parishes Silva and Águas Vivas. The population in 2011 was 400, in an area of 40.61 km².
