= Palaçoulo =

- Civil parish
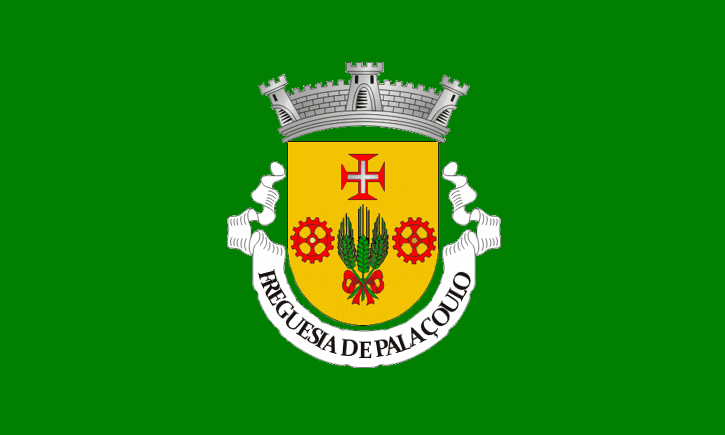
- Flag
- Interactive map of Palaçoulo
- Country: Portugal
- Region: Norte
- Intermunic. comm.: Terras de Trás-os-Montes
- District: Bragança
- Municipality: Miranda do Douro

Area
  - Total: 50.14 km^{2} (19.36 sq mi)

Population (2011)
  - Total: 554
  - Density: 11.0/km^{2} (28.6/sq mi)
- Time zone: UTC+00:00 (WET)
  - Summer (DST): UTC+01:00 (WEST)

Palaçoulo (Portuguese pronunciation: [pɐ.lɐˈso(w).lu]) (Mirandese: Palaçuolo, Mirandese pronunciation: [pa.laˈs̻wo.lʊ]) is a civil parish in the municipality of Miranda do Douro, Portugal.

The population in 2011 was 325, in an area of 44.70 km².

== Population ==
Population of the freguesia of Palaçoulo
1864	1878	1890	1900	1911	1920	1930	1940	1950	1960	1970	1981	1991	2001	2011
700	740	659	810	894	885	975	978	993	1 034	725	806	780	678	554
