= São Martinho de Angueira =

- Civil parish
- Location in Portugal
- Coordinates: 41°38′19″N 6°20′58″W
- Country: Portugal
- Region: Norte
- Intermunic. comm.: Terras de Trás-os-Montes
- District: Bragança
- Municipality: Miranda do Douro

Area
  - Total: 37.00 km^{2} (14.29 sq mi)

Population (2011)
  - Total: 307
  - Density: 8.30/km^{2} (21.5/sq mi)
- Time zone: UTC+00:00 (WET)
  - Summer (DST): UTC+01:00 (WEST)

São Martinho de Angueira (Portuguese pronunciation: [ˈsɐ̃w̃ mɐɾˈti.ɲu ˈdɨ ɐ̃ˈɡɐj.ɾɐ]) (Mirandese: San Martino, Mirandese pronunciation: [s̺a.maɾˈti.nʊ]) is a civil parish in the municipality of Miranda do Douro, Portugal.

The population in 2011 was 307, in an area of 37.00 km².

== Population ==
Population of the freguesia of São Martinho de Angueira
1864	1878	1890	1900	1911	1920	1930	1940	1950	1960	1970	1981	1991	2001	2011
537	619	719	728	796	770	853	946	1 009	1 029	712	559	439	359	307
