= Sabor River =

River in northern Portugal

Coordinates: 41°10′35″N 7°06′41″W

Sabor River (Rio Sabor in Portuguese, Riu Sabor in Mirandese) is a river that rises in Spain and enters Portugal in the Natural Park of Montesinho, in the northeast of the country. It is a tributary of the right bank of the Douro River, passing near the city of Bragança from where it receives the waterbody of the River Fervença, going to empty close to the Torre de Moncorvo downstream of the Pocinho Dam, in the village of Foz do Sabor. The Sabor River basin is a large basin (3,170 km2) in the northeast of Portugal and used mostly for agroforestry, it is sometimes considered the western geographic boundary of the so-called "Terra de Miranda".
