= Genísio =

Coordinates: 41.5660888°N 6.3815982°W

- Civil parish
- Interactive map of Genísio
- Country: Portugal
- Region: Norte
- Intermunic. comm.: Terras de Trás-os-Montes
- District: Bragança
- Municipality: Miranda do Douro

Area
  - Total: 29.82 km^{2} (11.51 sq mi)

Population (2011)
  - Total: 186
  - Density: 6.24/km^{2} (16.2/sq mi)
- Time zone: UTC+00:00 (WET)
  - Summer (DST): UTC+01:00 (WEST)

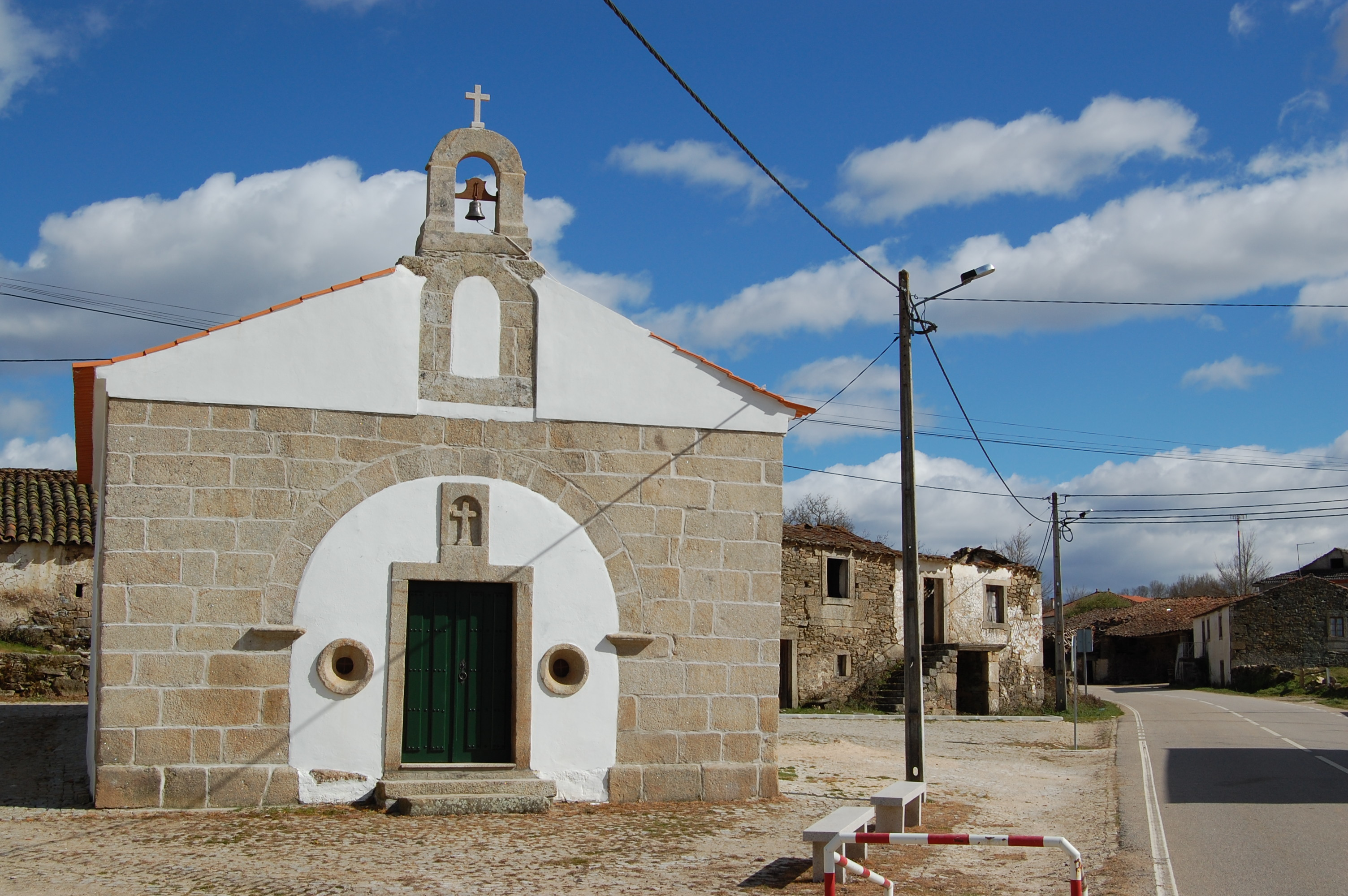
Genísio

Genísio (Portuguese pronunciation: [ʒɨˈni.zju]) (Mirandese: Zenízio, Mirandese pronunciation: [z̻əˈni.z̻jʊ]) is a civil parish in the municipality of Miranda do Douro, Portugal.

The population in 2011 was 186, in an area of 29.82 km².

== Population ==
Population of the parish of Genísio
1864	1878	1890	1900	1911	1920	1930	1940	1950	1960	1970	1981	1991	2001	2011
408	434	462	523	583	565	596	684	705	714	519	380	284	233	186
