= Mirandés =

Mirandés may refer to:

- Mirandese language, a language spoken in a small area of northeastern Portugal.
- The CD Mirandés, a Spanish football team.
- The citizens of Miranda de Ebro, a town in Spain.
