= Vila Chã de Braciosa =

- Civil parish
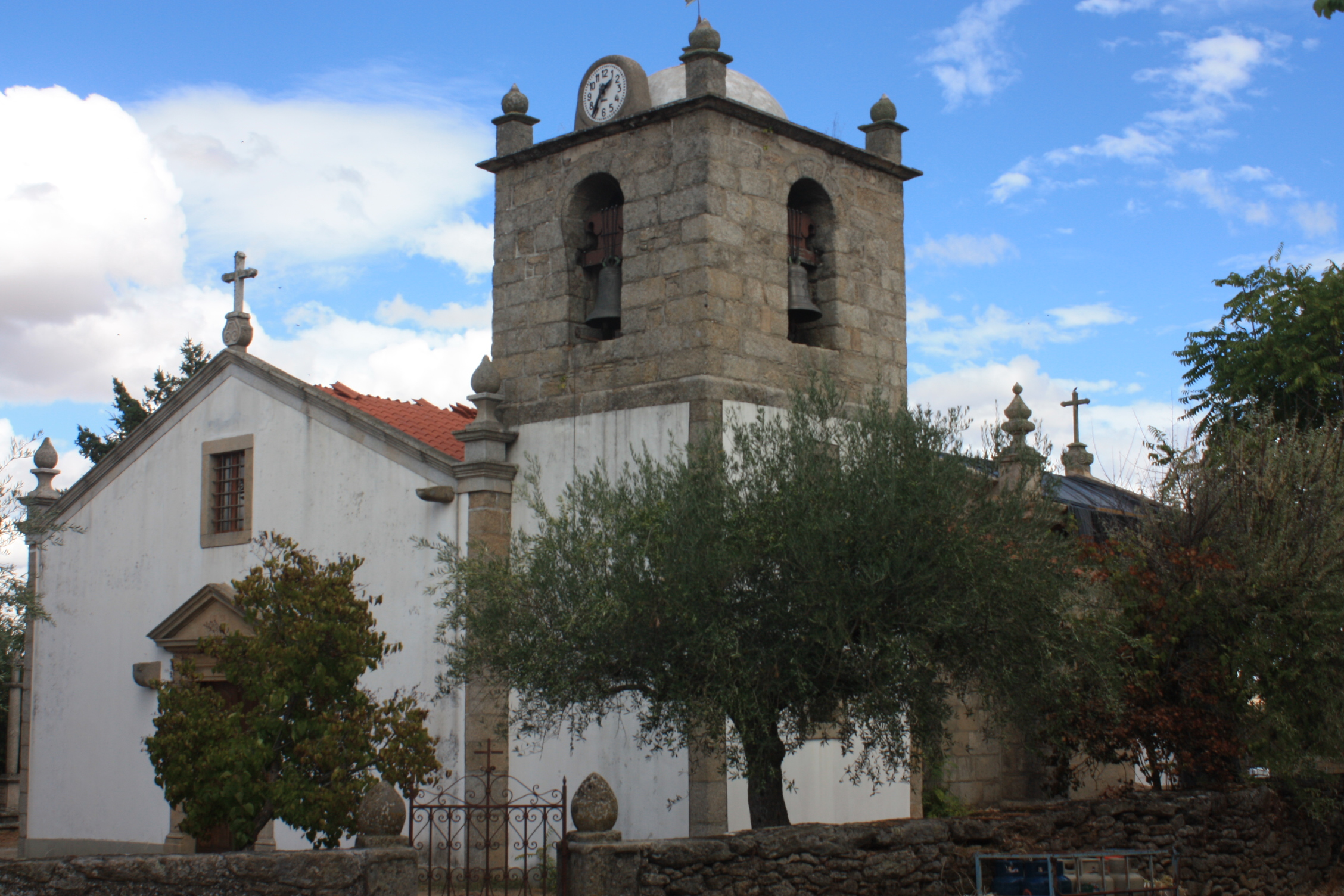

- Location in Portugal
- Coordinates: 41.428°N 6.345°W
- Country: Portugal
- Region: Norte
- Intermunic. comm.: Terras de Trás-os-Montes
- District: Bragança
- Municipality: Miranda do Douro

Area
  - Total: 42.94 km^{2} (16.58 sq mi)

Population (2011)
  - Total: 327
  - Density: 7.62/km^{2} (19.7/sq mi)
- Time zone: UTC+00:00 (WET)
  - Summer (DST): UTC+01:00 (WEST)

Vila Chã de Braciosa (Portuguese pronunciation: [ˈvi.lɐ ˈʃɐ̃ ˈðɨ bɾɐˈsjɔ.zɐ]) (Mirandese: Bila Chana de Barciosa, Mirandese pronunciation: [ˈbi.la ˈt͡ʃa.na ˈðə baɾ.s̻iˈo.z̺a]) is a parish in the municipality of Miranda do Douro, Portugal, which is located 15 kilometres south of Miranda do Douro proper, directly on the Portugal-Spain border. The population in 2011 was 327, in an area of 42.94 km². It consists of the villages Vila Chã, Freixiosa and Fonte de Aldeia. Fonte de Aldeia was first recorded in the Torre do Tombo register in 1528.

== History and traditions ==
Fonte de Aldeia was home to a wealthy religious order, which also had possessions in neighbouring Castile. Each friar offered a certain quantity of cereals, which was deposited in a barn (that still exists) to serve as a loan to families in need. In addition to the twelve annual Holy Masses which are still held today in memorial of the souls of the dead friars, there is also one single grand church service with a large number of priests for the same purpose.
