= Malhadas =

- Civil parish
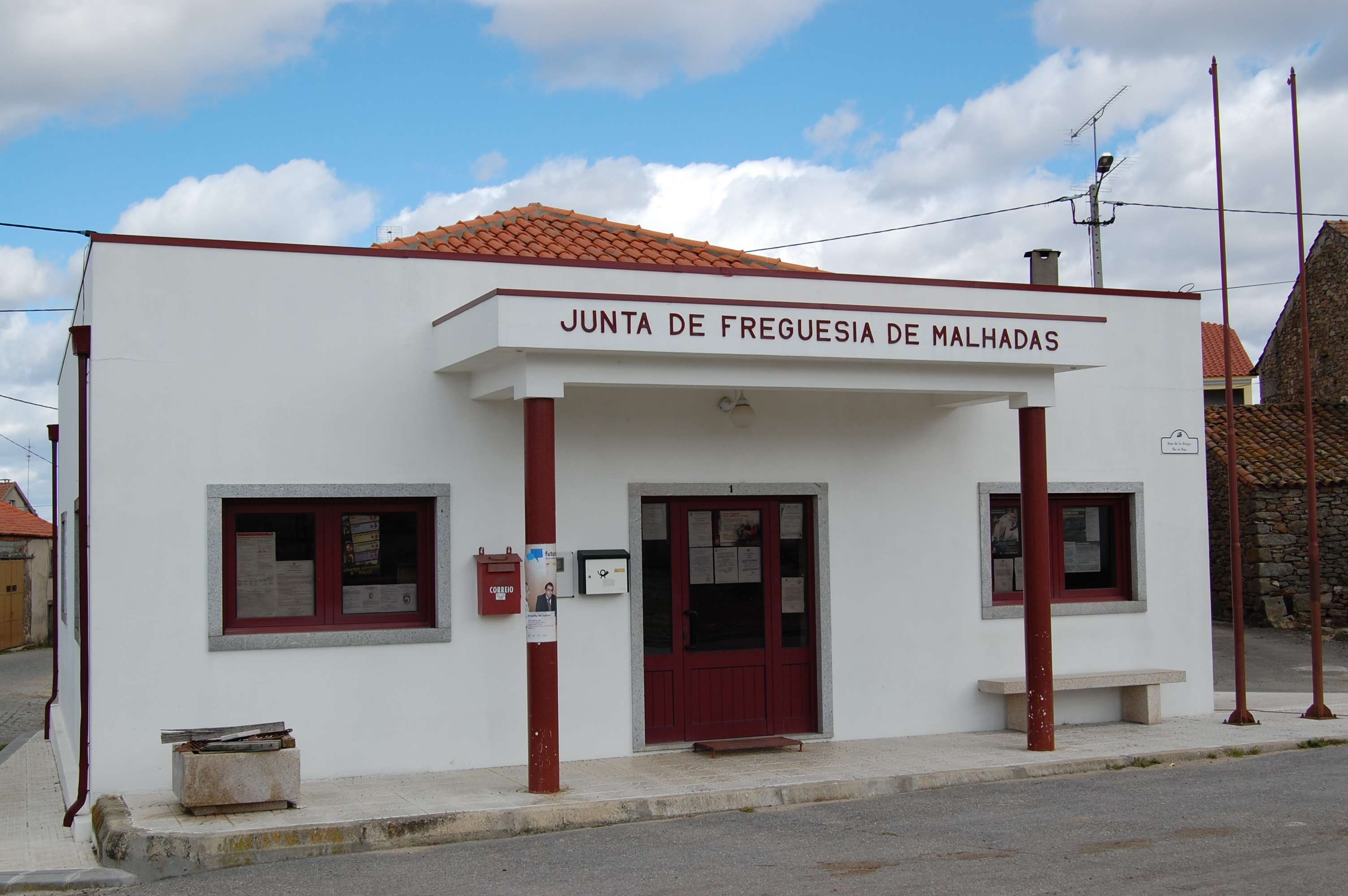
- Junta de freguesia of Malhadas in 2007
- Interactive map of Malhadas
- Country: Portugal
- Region: Norte
- Intermunic. comm.: Terras de Trás-os-Montes
- District: Bragança
- Municipality: Miranda do Douro

Area
  - Total: 27.67 km^{2} (10.68 sq mi)

Population (2021)
  - Total: 275
  - Density: 9.94/km^{2} (25.7/sq mi)
- Time zone: UTC+00:00 (WET)
  - Summer (DST): UTC+01:00 (WEST)

Malhadas (Portuguese pronunciation: [mɐˈʎa.ðɐʃ], Mirandese pronunciation: [maˈʎa.ðas̺]) is a civil parish in the municipality of Miranda do Douro, Portugal.

The population in 2021 was 275, in an area of 27.67 km².

== Population ==
Population of the freguesia of Malhadas
1864	1878	1890	1900	1911	1920	1930	1940	1950	1960	1970	1981	1991	2001	2011	2021
381	360	376	404	491	482	447	528	589	547	471	497	405	399	344	275

== Notable people ==
- Domingos Raposo
- Ricardo Ribas
- Anabela
