= Miranda do Douro (parish) =

- Civil parish
- Location in Portugal
- Coordinates: 41°29′45″N 6°16′26″W
- Country: Portugal
- Region: Norte
- Intermunic. comm.: Terras de Trás-os-Montes
- District: Bragança
- Municipality: Miranda do Douro

Area
  - Total: 37.48 km^{2} (14.47 sq mi)

Population (2011)
  - Total: 2,254
  - Density: 60/km^{2} (160/sq mi)
- Time zone: UTC+00:00 (WET)
  - Summer (DST): UTC+01:00 (WEST)

Miranda do Douro is a civil parish in the municipality of Miranda do Douro, Portugal.

The population in 2011 was 2254, in an area of 37.48 km².

== Population ==
Population of the freguesia of Miranda do Douro
1864	1878	1890	1900	1911	1920	1930	1940	1950	1960	1970	1981	1991	2001	2011
914	966	988	982	1 004	930	1 064	1 290	1 331	5 867	1 746	1 793	1 950	2 127	2 254
