= Póvoa (Miranda do Douro) =

- Civil parish
- Location in Portugal
- Coordinates: 41°34′15″N 6°18′55″W
- Country: Portugal
- Region: Norte
- Intermunic. comm.: Terras de Trás-os-Montes
- District: Bragança
- Municipality: Miranda do Douro

Area
  - Total: 22.42 km^{2} (8.66 sq mi)

Population (2011)
  - Total: 208
  - Density: 9.28/km^{2} (24.0/sq mi)
- Time zone: UTC+00:00 (WET)
  - Summer (DST): UTC+01:00 (WEST)

Póvoa (Portuguese pronunciation: [ˈpɔ.vwɐ]) (Mirandese: Pruoba, Mirandese pronunciation: [ˈpɾwo.βa]) is a civil parish in the municipality of Miranda do Douro, Portugal.

The population in 2011 was 208, in an area of 22.42 km².

== Population ==
Population of the freguesia of Póvoa
1864	1878	1890	1900	1911	1920	1930	1940	1950	1960	1970	1981	1991	2001	2011
329	361	386	405	457	439	463	464	490	494	382	372	317	243	208
