= Rio de Fornos =

Village in Trás-os-Montes, Portugal

Coordinates: 41.8523°N 7.0146°W

Rio de Fornos is a village near Vinhais, in the district of Bragança, province of Trás-os-Montes, in the North of Portugal.

== History ==
Literal translation into English is "River of Ovens", as there is a river that runs through this village that originates in the mountains. The name comes from the fact that ovens used to be made out of clay that came from this river. Clays sintered in fire were the first ceramic.

The Inquirições of 1258 referred to Rio de Fornos being governed by the church of S. Pedro de Rio de Fornos, not parochial but by the possession of an eighth of half the town of Zido. This land was a donation that had been made in time of D. Afonso II who reigned from 1211 to 1222.

In 1796, Rio de Fornos was governed by the parish of Our Lady of Expectação, with cure appointed by the County (freguesia) Paçó and recorded on that date, 35 fogos with 133 inhabitants, with 58 men and 75 women. Today it has more than 60 fogos.

== Population ==
At 2011 Rio de Fornos estimated population was 85.
