= Duas Igrejas (Miranda do Douro) =

Coordinates: 41.473°N 6.357°W

- Civil parish
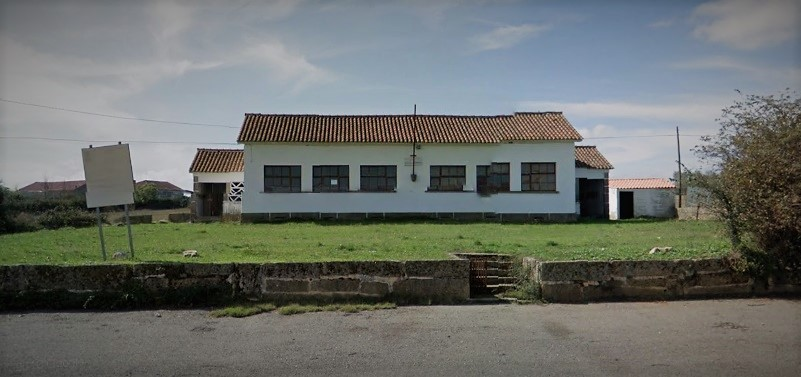
- Old primary school
- Interactive map of Duas Igrejas
- Country: Portugal
- Region: Norte
- Intermunic. comm.: Terras de Trás-os-Montes
- District: Bragança
- Municipality: Miranda do Douro

Area
  - Total: 49.26 km^{2} (19.02 sq mi)

Population (2011)
  - Total: 599
  - Density: 12.2/km^{2} (31.5/sq mi)
- Time zone: UTC+00:00 (WET)
  - Summer (DST): UTC+01:00 (WEST)

Duas Igrejas (Portuguese pronunciation: [ˈdu.ɐʃ iˈɡɾɐj.ʒɐʃ]) (Mirandese: Dues Eigreijas, Mirandese pronunciation: [ˈdu(.ə)s̺ ejˈɡɾej.ʒas̺]) is a civil parish in the municipality of Miranda do Douro, Portugal.

The population in 2011 was 599, in an area of 49.26 km².

== Population ==
Population of the freguesia of Duas Igrejas
1864	1878	1890	1900	1911	1920	1930	1940	1950	1960	1970	1981	1991	2001	2011
778	891	952	1 009	1 109	1 079	1 084	1 334	1 499	1 542	1 138	990	860	744	599
