= Miranda do Douro =

- Municipality
- City of Miranda do Douro
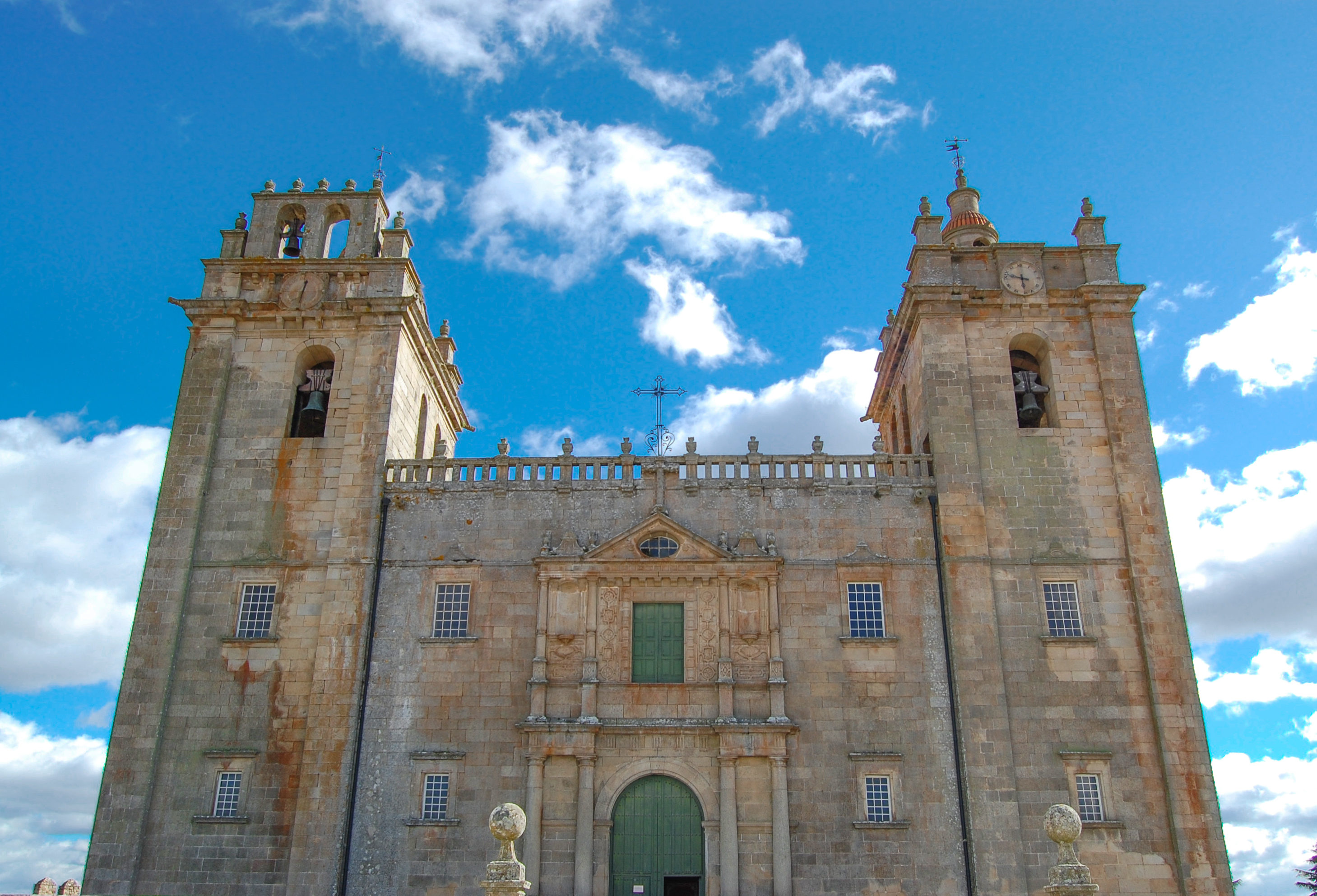
- Cathedral of Miranda do Douro

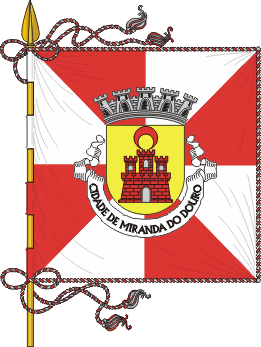
- Flag Coat of arms
- Nickname: Cidade Museu (lit. 'Museum City')
- Interactive map of Miranda do Douro
- Location in Portugal
- Coordinates: 41°29′39″N 6°16′27″W
- Country: Portugal
- Region: Norte
- Intermunic. comm.: Terras de Trás-os-Montes
- District: Bragança
- Parishes: 13

Government
  - President: Artur Manuel Rodrigues Nunes (PS)

Area
  - Total: 487.18 km^{2} (188.10 sq mi)
- Elevation: 752 m (2,467 ft)

Population (2011)
  - Total: 7,482
  - Density: 15.36/km^{2} (39.78/sq mi)
- Time zone: UTC+00:00 (WET)
  - Summer (DST): UTC+01:00 (WEST)
- Postal code: 5210
- Area code: 273
- Patron: Santa Maria Maior
- Website: http://www.cm-mdouro.pt/

Miranda do Douro (Portuguese: [miˈɾɐ̃dɐ ðu ˈðo(w)ɾu]; Mirandese: Miranda de l Douro, [miˈɾãda ð(ə) ɫ̩ ˈdowɾʊ]), officially the City of Miranda do Douro (Portuguese: Cidade de Miranda do Douro; Mirandese: Cidade de Miranda de l Douro), is a city and a municipality in the district of Bragança, northeastern Portugal. The population in 2011 was 7,482, in an area of 487.18 km^{2}. The town proper had a population of 1,960 in 2001. Nicknamed Cidade Museu ("Museum City") of the Trás-os-Montes region, it is located 86 kilometres from Bragança, preserving many of its medieval and Renaissance-era traditions and architecture. It is the main municipality where the Mirandese language survives within the Tierra de Miranda cultural region, which enjoys official status in Portugal, in addition to cultural and historical discontinuity with the rest of the Portuguese state. The town is located on the border with Spain, with the Douro River separating the two countries. The nearest town in Spain is Zamora.

The present mayor is Artur Manuel Rodrigues Nunes (Socialist). The municipal holiday is on 10 July.

== History ==
Bishop Palace

The origin of Miranda do Douro as a populated place is still discussed by historians, but archeologist discoveries give evidence that inhabitants had been living there during the Bronze Age. Around AD 716, the Moors defeated local Visigothic tribes, and occupied some of the lands, calling the area Mir-Hândul.

By the late 11th century, León possessed the region as a stepping-stone to Portugal. The settlement of the village of Miranda developed through the initiative of King Denis, in an area that lay between the lateral slopes of the Douro and Fresno Rivers. It was in Miranda that the Treaty of Alcanices was signed between Denis and Ferdinand IV of Castile, setting the border between the Kingdom of Portugal and the Crown of Castile.

Miranda was founded on 18 December 1286, and immediately elevated to the status of vila (English: town), with one of its prerequisites declaring that the administrative division would be a Crown fief. From that period forward, Miranda became progressively one of the most important towns that skirted the Trás-os-Montes region.

The Castilians occupied Miranda do Douro during the late 14th century, and would remain there until they were expelled by John I of Portugal. On 10 July 1545, King John III elevated Miranda do Douro to the status of city, at the same time becoming the first diocese in Trás-os-Montes (in a papal bull on 22 May 1545 by Pope Paul III, which segmented a major part of the archdiocese of Braga. Miranda, therefore, became the capital of the Trás-os-Montes, seat of the bishopric (that included the residence of the bishop, canons and ecclesiastical authorities), military governorship and civil centre.

In 1762, during the Seven Years' War, the army of Charles III of Spain invaded the Trás-os-Montes. During the course of his invasion, the gunpowder magazine (with over 500 barrels of powder) was hit by a cannon, destroying the four towers of the castle and many of the barrios in the vicinity. Approximately a third of the city's population (about 400 residents) were killed, resulting in the ruin of the religious, demographic and urbanized portion of Miranda. It was almost two years later (1764) that friar Aleixo Miranda Henriques (then the twenty-third bishop) would abandon Miranda, moving to Bragança, which had become a rival episcopal seat in the northeast part of Portugal. By 1680, it was the only ecclesiastical seat in the region.

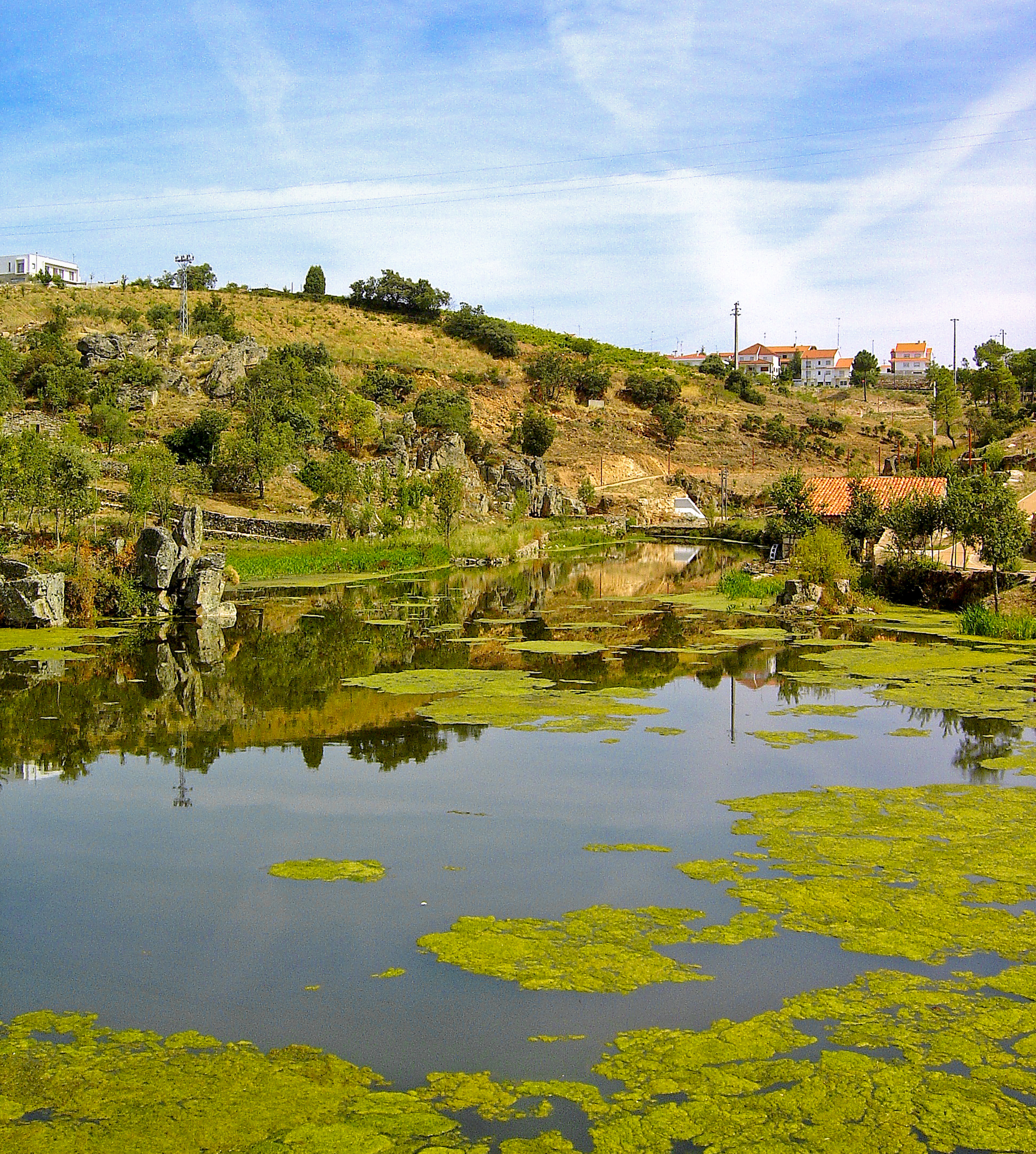
Urban park.

The area was served by a narrow gauge railway, the Sabor line (Linha do Sabor), which ran over 100 km between Duas Igrejas-Miranda and the southern terminus at Pocinho, where connections could be made to the main line to Porto. The Sabor line closed in 1988.

== Geography ==
=== Physical geography ===
Miranda do Douro is located in a region that skirts the border between the Portuguese Trás-os-Montes region, and the Spanish autonomous community of Castile and León. The relief in this region is influenced by hard quartzite deposits near the border region, making erosion difficult, resulting in high escarpments and cliffs. The soils are composed of schists and granite bedrocks.

==== Ecoregions/Protected areas ====
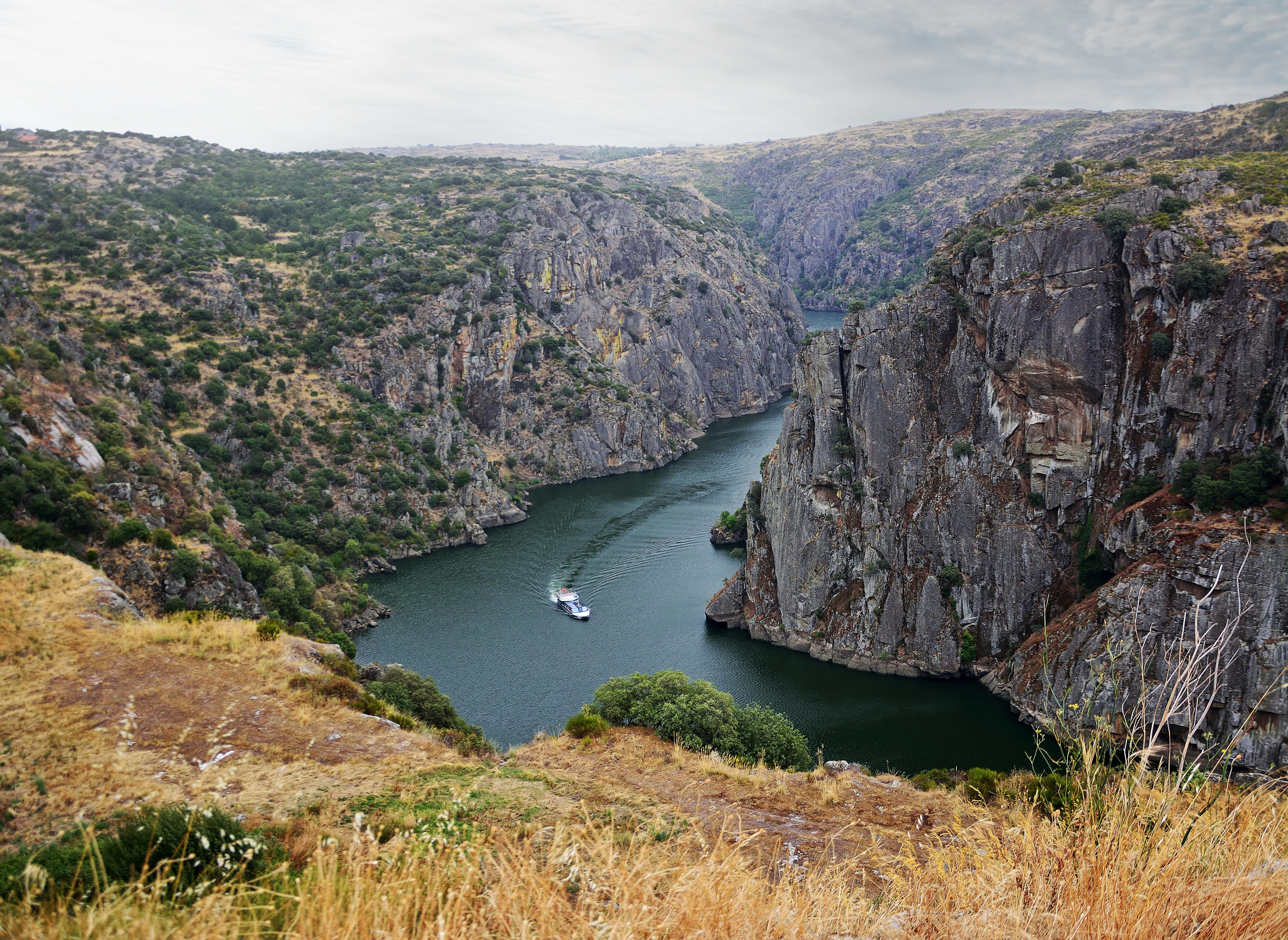
Douro International Natural Park.

The Parque Natural do Douro Internacional (English: Douro International Nature Park), which encompasses the municipalities of Figueira de Castelo Rodrigo, Freixo de Espada à Cinta, Miranda do Douro and Mogadouro, includes an area of 85,150 hectares (328.8 sq mi), along the border portion of the Douro River. It was created on 11 May 1998 to encompass the constituent territories that encompass the Rivers Douro and Águeda, along the Spain-Portugal border that include similar geological and climatic conditions, and to help support flora and fauna in the region, while allowing appropriate human activities. The creation of the complementary Parque Natural de Arribes in Spain, allowed the systematic protection of an area that encompassed the larger ecosystem and biome.

== Climate ==
Miranda do Douro has a hot summer mediterranean climate (Köppen climate classification: Csa) with some continental influences due to its long distance from the sea. Its climate is similar to that of Bragança, although it is drier, as it is further from the Atlantic Ocean and consequently less affected by Atlantic depressions.

Summers are hot, with temperatures exceeding 30 °C (86 °F) and occasionally 35 °C (95 °F). Winters are cool, but cold by Portuguese standards, with temperatures frequently below 0 °C (32 °F) and on cold nights it can drop below −5 °C (23 °F). On average, there are 58 days of frost per year. Due to its inland location in the Nordeste Transmontano, the area experiences extreme weather fluctuations. A common saying of the region goes: Em Miranda há nove meses de Inverno e três de Inferno ("In Miranda there are nine months of winter and three months of Hell").

Climate data for Miranda do Douro (1991–2020), extremes (1971-present)
Month	Jan	Feb	Mar	Apr	May	Jun	Jul	Aug	Sep	Oct	Nov	Dec	Year
Record high °C (°F)	17.2 (63.0)	21.6 (70.9)	26.5 (79.7)	29.8 (85.6)	36.0 (96.8)	40.6 (105.1)	42.0 (107.6)	40.8 (105.4)	38.8 (101.8)	32.3 (90.1)	23.2 (73.8)	20.5 (68.9)	42.0 (107.6)
Mean daily maximum °C (°F)	8.9 (48.0)	11.4 (52.5)	15.0 (59.0)	17.0 (62.6)	21.4 (70.5)	26.8 (80.2)	30.5 (86.9)	30.2 (86.4)	25.6 (78.1)	19.2 (66.6)	12.6 (54.7)	9.4 (48.9)	19.0 (66.2)
Daily mean °C (°F)	4.6 (40.3)	5.9 (42.6)	8.9 (48.0)	11.0 (51.8)	14.7 (58.5)	19.2 (66.6)	22.2 (72.0)	21.9 (71.4)	18.2 (64.8)	13.4 (56.1)	8.0 (46.4)	5.2 (41.4)	12.8 (55.0)
Mean daily minimum °C (°F)	0.4 (32.7)	0.4 (32.7)	2.8 (37.0)	4.9 (40.8)	8.0 (46.4)	11.5 (52.7)	13.8 (56.8)	13.7 (56.7)	10.9 (51.6)	7.5 (45.5)	3.4 (38.1)	0.9 (33.6)	6.5 (43.7)
Record low °C (°F)	−12.3 (9.9)	−11.6 (11.1)	−13.2 (8.2)	−5.2 (22.6)	−3.4 (25.9)	2.1 (35.8)	4.8 (40.6)	4.3 (39.7)	−0.2 (31.6)	−4.9 (23.2)	−10.3 (13.5)	−10.6 (12.9)	−13.2 (8.2)
Average precipitation mm (inches)	71.1 (2.80)	43.9 (1.73)	51.1 (2.01)	57.1 (2.25)	52.2 (2.06)	27.5 (1.08)	12.4 (0.49)	17.7 (0.70)	34.7 (1.37)	85.7 (3.37)	71.0 (2.80)	75.9 (2.99)	600.2 (23.63)
Average precipitation days (≥ 1 mm)	9.3	6.7	7.8	9.2	8.1	4.3	2.0	2.6	4.9	9.2	8.9	8.5	81.4
Source: Instituto Português do Mar e da Atmosfera

Climate data for Miranda do Douro, elevation: 693 m or 2,274 ft, 1971-2000 normals and extremes
Month	Jan	Feb	Mar	Apr	May	Jun	Jul	Aug	Sep	Oct	Nov	Dec	Year
Record high °C (°F)	16.5 (61.7)	20.0 (68.0)	23.8 (74.8)	28.5 (83.3)	31.4 (88.5)	36.1 (97.0)	39.4 (102.9)	40.8 (105.4)	38.6 (101.5)	29.2 (84.6)	23.2 (73.8)	20.5 (68.9)	40.8 (105.4)
Mean daily maximum °C (°F)	8.2 (46.8)	11.0 (51.8)	14.1 (57.4)	15.6 (60.1)	19.3 (66.7)	24.7 (76.5)	28.8 (83.8)	28.9 (84.0)	24.9 (76.8)	18.4 (65.1)	12.6 (54.7)	9.2 (48.6)	18.0 (64.4)
Daily mean °C (°F)	4.1 (39.4)	6.1 (43.0)	8.3 (46.9)	10.0 (50.0)	13.4 (56.1)	17.9 (64.2)	21.2 (70.2)	21.1 (70.0)	17.9 (64.2)	12.7 (54.9)	7.8 (46.0)	5.4 (41.7)	12.2 (53.9)
Mean daily minimum °C (°F)	0.0 (32.0)	1.1 (34.0)	2.5 (36.5)	4.4 (39.9)	7.6 (45.7)	11.1 (52.0)	13.5 (56.3)	13.4 (56.1)	11.0 (51.8)	7.2 (45.0)	3.1 (37.6)	1.5 (34.7)	6.4 (43.5)
Record low °C (°F)	−12.3 (9.9)	−11.6 (11.1)	−13.2 (8.2)	−5.2 (22.6)	−3.4 (25.9)	2.1 (35.8)	5.1 (41.2)	4.3 (39.7)	−0.2 (31.6)	−4.9 (23.2)	−6.0 (21.2)	−7.4 (18.7)	−13.2 (8.2)
Average rainfall mm (inches)	62.9 (2.48)	54.2 (2.13)	29.9 (1.18)	56.4 (2.22)	59.3 (2.33)	35.9 (1.41)	16.3 (0.64)	14.4 (0.57)	33.8 (1.33)	60.5 (2.38)	61.7 (2.43)	76.4 (3.01)	561.7 (22.11)
Average precipitation days	11.3	10.8	8.6	11.7	11.0	7.0	4.0	3.9	5.8	9.6	8.8	12.0	104.5
Average snowy days	1.1	0.6	0.5	0.4	0.1	0	0	0	0	0	0.1	0.3	3.1
Mean monthly sunshine hours	100.2	137.9	200.7	203.7	248.0	306.4	348.1	331.7	227.7	183.4	136.9	93.2	2,517.9
Source: Instituto de Meteorologia

=== Human geography ===
Population of Miranda do Douro (1801 - 2011)
Year	Pop.	±%
1801	88,881	—
1849	7,146	−92.0%
1900	10,639	+48.9%
1930	11,272	+5.9%
1960	18,972	+68.3%
1981	9,948	−47.6%
1991	8,697	−12.6%
2001	8,048	−7.5%
2011	7,482	−7.0%

Administratively, the municipality is divided into 13 civil parishes (freguesias):

- Constantim e Cicouro (Mirandese: Custantin i Cicouro)
- Duas Igrejas (Mirandese: Dues Eigreijas)
- Genísio (Mirandese: Zenízio)
- Ifanes e Paradela (Mirandese: Infainç i Paradela)
- Malhadas
- Miranda do Douro (Mirandese: Miranda de l Douro)
- Palaçoulo (Mirandese: Palaçuolo)
- Picote (Mirandese: Picuote)
- Póvoa (Mirandese: Pruoba)
- São Martinho de Angueira (Mirandese: San Martino)
- Sendim e Atenor (Mirandese: Sendin i Atanor)
- Silva e Águas Vivas (Mirandese: Silba i Augas Bibas)
- Vila Chã de Braciosa (Mirandese: Bila Chana de Barceosa)

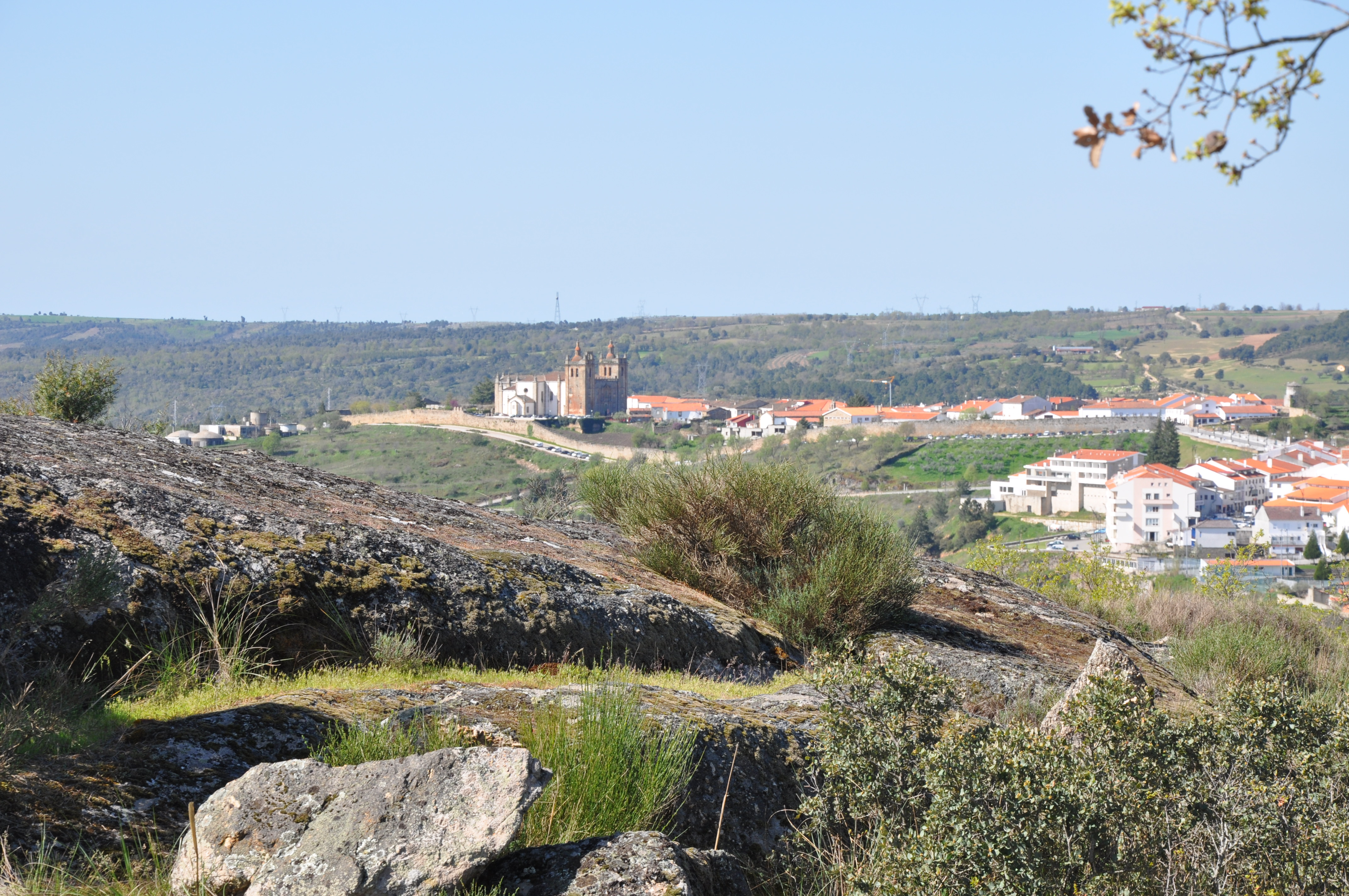
The municipal seat and principal town of the municipality of Miranda.

== Twin towns – sister cities ==
Miranda do Douro is twinned with:

- Aranda de Duero, Spain
- Bimenes, Spain

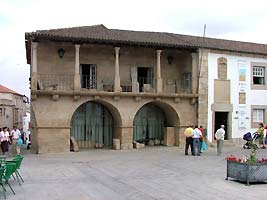
"Museu da Terra de Miranda" (museum of the lands of Miranda).

== Culture ==
The city has been isolated from the rest of the country for many centuries, so the ancestral way of life is still vivid in the traditions and even in the language (see below). Apart from the distance, the weather conditions are also an adversary, as it is very cold and snowy in winter, and very dry and hot in summer.

Gastronomy is one of the local hallmarks, well within the tradition of Trás-os Montes. "Posta à Mirandesa", a heavy, thick steak, is the traditional dish, known and imitated through the rest of the country. The wine from the region has a high alcoholic graduation (17–18°) and matches the regional cuisine well.

The city's old quarter, with the cathedral, dates back to the Middle Ages. Most houses are small and one story high. Inside the old city proper lie the town hall and museum, the "Museu da Terra de Miranda" (museum of the lands of Miranda), which has displays of archaeological findings, farm life, local clothing, and traditional masks.

The city has no industries but depends on commercial activity, mainly the sale of house textiles and cutlery from the village of Palaçoulo. Spaniards come in great number on holidays and weekends. There are several hotels, among them the Pousada de Santa Catarina, which overlooks the Douro River.

=== Mirandese language ===
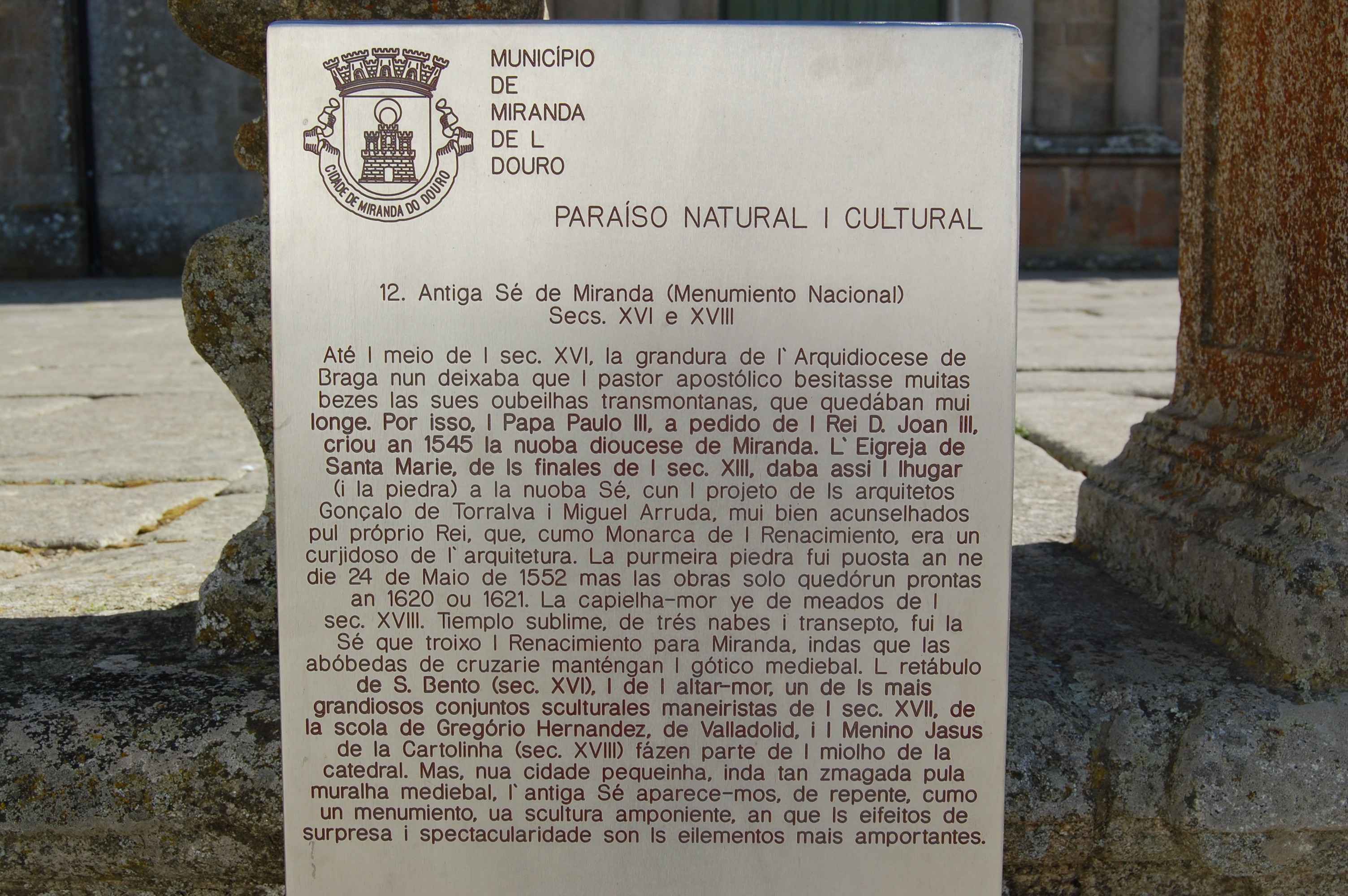
Sign outside the Cathedral of Miranda do Douro in the Mirandese language.

The surrounding area is home to the speakers of Mirandese (Mirandês), a language of the Astur-Leonese family, related to Asturian and Leonese. Mirandese was recognised in 1999 by the Portuguese state as co-official with Portuguese for local matters, and an estimate of between 10,000 and 15,000 people speak the language.

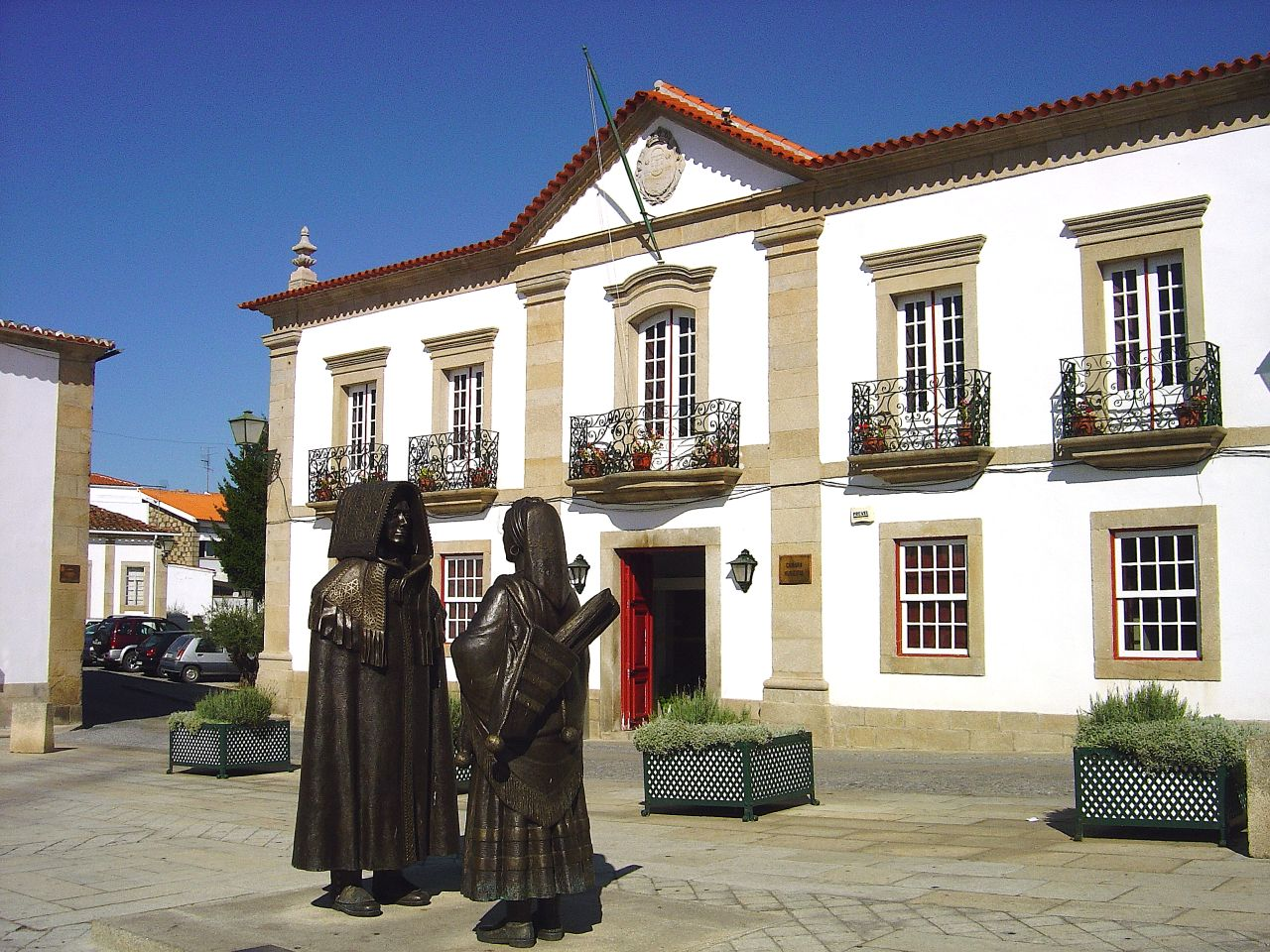
Municipality.

== Tourism ==
Miranda do Douro is in the middle of Douro International Natural Park, also known as Parque Natural do Douro Internacional in Portuguese, which is a protected natural area located in northeastern Portugal and northwestern Spain. The natural park promotes the unique ecological and cultural heritage of the region.

The park is situated along the Douro River, which forms the border between Portugal and Spain for a significant portion of its course. It covers an area of approximately 85,000 hectares (210,000 acres), with about two-thirds of the park located in Portugal and the remaining third in Spain.

The walking trail from Miranda do Douro to São João das Arribas offers views of the Douro River and the surrounding landscapes. The trail starts in Miranda do Douro and leads to São João das Arribas, which is known for its cliffs overlooking the Douro River.

== Notable citizens ==
- Leonel Vieira (born 1969) film director in late 20th and early 21st century; filmed the video Rosa Branca for fadist Mariza.

== See also ==
- Kingdom of León
- Leonese language
- Planalto Mirandes IPR
- Terra de Miranda
