= Mirandese language =

Asturleonese language

Mirandese
- mirandés, lhéngua/léngua mirandesa, charro
- Native to: Portugal
- Region: Eastern Tierra de Miranda (Miranda de l Douro and eastern Bumioso)
- Ethnicity: Mirandese people
- Native speakers: 3,500 speakers, 1,000 common users of the language. (2020)
- Language family: Indo-European: Italic; Latino-Faliscan; Latin; Romance; Italo-Western; Western; Ibero-Romance; West Iberian; Asturleonese; Mirandese
- Early forms: Old Latin: Vulgar Latin; Proto-Romance; Old Leonese

Official status
- Official language in: Co-official recognition. Special protection status in Miranda de l Douro, Portugal. Statutory language of provincial identity in 4 municipalities, northeast Portugal (1999, Law No. 7-99 of 29 January).
- Regulated by: Anstituto de la Lhéngua Mirandesa

Language codes
- ISO 639-2: mwl
- ISO 639-3: mwl
- Glottolog: mira1251
- ELP: Miranda do Douro
- Linguasphere: 51-AAA-cb
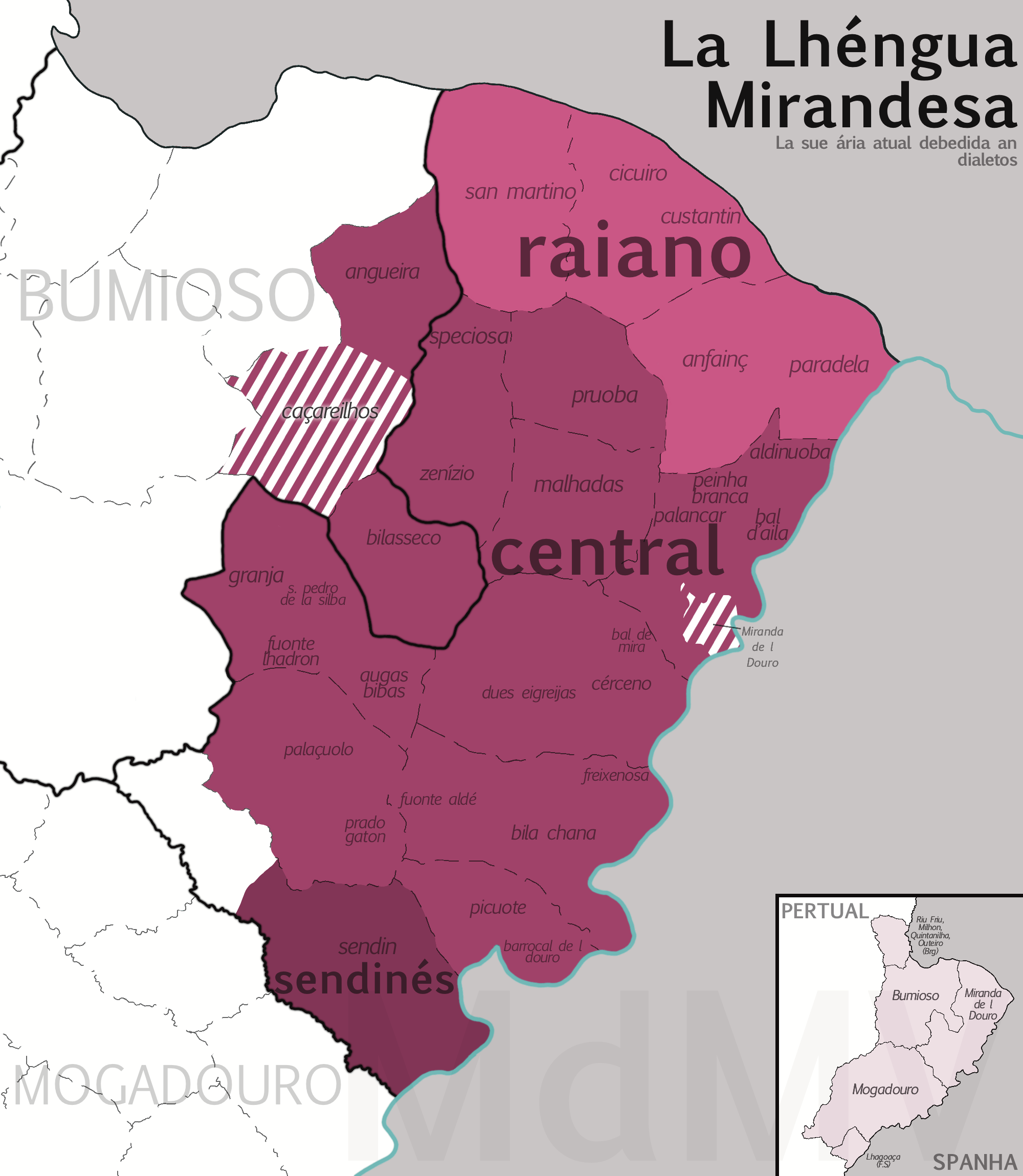
- Map of the Mirandese-speaking regions of Portugal, highlighting the language's three dialects: Central Mirandese Sendinese Mirandese Raiano Mirandese

- Mirandese is classified as Definitely Endangered by the UNESCO Atlas of the World's Languages in Danger

- People: Mirandese people (Mirandeses)
- Language: Mirandese (Mirandés)
- Country: (Land of) Miranda ((Tierra de) Miranda)

Central Mirandese reading of the poem "Lhiçon de Giografie" (transl. "Geography Lesson"), written originally in the Sendinese dialect ("Liçon de Giografie").

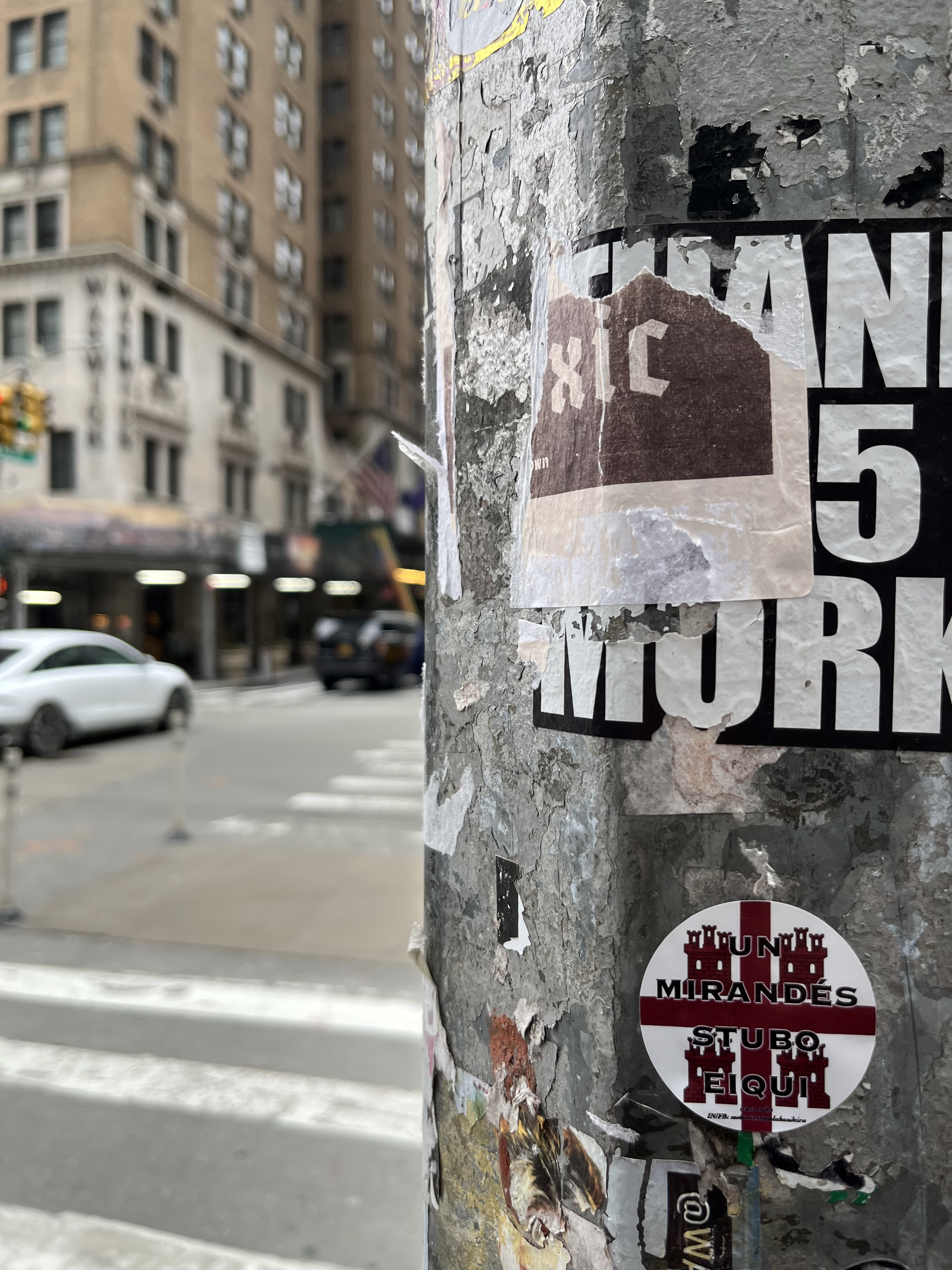
A sticker located in New York City showing the Mirandese text Un mirandés stubo eiqui (transl. A Mirandese (person) was here). An unofficial flag for the Mirandese people is displayed behind the text.

Mirandese (mirandés [miɾãˈdes̺, -ɾãŋ-]) (Note: Also called lhéngua mirandesa [ˈʎẽɡwa miɾãˈdez̺a, ˈʎẽŋ-, -ɾãŋ-] in Central and Raiano, and léngua mirandesa [ˈlẽɡwa miɾãˈdez̺a, ˈlẽŋ-, -ɾãŋ-] in Sendinese) is an Asturleonese language or variety that is sparsely spoken in a small area of northeastern Portugal in eastern Tierra de Miranda, an ethnocultural region comprising the area around the municipalities of Miranda de l Douro, Mogadouro and Bumioso. It is extinct in Mogadouro and present in Bumioso only in some eastern villages, like Angueira. The Assembly of the Republic granted Mirandese official recognition alongside Portuguese for local matters with Law 7/99 of 29 January 1999. In 2001, Mirandese was officially recognised by the European Bureau for Lesser-Used Languages, which aimed to promote the survival of the least-spoken European languages.

Mirandese has a distinct phonology, morphology and syntax. It has its roots in the local Vulgar Latin spoken in the northern Iberian Peninsula.

The language is a descendant of the Asturleonese variety spoken in the Kingdom of León and has both archaisms and innovations that differentiate it from the modern varieties of Asturleonese spoken in Spain. In recognition of these differences, and due to its political isolation from the other Asturleonese-speaking regions, Mirandese has adopted a different written norm to the one used in Spain for Asturleonese.

== History ==
Mirandese is a descendant of the Old Leonese language spoken in the Kingdom of León in medieval Iberia. In the early 16th century, Old Leonese began to split, alongside Galician–Portuguese, into the varieties existing today, one of them being Mirandese.

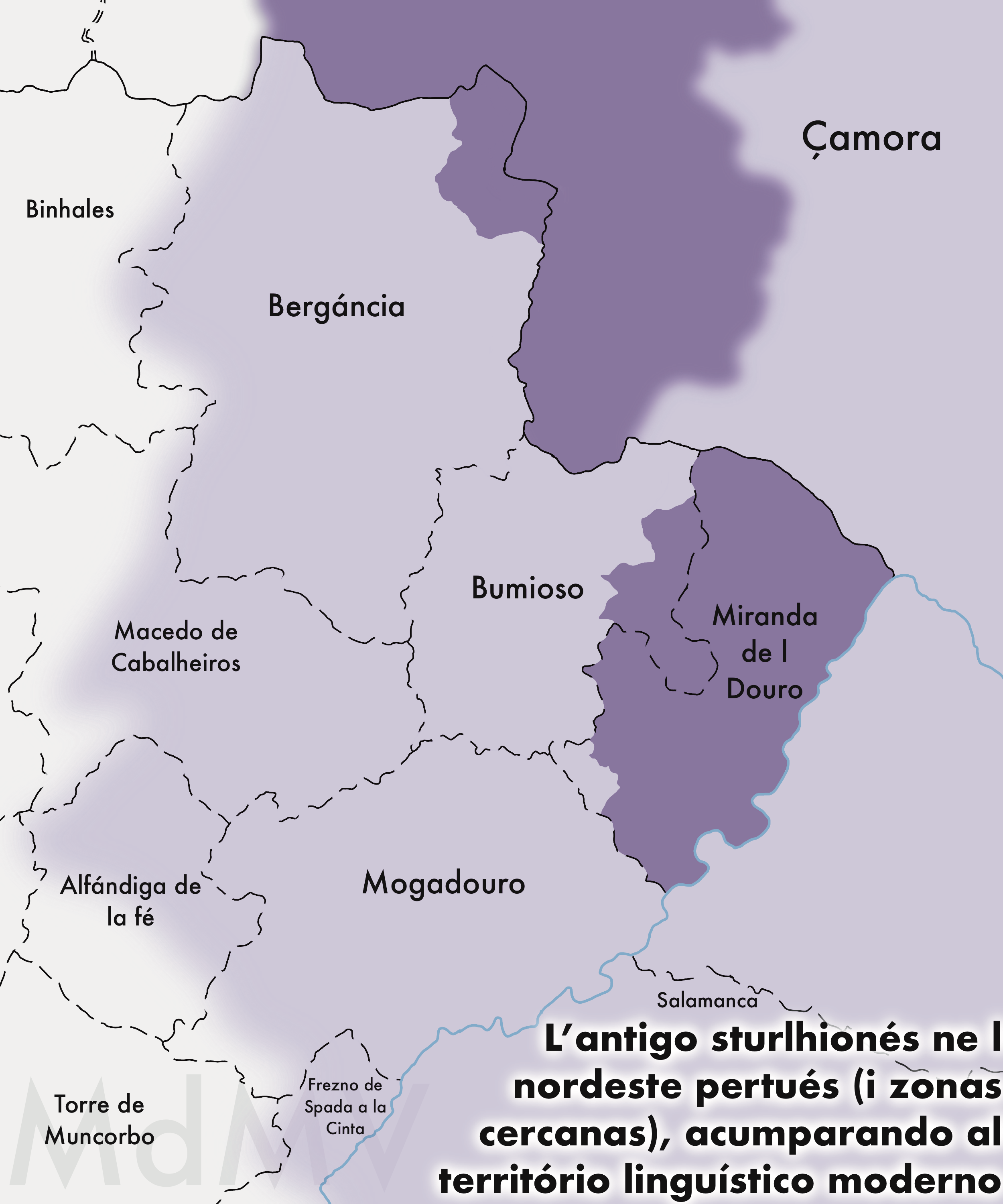
Rough geographical distribution of Old Asturleonese (in light purple) in northeastern Portugal and surrounding areas, in comparison to its modern descendants, including Mirandese (in dark purple).

Until 1884, Mirandese was a purely spoken language, but in that year, José Leite de Vasconcelos wrote the book Flores Mirandézas (transl. Mirandese Flowers, Froles Mirandesas in Mirandese), in which he proposed a writing system for Mirandese. The system included a large number of diacritics which have helped to convey how Mirandese sounded in the 19th century.

Transcribed below is a poem included in Flores Mirandézas as a sample text, "La Lhêngua Mirandéza" (transl. "The Mirandese Language", spelled "La Lhéngua Mirandesa" in the modern orthography):

Vasconcelos's orthography (1884)	First official orthography (1990s)	Current orthography	English translation
Qĭêm dirĭê q'antre 'ls matos èiriçados / Las ourrĭêtas i 'ls ríus d'ésta tĭêrra / Bibĭê, cumo l chaguárço de la ſĭêrra / Ũṅa lhêngua de ſóuns tã bariados? / Mostre-ſe i fále-ſ' éssa lhêngua, filha / D'um póbo qe tĭêm néilha 'l chóro i 'l canto! / Nada pur çĭêrto mus câutíba tânto / Cumo la fórm' am qe l'idéia brilha. (...)	Quiên dirie qu'antre ls matos eiriçados / Las ourriêtas i ls rius desta tiêrra / Bibie, cumo l chaguarço de la siêrra / Ũa lhéngua de sons tan bariados? / Mostre-se i fale-se essa lhéngua, filha / Dun pobo que ten neilha l choro i l canto! / Nada por ciêrto mos cautiba tanto / Cumo la forma an que l'eideia brilha. (...)	Quien dirie qu'antre ls matos eiriçados / Las ourrietas i ls rius desta tierra / Bibie, cumo l chaguarço de la sierra / Ũa lhéngua de sons tan bariados? / Mostre-se i fale-se essa lhéngua, filha / Dun pobo que ten neilha l choro i l canto! / Nada por cierto mos cautiba tanto / Cumo la forma an que l'eideia brilha. (...)	Who would say that amongst the bristle bushes / The valleys and the rivers of this land / There lived, like the plants of the mountain range / A language of such varied sounds? / Let this language be heard and spoken, daughter / Of people that have in it the cry and the song! / Nothing certainly captivates us as much / As the way in which this idea shines. (...)

In the 19th century, Leite de Vasconcelos described Mirandese as "the language of the farms, of work, home, and love between the Mirandese". Since 1986–87, it has been taught optionally to students at the primary and lower secondary level, and has thus been somewhat recovering. By Law 7/99, Mirandese was given official recognition by the Assembly of the Republic alongside Portuguese. The law provides for its promotion and allows its usage for local matters in Miranda de l Douro.

In 1999, Mirandese gained its first official orthography, which was later tweaked in 2000. Today Mirandese retains speakers in most of the villages of the municipality of Miranda de l Douro and in some villages of Bumioso (such as Vilar Seco and Angueira); and some linguistic influence can be observed at other villages of the municipality of Bumioso and the municipalities of Mogadouro, Macedo de Cavaleiros and Bragança.

A 2020 survey by the University of Vigo, carried out in Miranda de l Douro and Bumioso, estimated the number of speakers of the language to be around 3,500, with 1,500 of them being regular speakers. The study observed strong decline in the usage of the language in younger people, verifying a roughly 40% decline in the exclusive use of Mirandese across the 32 settlements where it is still spoken, when comparing speakers aged over 60 to the teen population, alongside a modest increase of about 8% in bilingual usage between those same demographics.

== Lack of protection measures ==
There are significant limitations in the protection of the Mirandese language:

- Portugal has not ratified the European Charter for Regional or Minority Languages.
- There is no Mirandese law, its use in courts or public administration is not legal.
- The budget for the protection and promotion of Mirandese is not implemented.
- Lack of specialized teacher training, translations and media.
- Education in Mirandese is not mandatory and discouraged.
- Most software applications do not support Mirandese, with the exceptions of SwiftKey and HeliBoard on mobile.

The following measures have been taken to protect and develop Mirandese:

- Allow primary teaching staff in the district of Miranda de l Douro to teach in Mirandese, since 1986/1987, thanks to the ministerial authorisation published on 9 September 1985.
- Publish books in Mirandese and about the Mirandese language, promoted by the Council of Miranda de l Douro.
- Facilitate annual celebrations in the city as well as a literary competition, promoted by the Council of Miranda do Douro.
- Use Mirandese in town celebrations, official commemorations and, occasionally, on social media.
- Publish two volumes of the Asterix comic books.
- Translate all the toponymic signs in Miranda do Douro, promoted by the Council of Miranda do Douro in 2006.
- Develop studies by research centres in Portugal, such as "Atlas Linguístico de Portugal", by the Centro de Linguística at University of Lisbon, and "Inquérito Linguístico Boléo", by the University of Coimbra.
- Create Biquipédia, a Mirandese-language Wikipedia.
- Make sites available in Mirandese, such as Photoblog and WordPress.
- Record Mirandese music, with singers including Roberto Leal in his albums Canto da Terra (2007) and Raiç/Raíz (2010).
- Integrated into the SwiftKey keyboard in 2018, with autocorrect and word suggestions.
- Participation in the European Language Equality project (2021–2022), which promotes digital equality by 2030.
- Create a GNOME Translation Team to help translate Linux distros into Mirandese.

== Recognition ==
Mirandese, given its status as a recognised language in Portugal after Portuguese, has been the subject in recent years of some publicity and attention in other parts of Portugal. A monthly chronicle in Mirandese, by researcher and writer Amadeu Ferreira, appeared in the daily Portuguese national newspaper Público. The first volume of the Adventures of Asterix, named Asterix, L Goulés (Asterix the Gaul), was published in a Mirandese translation by Amadeu Ferreira in 2005, and sold throughout Portugal. Amadeu Ferreira also translated into Mirandese the epic poem by Camões, Os Lusíadas (Ls Lusíadas), under his pseudonym Francisco Niebro, and published it in 2009. In 2011, the four Gospels of the Bible's New Testament were translated into Mirandese, and in 2013 the entire Bible was translated into the language by Domingos Augusto Ferreira.

== Variants ==
Three primary variants of the Mirandese language exist: Border Mirandese (Mirandés Raiano), Central Mirandese (Mirandés Central) and Sendinese (Sendinés). Most speakers of Mirandese also speak Portuguese.

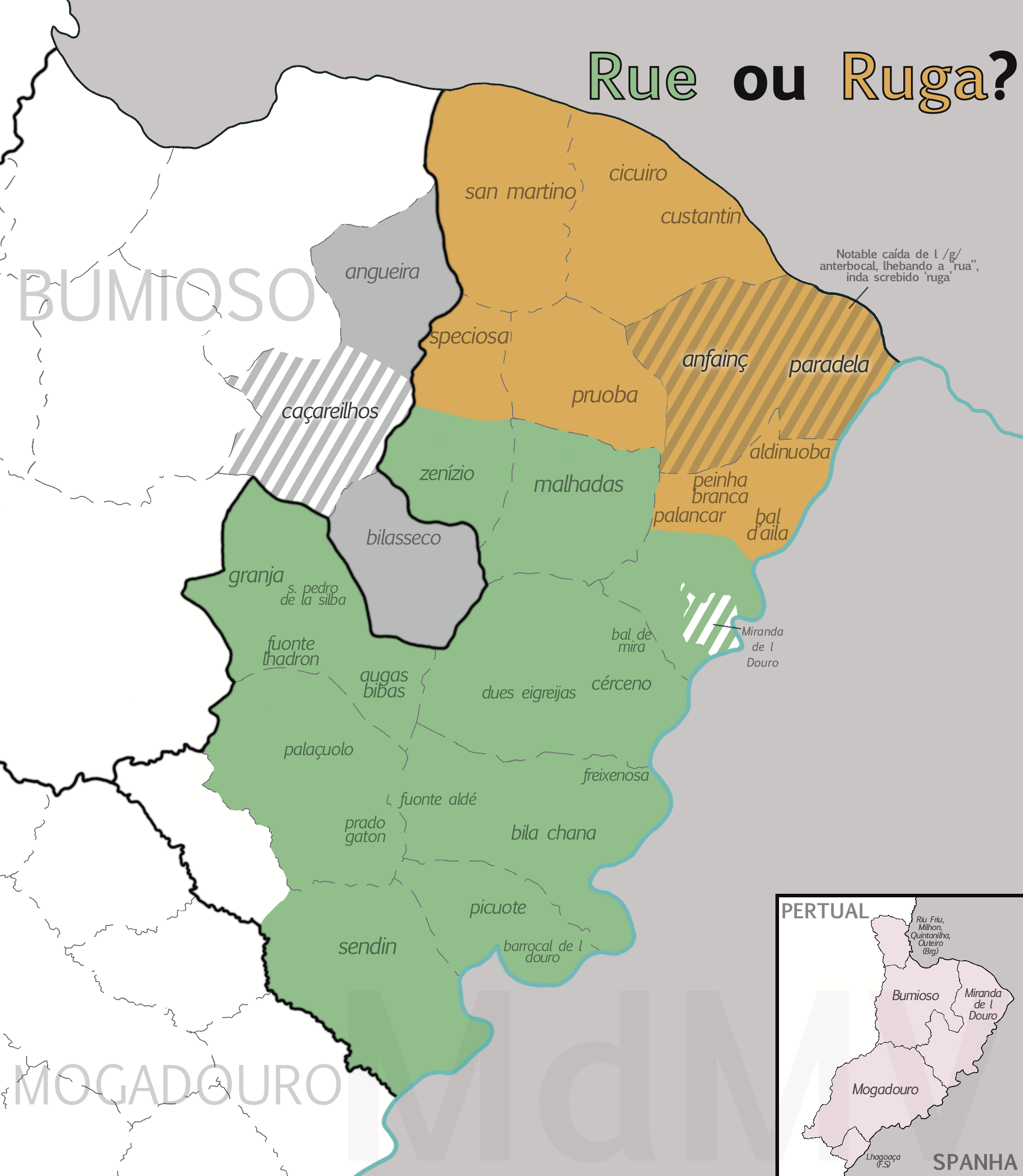
Map demonstrating the dialectal variations of the word “street” in Mirandese: rue / ruga.

Despite there being a singular writing system for Mirandese, there is one phoneme that is written differently in different dialects. In the Sendinese dialect, many words that in other dialects are said with /ʎ/ ⟨lh⟩, are said with /l/ ⟨l⟩: examples include alá for alhá 'over there'; lado for lhado 'side'; luç for lhuç 'light'.

The main orthographical differences between Mirandese in Portugal and the Asturleonese languages in Spain are caused by the dominant languages in each region. And while Mirandese has been influenced phonetically and in lexicon by Portuguese and the Asturleonese languages in Spain by Spanish, they retain more similarities among themselves than to the main languages of each country. Another difference is that Mirandese and Leonese remain very conservative, while Asturian has undergone a greater amount of change.

== Phonology ==
=== Development ===
Some historical developments in Mirandese are the following:

- Mirandese maintains distinct reflexes of all seven Ibero-Romance sibilants:

Proto–Ibero-Romance	Mirandese	Portuguese	Northern/Central Spanish
/t͡ʃ/	/t͡ʃ/ ⟨ch⟩	/ʃ/ ⟨ch⟩	/t͡ʃ/ ⟨ch⟩
/ʃ/	/ʃ/ ⟨x⟩	/ʃ/ ⟨x⟩	/x/ ⟨j⟩
/ʒ/ or /d͡ʒ/	/ʒ/ ⟨g⟩ / ⟨j⟩	/ʒ/ ⟨g⟩ / ⟨j⟩	/x/ ⟨g⟩ / ⟨j⟩
/t͡s/	/s̻/ ⟨c⟩ / ⟨ç⟩	/s̻/ ⟨c⟩ / ⟨ç⟩	/θ/ ⟨c⟩ / ⟨z⟩
/d͡z/	/z̻/ ⟨z⟩	/z̻/ ⟨z⟩	/θ/ ⟨c⟩ / ⟨z⟩
/s̺/	/s̺/ ⟨s-⟩ / ⟨-ss-⟩	/s̻/ ⟨s-⟩ / ⟨-ss-⟩	/s̺/ ⟨s⟩
/z̺/	/z̺/ ⟨-s-⟩	/z̻/ ⟨-s-⟩	/s̺/ ⟨-s-⟩

/s̺/ and /z̺/ indicate apico-alveolar sibilants (as in modern Catalan, northern/central peninsular Spanish and coastal northern European Portuguese), while /s̻/ and /z̻/ are dentalized laminal alveolar sibilants (as in most modern Portuguese, French and English). The unrelated Basque language also maintains a distinction between /s̺/ and /s̻/ (Basque has no voiced sibilants), which suggests that the distinction originally was an areal feature across Iberia.

Portuguese spelling still distinguishes all seven sibilants and is identical to Mirandese spelling in this respect, but in pronunciation, Portuguese has reduced them to four /s, z, ʃ, ʒ/ except in northern hinterland European Portuguese dialects, including those in the area where Mirandese is also spoken. Northern/central Peninsular Spanish has also reduced them to four but in quite a different way: /t͡ʃ, θ, s̺, x/. Western Andalusian Spanish and Latin American Spanish have further reduced them to three: /t͡ʃ, s̻, x/.

- Retention of the initial /f/ from Latin, like all of Western and Central Asturleonese and Galician-Portuguese.
- Development of the Latin initial consonant clusters /pl/, /kl/, /fl/ evolve into /t͡ʃ/, as in Leonese and Galician-Portuguese.
- Development of the medial clusters /-li-/ and /-kl-/ as /-ʎ-/, like in Galician-Portuguese and various Western Asturleonese varieties.
- The cluster /-mb-/ is kept, like various Asturleonese varieties.
- Development of -mn- as /m/: lūm'nem > lume.
- Preservation of the falling diphthongs /ei/ and /ou/, like Western Asturleonese and Galician Portuguese, but not any other Asturleonese varieties nor Castilian.
- Raising of final o to /u/, as in Asturleonese and Galician-Portuguese.
- Retention of voiced sibilants, like Portuguese, but unlike most West-Iberian varieties of Spain.
- Retention of intervocalic /l/, /n/, like all West-Iberian varieties besides Galician-Portuguese
- Frequent diphthongization of Western Romance /ɛ/, /ɔ/ to /je/, /wo/, as in some Leonese varieties; this happens not only before palatals, as in Aragonese, but also before nasals.
- Word-initial palatalization of /l/, as in other Asturleonese varieties and Catalan.

=== Consonants ===
		Labial	Dental	Alveolar	Palatal	Velar
Nasal		m ⟨m⟩	n ⟨n⟩		ɲ ⟨nh⟩	ŋ ⟨ũ, n⟩ (Note: The voiced velar nasal [ŋ] only appears intervocalically in the word ũa ('a/one' in the feminine singular), contractions including it (such as dalgũa or cũa) and their respective plurals. Therefore, [ŋ] does not have its own letter or digraph in these words, ⟨ũ⟩ representing [ũŋ] or [ʊ̃ŋ]. One could argue that [ŋ] does not even have any symbol representing it, ⟨ũ⟩ representing [ũ] or [ʊ̃] and the reader is supposed to know that the voiced velar nasal exists in said word.)
Plosive	voiceless	p ⟨p⟩	t ⟨t⟩			k ⟨c, qu⟩
Plosive	voiced	b ⟨b⟩	d ⟨d⟩			ɡ ⟨g, gu⟩
Affricate	voiceless				tʃ ⟨ch⟩	
Fricative	voiceless	f ⟨f⟩	s̻ ⟨c, ç⟩	s̺ ⟨s, ss⟩	ʃ ⟨x⟩	
Fricative	voiced		z̻ ⟨z, (ç)⟩	z̺ ⟨s⟩	ʒ ⟨j⟩	
Approximant	median				ʝ~j ⟨y⟩	(w) ⟨u-⟩
Approximant	lateral		l ⟨l⟩		ʎ ⟨lh⟩	
Trill				r ⟨r, rr⟩		
Tap				ɾ ⟨r⟩		

- As stated above, the laminal dental sibilants correspond to Portuguese /s, z/. These are spelled c/ç and z. The corresponding alveolar sibilants are apical and are spelled s(s) and s. Furthermore, there is an additional palatal affricate /tʃ/ ch that is distinct from the fricative /ʃ/, spelled x. The voiced /ʒ/ is spelled j or g, as in Portuguese. Standard Portuguese has reduced all these sounds to just four fricatives: /s, z, ʃ, ʒ/.
- The "hard" or "long" R is an alveolar trill /r/, as in other varieties of Asturleonese and in Spanish. The Portuguese uvular fricative [ʁ] is not found in Mirandese. The "soft" or "short" R is an ordinary alveolar tap [ɾ] commonly found in the Iberian Peninsula. As in other languages spoken in the region, the two contrast only in word-internal position.
- Voiced stops /b, d, ɡ/ may be lenited as fricatives [β, ð, ɣ].

=== Vowels ===
Mirandese has the same basic phonemes as most Asturleonese varieties, but with some differences in allophones:

Mirandese vowels
	Front	Central	Back
Close	i		u
Mid	e		o
Open		a	

- /a/ has allophones of [ä, ɐ], /e/ of [ɛ, e, ɨ~ə], /i/ of [i, ɪ], /o/ of [ɔ, o, u, ʊ], and /u/ of [u, ʊ].
- Vowels /i, u/ can become glides [j~ʝ, w] when preceding or following other vowels.
- All vowel phonemes have nasal counterparts, reflected in all its allophones.

== Orthography ==
Mirandese is written using the Latin alphabet, and its orthography is based on that of Portuguese:

Letters and Digraphs		Names	IPA
Uppercase	Lowercase	Names	IPA
A	a	á	[a]
AN	an	—	[ã(ŋ)]
B	b	bé	[b], [β]
C	c	cé, qué	[k], [s̻]
Ç	ç	cé de cedilha	[s̻], [z̻]
D	d	dé	[d], [ð]
E	e	é	[ə~e~ɛ]
EN	en	—	[ə̃~ẽ~ɛ̃(ŋ)]
F	f	fé	[f]
G	g	gué	[g], [ɣ], [ʒ]
H	h	hagá	—
I	i	i	[i], [ɪ], [j] ([ɨj], Sendinese)
IN	in	—	[ĩ(ŋ)], [ɪ̃(ŋ)] [j̃] ([ɨj̃], Sendinese)
J	j	jé	[ʒ]
L	l	lé	[l], [ɫ]
LH	lh	—	[ʎ]
M	m	mé	[m],[ ̃ ]
N	n	né	[n], [ ̃ ], [ŋ]
NH	nh	—	[ɲ]
O	o	ó	[o~ɔ] [u~ʊ]
ON	on	—	[õ~ɔ̃(ŋ)]
P	p	pé	[p]
Q	q	qué	[k]
R	r	ré	[ɾ], [r]
RR	rr	—	[r]
S	s	sé	[s̺], [z̺]
SS	ss	—	[s̺]
T	t	té	[t]
U	u	u	[u~ʊ], [w]
UN	un	—	[ũ~ʊ̃(ŋ)]
X	x	xiç	[ʃ], [k͡s̻]
Y	y	i griego	[j~ʝ]
Z	z	zé	[z̻]

=== Superseded orthography ===
When Mirandese was first officially recognised and a writing system was established, it used ⟨ê⟩ and ⟨ô⟩ (like Portuguese) to represent [e] and [o] respectively in the diphthongs ⟨uô⟩ and ⟨iê⟩. These have since fallen in disuse because this rendering was only accurate in the Central and Raiano dialects, where these diphthongs read [wo] and [je], unlike in the Sendinese dialect, where they had been reduced to [u] and [i].

In 2000, the "purmeira adenda" (''first addendum'') was made to the Mirandese orthography, quickly followed by a second one two years later, but only the first was put to use officially, removing the glyphs ⟨ê⟩ and ⟨ô⟩ and allowing Sendinese speakers to spell their unpalatalised pronunciation of words using ⟨l⟩ instead of ⟨lh⟩, among other small changes.

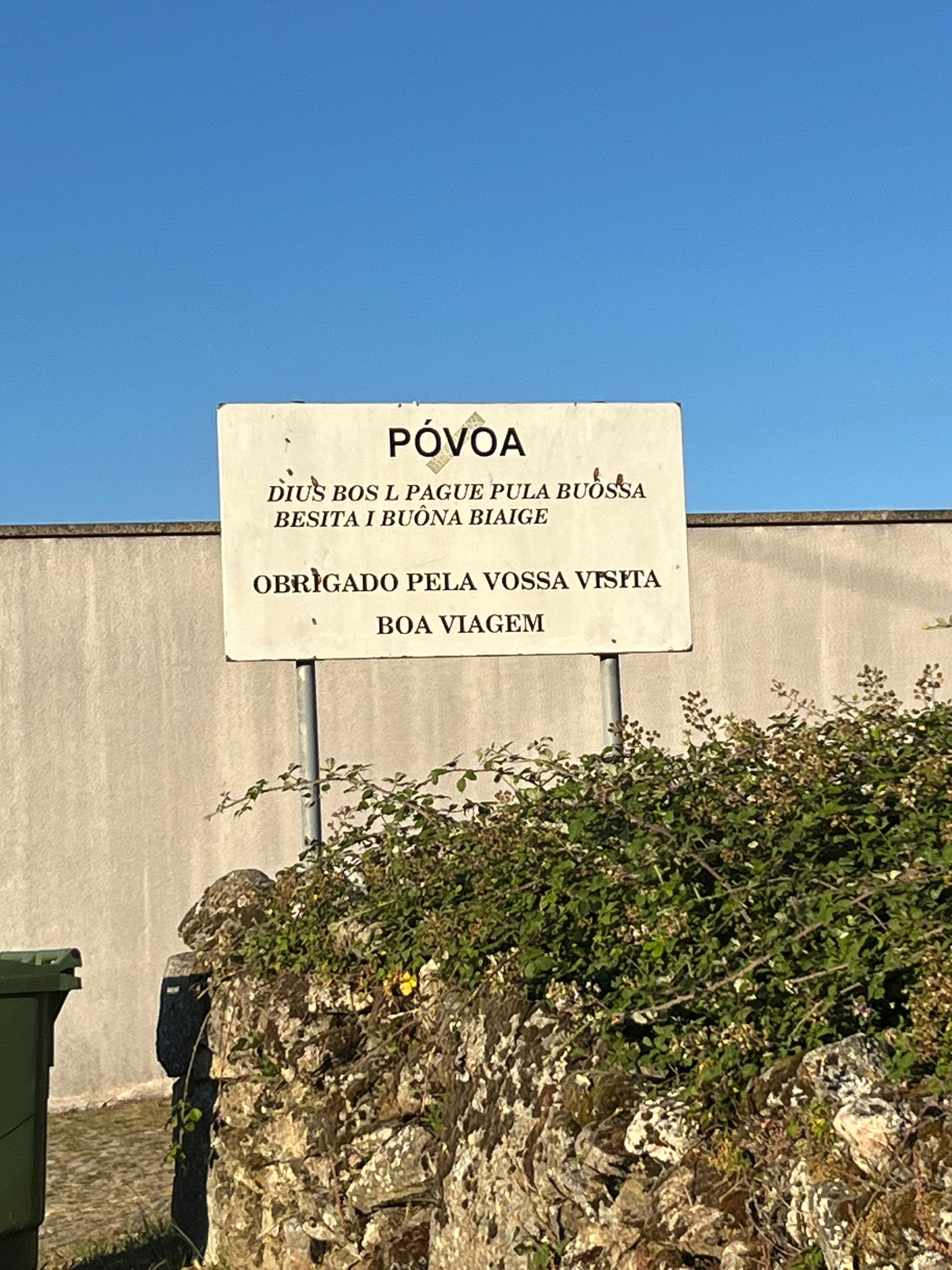
Bilingual sign in the village of Pruoba (Póvoa), with the glyph ⟨ô⟩ used in the superseded orthography; the sign reads Dius bos l pague pula buôssa besita i buôna biaige, or Thank you (lit. 'God bless you') for your visit and bon voyage.

=== Controversy regarding the official orthography ===
When the idea for an official standardised Mirandese orthography was suggested in the late 1990’s, there was a lot of debate as to what to base it on, given Mirandese’s near nonexistent literary history. Many people defended basing Mirandese’s orthography on other Asturleonese varieties (notably Asturian, given its richer literary history), with the usage of ⟨ñ⟩ and ⟨ll⟩ instead of the Portuguese ⟨nh⟩ and ⟨lh⟩ for [ɲ] and [ʎ] respectively, or the usage of ⟨u⟩ instead of ⟨o⟩ for word-final /u/, for example. While others defended basing it on Portuguese’s orthography to aid the older population who was only literate in Portuguese and not have them learn a new set of orthographical rules.

In the end, a mostly Portuguese-based orthography was chosen, but with some alterations to it to still cater to Mirandese’s phonetic inventory.

== Morphology ==
As in Portuguese, Mirandese still uses the following synthetic tenses:

- Synthetic pluperfect in -ra.
- Future subjunctive in -r(e).
- Personal infinitive in -r(e), which has the same endings as the future subjunctive but often differs as the personal infinitive always uses the infinitive stem, whereas the future subjunctive uses the past.

== Influence on Transmontano Portuguese ==
Mirandese was formerly spoken in the general area of the district of Bragança (Bergáncia in Mirandese), that speaks the Transmontano dialect of Portuguese. Although Mirandese has been lost in this region, it left some words and phonetic influences behind.

=== Words used in eastern Trás-os-Montes of (likely) Mirandese origin ===
Portuguese of Campo de Víboras	Mirandese	Rest of Trás-os-Montes/Standard Portuguese	English Translation
alcaforro	alcaforro	abutre	vulture
amalinado	amalinado	adoentado	sick
anubrado	anubrado	nublado	cloudy
assomar	assomar (false friend with Portuguese assomar)	espreitar	to peek
bardeiro	bardeiro	vassoura	broom
betxe	beche (false friend with Portuguese beche)	bode	billy-goat
botxe	boche	bofe	lung (vulgar)
catxo	cacho	bocado	bit
canhona	canhona	ovelha	sheep
carambelo	carambelo	gelo	ice
txafurgo	chafurgo	mergulho	dive
curgidoso	curjidoso	curioso / desenrascado	curious / resourceful
d'apeto	(d')apeto	de propósito	on purpose
desinjum	zinjun	pequeno-almoço / desjejum (rare)	breakfast
emantes	mentes	enquanto	while
(ele) fai	(el) fai	(ele) faz	(he) does
forfalha	forfalha	migalha	crumb
guitxo	guicho	esperto / alerta	smart / alert
ai	hai	há	there is
scuma	scuma	espuma / escuma (archaic)	foam

== Sample text ==
The following is a sample text of the Mirandese language, written by Amadeu Ferreira and published in the newspaper Público on 24 July 2007.

Mirandese	Portuguese	English
Muitas lhénguas ténen proua de ls sous pergaminos antigos, de la lhiteratura screbida hai cientos d'anhos i de scritores hai muito afamados, hoije bandeiras dessas lhénguas. Mas outras hai que nun puoden tener proua de nada desso, cumo ye l causo de la lhéngua mirandesa.	Muitas línguas têm orgulho dos seus pergaminhos antigos, da literatura escrita há centenas de anos e de escritores muito famosos, hoje bandeiras dessas línguas. Mas há outras que não podem ter orgulho de nada disso, como é o caso da língua mirandesa.	Many languages take pride in their ancient scrolls, their centuries-old literature, and in famous writers, today standards of those languages. But there are others which can't boast of any of this, as in the case of Mirandese.

Then a comparison of the previous text in three modern languages of the Asturoleonese group:

Mirandese	Leonese	Asturian
Muitas lhénguas ténen proua de ls sous pergaminos antigos, de la lhiteratura screbida hai cientos d'anhos i de scritores hai muito afamados, hoije bandeiras dessas lhénguas. Mas outras hai que nun puoden tener proua de nada desso, cumo ye l causo de la lhéngua mirandesa.	Muitas llinguas tien arguyu de los sous pergaminos antiguos, de la lliteratura escrita van cientos d'annos y d'escritores bien famosos; guei bandeiras d'eisas llinguas. Peru hai outras que nun pueden tener arguyu de nada d'eisu, cumu ye'l casu de la llingua mirandesa.	Munches llingües tienen arguyu de los sos pergaminos antiguos, de la lliteratura escrita hai cientos d'años y d'escritores enforma famosos, güei banderes d'eses llingües. Pero hai otres que nun pueden tener arguyu de nada d'eso, como ye'l casu de la llingua mirandesa.

== Comparative table ==
Latin	Mirandese	Leonese	Central Asturian	Montañés Cantabrian	Pasiegu Cantabrian	Extremaduran	Portuguese	Galician	Fala	Spanish	Aragonese	Catalan	Gascon	English
altus	alto	altu	altu	altu	altu	artu	alto	alto	altu/cirulalgu, firulalgu	alto	alto	alt	haut	high/tall
quasi	quaije/quaisque	cuasi	cuasi, cuásique	cuasi	casi	cuasi, abati	quase	case	caishi/cashi/casi/cuashi/cuasi	casi	cuasi	quasi	quasi	almost
dicere	dezir	dicire	dicir	dicir/icir	dicer/dicir/icir	izil	dizer	dicir	idil/idel	decir	decir	dir	díser	to say
facere	fazer	facere	facer	ḥacer	hacel	hazel	fazer	facer	fel/ficel	hacer	fer	fer	har	to do
focus	fuogo	fue(g)u/fuo(g)u	fuebu/fueu	ḥueu	ḥuigu/ḥuegu	hueu	fogo	fogo	fogu	fuego	fuego	foc	huec	fire
flamma	chama	chama	llama	llapa	llama	flama	chama	chama	chama	llama	flama	flama	ehlama	flame
legere	lher (Sendinese: lher)	lliere	lleer	leer	leyer	leel	ler	ler	leel/lel	leer	leyer	llegir	léger	to read
lingua	lhéngua (Sendinese: léngua)	llingua	llingua/llengua	lengua	lengua	luenga/léngua	língua	lingua	lengua	lengua	luenga	llengua	lengua	tongue/language
lumbum	lhombo (Sendinese: lombo)	llombu	llombu	lombu/llombu	lumu/lomu	lombu	lombo	lombo	lombu/lomu	lomo	lomo	llom	lom	loin
mater	mai/madre	mai	ma	madre	madri	mairi	mãe	nai/mai	madri/mairi	madre	mai	mare	mair	mother
merula	mierlo/mielro	mielru	ñarbatu/mierbu	miruellu	miruilu	mielru	melro	merlo		mirlo	merla	merla	mèrlo	blackbird
monstrare	amostrar	amosare	amostrar	amostrar	mostrar	muestral	mostrar	mostrar	mostral	mostrar	amostrar	mostrar	muishar	to show
noster	nuosso	nuesu/nuosu	nuestru	nuestru	muistru	muestru/nuestru	nosso	noso	nosu	nuestro	nuestro	nostre	noste	ours
tussis	tuosse	tose	tose/tos	tus	tus	tossi	tosse	tose	tosi	tos	tos	tos	tos	cough

== See also ==
- Mirandese people
- Asturian language
- Extremaduran language
- Leonese language
- Cantabrian dialect

== Sources ==
- Ferreira, Manuela Barros; Raposo, Domingos, eds. (1999). Convenção Ortográfica da Língua Mirandesa [Orthographic Convention for Mirandese Language] (PDF) (in Portuguese). Miranda do Douro and Lisboa: Câmara Municipal de Miranda do Douro and Centro de Linguística da Universidade de Lisboa. Archived from the original (PDF) on 29 June 2003.
