= Bragança District =

District of Portugal

District of Bragança Distrito de Bragança (Portuguese) Çtrito de Bergáncia (Mirandese) Distritu de Bergancia (Leonese)
- District
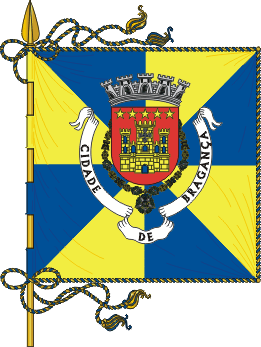
- Flag Coat of arms

- The location of the District of Bragança within continental Portugal
- Country: Portugal
- Region: Norte
- Subregion: Alto Trás-os-Montes
- Historical Province: Trás-os-Montes e Alto Douro
- District: Bragança
- Municipalities: Alfândega da Fé, Bragança, Carrazeda de Ansiães, Freixo de Espada à Cinta, Macedo de Cavaleiros, Miranda do Douro, Mirandela, Mogadouro, Moncorvo, Vila Flor, Vimioso, Vinhais

Government
  - Civil Governor: Jorge Manuel Nogueiro Gomes

Population (2011)
  - Total: 136,252
- Time zone: UTC0 (WET)
  - Summer (DST): UTC+1 (WEST)
- Area code: (+351) 273 XXX XXX
- ccTLD: .pt
- Currency: Euro (€)
- Statistics from INE (2001); geographic detail from Instituto Geográfico Português (2010)

Bragança District (Portuguese: Distrito de Bragança [bɾɐˈɣɐ̃sɐ]; Mirandese: Çtrito de Bergáncia Mirandese pronunciation: [bəɾˈɣãsja]; Leonese: Distritu de Bergancia Leonese pronunciation: [biɾˈɣã.s̻jɐ]) is a traditional political division of Portugal, in the northeast corner bordering on Spain (Castile and Leon and Galicia), covering 7.4% of the nation's continental landmass. As of the 2011 census the total resident population was 136,252, making it the second-least populous district in Portugal, only surpassing Portalegre District.

Bragança is administratively divided in twelve municipalities and 226 parishes located in the north-eastern part of Trás-os-Montes. The capital of the district, Bragança, is 217 kilometres (135 mi) from Porto, the second largest town in Portugal, 107 kilometres (66 mi) from the Spanish town of Zamora and 169 kilometres (105 mi) from Salamanca, also in Spain. It is bordered by Spain (Castile and Leon and Galicia) in the north and northeast, Vila Real District in the west, Viseu District in the southwest and Guarda District in the south.

== History ==
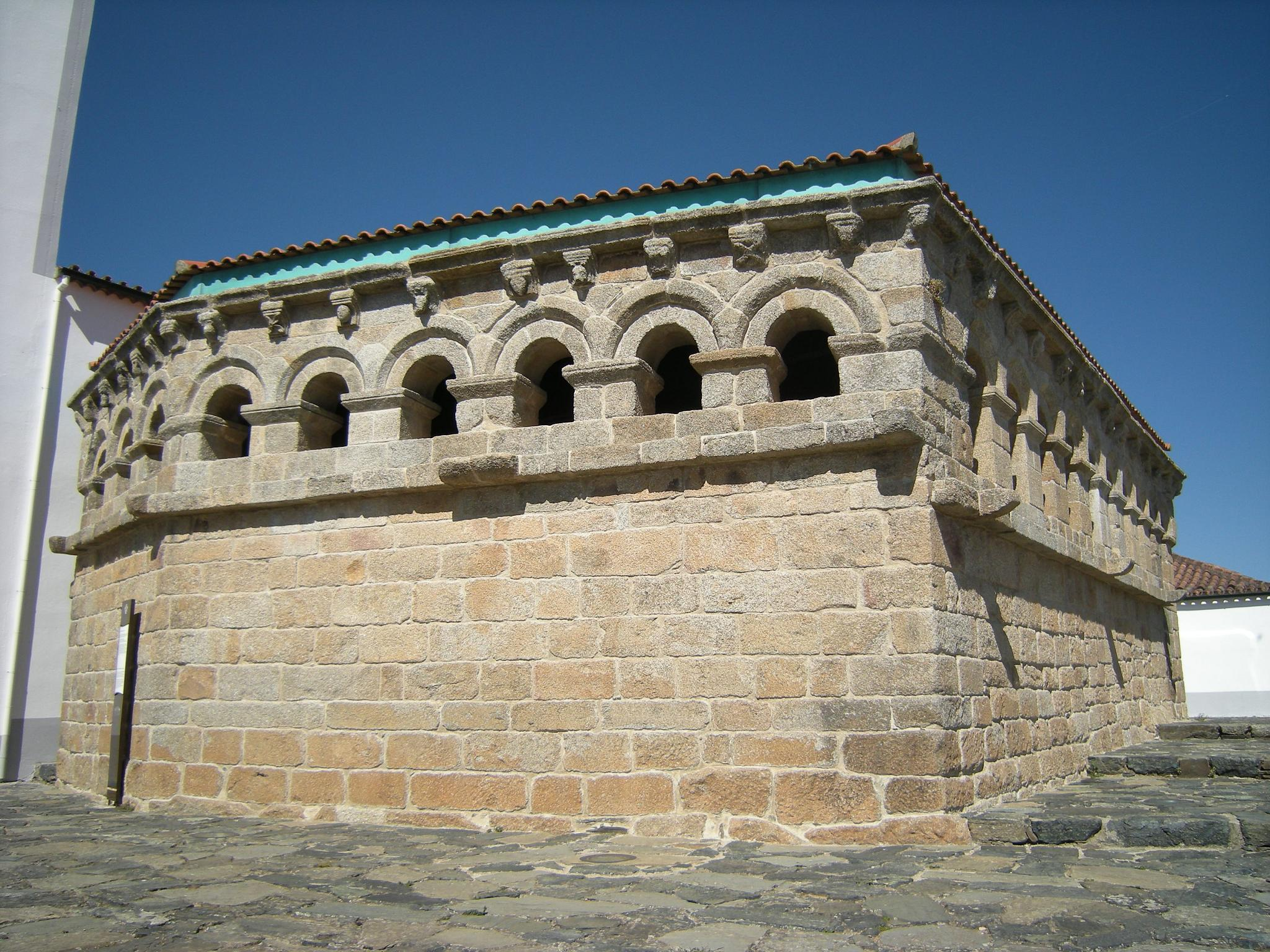
The ancient Domus Municipalis in the Roman civitas of Brigantia was the base of organized settlement

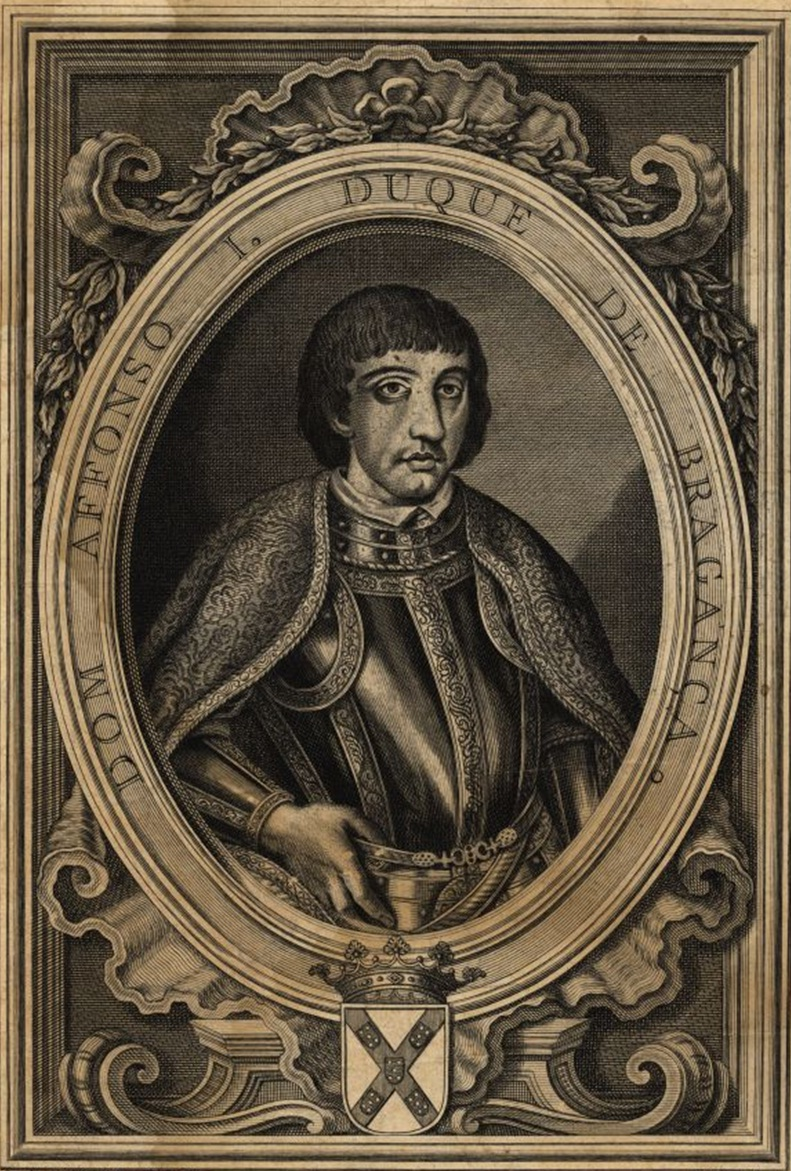
Afonso, first Duke of Braganza, whose Dukedom developed from the Braganção family lands established in Castro de Avelãs

During the Roman era, the territory was part of the much larger province of Gallaecia, dependent administratively on Astorga and the gold, iron and silver trade route. Although names similar to Bragança appeared around 666 B.C. (Wamba) or 569 A.D. (Council of Lugo), a territory identifiable as Bragança only appeared after the Celts who baptised one of their main settlements Brigantia, in the second century, which was later Latinized to Bragança. But this settlement was limited.

The region's name was derived from the traditional feudal history of the northern region: the Bragançãos family of Castro de Avelãs were the basis of this lineage that included Fernão Mendes, who later married the Infanta Sancha (daughter of Afonso Henriques), inheriting the region on the death of the King. The Bragançãos would maintain their hold on the region until 1258, when Afonso III transferred the title to Nuno Martins, but the name Braganção would continue to influence the region. Eventually, the King Afonso V established the Dukedom of the Duchy of Braganza for his uncle, Afonso, Count of Barcelos to strengthen the ties of the crown to the land. When the royal House of Braganza ascended to the throne of Portugal (through John IV), the significance of Bragança, as the hereditary seat of the Kings and Emperors of Portugal was sealed.

The district of Bragança was constituted upon the creation of the district system on 25 April 1835; a creation of the Liberal government, it was inspired by the French départements, with the objective to "facilitate the action of government...and permit access to the authorities". The establishment of the districts was primarily done to counteract the centralizing tendencies of the governmental authority.

== Geography ==
=== Physical geography ===
The district is composed of two distinct regions described in terms of its geographic differences: the northern areas, with the higher altitudes constitute the Terra Fria Transmontana (Cold lands), and the Alto Trás-os-Montes, where the landscape is dominated gentler slopes of the plateau; and the southern areas, the Terra Quente Trasmontana (Hot Lands), where the climate is milder, marked by the valleys of the Douro River and its tributaries. Its area allows a wide diversity of landscapes, and the district is known for its climatic differences (nine months of winter and three of heat), its rugged geomorphology, an aging population and urban to rural migration of its residents over time.

It is the Douro River that characterizes the geography, dividing the borders within the district, its southern frontier and extreme northeast borders with Spain. It is in the Douro valley that the lowlands of the district are primarily located, although almost all are 400 metres above sea level, with the exception of the municipality of Mirandela and its rivers. In addition to the Douro, the rivers of the district run north to south (or northeast to southwest) within the Douro watershed. The principal rivers are the Tua River, which springs from the mountains of Mirandela, at the confluence of Tuela and Rabaçal Rivers, and the Sabor River, which springs in Spain, and crosses the eastern part of the district. Both rivers have a network of tributaries, such as the Baceiro River (feeding the Tuela), the Mente River (serving the Rabaçal), and the Azibo River (supporting the Sabor).

The mountain ranges divide these water courses: the Serra da Nogueira (approximately 1320 metres) separates the Tuela and Sabor valleys; more to the south, the Serra de Bornes (1199 metres), in the municipalities of Macedo de Cavaleiros and Alfândega da Fé separate the Tua and Sabor Rivers; to the east, the columns of the Serra do Mogadouro (997 metres) separate the Sabor and Douro; and in the north, at the border with Spain, the largest mountains in the region the Serra da Coroa (1274 metres), north of Vinhais, and the Serra de Montesinho (1400 metres) at the frontier, shield the Spanish autonomous communities from Portugal. A major part of the dams in the district are located along the Douro; the Valeira, Pocinho, Saucelle, Aldeadávila, Bemposta, Picote and Miranda Dams, along the main river, and the Azibo, Nuzedo de Baixo and Rebordelo, along its tributaries.

==== Ecoregions/protected areas ====
Bragança includes several natural sanctuaries, such as the Parque Natural de Montesinho, the Parque Natural do Douro Internacional, and the Paisagem Protegida da Albufeira do Azibo, oasises in the northwest part of the Iberian Peninsula.

=== Human geography ===
Consisting of twelve municipalities, the district of Bragança is the fifth largest district of Portugal:

- Alfândega da Fé
- Bragança
- Carrazeda de Ansiães
- Freixo de Espada à Cinta
- Macedo de Cavaleiros
- Miranda do Douro
- Mirandela
- Mogadouro
- Torre de Moncorvo
- Vila Flor
- Vimioso
- Vinhais

== Politics ==
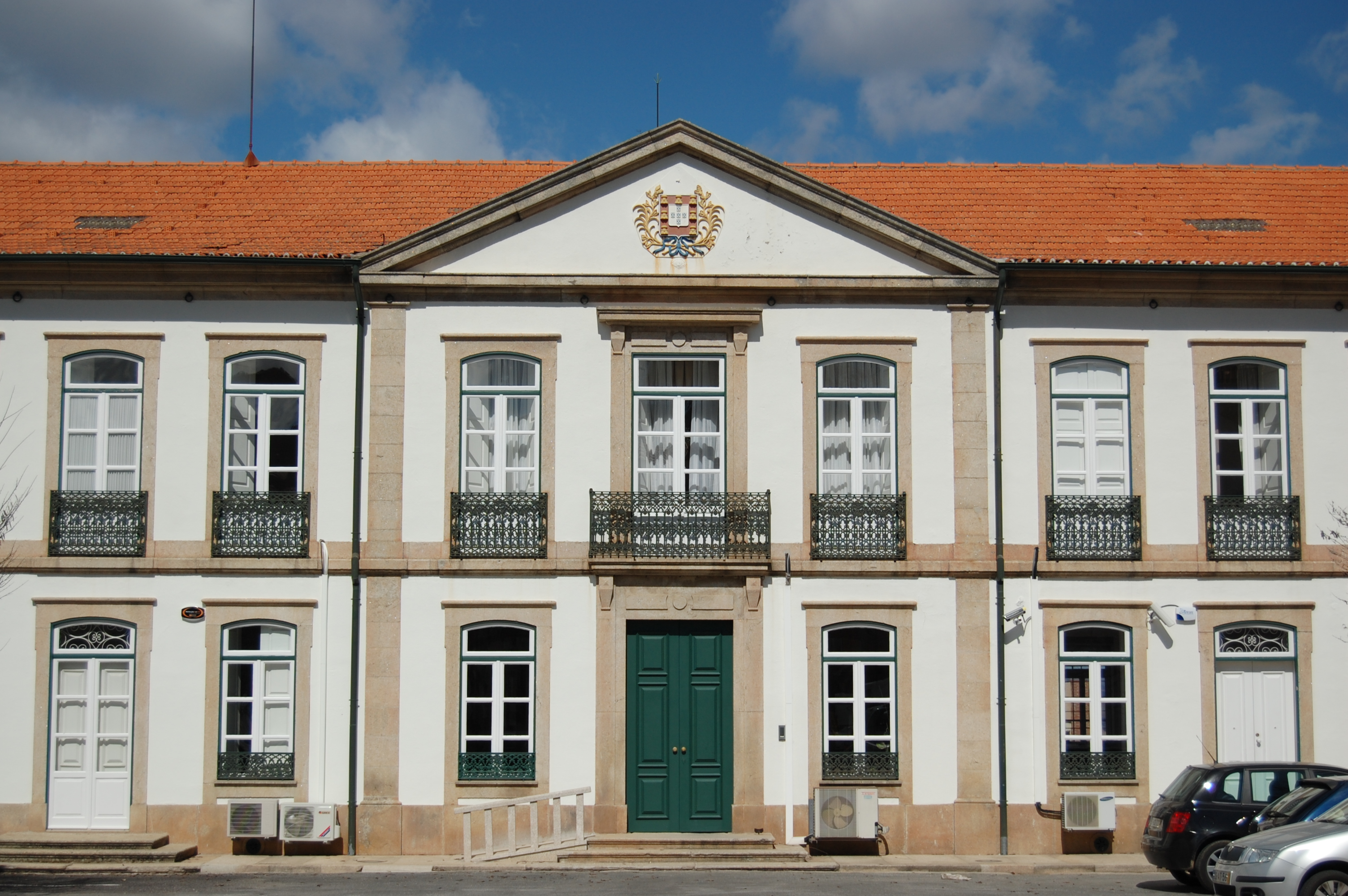
Civil Governor's residence in the district seat of Bragança

One of 18 Portuguese districts, this administrative division serves to define electoral units for proportional representation in national elections; administrative centres for police, courts and other public orders; and some local offices of ministries. Although Bragança has a Civil Governor, nominated by the Ministry of Home Affairs (Portuguese: Ministro da Administração Interna), his/her role is limited to issues of public security, and local governance.

=== Summary of votes and seats won 1976-2022 ===
Summary of election results from the district of Bragança, 1976–2022
Parties	%	S	%	S	%	S	%	S	%	S	%	S	%	S	%	S	%	S	%	S	%	S	%	S	%	S	%	S	%	S	%	S
Parties	1976		1979		1980		1983		1985		1987		1991		1995		1999		2002		2005		2009		2011		2015		2019		2022	
PS	22.6	1	22.2	1	21.3	1	30.4	1	22.7	1	19.2	1	25.7	1	40.3	2	39.7	2	30.0	1	42.1	2	33.0	1	26.1	1	34.1	1	36.5	1	40.3	2
PSD	33.3	2	In AD				35.8	2	39.2	2	60.8	3	57.9	3	44.8	2	45.1	2	53.2	3	39.0	2	40.6	2	52.1	2	In PàF		40.8	2	40.3	1
CDS-PP	28.3	2	In AD				20.9	1	17.1	1	7.6		8.2		9.3		8.6		10.9		9.7		12.6		11.1		In PàF		4.5		2.1	
AD			60.7	3	65.3	3																										
PàF																											49.4	2				
Total seats	5		4																				3									
Source: Comissão Nacional de Eleições

== Economy ==
The region is known for its small (almost subsistence) agriculture, supported by various species of free-range cattle and traditional agricultural techniques. Local gastronomy, which includes Mirandês beef, embutidos, lamb, sheep and poultry, cascas com casulos, trout, bread, cheese and honey, as well as a range of sweets and pastries, are rich representations of this zone. Unlike tourism in central Portugal, the region is sought for its unspoiled nature and rural tourism; its agrarian lifestyle, although an important part of its enchantment, supports the local population, primarily in cattle-raising, dairy production and cultivation of rye and wheat.

In the urban areas, particularly the municipal seats, the primary economic activities predominate, including the public-sector institutions, commerce and industry.

The difficulty in communication and interconnection between markets was always a problem in this region, resulting in few investments and economic development. Tourism still remains the sector of the economy that has potential to improve development, and fix a transient population.

== Culture ==
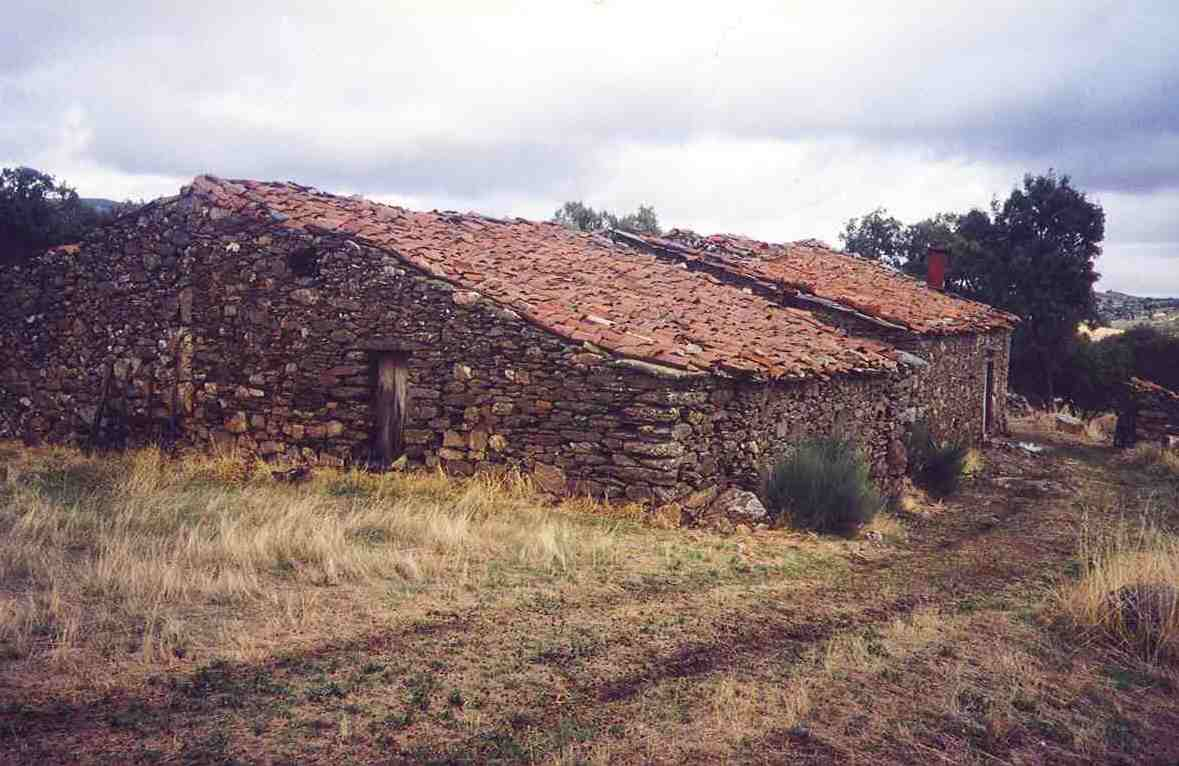
A stone home from the 17th century in the municipality of Mogadouro

Leonese language was widely spoken in the territory, but today, there are few who speak the language (which is primarily concentrated in the communities near Rio de Onor, Guadramil and along the northeast to southeast frontier with Spain). Mirandese, a local variant, is commonly observed in the regions of the District, particularly around Miranda do Douro, and has resulted in its official recognition by the Portuguese Parliament.

== See also ==
- Rio de Fornos, a village in the district of Bragança
