= Alfaião =

- Civil parish
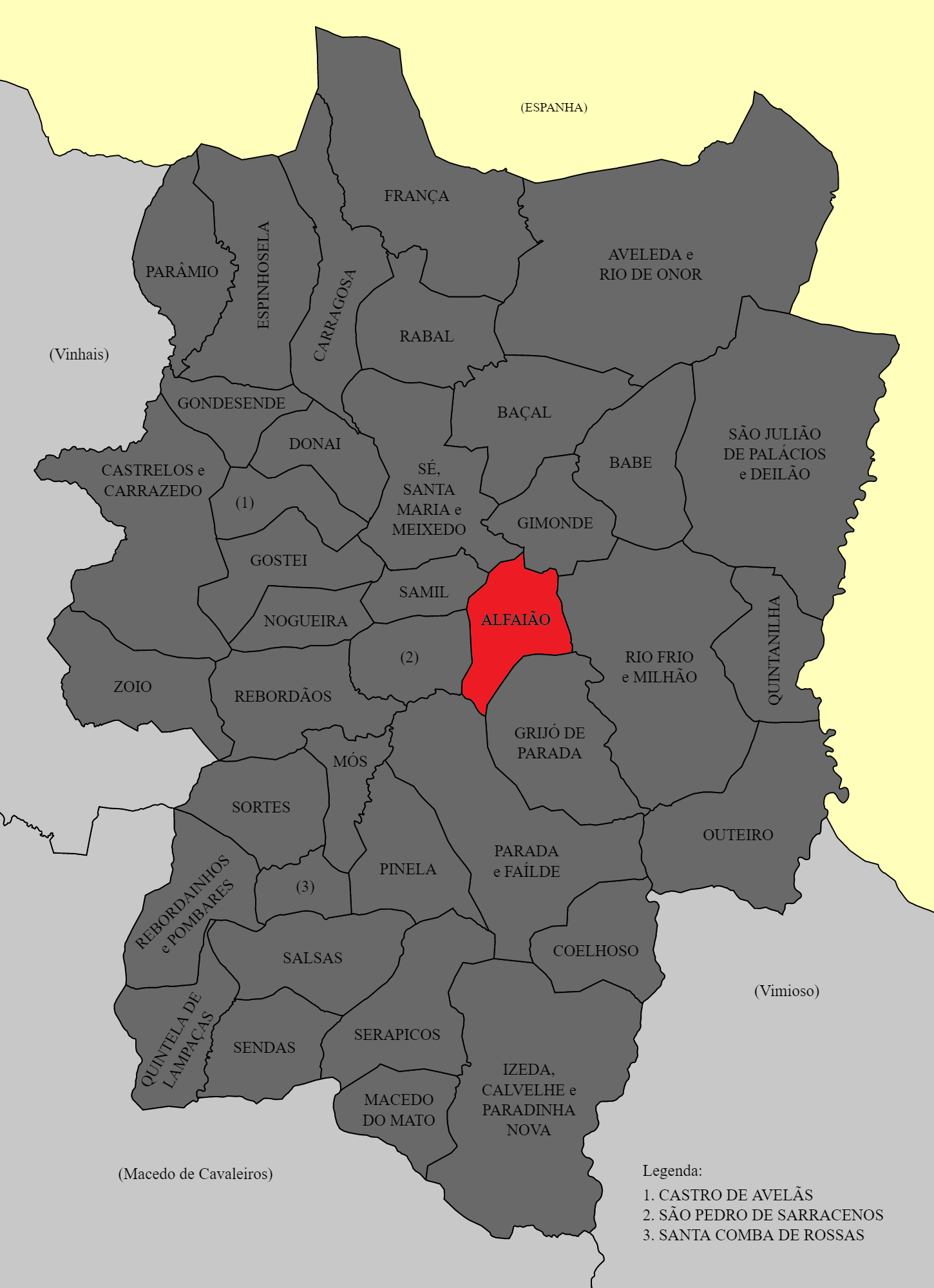
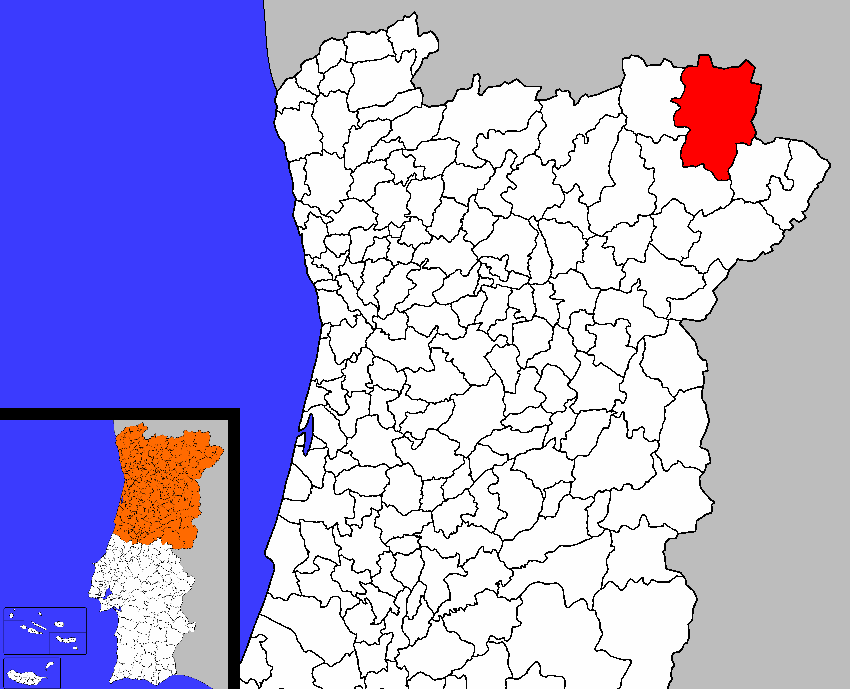
- Coordinates: 41.763°N 6.727°W
- Country: Portugal
- Region: Norte
- Intermunic. comm.: Terras de Trás-os-Montes
- District: Bragança
- Municipality: Bragança

Area
  - Total: 17.58 km^{2} (6.79 sq mi)
- Elevation: 521 m (1,709 ft)

Population (2011)
  - Total: 173
  - Density: 9.84/km^{2} (25.5/sq mi)
- Time zone: UTC+00:00 (WET)
  - Summer (DST): UTC+01:00 (WEST)
- Postal code: 5300
- Area code: 273
- Patron: São Martinho

Alfaião is a Portuguese civil parish in the municipality of Bragança. The population in 2011 was 173, in an area of 17.58 km^{2} (6.79 sq mi).

== History ==
Located in the central part of the municipality of Bragança, it was located a dozen of kilometres southeast of the Roman castro of Brigantina. The settlement had its beginnings in a local castro that existed during the Iron Age. In 1758, metallic objects were discovered in the remnants of a building, referred to as the castle by the locals. A later historian suggested that the castle was of Roman origin, owing to the discovery of old military implements from that period. The same author also alluded to a second fortification "in top of the mountain...there was an old ancient Castle, and it can still be seen the bowls used there..." Similar references were echoed by the Abbot of Baçal (and other investors), who confirmed the existence of two different settlements in Alfaião: Castelo das Freiras and Alto da Veiga (or also Vale de Castro.

Few references to Alfaião's founding exist, and the parish was only mentioned in documents during the middle of the 13th century. One of the records date back to the Inquirições (administrative inventory) of 1258 ordered by Afonso III include a reference to a "parrochia Sancti Martini de Alfayãa", in the lands near Bragança. Further references are sketchy, indicating that during the reign of King Sancho I the parishioners of Alfaião developed their community in parallel with the growth and establishment of Bragança. After the creation of the bishopric of Miranda do Douro, the local Church of São Martinho fell within the authority of that church, until the diocese was extinguished and the clergy transferred to the Sé in Bragnaça. At the time it had 70 inhabitants.

The parish had its own local magistrate, subordinate to the superior judges and government of the city of Bragança by 1775. The local community had no local postal authority, and a visitor from the University in Coimbra referred to a community of less than 30 homes.

== Geography ==
The topography in this region is planar, with hilltops oscillating between 500 and 750 metres high. The rapids of the Sabor River cut across the southern portion of the parish.

Owing to its distance from Bragança, its demographic level has declined since the middle of the 20th century, when at the time its population hovered around 331 inhabitants.

It is connected primarily across the EN217 (Bragança-Izeda-Mogadouro corridor) and rural road (by way of São Pedro de Sarracenos) to the municipal seat.

== Architecture ==
- Church of São Martinho (Portuguese: Igreja Paroquial de Alfaião/Igreja de São Martinho), located in the middle of the main village, the parochial church includes two minor altars (with images of Nossa Senhora do Rosário and Nosso Senhor Crucificado) and a main altar (with an image of its patron saint São Martinho); the ecclesiastical parish of Alfaião pertained to the Monastery of Castro de Avelãs since 1490, the archbishop of Braga assigning the abbot at the time; between 1501 and 1514, its clergy were served from the monastery; the construction of the current church occurred in the 17th century; the first baptisms were registered in 1627; the first marriage was documented in 1628; in 1706, its second parish priest Father Carvalho da Costa, who was assigned by a canon at the Sé Church in Miranda, earned 150$000 réis, the parish included 66 neighbours; the first death was recorded in 1724; by 21 April 1758, the parish which was located between two mounts and pertained to the bishop of Miranda do Douro, comarca and seat of Bragança, and was subject to the House of Braganza. The church was considered "indecent and incapable" by a visiting vicar from the university, and reconstruction/remodelling works were begun in 1775, in order to enlarge the main chapel, create a new sacristy and parochial residences (which were in ruins and located half a league from the church). The parish holdings produced 15 alqueires of corn annually, but the university covered the tithes, as well as providing a stipend of 8$000 réis, candlewax, wine, hosts, repairs to the main chapel, sacristy and residences of the pastor (in addition to 16 alqueires of bread and $180 réis that covered the archdeacon). In 1798 a new image of Saint Martin was commissioned by a local benefactor.
- Chapel of Nossa Senhora da Veiga (Portuguese: Capela de Nossa Senhora da Veiga), the first reference to this chapel, came from abbot João de Loureiro Medeiros (21 Abril 1758), who mentioned that it was dedicated to Nossa Senhora da Encarnação (Our Lady of the Incarnation), situated in this place called Veiga; the local religious brotherhood celebrated a festival on 25 March, with a sermon and procession; on 25 April by the locals; and it was believed that the patron saint granted miracles to the faithful, resulting in an annual pilgrimage to the small chapel.
- Chapel of São Sebastião (Portuguese: Capela de São Sebastião), a chapel administered by the clergy at the Sé of Miranda do Douro; the abbot João de Loureiro Medeiros identified chapel to Saint Sebastian, which existed outside of Alfaião, on the road leading to Bragança;
