= Babe (Bragança) =

- Civil parish
- Location in Portugal
- Coordinates: 41.830°N 6.651°W
- Country: Portugal
- Region: Norte
- Intermunic. comm.: Terras de Trás-os-Montes
- District: Bragança
- Municipality: Bragança

Area
  - Total: 25.62 km^{2} (9.89 sq mi)
- Elevation: 798 m (2,618 ft)

Population (2011)
  - Total: 238
  - Density: 9.3/km^{2} (24/sq mi)
- Time zone: UTC+00:00 (WET)
  - Summer (DST): UTC+01:00 (WEST)
- Postal code: 5300
- Area code: 273
- Patron: São Pedro

Babe is a Portuguese civil parish in the municipality of Bragança. The population in 2011 was 238, in an area of 25.62 km^{2}.

== History ==
A. Pereira Lopo, writing in 1898, alludes to the greatness of the Castro of Babe, which had been an important station during the Roman era. This includes many monuments located in its shadow, including altar stone dedicated to Jupiter (with the inscription "I.O.M.") and funerary stone ("A1 e EQVITIAL (ae) II") with vestiges of three figures in low relief.

It was situated on the Roman road from Braga to Castile. Remains of the Roman settlement can be found in funerary crypts and Bronze Age implements. Popular tradition suggests that a road was built for Elizabeth of Portugal to pass through or beside the village.

There is no consensus about the origin of the name Babe. Some suggest Arabic: باب, which means [small] door (Portuguese: portinha). Others suggest that the name originated from the Roman era.

The modern parish of Babe, dates to the medieval period, when it was referred to as Sancti Petride Babi, which it would continue to remain until the 13th-century Inquirições of King Afonso III. The documents associated with the King's inventory are the first records of a parochial institution (1258), although it is likely that the local church had existed prior to these records. The church dedicated to São Pedro (Portuguese: Saint Peter), which, already on the decline, was substituted by the new Church of Santa Maria de Laviados, later to the invocation of Nossa Senhora da Conceição.

The Treaty of Babe, between John I of Portugal and John of Gaunt, the Duke of Lancaster, was signed here on 26 March 1387.

Babe's evolution has been affected by the population emigration and aging of the community.

== Geography ==
Situated 10.5 kilometres from the municipal seat of Bragança, Babe occupies an area accessible by the EN218, or along the EN308 from Gimonde. It is located on the southern portion of the Montesinho Natural Park (Portuguese: Parque Natural de Montesinho, a mountainous plateau along the border between Spain and northern Portugal. At an average altitude of 750 metres, it is crossed by the Igrejas River and many of its tributaries.

The parish is bordered by Gimonde, Palácios, Caravela, São Julião and Laviados.

== Architecture ==
=== Civic ===
- Fountains of Babe (Portuguese: Fontes em Babe).

=== Religious ===
- Church of São Pedro (Portuguese: Igreja Matriz de Babe/Igreja de São Pedro). From 1258, most of the town belonged to the Hospitaller Order, under the Monastery of Castro de Avelãs since 1258. Only in the 17th century was a church built, supported in subsequent years by patronage from hereditary nobles, including the Dukes of Braganza. The plain single-nave church, in the Manueline style had two side altars, one dedicated to Nossa Senhora do Rosário, the other to the Souls of Purgatory (supported by the Confraternity of Souls (Portuguese: Irmandade das Almas);
- Chapel of São Sebastião (Portuguese: Capela de São Sebastião). The first reference to this chapel is by the rector José Alvares da Silva on 17 April 1758.
- Chapel of São José (Portuguese: Capela de São José), dating back to 1697 (from an inscription on the façade).
