= Santa Comba de Rossas =

- Civil parish
- Location in Portugal
- Coordinates: 41.665°N 6.831°W
- Country: Portugal
- Region: Norte
- Intermunic. comm.: Terras de Trás-os-Montes
- District: Bragança
- Municipality: Bragança

Area
  - Total: 8.75 km^{2} (3.38 sq mi)

Population (2011)
  - Total: 304
  - Density: 34.7/km^{2} (90.0/sq mi)
- Time zone: UTC+00:00 (WET)
  - Summer (DST): UTC+01:00 (WEST)

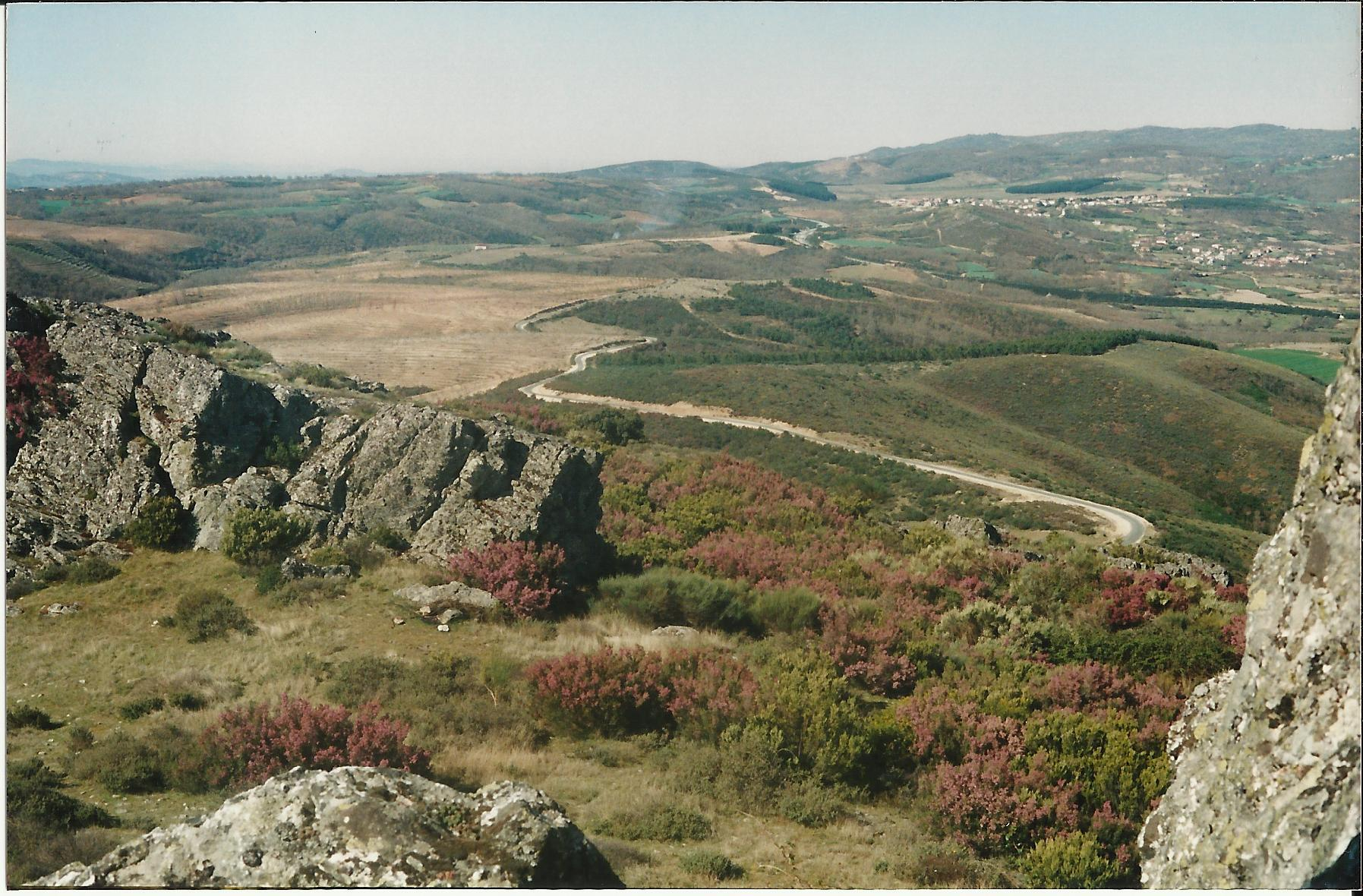

Santa Comba de Rossas is a civil parish in the municipality of Bragança, Portugal. The population in 2011 was 304, in an area of 8.75 km^{2} (3.38 sq mi).
