= França (Bragança) =

- Civil parish
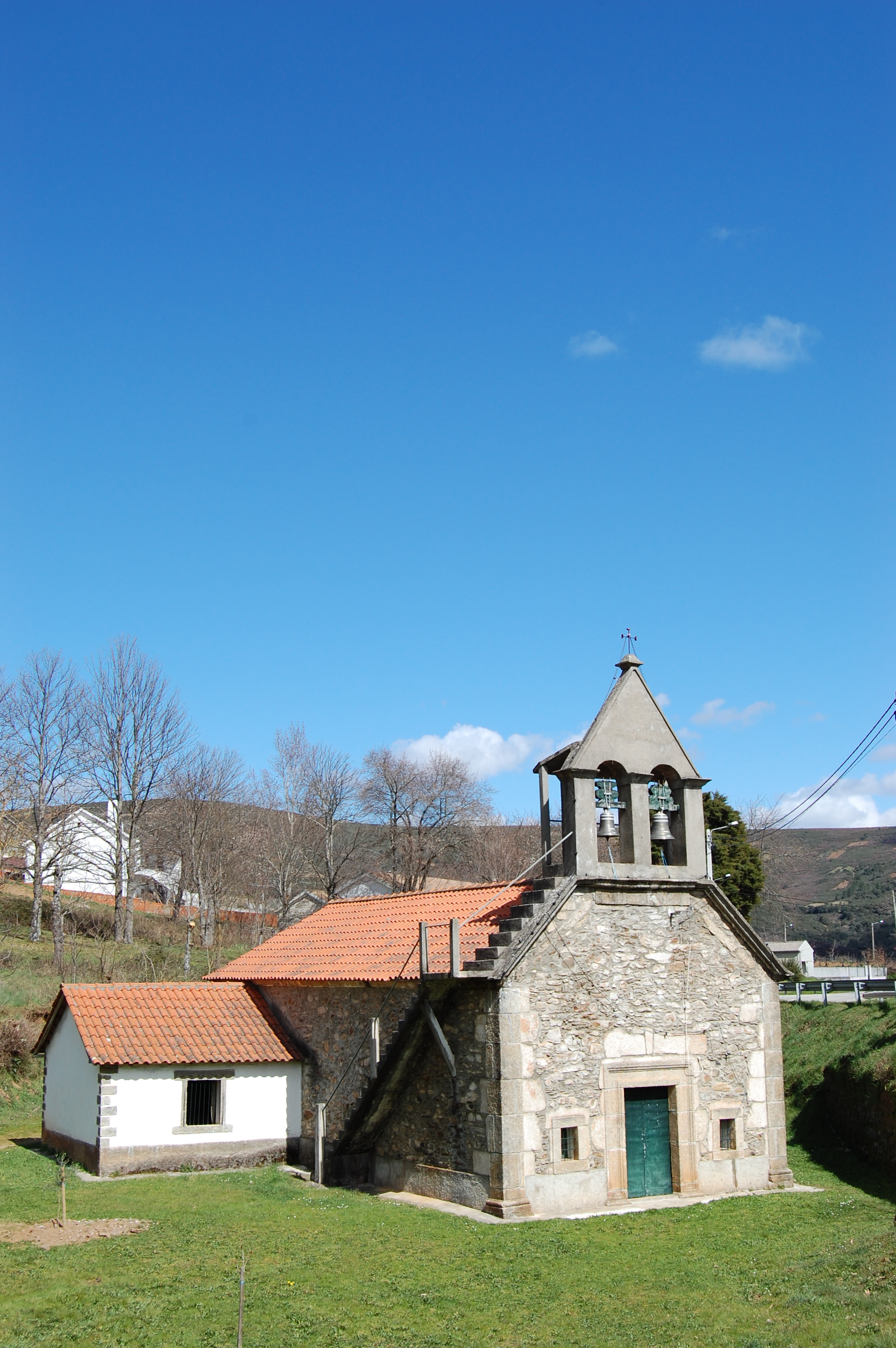
- Chapel of Nossa Senhora da Ponte

- Location in Portugal
- Coordinates: 41.901°N 6.739°W
- Country: Portugal
- Region: Norte
- Intermunic. comm.: Terras de Trás-os-Montes
- District: Bragança
- Municipality: Bragança

Area
  - Total: 53.71 km^{2} (20.74 sq mi)

Population (2011)
  - Total: 238
  - Density: 4.43/km^{2} (11.5/sq mi)
- Time zone: UTC+00:00 (WET)
  - Summer (DST): UTC+01:00 (WEST)

França is a civil parish in the municipality of Bragança, Portugal. The population in 2011 was 238, in an area of 53.71 km^{2}.

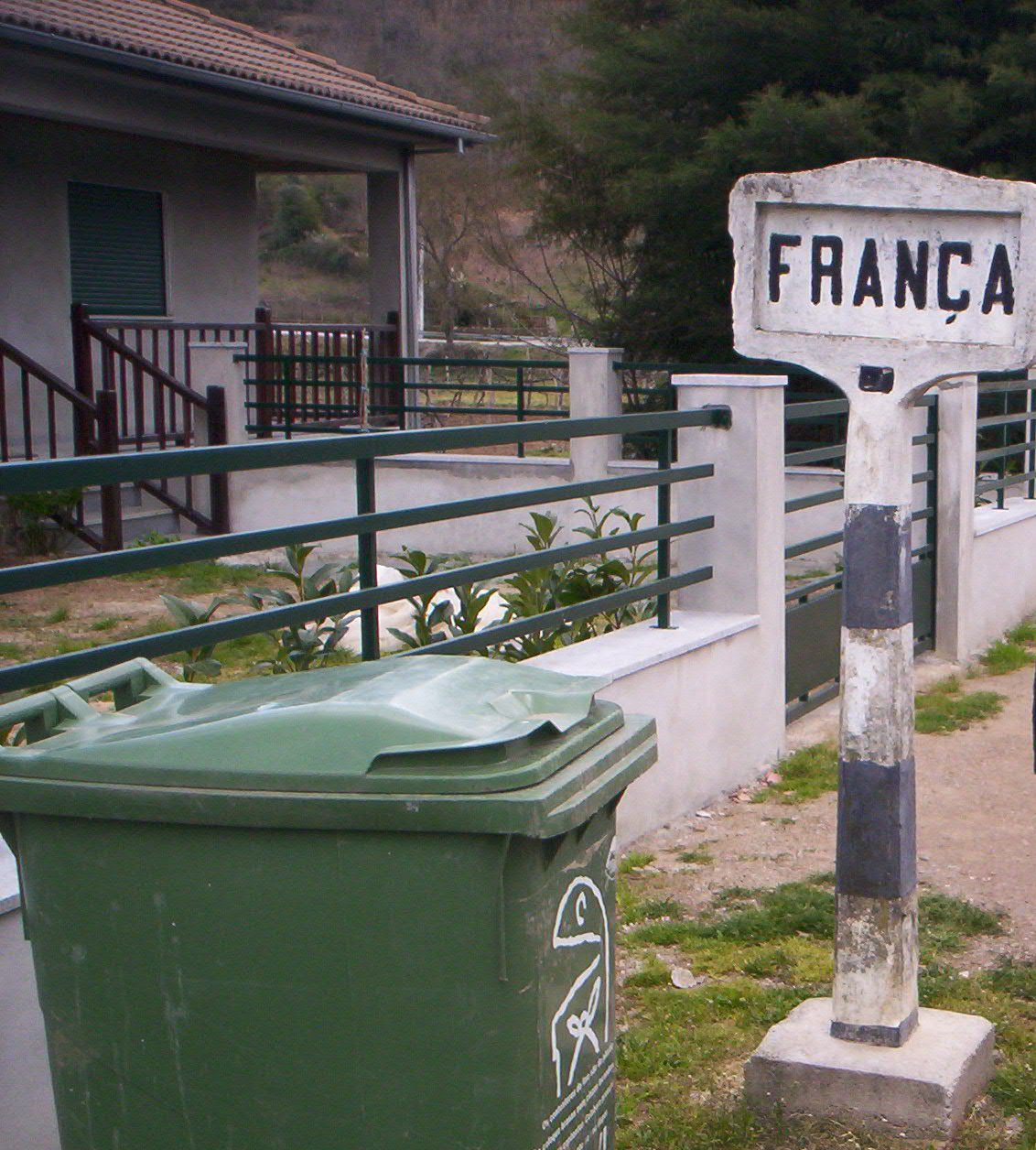
Road sign when arriving in França
