= Macedo do Mato =

- Civil parish
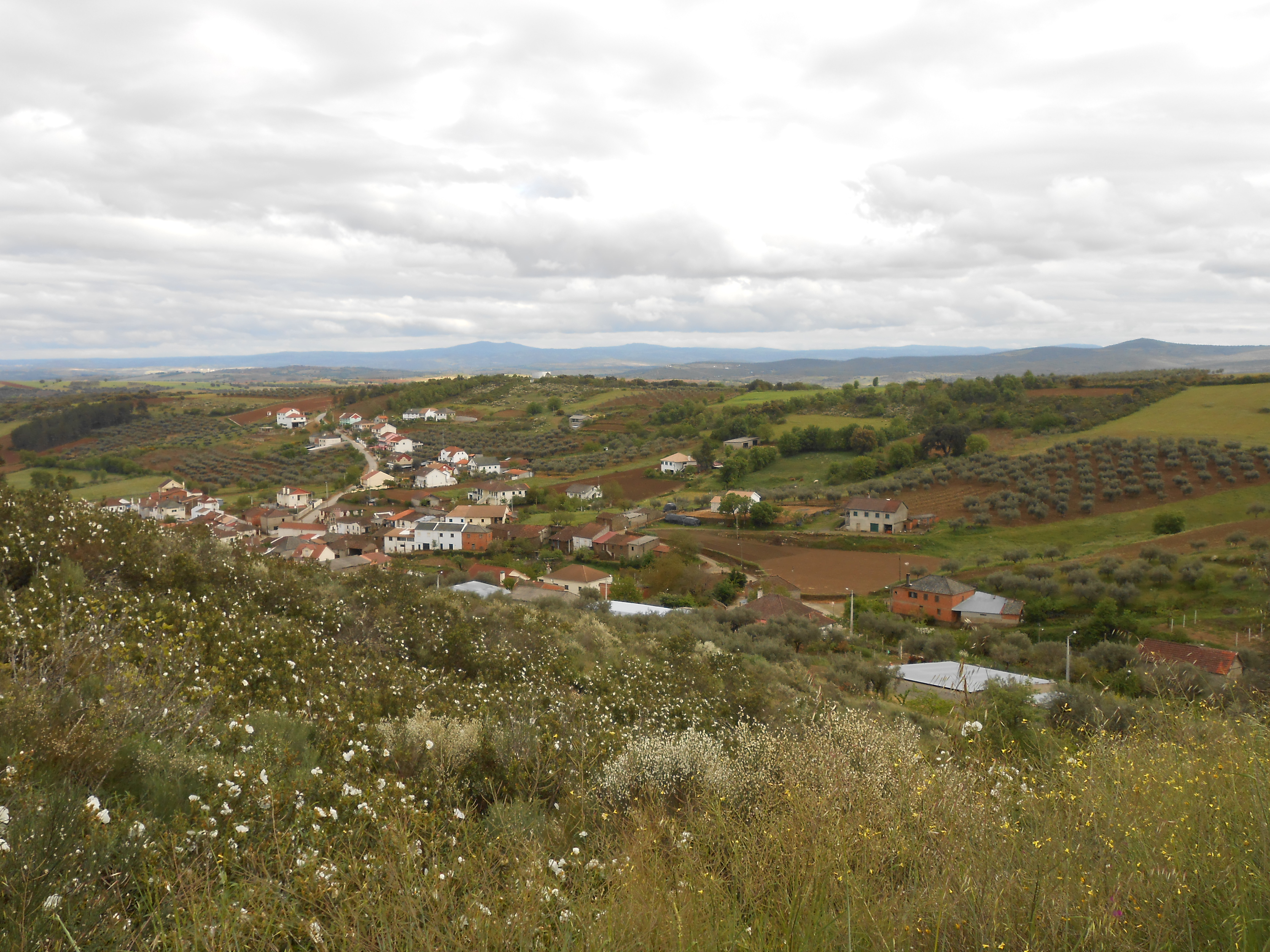

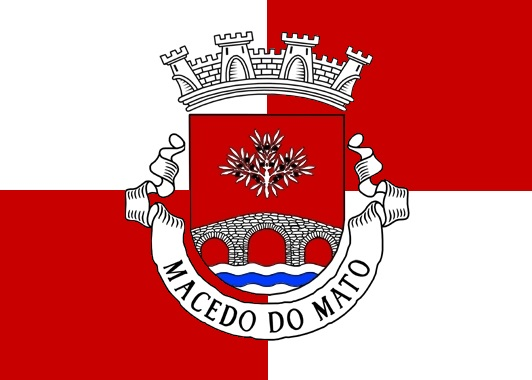
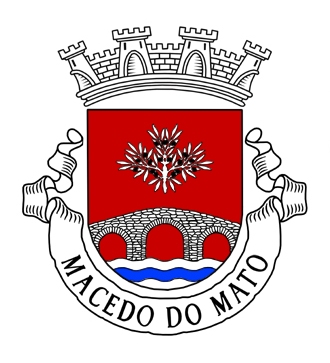
- Flag Coat of arms

- Location in Portugal
- Coordinates: 41.576°N 6.781°W
- Country: Portugal
- Region: Norte
- Intermunic. comm.: Terras de Trás-os-Montes
- District: Bragança
- Municipality: Bragança

Area
  - Total: 15.54 km^{2} (6.00 sq mi)

Population (2011)
  - Total: 208
  - Density: 13.4/km^{2} (34.7/sq mi)
- Time zone: UTC+00:00 (WET)
  - Summer (DST): UTC+01:00 (WEST)

Macedo do Mato is a civil parish in the municipality (concelho) of Bragança, in northern Portugal. The population in 2011 was 208, in an area of 15.54 km^{2} (6.00 sq mi).

== History ==
There are abundant archaeological vestiges in the parish. The oldest and populous fortification of the region, Cabeço da Terronha, dates from the Iron Age. Its settlement was assisted by the good natural conditions for defense and controlled a geo-strategic position in the region. Artifacts collected from the surface of the site included ceramic fragments.

A Roman funerary complex was located in Sanceriz, with the inscription: DOCIO SANIGII ANNO / RVM LX.

Arising between the Roman and prehistoric periods is the prehistoric rock art site at Fonte dos Engaranhados, situated on the southwest flank of the mountain that is now located the sanctuary of Senhora do Aviso. Included in the sites artifacts is a small schist stone with the small carvings of angular and semi-circles.

Sanceriz received a foral (charter), that was later renewed on 30 December 1284, from King Manuel of Portugal (sometime in the first quarter of the 15th century).

In the first half of the 19th century, during the Liberal Wars battles occurred between the Liberal and Absolutist. Miguelist forces were pursued until Coitada where, between Macedinho and Bagueixe, they were completely annihilated.

The municipality of Sanceriz was extinguished in 1836. From this point it was integrated into the municipality of Izeda, until 1855, where it was definitively annexed into the municipality of Bragança. Until this period Frieira was the town and seat of the municipal government.

== Geography ==
The parish of Macedo do Mato is found in the extreme south of the municipality of Bragança. About 30 kilometres (19 mi) from the parish seat, along the limit with the municipality of Macedo de Cavaleiros, is the left margin of the Ribeiro de Vale de Moinhos. Macedo includes several settlements, including Macedo, Frieira and Sanceriz.

== Architecture ==
- Medieval Bridge of Freira (Ponte Medieval da Frieira), built of schist, the bridge crossed the Ribeira de Vilalva, in the center of the village of Frieira, and includes five arches with the central arch larger than the others.
- Pillory of Frieira (Pelourinho de Frieira), constructed during the 13th or 14th century, the typical Brangança pillory, is survived by its base, which was classified as a Property of Public Interest;
- Pillory of Sanceriz (Pelourinho de Sanceriz), also classified as a Property of Public Interest, the base is pyramidal and oblong, with rossetas on each corner. Constru
