= Rebordainhos e Pombares =

- Civil parish
- Location in Portugal
- Coordinates: 41.66°N 6.87°W
- Country: Portugal
- Region: Norte
- Intermunic. comm.: Terras de Trás-os-Montes
- District: Bragança
- Municipality: Bragança

Area
  - Total: 24.07 km^{2} (9.29 sq mi)

Population (2011)
  - Total: 187
  - Density: 7.8/km^{2} (20/sq mi)
- Time zone: UTC+00:00 (WET)
  - Summer (DST): UTC+01:00 (WEST)

Rebordainhos e Pombares is a civil parish in the municipality of Bragança, Portugal. It was formed in 2013 by the merger of the former parishes Rebordainhos and Pombares. The population in 2011 was 187, in an area of 24.07 km^{2}.
