= Arrabal =

An Arrabal is a Spanish and Portuguese word for an area on the periphery of a city or large town, a suburb. It may also refer to:

- Bruno Arrabal (born 1992), Brazilian footballer
- Fernando Arrabal (born 1932), Spanish author and filmmaker
- Progreso Alfarache Arrabal (1888–1964), Andalusian anarcho-syndicalist
- Arrabal (Zaragoza), a district in Zaragoza, Spain
- Arrabal (Leiria), a parish (freguesia) in Leiria, Portugal

== See also ==
- Rabal (disambiguation)
- El Raval, a neighbourhood in the Ciutat Vella district of Barcelona, Catalonia, Spain
