= Mós =

Mós may refer to the following places in Portugal:

- Mós (Bragança), a civil parish in the municipality of Bragança
- Mós (Torre de Moncorvo), a civil parish in the municipality of Torre de Moncorvo
- Mós (Vila Nova de Foz Côa), a civil parish in the municipality of Vila Nova de Foz Côa
- Mós (Vila Verde), a civil parish in the municipality of Vila Verde
