= Parâmio =

- Civil parish
- Location in Portugal
- Coordinates: 41.897°N 6.866°W
- Country: Portugal
- Region: Norte
- Intermunic. comm.: Terras de Trás-os-Montes
- District: Bragança
- Municipality: Bragança

Area
  - Total: 22.57 km^{2} (8.71 sq mi)

Population (2011)
  - Total: 214
  - Density: 9.5/km^{2} (25/sq mi)
- Time zone: UTC+00:00 (WET)
  - Summer (DST): UTC+01:00 (WEST)

Parâmio is a civil parish in the municipality of Bragança, Portugal. The population in 2011 was 214, in an area of 22.57 km^{2}.
