= Sortes =

- Civil parish
- Location in Portugal
- Coordinates: 41.706°N 6.829°W
- Country: Portugal
- Region: Norte
- Intermunic. comm.: Terras de Trás-os-Montes
- District: Bragança
- Municipality: Bragança

Area
  - Total: 21.30 km^{2} (8.22 sq mi)

Population (2011)
  - Total: 296
  - Density: 13.9/km^{2} (36.0/sq mi)
- Time zone: UTC+00:00 (WET)
  - Summer (DST): UTC+01:00 (WEST)

Sortes is a civil parish in the municipality of Bragança, Portugal. The population in 2011 was 296, in an area of 21.30 km^{2} (8.22 sq mi).
