= Samil =

Samil may also refer to:

- Samil, an alternative name for the archangel Samael
- Samil, Portugal, a parish in the municipality of Bragança
- Sam-il Movement, a Korean independence movement during the Japanese occupation
  - Samiljeol, a public holiday in South Korea on 1 March which commemorates the Samil Movement
- SAMIL Trucks, South African military logistical transport vehicles

== See also ==
- Yahya Samil Al Suwaymil Al Sulami, a Saudi Arabian national, held in extrajudicial detention in Guantanamo Bay Naval Base
