= Grijó =

Grijó may refer to the following places in Portugal:

- Grijó (Macedo de Cavaleiros), a parish in Macedo de Cavaleiros
- Grijó (Vila Nova de Gaia), a parish in Vila Nova de Gaia
- Grijó de Parada, a parish in Bragança
