= Salsas =

- Civil parish
- Location in Portugal
- Coordinates: 41.638°N 6.815°W
- Country: Portugal
- Region: Norte
- Intermunic. comm.: Terras de Trás-os-Montes
- District: Bragança
- Municipality: Bragança

Area
  - Total: 26.12 km^{2} (10.08 sq mi)

Population (2011)
  - Total: 389
  - Density: 14.9/km^{2} (38.6/sq mi)
- Time zone: UTC+00:00 (WET)
  - Summer (DST): UTC+01:00 (WEST)

Salsas is a civil parish in the municipality of Bragança, Portugal. The population in 2011 was 389, in an area of 26.12 km^{2} (10.08 sq mi).
