= Nogueira (Bragança) =

- Civil parish
- Location in Portugal
- Coordinates: 41.772°N 6.818°W
- Country: Portugal
- Region: Norte
- Intermunic. comm.: Terras de Trás-os-Montes
- District: Bragança
- Municipality: Bragança

Area
  - Total: 12.07 km^{2} (4.66 sq mi)

Population (2011)
  - Total: 495
  - Density: 41.0/km^{2} (106/sq mi)
- Time zone: UTC+00:00 (WET)
  - Summer (DST): UTC+01:00 (WEST)

Nogueira is a civil parish in the municipality of Bragança, Portugal. The population in 2011 was 495, in an area of 12.07 km^{2} (4.66 sq mi).
