= Zoio =

- Civil parish
- Location in Portugal
- Coordinates: 41.749°N 6.921°W
- Country: Portugal
- Region: Norte
- Intermunic. comm.: Terras de Trás-os-Montes
- District: Bragança
- Municipality: Bragança

Area
  - Total: 24.39 km^{2} (9.42 sq mi)

Population (2011)
  - Total: 189
  - Density: 7.7/km^{2} (20/sq mi)
- Time zone: UTC+00:00 (WET)
  - Summer (DST): UTC+01:00 (WEST)

Zoio is a civil parish in the municipality of Bragança, Portugal. The population in 2011 was 189, in an area of 24.39 km².
