= Carragosa =

- Civil parish
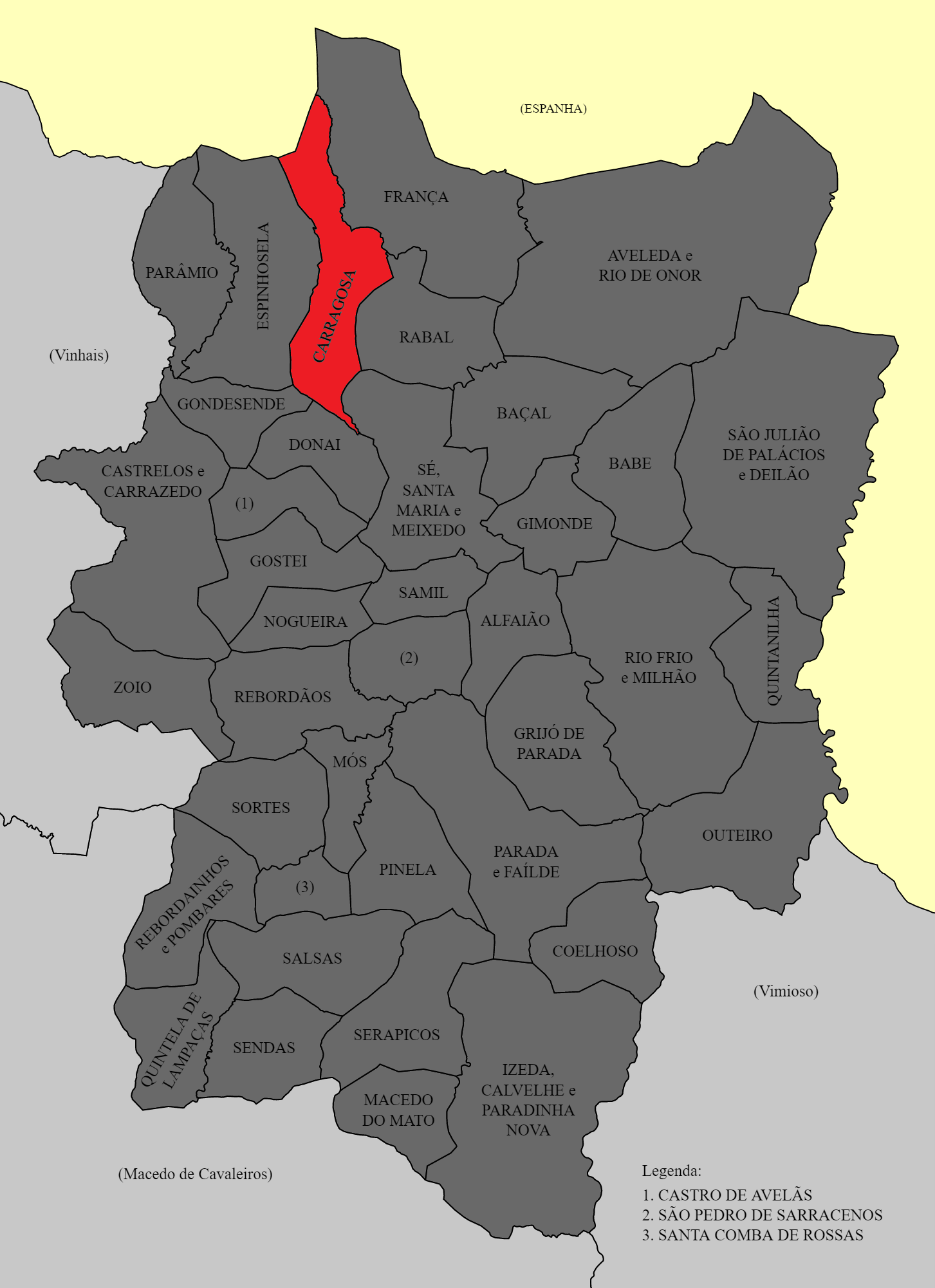
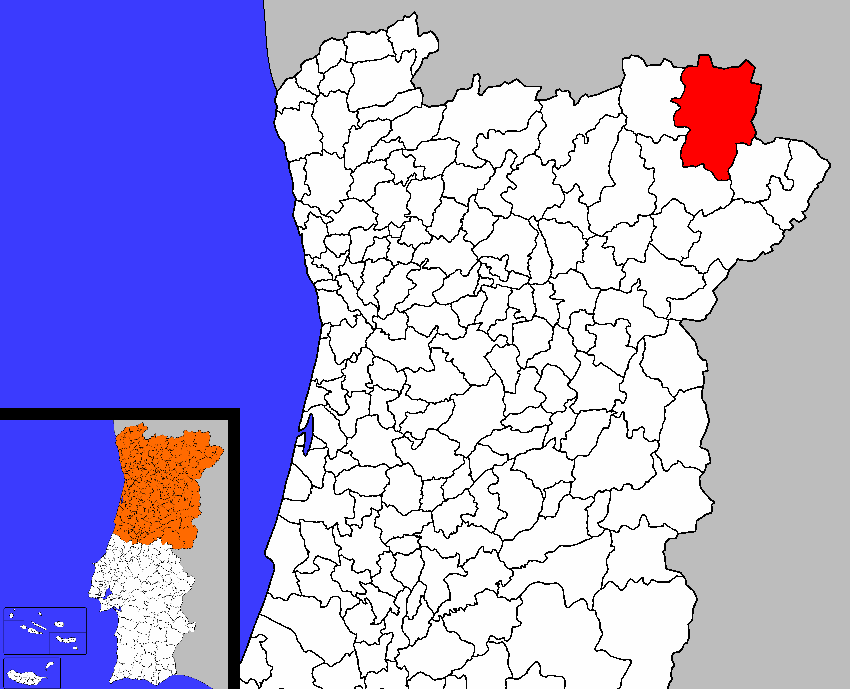
- Coordinates: 41.867°N 6.800°W
- Country: Portugal
- Region: Norte
- Intermunic. comm.: Terras de Trás-os-Montes
- District: Bragança
- Municipality: Bragança

Area
  - Total: 27.77 km^{2} (10.72 sq mi)

Population (2011)
  - Total: 190
  - Density: 6.8/km^{2} (18/sq mi)
- Time zone: UTC+00:00 (WET)
  - Summer (DST): UTC+01:00 (WEST)

Carragosa is a civil parish in the municipality of Bragança, Portugal. The population in 2011 was 190, in an area of 27.77 km^{2}.

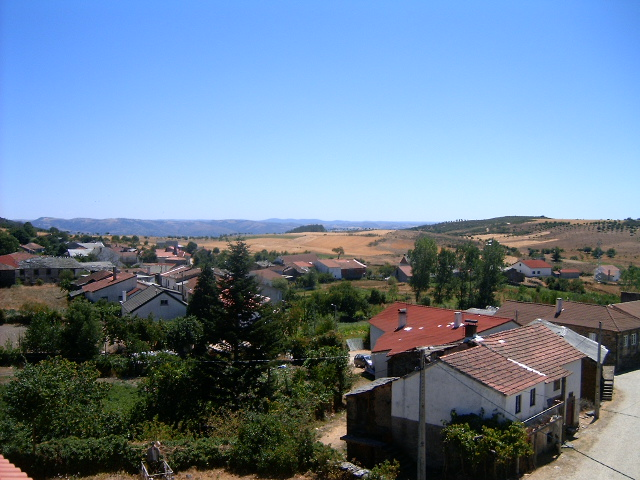
Carragosa village
