= Rebordainhos =

- Village
- Interactive map of Rebordainhos

Rebordainhos is a village and head of civil parish Rebordainhos e Pombares in the municipality of Bragança, Portugal.

== History ==
The village of Rebordainhos was, until the 19th century, head of a municipality (concelho) with the same name, constituted only by Rebordainhos and another small village called Vilar D’ouro.

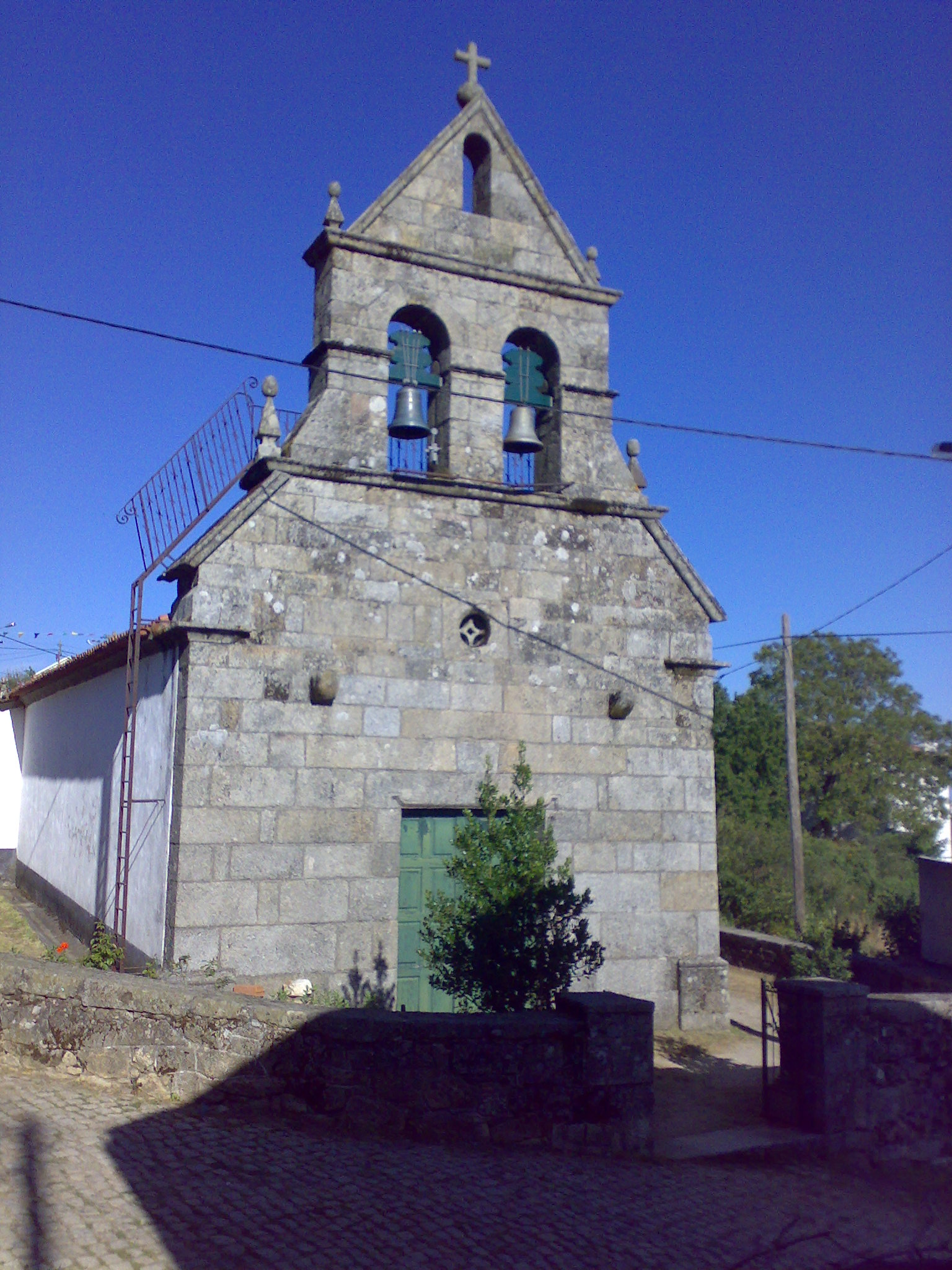
Church of Rebordainhos

Population of Rebordainhos (1864 - 2011)
Year	Pop.	±%
1864	360	—
1878	399	+10.8%
1890	445	+11.5%
1911	460	+3.4%
1930	391	−15.0%
1960	544	+39.1%
1970	363	−33.3%
1991	254	−30.0%
2001	188	−26.0%
2011	146	−22.3%
