= Mendo Alão =

Mendo Alao de Bragança
- senhor da Vila de Bragança
- Born: c.1000 Brittany
- Died: c.1050 Bragança, Portugal
- Spouse: Ardzruni da Armênia

Mendo Alão, Lord of Vila de Bragança, was a medieval knight of the 11th century. He served as a monk in the Monastery of São Salvador de Castro de Avelãs, Portugal.

== Biography ==
According to ancient genealogists, he was a grandson of Alan II, Duke of Brittany. Those same sources indicate that he was born around the year 1000 in Brittany, son of the Count Alain of Nantes, a rich nobleman, and an Armenian princess, belonging to the Kingdom of Vaspurakan.

Mendo Alão de Bragança was married with an Armenian princess, who was possibly the daughter of Senekerim-Hovhannes Artsruni. In addition to having been lord of the lands of Bragança, he extended its dominions to Castile and León. He and his wife had two children: Fernão Mendes de Bragança and Ouroana Mendes.
