= Gostei =

- Civil parish
- Location in Portugal
- Coordinates: 41.791°N 6.821°W
- Country: Portugal
- Region: Norte
- Intermunic. comm.: Terras de Trás-os-Montes
- District: Bragança
- Municipality: Bragança

Area
  - Total: 19.49 km^{2} (7.53 sq mi)

Population (2011)
  - Total: 425
  - Density: 21.8/km^{2} (56.5/sq mi)
- Time zone: UTC+00:00 (WET)
  - Summer (DST): UTC+01:00 (WEST)

Gostei is a civil parish in the municipality of Bragança, Portugal. The population in 2011 was 425, in an area of 19.49 km^{2} (7.53 sq mi).
