= Serapicos =

Serapicos may refer to the following places in Portugal:

- Serapicos (Bragança), a parish in the municipality of Bragança
- Serapicos (Valpaços), a parish in the municipality of Valpaços
