= Donai =

- Civil parish
- Location in Portugal
- Coordinates: 41.833°N 6.806°W
- Country: Portugal
- Region: Norte
- Intermunic. comm.: Terras de Trás-os-Montes
- District: Bragança
- Municipality: Bragança

Area
  - Total: 15.07 km^{2} (5.82 sq mi)

Population (2011)
  - Total: 446
  - Density: 29.6/km^{2} (76.7/sq mi)
- Time zone: UTC+00:00 (WET)
  - Summer (DST): UTC+01:00 (WEST)

Donai is a civil parish in the municipality of Bragança, Portugal. The population in 2011 was 446, in an area of 15.07 km^{2} (5.82 sq mi).
