= Serapicos (Bragança) =

- Civil parish
- Location in Portugal
- Coordinates: 41.618°N 6.762°W
- Country: Portugal
- Region: Norte
- Intermunic. comm.: Terras de Trás-os-Montes
- District: Bragança
- Municipality: Bragança

Area
  - Total: 28.25 km^{2} (10.91 sq mi)

Population (2011)
  - Total: 208
  - Density: 7.36/km^{2} (19.1/sq mi)
- Time zone: UTC+00:00 (WET)
  - Summer (DST): UTC+01:00 (WEST)

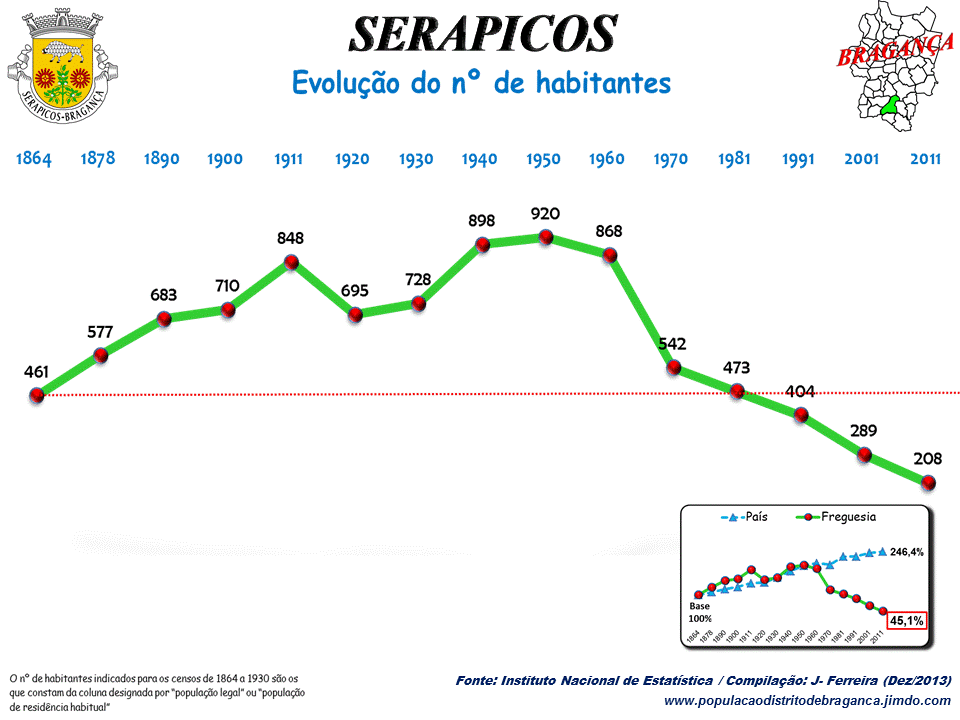

Serapicos is a civil parish in the municipality of Bragança, Portugal. The population in 2011 was 208, in an area of 28.25 km^{2} (10.91 sq mi).
