= São Pedro de Sarracenos =

- Civil parish
- Location in Portugal
- Coordinates: 41.765°N 6.755°W
- Country: Portugal
- Region: Norte
- Intermunic. comm.: Terras de Trás-os-Montes
- District: Bragança
- Municipality: Bragança

Area
  - Total: 15.91 km^{2} (6.14 sq mi)

Population (2011)
  - Total: 366
  - Density: 23/km^{2} (60/sq mi)
- Time zone: UTC+00:00 (WET)
  - Summer (DST): UTC+01:00 (WEST)

São Pedro de Sarracenos is a civil parish in the municipality of Bragança, Portugal. The population in 2011 was 366, in an area of 15.91 km^{2}.
