= Rabal =

Rabal may refer to:

- Rabal (Portugal), a Portuguese parish in the district of Bragança
- Dr. Rabal, a fictitious character in the Star Trek series The Next Generation
