= Rabal (Portugal) =

- Civil parish
- Location in Portugal
- Coordinates: 41.869°N 6.752°W
- Country: Portugal
- Region: Norte
- Intermunic. comm.: Terras de Trás-os-Montes
- District: Bragança
- Municipality: Bragança

Area
  - Total: 23.37 km^{2} (9.02 sq mi)

Population (2011)
  - Total: 171
  - Density: 7.32/km^{2} (19.0/sq mi)
- Time zone: UTC+00:00 (WET)
  - Summer (DST): UTC+01:00 (WEST)

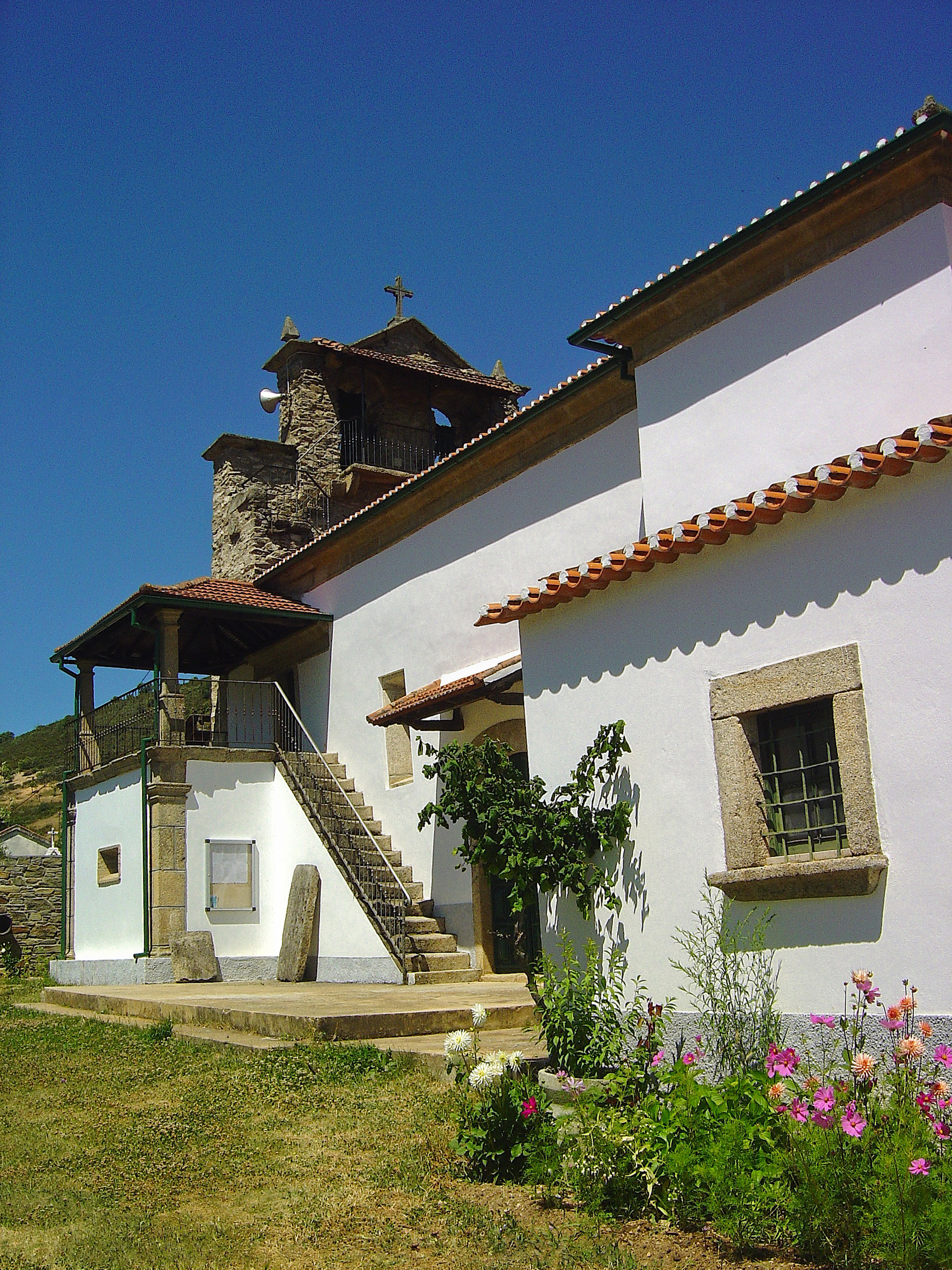
Matriz de Rabal Church - Portugal

Rabal is a civil parish in the municipality of Bragança, Portugal. The population in 2011 was 170, in an area of 23.37 km^{2} (9.02 sq mi).
