= Samil, Portugal =

Samil
- Civil parish
- Location in Portugal
- Coordinates: 41.776°N 6.759°W
- Country: Portugal
- Region: Norte
- Intermunic. comm.: Terras de Trás-os-Montes
- District: Bragança
- Municipality: Bragança

Area
  - Total: 10.25 km^{2} (3.96 sq mi)

Population (2011)
  - Total: 1,246
  - Density: 120/km^{2} (310/sq mi)
- Time zone: UTC+00:00 (WET)
  - Summer (DST): UTC+01:00 (WEST)

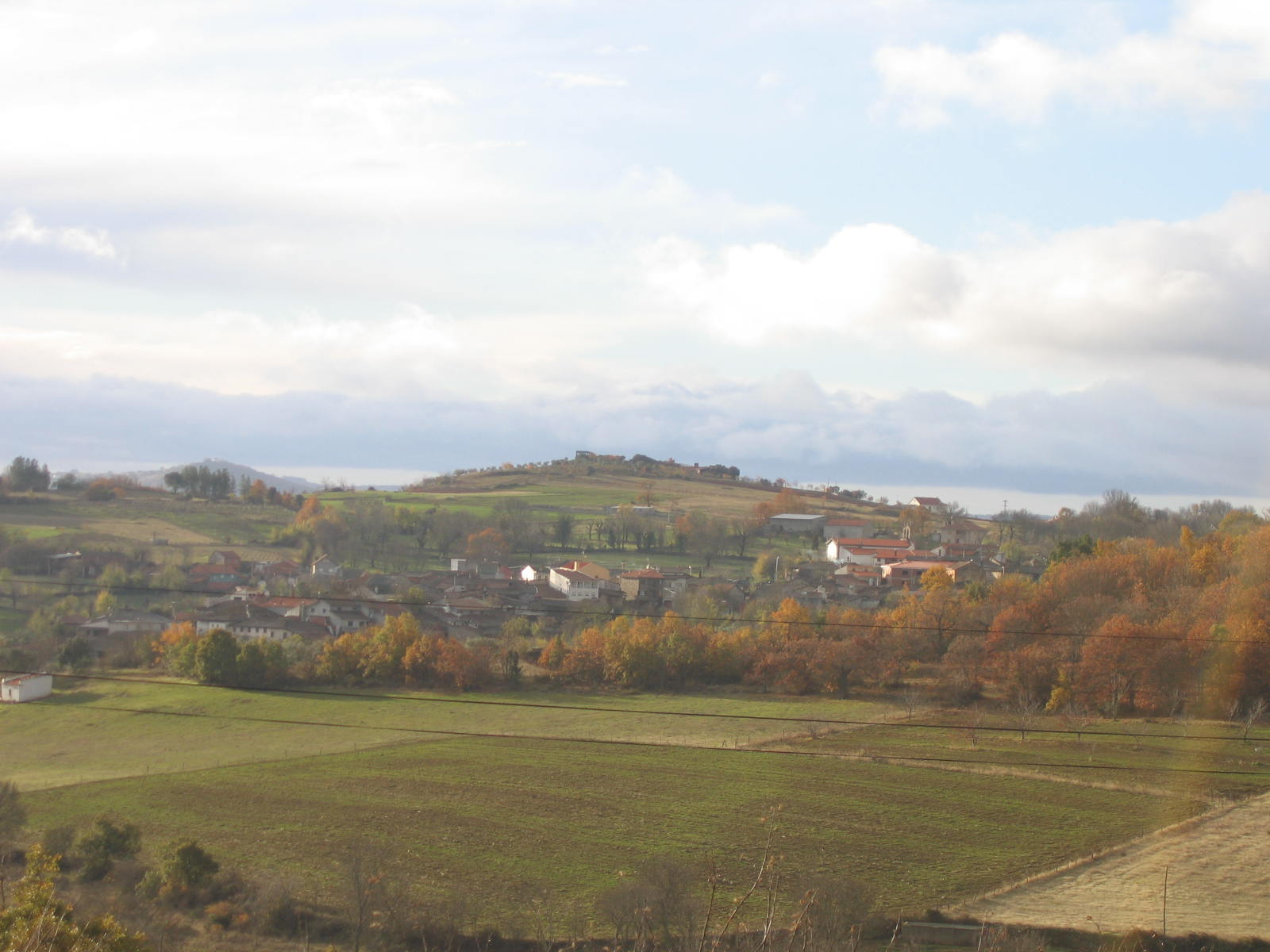
Samil

Samil is a civil parish in the municipality of Bragança, Portugal. The population in 2011 was 1,246, in an area of 10.25 km^{2}.
