= Old Cathedral of the Holy Name of Jesus, Bragança =

Coordinates: 41.8057°N 6.7625°W

Old Cathedral of the Holy Name of Jesus
- Antiga Catedral do Santo Nome de Jesus
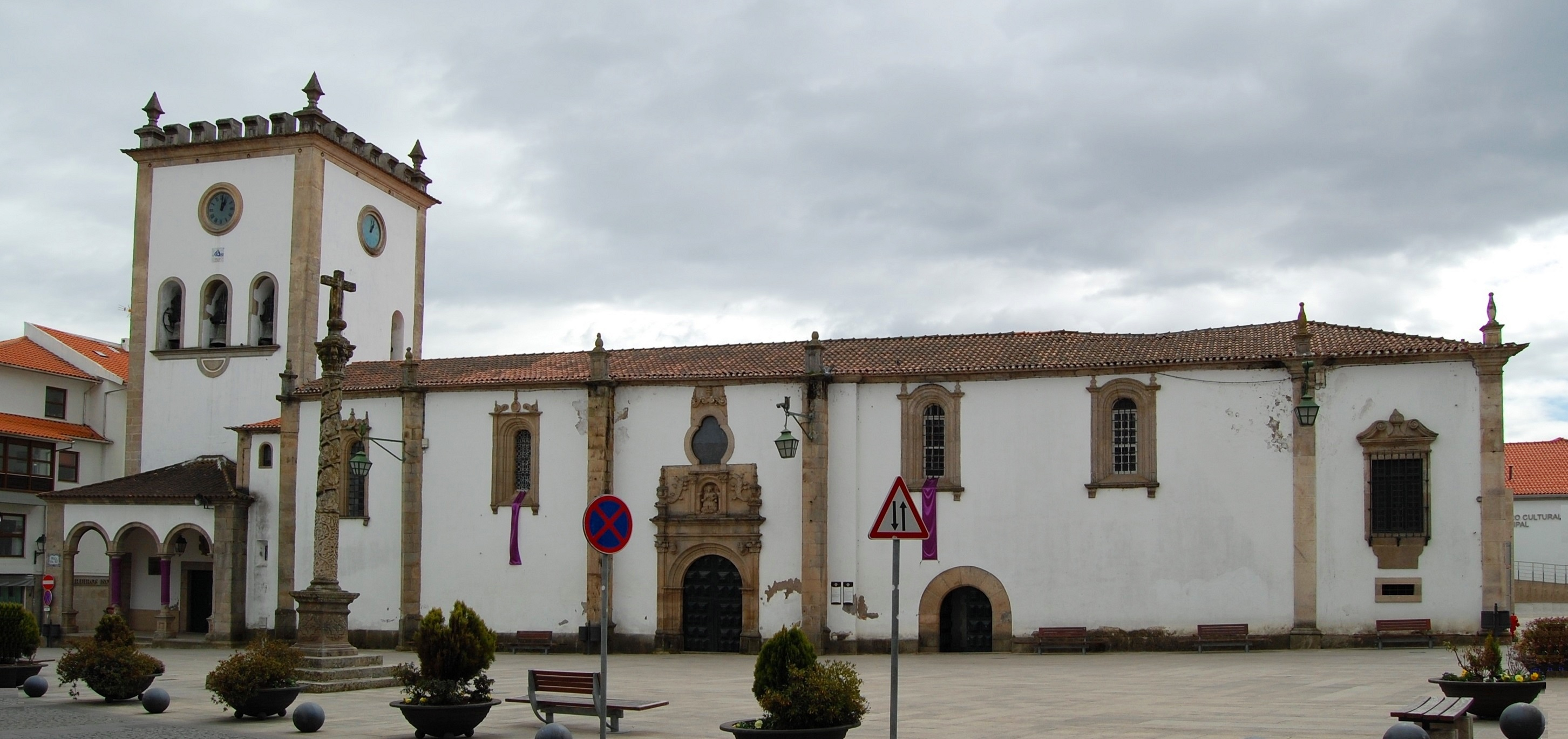
- Old Cathedral of the Holy Name of Jesus
- Location: Bragança
- Country: Portugal
- Denomination: Roman Catholic Church

The Old Cathedral of the Holy Name of Jesus (Portuguese: Antiga Catedral do Santo Nome de Jesus) also called Holy Name of Jesus Cathedral is the former headquarters of the diocese of Bragança-Miranda in northeastern Portugal. The temple was built in the sixteenth century to have the functions of a convent. In 1764, with the transfer of the seat of the diocese of Braganza Miranda do Douro, the building became the diocesan cathedral. With the opening of the new cathedral in 2001, the church became a parish church.

The temple is dedicated to the Holy Name of Jesus and John the Baptist. The building is classified as a "monument of public interest" by the Directorate General of Cultural Heritage of Portugal.

== See also ==
- Roman Catholicism in Portugal
- Holy Name of Jesus Cathedral, Fianarantsoa
- List of Jesuit sites
