= Ponte de Frieira =

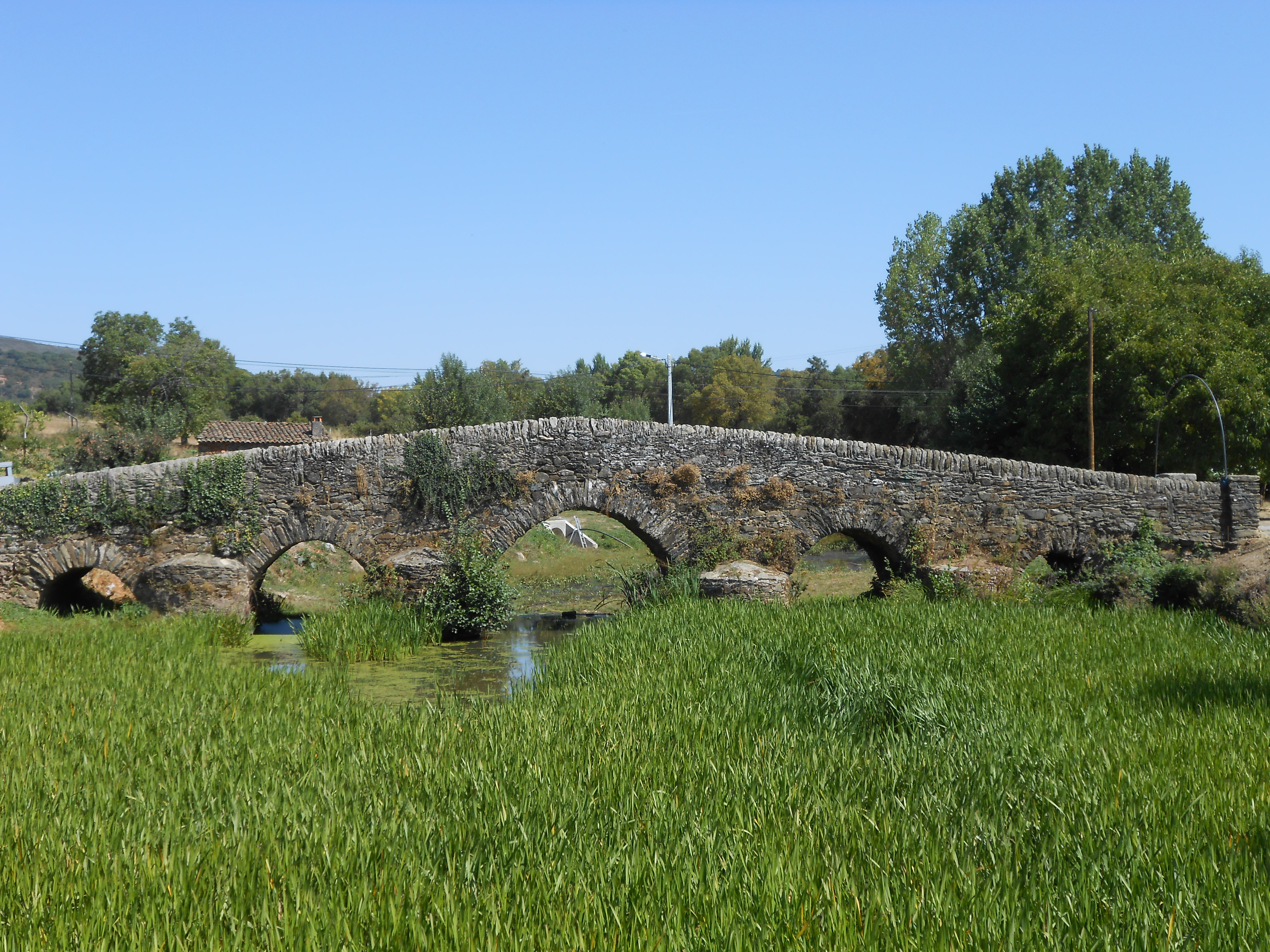
- Coordinates: 41°34′28″N 6°45′31″W
- Locale: Macedo do Mato, Bragança District, Portugal

Location
- Interactive map of Ponte de Frieira

Ponte de Frieira is a bridge in Portugal. It is located in Bragança District.

== See also ==
- List of bridges in Portugal
