= Mós (Bragança) =

- Civil parish
- Location in Portugal
- Coordinates: 41.714°N 6.794°W
- Country: Portugal
- Region: Norte
- Intermunic. comm.: Terras de Trás-os-Montes
- District: Bragança
- Municipality: Bragança

Area
  - Total: 11.62 km^{2} (4.49 sq mi)

Population (2011)
  - Total: 178
  - Density: 15/km^{2} (40/sq mi)
- Time zone: UTC+00:00 (WET)
  - Summer (DST): UTC+01:00 (WEST)

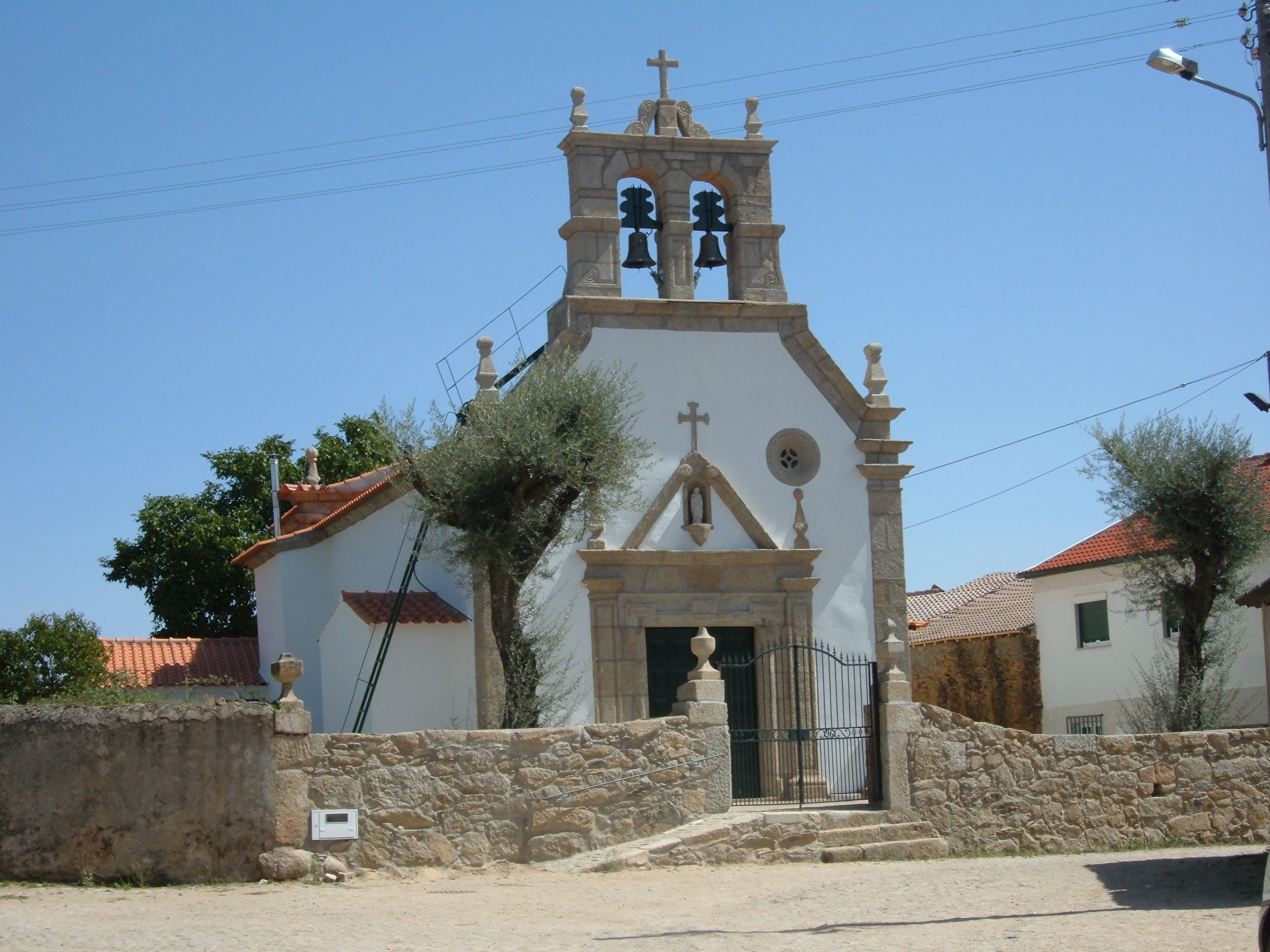
Saint Peter's Church in Mós

Mós is a civil parish in the municipality of Bragança, Portugal. The population in 2011 was 178, in an area of 11.62 km^{2}.
