= Bragança, Portugal =

City in Trás-os-Montes, northern Portugal

Bragança Bergáncia (Mirandese) Braganza
- City, municipality, and district capital
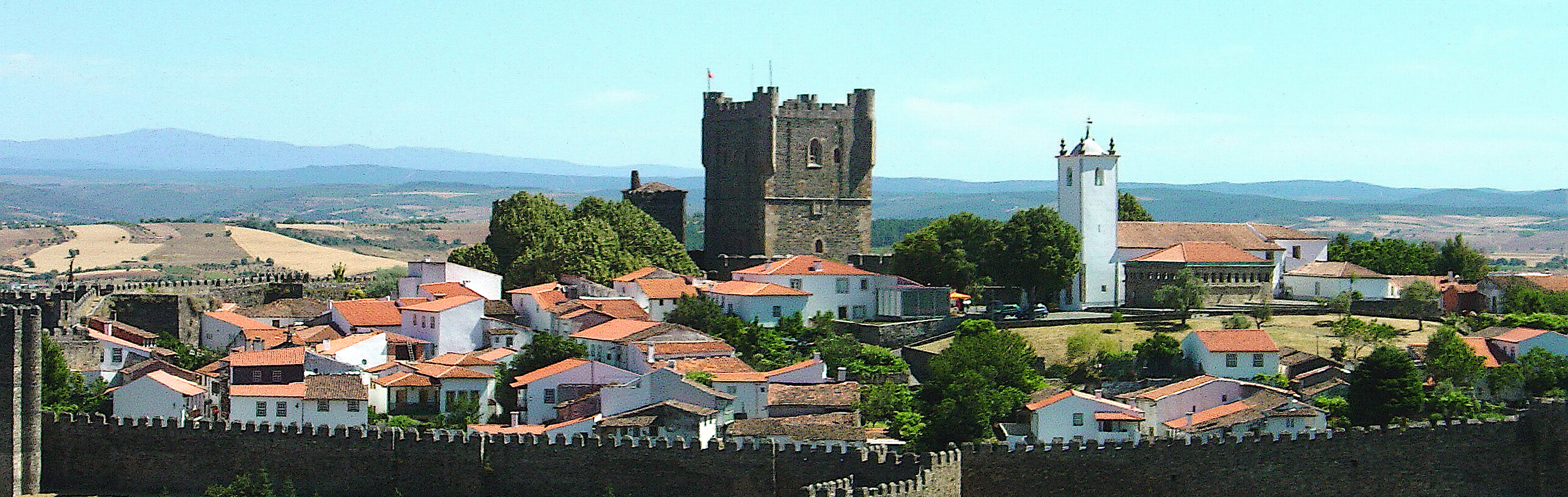
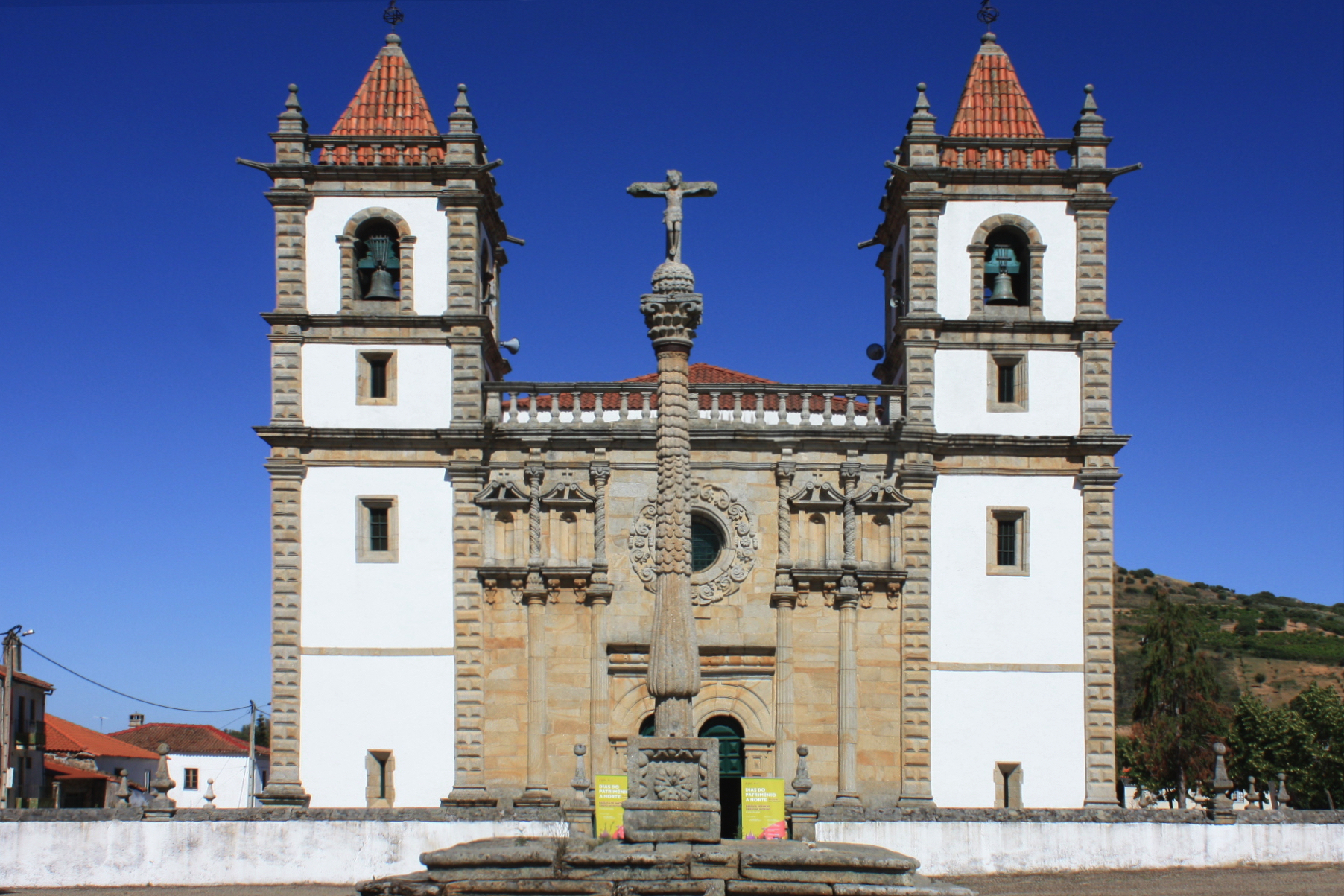
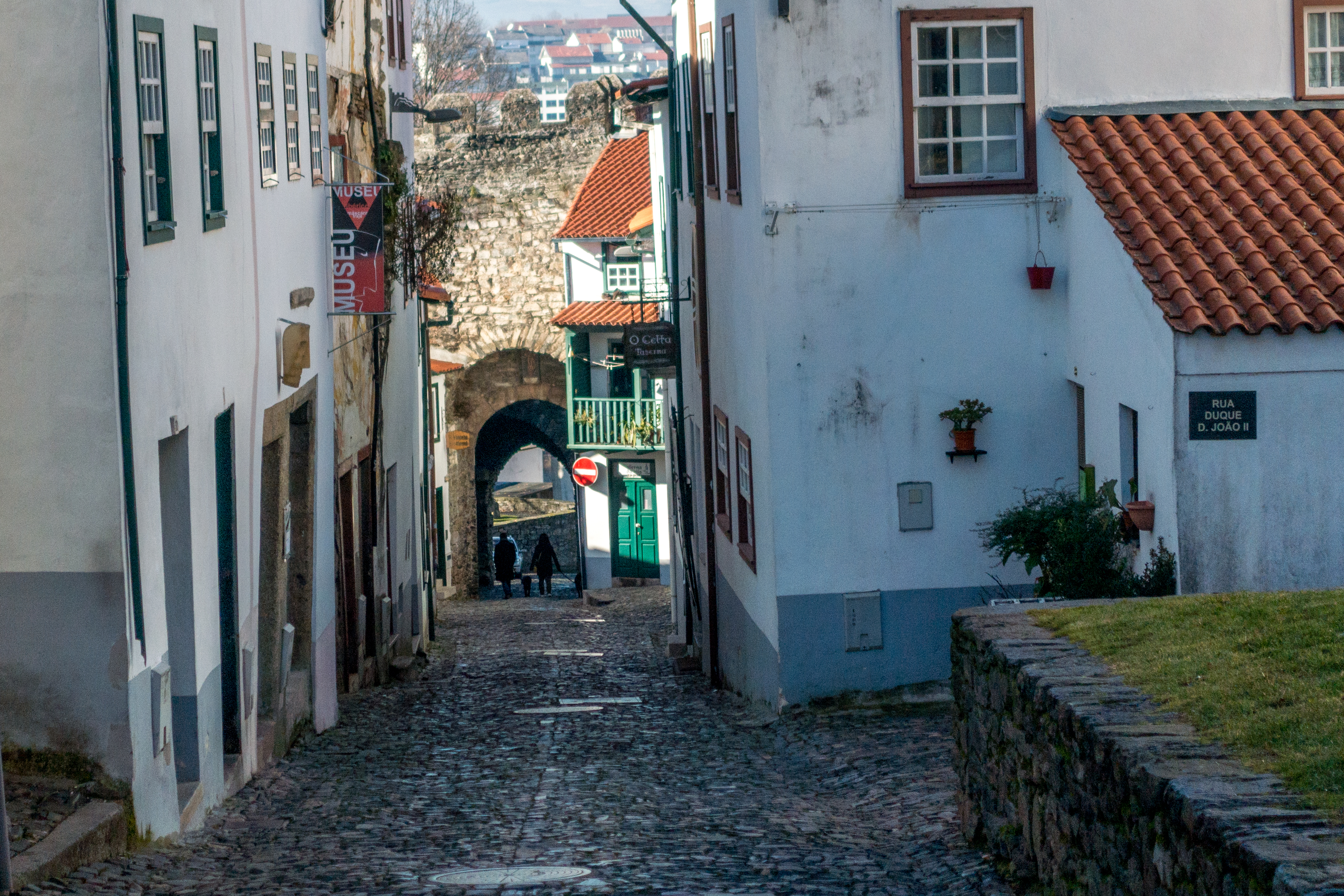
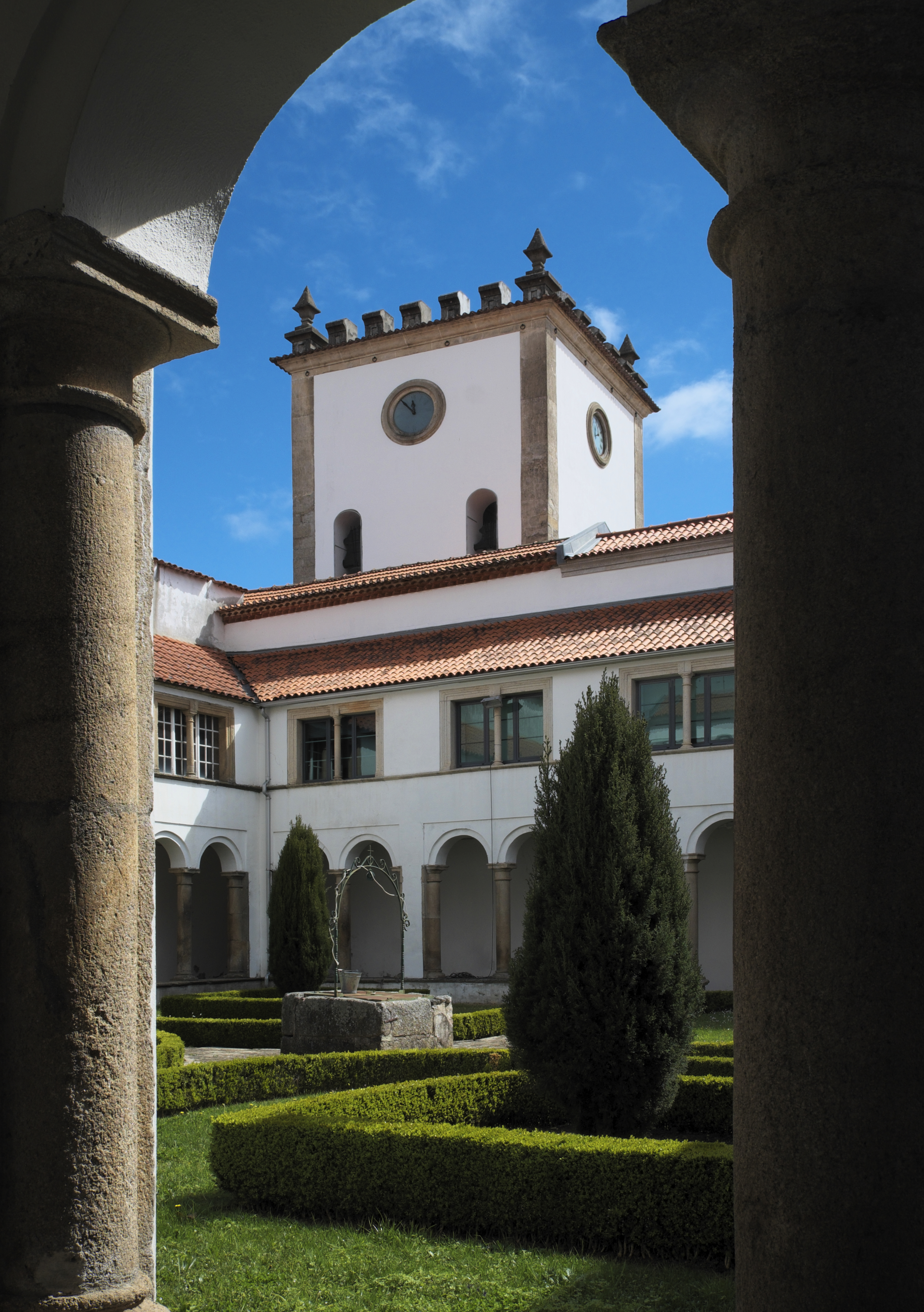
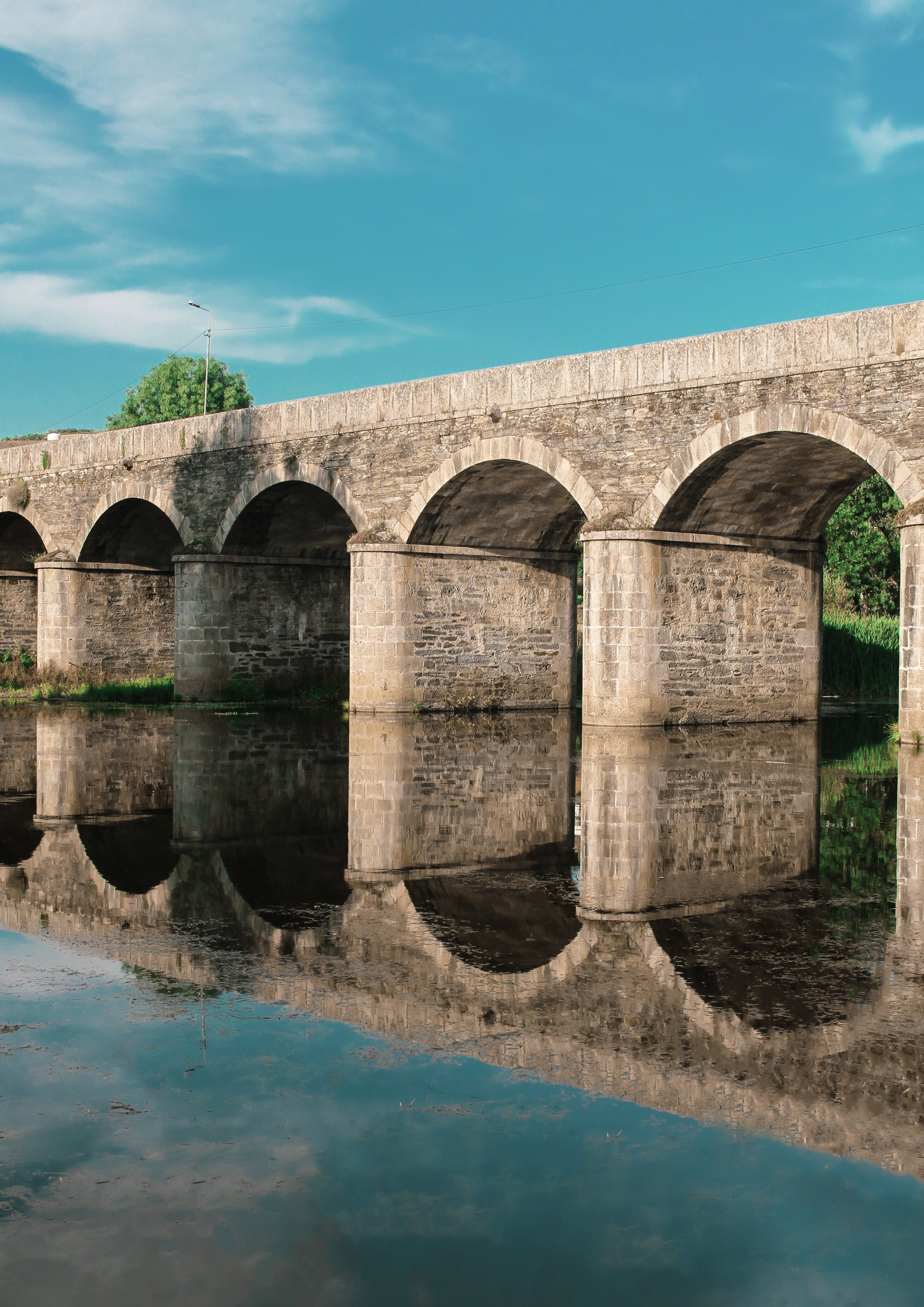
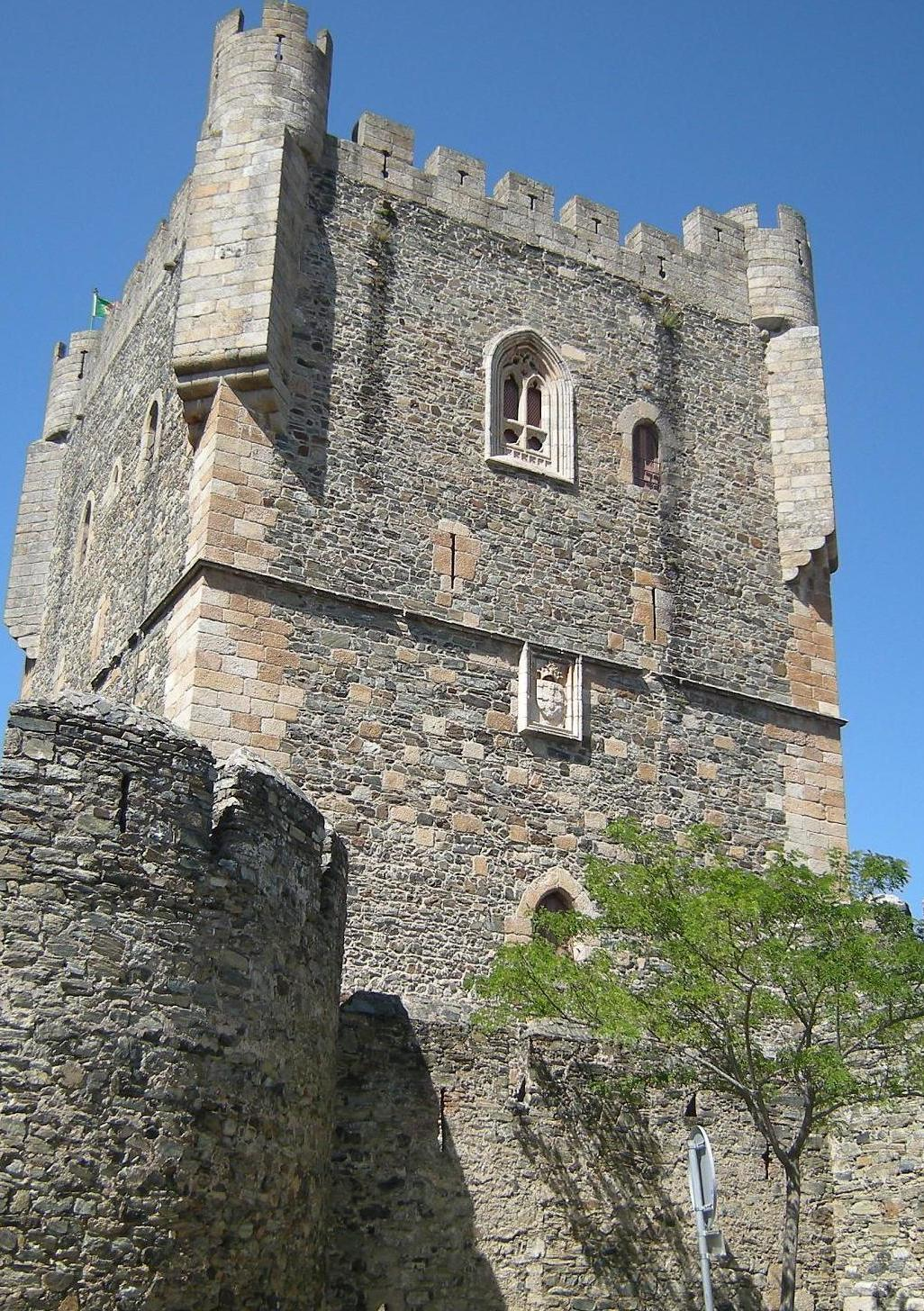
- From top, left to right: Panoramic view, Basilica of Santo Cristo de Outeiro, Rua D.João II in the historic centre, Bragança Cathedral (old See), Old Bridge of Gimonde, Braganza Castle

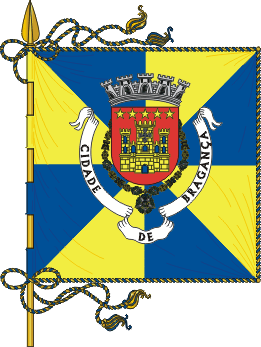
- Flag Coat of arms
- Interactive map of Bragança
- Location within Portugal
- Coordinates: 41°48′24″N 6°45′32″W
- Country: Portugal
- Region: Northern Portugal
- Intermunicipal community: Terras de Trás-os-Montes
- District: Bragança
- Historical province: Trás-os-Montes e Alto Douro (1936 map)/ Trás-os-Montes (pre-1832)
- Charter: 1187
- City status: 1464
- Civil parishes: 39

Government
  - Type: Municipality (LAU)
  - Body: Câmara Municipal (executive); Municipal Assembly (deliberative)
  - Mayor (2025-2029): Isabel Ferreira (PS)
  - President of the Assembly: António Malhão (PSD)

Area
  - Total: 1,173.57 km^{2} (453.12 sq mi)
  - City-proper (INE): 27.68 km^{2} (10.69 sq mi)
- Elevation: 674 m (2,211 ft)

Population (2021)
  - Total: 34,582
  - Density: 29.467/km^{2} (76.320/sq mi)
  - City-proper (INE): 24,041
  - City-proper (INE) density: 868.5/km^{2} (2,249/sq mi)
- Demonym(s): brigantino, bragançano, bragantino, braganção, bragancês (rare)
- Time zone: UTC+00:00 (WET)
  - Summer (DST): UTC+01:00 (WEST)
- Postal code: 5300
- Area code: 273
- Dicofre code: 0402
- Patron saint: Our Lady of Graces
- Municipal holiday: 22 August (Patron)
- Website: www.cm-braganca.pt

Bragança (Portuguese: [bɾɐˈɣɐ̃.sɐ]; Mirandese: Bergáncia, also known in English as Braganza (/brəˈɡænzə/ brə-GAN-zə, US also /-ˈɡɑːn-/ -GAHN-), officially styled the City of Bragança (Portuguese: Cidade de Bragança), is a city and municipality in north-eastern Portugal, capital of the district of Bragança, in the Terras de Trás-os-Montes subregion (a small portion in the southeast of the municipality lies in the Tierra de Miranda). The population in 2011 was 35,341, in an area of 1173.57 km².

== History ==
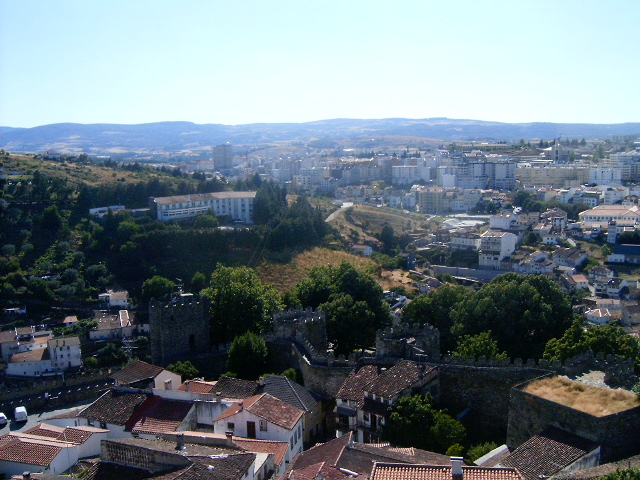
Bragança seen from the Castle of Bragança

Archeological evidence permits a determination of human settlement in this region to the Paleolithic. During the Neolithic there was a growth of productive human settlements which concentrated on planting and domestication of animals, with a nascent religion. There are many vestiges of these ancient communities, including ceramics, agricultural implements, weights, arrowheads and modest jewelry found in funerary mounds, such as the tumulus of Donai (mostly destroyed). There are many signs of megalithic constructions dotted throughout the region. It is believed that the larger prehistoric communities developed in Terra Fria, probably in the final part of the Bronze Age (1000-700 BC). During this period, the Celtic or Castro culture of fortified urban structures resulted in walled settlements, situated in elevated areas, with a panoramic view for defense. These communities essentially survived on subsistence agriculture.

Roman colonization, which occurred late in the Roman era, resulted in the establishment of private property and movement away from the forests, in addition to organizational changes resulting administrative, material and cultural evolution. Remnants of the Gallaico-Roman castro societies are evident in Castro of Sacóias and the Castro of Avelãs. In these excavations, modern archaeologists have discovered funerary remains, coins and implements. The Castro of Avelãs (about three kilometres from Bragança) was an important centre on the military road to Astorga, although there are many examples (in Alfaião, Aveleda, Carrazedo, Castro de Avelãs, Donai, França, Gostei, Meixedo, Pinela, Quintela Lampaças, etc.) of the Roman presence.

The area was dominated by two ethnic communities: the Zoelae, with their seat in Castro de Avelãs, and a Lusitanian civitas under the stewardship of the Baniense in the southern part of the district. A Latin map, Atlas de Gotha by Justus Perthes, mentioned three settlements within this region: Aquae Flaviae (Chaves), Veniatia (Vinhais) and Zoelae (its seat in Zoelas, today Castro de Avelãs) without mentioning any reference to a name similar to Bragança. During Roman colonization, it was part of Gallaecia and dependent administratively on Astorga, on the Atlantic axis of a Roman highway from Meseta, that controlled the gold, iron and silver trade. The references to a settlement with the name similar to Bragança occurred in the acts of Council Lugo (569 AD) regarding the Vergancia. A similar reference by Wamba (666 AD) referred to Bregancia, and where, supposedly two Christian martyrs (John and Paul) were born.

Records of the proto-Germanic Suebic and Visigothic kingdoms are few, probably an indication of advancement in rural agrarian and pastoral communities during their occupation and settlement. Toponymic references such as Gimonde, Guadramil and Samil are some of the remains from this period.

=== Medieval period ===
Although some placenames remained (such as Alfaião, Babe, Baçal, Bagueixe, Mogadouro), the influence of the Islamic civilization to the northern regions and Douro (as well as mountainous areas) was very small. There is but one passing reference to a Pelagius Count of Bragança during the Council of Oviedo (in 970). Owing to the Reconquista, this region was quickly integrated into the Kingdom of Asturias (later León after the 10th century), and the economy, ecclesiastical organization, architecture, culture and language was heavily influenced by the Asturo-Leonese.

During the 11th and 12th century, in the books of genealogy, the Bragançãos family of Castro d'Avelãs (at the time the seat of the Benedictine monastery) dominated Bragança, its abbot Mendo Alãm, who later married Princess Ardzrouri of Armenia (who passed through the region on a pilgrimage to Santiago de Compostela), originated the hereditary line. Legend holds that Fernão Mendes (a Braganção) presumably kidnapped, then married, Sancha, daughter of Afonso Henriques and Teresa, obtaining with his dead the important defense of the region. Fernão Mendes and Sancha would find the ruins of the ancient village and rebuild from the ground in the Realenga das Terras da Bragança. Historically, Fernão Mendes was later referred to as the Brave for his gallantry during the Battle of Ourique. Yet, later, the region of Bragança would become a property of the Crown as no heir would develop from their union. The Bragançãos contributed to the foundation of the settlement, and its importance would remain integral to the defense of the country, owing to the geopolitical position in the northwest frontier with the Spanish Kingdoms of León and Castile. By the seventh generation, around 1258, the Bragançãos lost their hereditary title, and Afonso III transferred the title to Nuno Martins, a descendant of the line.

The origin of the city of Bragança dates from the 10th or 11th century, and likely developed from a Romanized castro, although archaeological evidence is still under-discovered. The strategic importance of Bragança, to military control of access, resulted from its localization and was reinforced by administrative institutions established by the King. Sancho signed a foral in June 1187, which was renovated by King Afonso III, in May 1253, and later by Manuel I on 11 November 1514. The foral demonstrated specifically the importance of the city, which was the first in the Trás-os-Montes to receive the title of town. In his proclamation, Afonso III specified that the municipality of Bragança pertained to the Church of Braganza, and not the crown, and that its represents should motivate the settlement of all unpopulated lands. This conflicted with the Military Orders and administration of the Monastery of Castro de Avelãs, who believed that they had the right to settle all villages and use the land as they willed. The privileges that were conceded to the nascent Portuguese population by various monarchs outlines the geographic importance of attracting settlement to the northern frontier: Afonso III created an annual fair in 1272 and Fernando establishes a free-trade fair in 1383, which was renovated or reformulated by successive monarchs (John I in 1392 and 1413, the Regent Peter in 1439 and Afonso V in 1455). This initiatives, although tempered by cyclical migration and epidemics, permitted the concentration of settlers in the northern community.

During the 14th century, wars with Castile result in the destruction of the frontier settlements and Castellian troops take the city of Bragança. In 1381, the region is once again devastated militarily, resulting in famine, epidemics, infant mortality rates, the abandonment of lands, resulting in an 83% drop in the population. In 1387, the Duke of Lancaster and Constance sign the Treaty of Babe, that recognized John I's title and rights to Portugal and the Algarve (then already acclaimed in the Portuguese Cortes and married to Philippa of Lancaster). But in 1396, John returned to Bragança to curb Castilian aggression, taking the titles from Afonso Pimental (who was an ally of Castile) and delivering into his illegitimate son's hands Afonso (donated in 1401 by Regent Peter), who he charged with reinforcing the border and elaborating the defenses of the castle. John then bound the frontier region to the Crown with a marriage of his son to Beatriz, daughter of Nuno Álvares Pereira in order to strengthen the ties of the fledgling crown to the land.

Historically, a Jewish community was present in Bragança during medieval times. When the Jews were expelled from Spain in 1492, 3000 Jewish refugees settled in Bragança. When the Jews were forced to convert to Christianity, Bragança became an important center for crypto-Judaism. There was crypto-Jewish activity in Bragança until the second half of the 20th century.

=== Monarchy ===
By the middle of the 13th century, Bragança was divided into four parishes: Santa Maria (then the main town), São Tiago, São João (outside the castle walls) and São Vicente.

In 1442, King Afonso V established the hereditary dukedom of the Duchy of Braganza, for his uncle Afonso, Count of Barcelos, becoming one of the oldest fiefdoms in Portugal. The second Duke of Braganza, Fernando, reinforced his grandfather's frontier strategy and expanded his territory by integrating the lands of his deceased brother Afonso, Marquis of Valença. Ferdinand supported King Afonso V of Portugal, and during his North African campaigns, became the Governor of Ceuta. Ferdinand was responsible for ensuring the elevation of Braganza to the status of city (on 20 February 1464), and was Regent when Afonso V returned to North Africa. But his conspiracies and court intrigues during the reign of King John II would have him condemned to death, the banning of the House of Braganza and the incorporation of their hereditary lands and titles into the Crown. The lands remained in the hands of the Crown until the reign of Ferdinand of Portugal, when they were offered as a dowry to João Afonso Pimentel on his marriage to Joana Teles de Menezes, half-sister of Queen Leonor Teles.

King Manuel I reinstated the Braganzas on 18 June 1496, but forced their heirs to expel the Jews from Bragança, resulting in the departure of hundreds of the inhabitants that had supported and promoted town. Those that did not convert to Christianity left Portugal (with their money, contacts, knowledge, merchant experience), including Orobio de Castro (who became a leader in the Amsterdam synagogue) and Jacob de Castro Sarmento who was an important figure in England and Scotland, professor at the University of Aberdeen.

In the 14th and 15th century, growth outside the city of Bragança developed, and in the proceeding centuries there were major renovations and remodelling to the churches, convents and noble estates within the municipality. Many of street names from Bragança also show a rapid industrialization and commercialization in the community, with the appearances of street names such as Rua dos Prateiros (silver-smiths), Rua dos Sineiros (bell-makers), Rua dos Oleiros (potters), Rua da Alfândega (customs house), Ponte das Tenarias (tanners), Ponte das Ferrarias (blacksmiths), that directed their exports to the regional market. This dynamic environment was facilitated by Jews who escaped the Inquisition in Castile during the 15th century, and who stimulated the commercial, artisanal and cereal markets in the region.

After 60 years the Portuguese were able to end the Iberian Union with Spain. On 1 December 1640 the independence of Portugal was restored, allowing the ascension of the 8th Duke of Braganza (then military governor of Portugal) as King John IV. From 1640 to 1910 the House of Braganza was responsible for providing Portugal its kings and the two emperors of Brazil. The latter ruled from 1822 to 1889. The feudal castle of the dukes (built 1187) still remains.

By the 18th century there were several crises and failures in Bragança associated with tentative industrialization. Problems with agriculture in the beginning of the 19th century would also occur just when industrialists began to abandon the city of Bragança. Since then, the economy of the region has wavered through boom-and-bust cycles, stimulated by some national initiatives.

== Geography ==
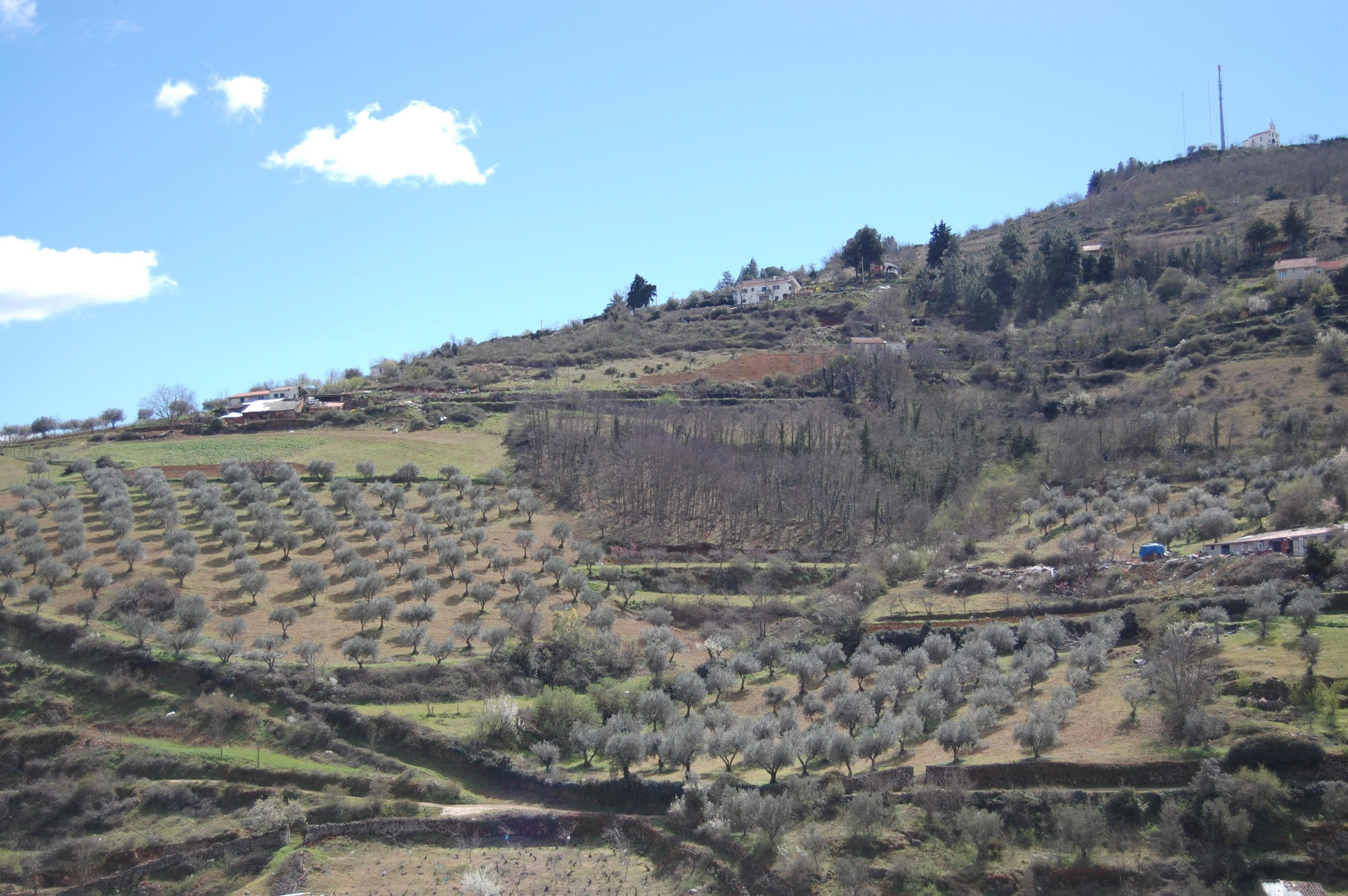
Olive trees along the slopes of Bragança

=== Physical geography ===
Bragança lies on a branch of the Sabor River south of the Culebra Mountains, 255 km northeast of Porto, 515 km from Lisbon and 22 km from the Spanish border.

==== Ecoregions/Protected areas ====
The municipality of Bragança is part of the frontier of the Montesinho Natural Park, established in 1979 to safeguard the distinct elements of the region. The creation of this ecoregion was made to preserve the existing qualities and allow human/cultural interaction. Montesinho is classified into forests and woods (oak and chestnut plantations at the base of the Coroa Mountains, the Tuela and lower Baceiro Rivers); wood and pine forests (forests and shrub vegetation in the western and eastern Rio Maças, Aveleda, Portelo/Montesinho, Mofreito/Montouto, Pinheiros, Serrea da Coroa, Vilar Seco da Lomba); a sub-Atlantic mixed farming area (around the Tuela and Baceiro Rivers); open space that allows farming along the plateaus of Baçal, Aveleda, Onor, Deilão); and the granite mountains of oak and birch species, mainly within the park and Pinheiros area.

=== Climate ===
Bragança features a warm-summer Mediterranean climate (Köppen: Csb, Trewartha: Csbk) influenced by the distance from the coast and the elevation, thus with cooler winters and shorter warm summers.

The average high in the coldest month – January – is around 9.1 °C (48 °F) while the July high is around 29.2 °C (85 °F). The January average low hovers around the freezing point. It has been known to snow in April, and winter temperatures can fall to as low as −11.6 °C (11 °F), as recorded in February 1983, at around which time the station of a local institute on the outskirts of the city also recorded −17.5 °C. Frosts happen on average 53 days per year. The annual mean is around 13 °C (55 °F). The mean total rainfall in a year is 784 mm (30.9 in). The year of 2005 was particularly dry in Portugal, and Bragança suffered water shortages and devastating forest fires in the rural areas.

Climate data for Bragança (1991-2020), elevation: 690 m or 2,260 ft
Month	Jan	Feb	Mar	Apr	May	Jun	Jul	Aug	Sep	Oct	Nov	Dec	Year
Record high °C (°F)	20.4 (68.7)	22.2 (72.0)	26.6 (79.9)	28.6 (83.5)	33.6 (92.5)	38.4 (101.1)	38.8 (101.8)	39.7 (103.5)	37.9 (100.2)	32.1 (89.8)	22.0 (71.6)	17.2 (63.0)	39.7 (103.5)
Mean daily maximum °C (°F)	9.1 (48.4)	11.8 (53.2)	15.2 (59.4)	17.1 (62.8)	21.2 (70.2)	26.2 (79.2)	29.2 (84.6)	28.8 (83.8)	25.1 (77.2)	18.9 (66.0)	12.8 (55.0)	9.7 (49.5)	18.9 (66.0)
Daily mean °C (°F)	4.8 (40.6)	6.3 (43.3)	9.3 (48.7)	11.3 (52.3)	14.8 (58.6)	19.0 (66.2)	21.7 (71.1)	21.4 (70.5)	18.3 (64.9)	13.4 (56.1)	8.2 (46.8)	5.4 (41.7)	12.9 (55.2)
Mean daily minimum °C (°F)	0.4 (32.7)	0.8 (33.4)	3.4 (38.1)	5.4 (41.7)	8.4 (47.1)	11.9 (53.4)	14.1 (57.4)	13.8 (56.8)	11.3 (52.3)	7.9 (46.2)	3.6 (38.5)	1.1 (34.0)	6.9 (44.4)
Record low °C (°F)	−9.0 (15.8)	−9.2 (15.4)	−10.2 (13.6)	−3.4 (25.9)	−2.0 (28.4)	2.3 (36.1)	4.5 (40.1)	5.4 (41.7)	2.1 (35.8)	−1.9 (28.6)	−8.6 (16.5)	−9.7 (14.5)	−10.2 (13.6)
Average precipitation mm (inches)	100.6 (3.96)	62.4 (2.46)	68.6 (2.70)	68.0 (2.68)	63.4 (2.50)	32.2 (1.27)	15.1 (0.59)	18.7 (0.74)	43.9 (1.73)	106.9 (4.21)	91.8 (3.61)	112.3 (4.42)	783.9 (30.86)
Average precipitation days (≥ 1.0 mm)	10.6	7.4	8.4	9.1	8.4	3.9	2.2	2.7	4.7	9.7	9.5	9.6	86.3
Mean monthly sunshine hours	111.6	152.2	195.4	204.0	256.7	299.5	332.7	307.9	263.0	169.4	125.0	106.1	2,481.1
Source 1: IPMA
Source 2: Météo Climat 1991-2020 (sunshine values) "Moyennes 1991/2020 Braganca". Baseline climate means (1991–2020) from stations all over the world. Météo Climat.

=== Human geography ===
Population of Bragança (1801 - 2011)
Year	Pop.	±%
1801	27,961	—
1849	16,929	−39.5%
1900	30,513	+80.2%
1930	29,750	−2.5%
1960	37,553	+26.2%
1981	35,380	−5.8%
1991	33,055	−6.6%
2001	34,750	+5.1%
2011	35,341	+1.7%

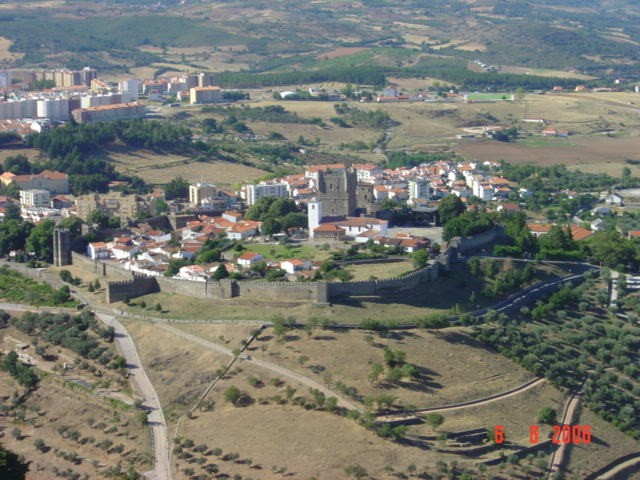
A perspective of the settlements around the base of the Castle of Bragança

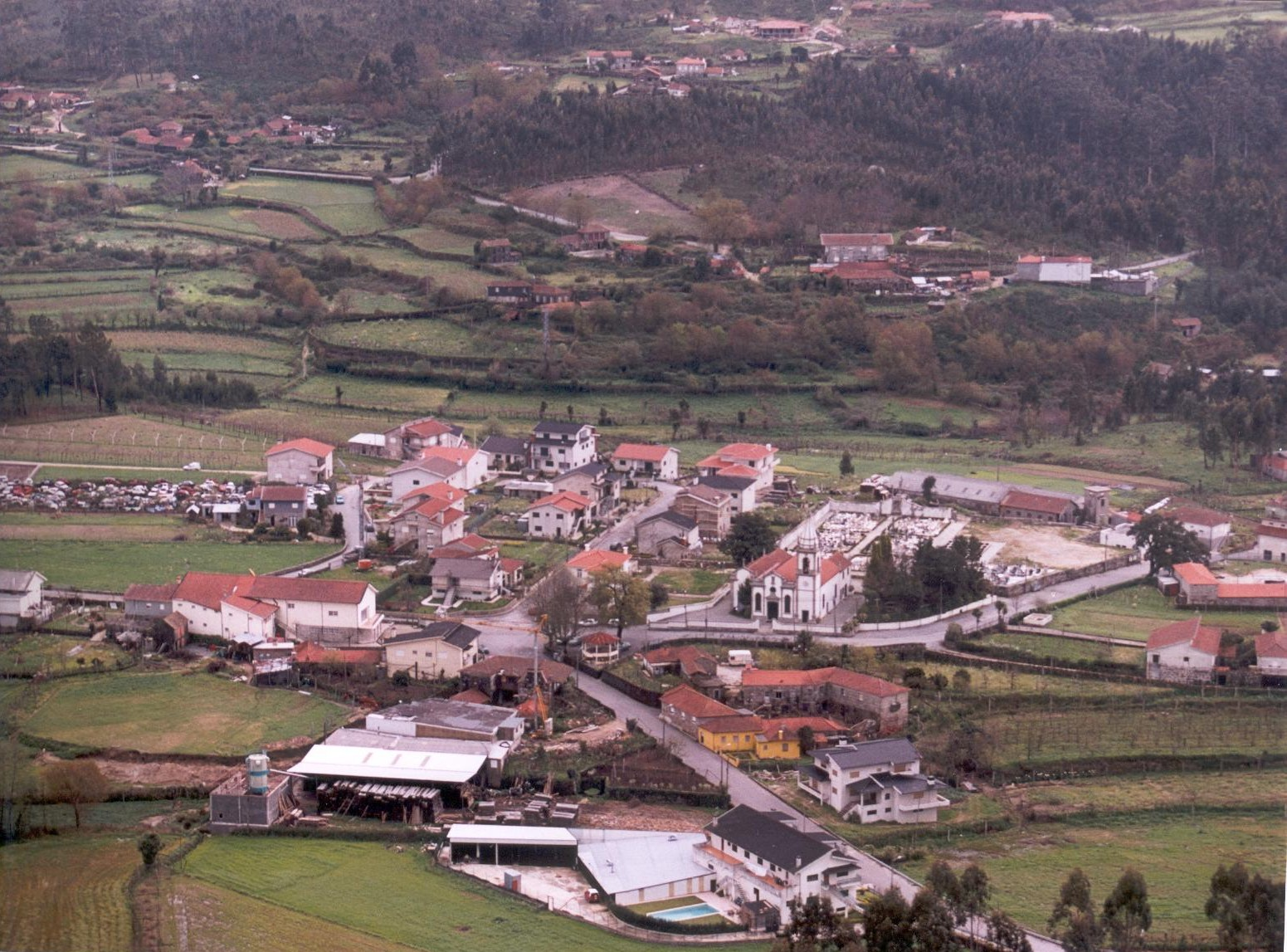
The parish of Parada on the periphery of the municipality of Bragança

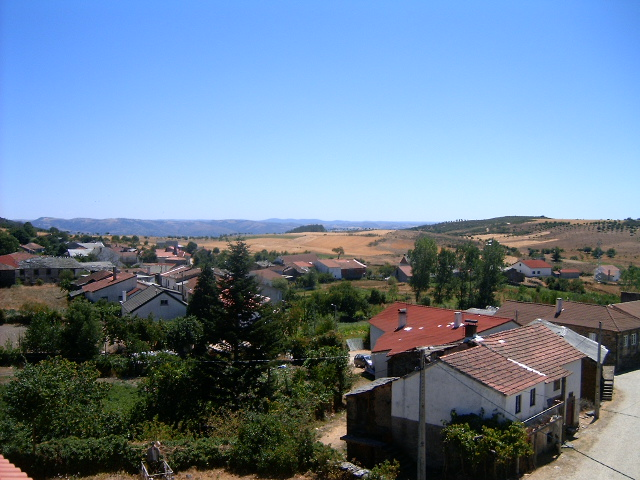
The rural scenery of the parish of Carragosa

Of the 18 Portuguese historical district capitals, Bragança is the farthest from Lisbon, the national capital.

The seat of the municipality is the city of Bragança, which consists of the parish Sé, Santa Maria e Meixedo, and had a population of 20,309 in 2001. In the hierarchy of Portuguese urban communities, Bragança is only second to Chaves in the sub-region of the Alto Trás-os-Montes. Historically, the municipality has seen a demographic evolution. Between 1911 and 1991, there has been a 6.80% (1655 inhabitant) increase, mitigated by annual changes that both saw growth and decreases. For example, between 1981 and 1991 there was an exodus from the interior of the region of young people, resulting in a drop of population and birth rates (which only helped the coastal communities of Portugal). The city of Bragança has generally seen positive growth, being the capital of the region, and attracting a more youthful component. Sé and Santa Maria, the two primarily urban parishes, benefited directly from this, becoming the dynamic engine of growth in the territory, and developing into a pole in the interior northeast.

Bragança pertains to an area referred to as the Terra Fria Transmontana (Cold Transmontana Lands). Within the NUTS nomenclature, Bragança is part of the Terras de Trás-os-Montes subregion, along with eight other municipalities. Its connection to this region are formalized within various associations, including the Associação de Municípios de Trás-os-Montes e Alto Douro (Municipal Association of Tr's-os Montes and Alto Douro), as part of the Associação de Municípios da Terra Fria (constituted by the municipalities of Bragança, Vinhais, Vimioso and Miranda do Douro), the Associação Comercial e Industrial de Bragança (Commercial Association of Bragança), the district Núcleo Empresarial do Distrito de Bragança (Business Nucleus of the District of Bragança), the Região de Turismo do Nordeste Transmontano (Tourist Region of Nordeste Transmontano) and the Parque Natural de Montesinho (Montesinho Natural Park). Bragança is also affiliated with the Associação do Pacto do Eixo Atlântico, along with 17 municipalities in the northwest peninsula, whose objective is to implement policy that strategically support socio-economic and socio-cultural objectives of the communities along the Portuguese-Spanish border region with Galicia. This is an important political relationship since 1999, as Bragança is of significant size to motivate economic activity in the northern portion of the Iberian Peninsula. Its peripheral place in the urban hierarchy of Portugal has contributed to the political, administrative and populational concentration of many regional and national associations, administrative delegations and regional directorates The neighbouring municipalities are Vimioso in the southeast, Macedo de Cavaleiros in the southwest and Vinhais in the west.

Since the 2013 administration reform, it is administratively divided into 39 civil parishes:

- Alfaião
- Aveleda e Rio de Onor
- Babe
- Baçal
- Carragosa
- Castrelos e Carrazedo
- Castro de Avelãs
- Coelhoso
- Donai
- Espinhosela
- França
- Gimonde
- Gondesende
- Gostei
- Grijó de Parada
- Izeda, Calvelhe e Paradinha Nova
- Macedo do Mato
- Mós
- Nogueira
- Outeiro
- Parada e Failde
- Parâmio
- Pinela
- Quintanilha
- Quintela de Lampaças
- Rabal
- Rebordainhos e Pombares
- Rebordãos
- Rio Frio e Milhão
- Salsas
- Samil
- Santa Comba de Rossas
- São Julião de Palácios e Deilão
- São Pedro de Sarracenos
- Sé, Santa Maria e Meixedo
- Sendas
- Serapicos
- Sortes
- Zoio

==== International relations ====
The municipality of Bragança is twinned with:

- Zamora, Castile and León, Spain (1984);
- León, Castile and León, Spain.

== Economy ==
Bragança is a city of services with a dependence on state-run institutions like the Polytechnic Institute of Bragança and the regional hospital for jobs. In the turn of the 21st century, its countryside suffered a population decline with the abandonment of the villages and the aging of the rural population. The city of Bragança is an anchor of the regional economy, resisting the desertification of the hinterland, and concentrating public sector administration in the region. In Bragança, approximately 16% of the population is involved in the secondary industrial sector, while 60% are associated with the tertiary service sector, alluding to a problem in attracting investments in the secondary sector. Employment is primarily driven by the tertiary sector, including commerce, restaurants and hotels, but also civil construction (which is the second largest employer of local residents). Although there has been a positive evolution, industrial activities still remain weak, hindered by the evolution of the market in this periferic borderland region of Portugal. Due to its location near the Spanish border, the city receives tourists from Zamora, León, Salamanca, Asturias and elsewhere. Agribusiness is focused on olive oil, grains, chestnut and livestock, especially sheep.

=== Transportation ===
Located eight kilometres from the city centre, the municipal/regional airport (Bragança Airport), with scheduled flights by Sevenair Air Services to Lisbon (LIS) and Vila Real (VRL). Bragança Airport is located north of the city, in the parish of Aveleda, accessible by taxi or bus route. The aerodrome was expanded and the runway enlarged, including new navigational systems, new lighting and support facilities, in order to increase mid-size aircraft to be on par with other European regional airports.

Bragança is one of the two (along with Viseu) district capitals without a rail service in Portugal. There was formerly a metre-gauge railway (the Tua line) from Bragança to Tua, for connecting trains to Porto. Bragança station (and the Bragança-Mirandela section of the railway) closed in 1991. Bragança is located about 35 km away from the Sanabria AV high-speed railway station, part of the Olmedo-Zamora-Galicia high-speed rail line. With 35,341 people, Bragança is the largest potential market in the station's surroundings. There are discussions about the possibility of a connecting motorway between Bragança and the area served by the station.

There are three main accessways within the municipality: the A4, IP2 and the N103 motorways. The principal roadway connecting Bragança and local communities is the A4: Amarante-Vila Real-Bragança-Quintanilha, which crosses the municipalities southwest border towards Bragança, before circling the city in the direction of the eastern border with Spain. The ancillary IP2 meets the A4 around Macedo de Cavaleiros and the N103 crosses from west to east, meeting in Bragança, before continuing as the N218 into Spain. Other roads connect nearby municipalities such as Mirandela, Penafiel, in addition to Chaves, Valpaços and Miranda do Douro, including the towns of Vinhais and Vimioso.

== Architecture ==
Notable landmarks in the city include the 12th-century Domus Municipalis in Romanesque style, the Renaissance cathedral, and the old town walls, which are still well preserved, and look down on the river and the modern city.

== Education ==
The student population of Bragança is heavily concentrated within the town, its population for 1999–2000 being 14,406 registered students. Of this number the largest frequency of students were enrolled in the state-run higher-education technical college (polytechnic institute): the Instituto Politécnico de Bragança (IPB). Since its formation in 1986, there has been a significant growth in enrollment (200, 4000 and 4731, in the 1986–87, 1998–99, and 1999–2000 school years, respectively). The remaining higher-education enrollees are dispersed at the Instituto Superior de Línguas e Administração (Superior Institute of Languages and Administration) and Escola Superior de Enfermagem (Superior School of Nursing). Other institutions of education include 4,650 students enrolled in secondary and junior high schools, 874 in technical/professional schools, 2,868 in primary schools, and 614 in pre-school programs.

In many villages there are not enough children to maintain the rural schools, which are gradually being closed by the Portuguese government.

== Sports ==
The Grupo Desportivo de Bragança (abbreviated as GD Bragança) is a Portuguese sports club based in Bragança which hosts both a football department and an athletics department. The club was founded in 1943 and its men's football team plays its home matches at the Municipal de Bragança stadium with 5,000 seats.

== Religion ==
Bragança pertains to the Diocese of Bragança-Miranda, a suffragan of the Archdiocese of Braga.

In June 1928, a synagogue was inaugurated in the city.

== Notable citizens ==
- Mendo Alão (c. 1000; Brittany — c. 1050 in Bragança), nobleman and medieval knight who lived in Bragança (and friend of King Alfonso VI of León and Castile), clergy at the Monastery of São Salvador in Castro de Avelãs;
- Francisco de Moraes (c. 1500 – 1572) writer and personal secretary to the Portuguese ambassador in France;
- Isaac Orobio de Castro (c. 1617 – 1687) Portuguese Jewish philosopher, physician and religious apologist;
- Jacob de Castro Sarmento (1690 – 1762) estrangeirado, physician, naturalist, poet and Deist;
- Henrique Callado (1920–2001) Portuguese equestrian, competed in five consecutive Olympic Games;
- António José Rafael (1925–2018) Roman Catholic bishop of Bragança-Miranda, 1979 to 2001;
- Jorge Gomes (born 1951) businessman and politician and Secretary of State of Internal Administration;
- Luís Miguel Afonso Fernandes (born 1989), known as Pizzi, footballer with almost 400 club caps and 17 for Portugal.
