= Terras de Trás-os-Montes =

- Intermunicipal community
- Logo
- Interactive map of Terras de Trás-os-Montes
- Location in Portugal
- Coordinates: 41.63°N 6.90°W
- Country: Portugal
- Region: Northern Portugal
- Seat: Bragança
- Municipalities: 9

Area
  - Total: 5,543.61 km^{2} (2,140.40 sq mi)

Population (2011)
  - Total: 117,527
  - Density: 21.2004/km^{2} (54.9089/sq mi)
- Time zone: UTC+00:00 (WET)
  - Summer (DST): UTC+01:00 (WEST)
- Website: cim-ttm.pt

The Comunidade Intermunicipal das Terras de Trás-os-Montes (Portuguese pronunciation: [ˈtɛʁɐʒ ðɨ ˌtɾaz uʒ ˈmõtɨʃ]; Mirandese: Tierras de Trás ls Montes; English: Lands of Trás-os-Montes) is an administrative division in northeastern Portugal. Since January 2015, Terras de Trás-os-Montes is also a NUTS3 subregion of Norte Region, that covers the same area as the intermunicipal community. The seat of the intermunicipal community is Bragança. Terras de Trás-os-Montes comprises a large part of the district of Bragança. The population in 2011 was 117,527, in an area of 5,543.61 km^{2}.

== Municipalities ==
The intermunicipal community of Terras de Trás-os-Montes consists of 9 municipalities:

Municipality	Population (2011)	Area (km^{2})
Alfândega da Fé	5,104	321.95
Bragança	35,341	1173.57
Macedo de Cavaleiros	15,776	699.14
Miranda do Douro	7,482	487.18
Mirandela	23,850	658.96
Mogadouro	9,542	760.65
Vila Flor	6,697	265.81
Vimioso	4,669	481.59
Vinhais	9,066	694.76
Total	117,527	5,543.61
