= Governor Rodrigues =

Governor Rodrigues may refer to:

- Diogo Rodrigues (died 1577), Governor of Salsette from 1535 to 1548
- Sarmento Rodrigues (1899–1979), Governor of Portuguese Guinea from 1946 to 1949, Governor General of Salazar from, 1950 to 1951, Governor General of Portuguese Mozambique from 1961 to 1964
