= Governor Barreto =

Governor Barreto may refer to:

- Francisco Barreto (1520–1573), Governor of Portuguese India from 1555 to 1558
- Honório Barreto (1813–1859), Governor of Portuguese Guinea from 1834 to 1835, from 1846 to 1848, and in 1852
