= Freixo de Espada à Cinta railway station =

Closed railway station in Portugal

Freixo de Espada à Cinta Station Estação Ferroviária de Freixo de Espada à Cinta
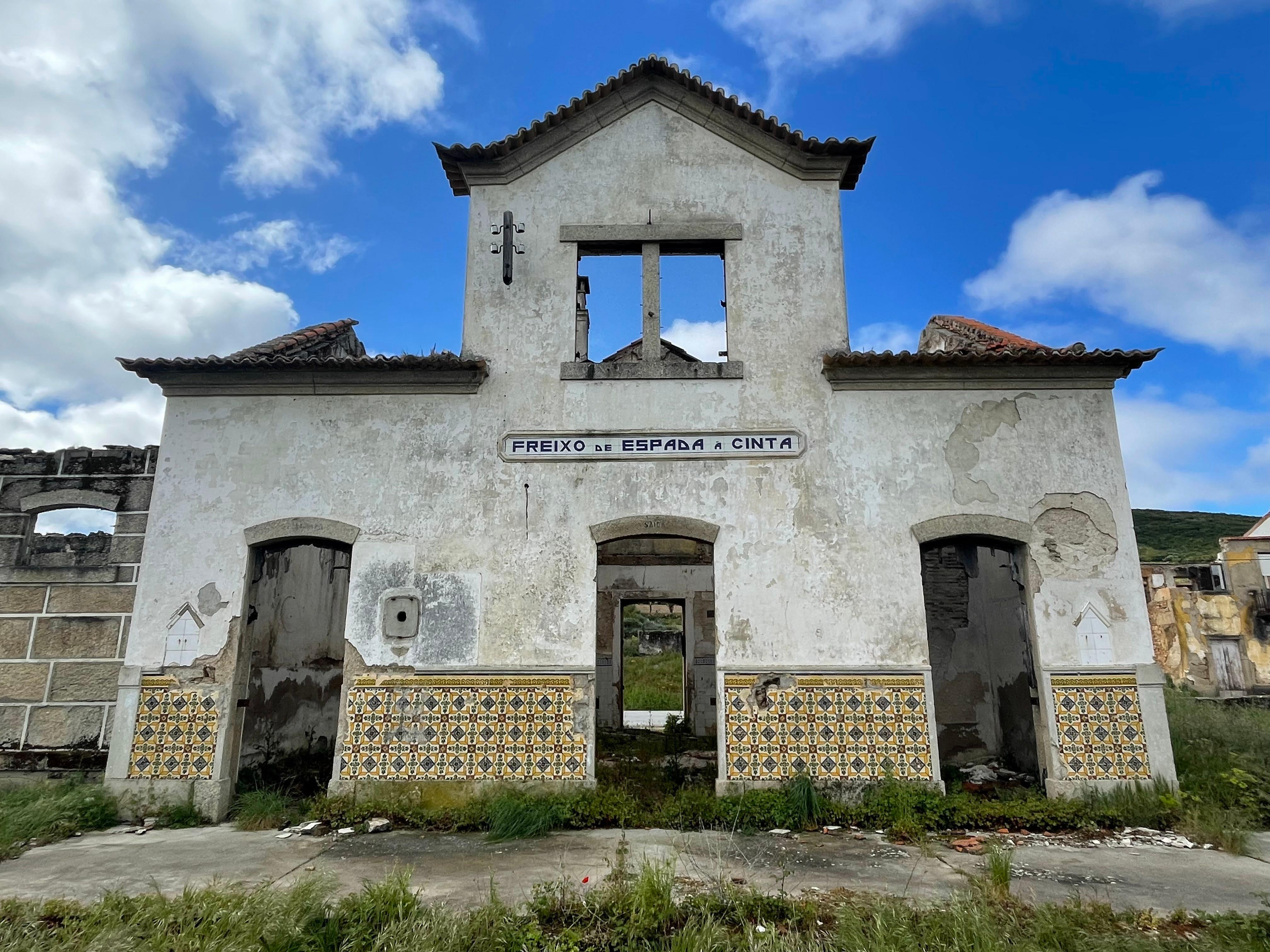
- Facade of the main building of the Freixo de Espada à Cinta station, in 2023

General information
- Location: Freixo de Espada à Cinta; Portugal
- Coordinates: 41°10′47.5″N 6°47′57.1″W
- Elevation: 620 m (2,030 ft)
- Line: Sabor line (1927-1988)
- Connections: Fornos - Sabor; Macieirinha

Other information
- Classification: Station
- Website: https://arqueologia.patrimoniocultural.pt/index.php?sid=sitios&subsid=2149799

History
- Opened: 6 July 1927
- Closed: 1 August 1988
Location
- Location within Portugal

The Freixo de Espada à Cinta railway station was a station on the Sabor line, which nominally served the town of Freixo de Espada à Cinta, located 19km away, in the Bragança District of Portugal.

== History ==
Construction and opening

In July 1926, it was reported that work was to resume on the Sabor line on the section beyond Carviçais, after a long period of interruption. By this time, several stations had already been completed for several years, including the one at Freixo de Espada à Cinta. The passenger building was located on the southeast side of the track. The section between Carviçais and Lagoaça opened for service on July 6, 1927.

Road connections

Between 1931 and 1935, the Junta Autónoma das Estradas connected this station to the town of Freixo de Espada à Cinta (today's EN220), shortening the distance by road to 19 km.

== Closure ==
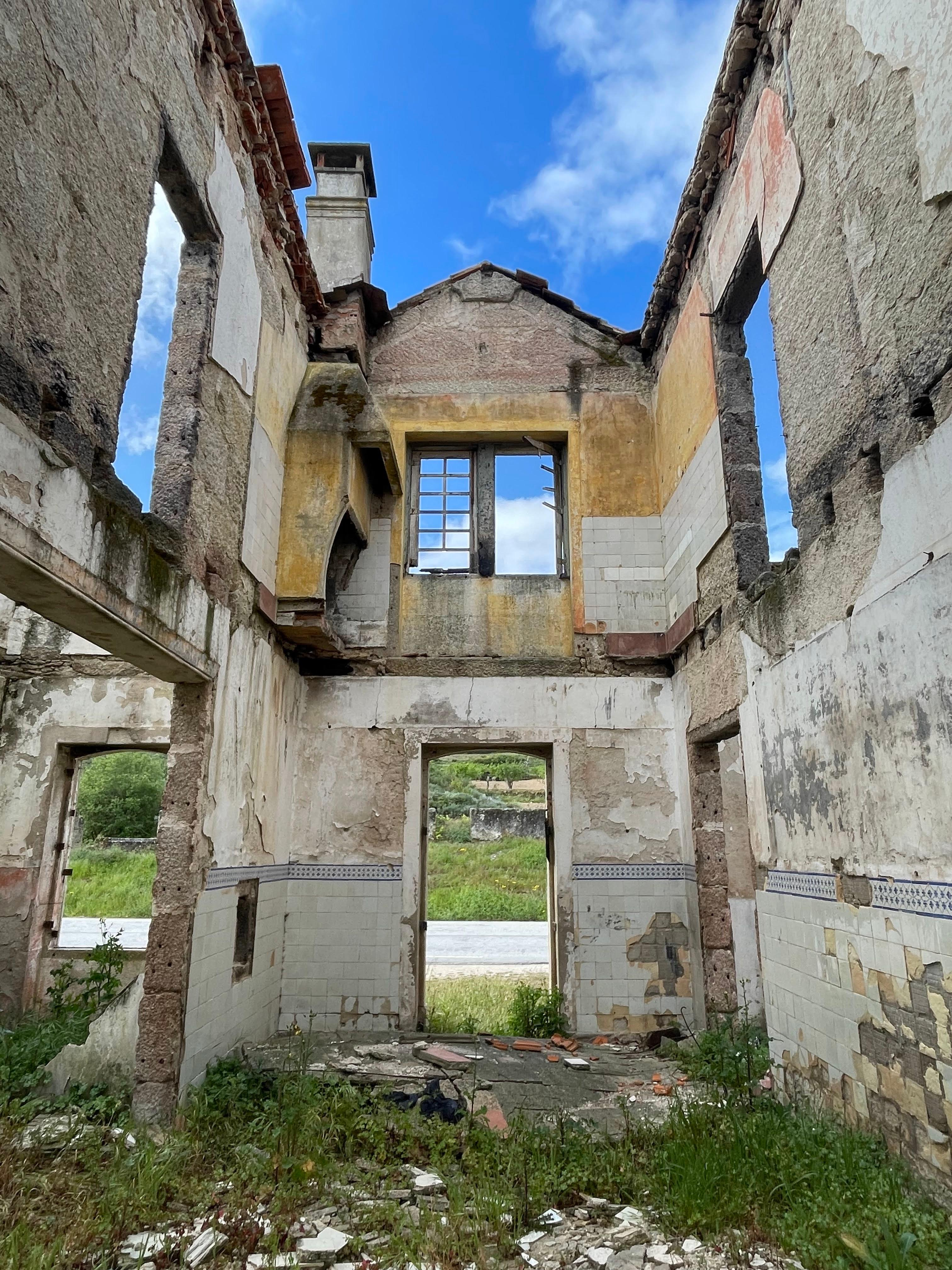
Interior of the station

The line and the station were closed on the 1 August 1988.

The roof collapsed between 2014 and 2018 and the station is currently completely abandoned and on a high level of decay.
