= Casa-Museu Guerra Junqueiro =

Coordinates: 41°08′33″N 8°36′38″W

Museum-Residence of Guerra Junqueiro
- Casa-Museu Guerra Junqueiro
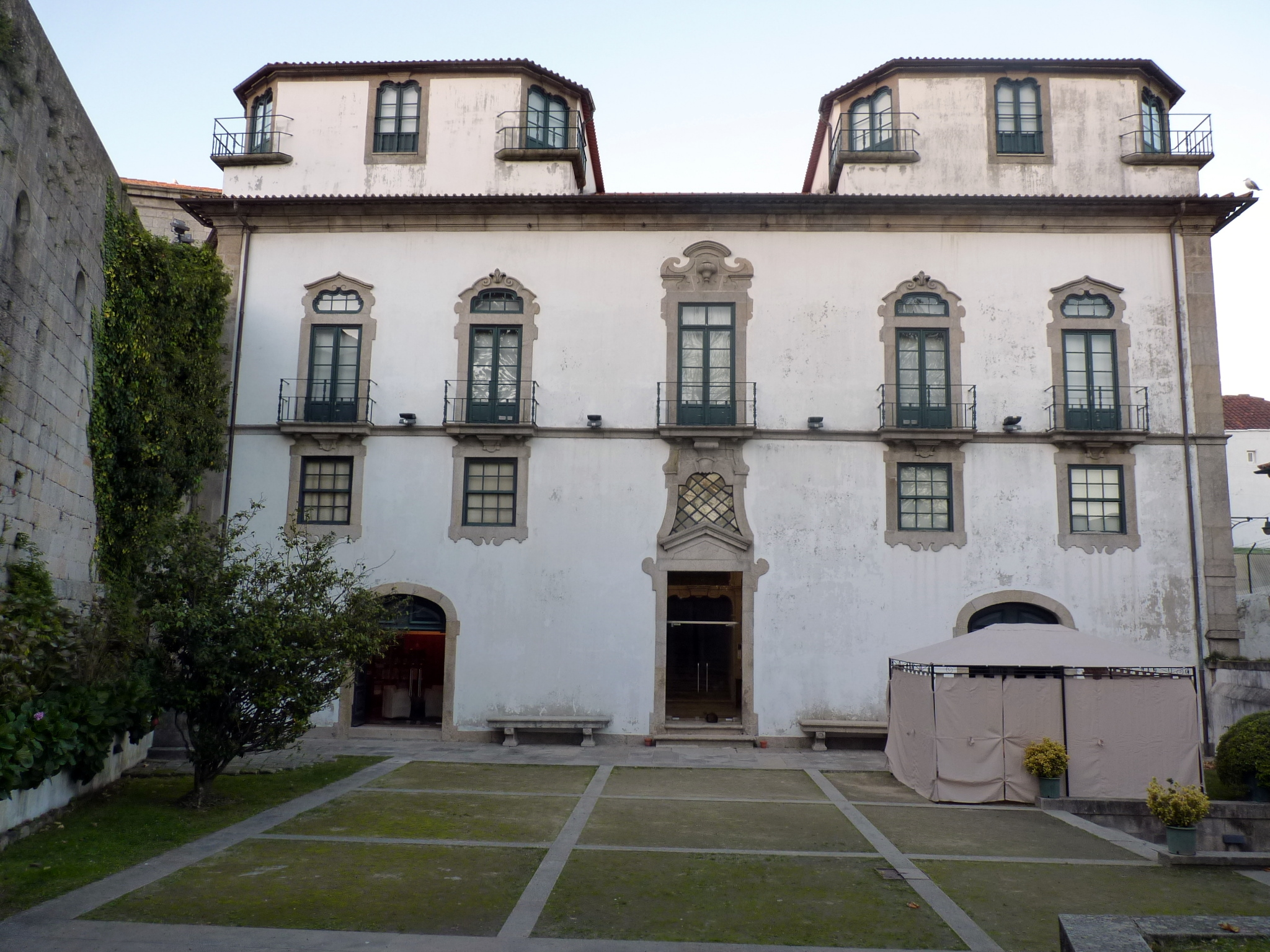
- The front facade of the Museum-Residence of Guerra Junqueiro

General information
- Type: Residential-Museum
- Architectural style: Baroque
- Location: Cedofeita, Santo Ildefonso, Sé, Miragaia, São Nicolau e Vitória, Porto, Portugal
- Opened: 18th century
- Owner: Portuguese Republic

Technical details
- Material: Granite

Design and construction
- Architect: Nicolau Nasoni

The Museum-Residence of Guerra Junqueiro (Portuguese: Casa-Museu Guerra Junqueiro) is a former-residence and museum located in the civil parish of Cedofeita, Santo Ildefonso, Sé, Miragaia, São Nicolau e Vitória, in the Portuguese north, municipality of Porto, classified as a Imóvel de Interesse Público (Property of Public Interest).

== History ==
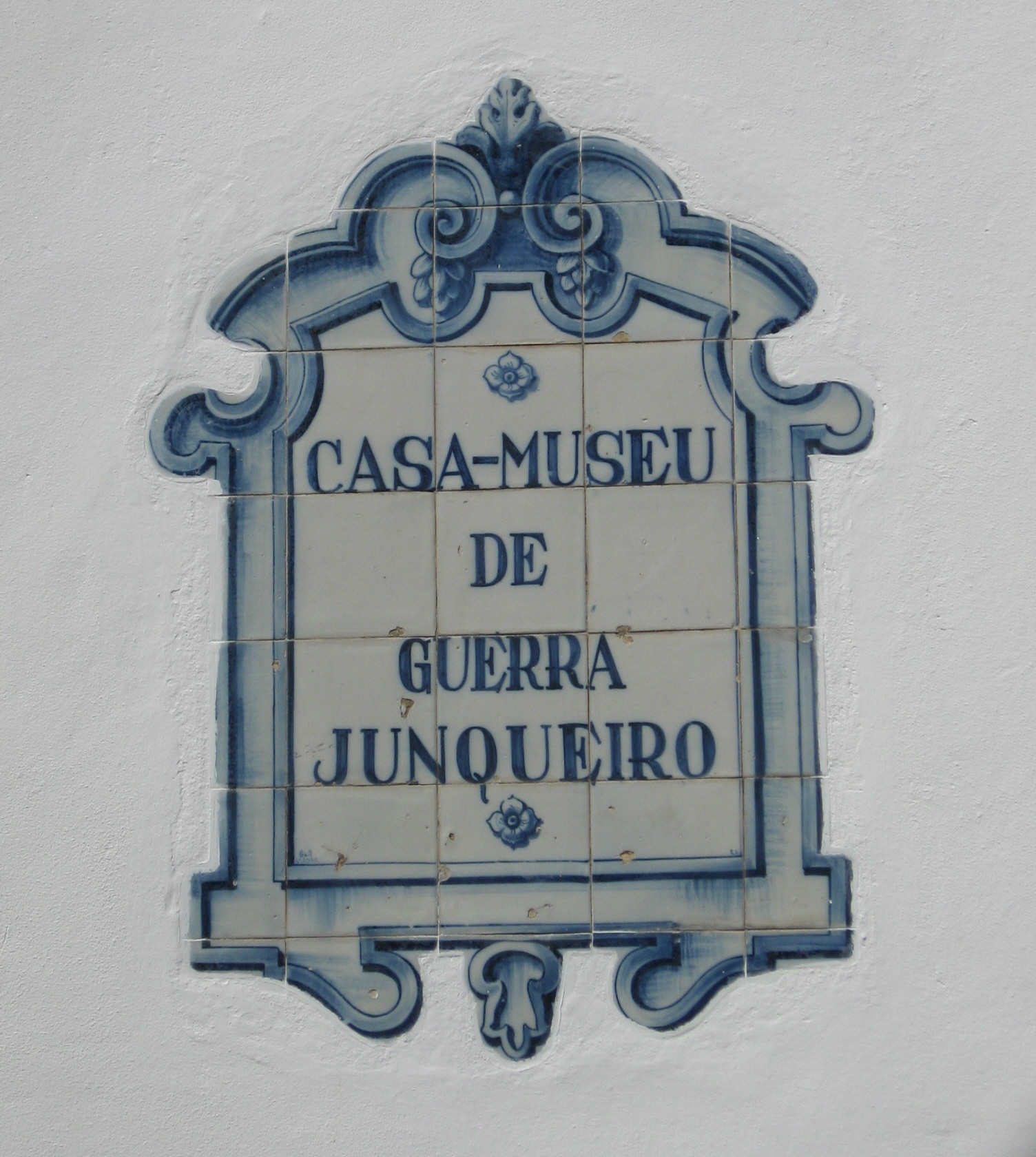
The azulejo sign marking the residence/museum

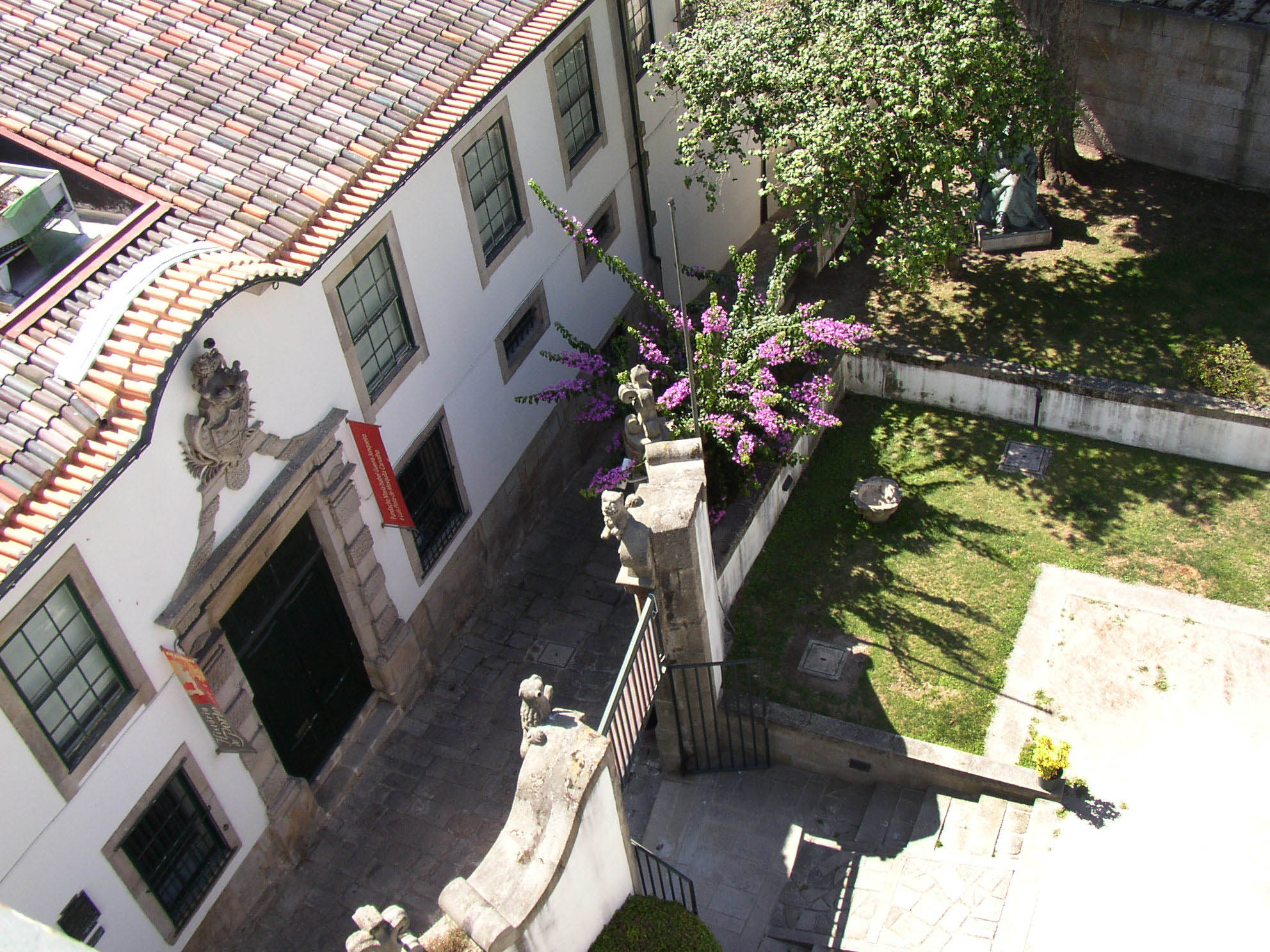
A view of the entrance to the residence and courtyard

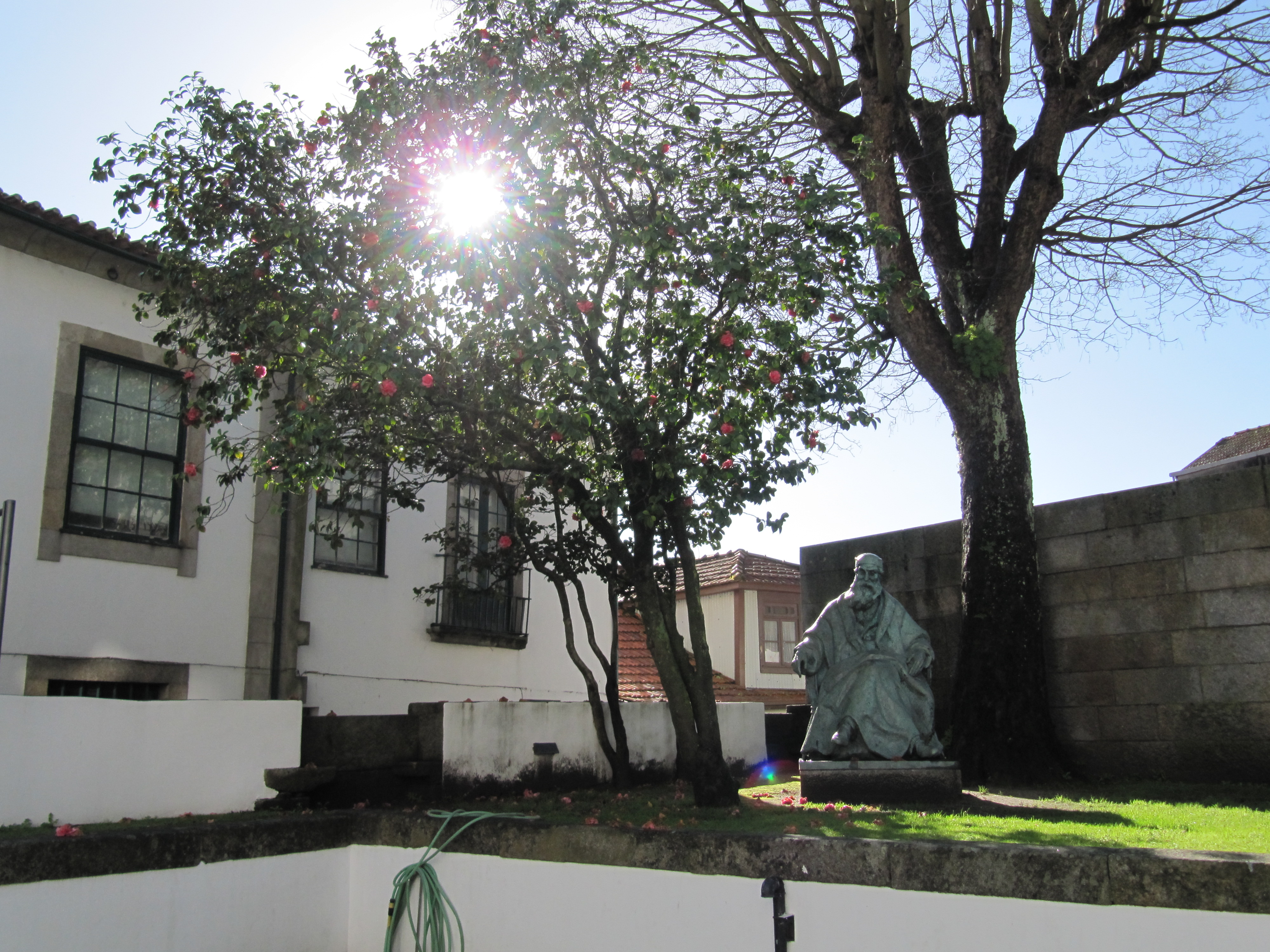
The bronze statue of Guerra Junqueira (1850-1923) by Leopoldo De-Almeida and courtyard at the entrance to the museum-residence

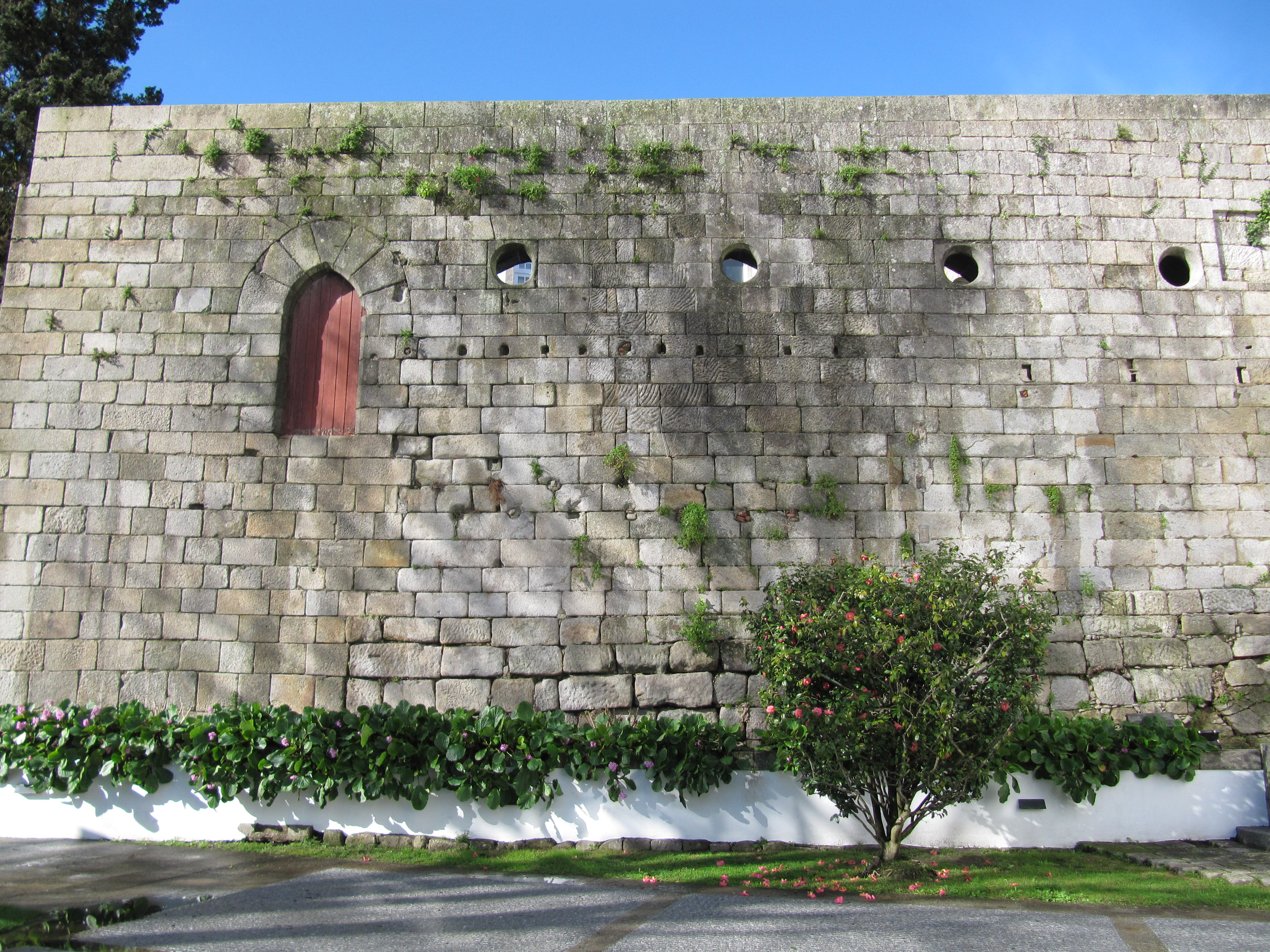
The sparse lateral facade of the museum

Between 1730 and 1746, the house was built by the order of Domingos Barbosa, magisterial deacon of the Sé Cathedral of Porto. Traditionally, the work was attributed to Nicolau Nasoni, but has been recently revised based on new studies which suggest that António Pereira, who worked in Porto during the same time, was the original architect. In reality, it is difficult to determine which of the architects was attributed to either of the Italian architects; similar problems are behind the Palácio de São João Novo which was originally attributed to Nasoni, but after examination was attributed to António Pereira. The similar facades of the residence Dr. Domingos Barbosa and the Palácio de São João Novo made investigators attribute the first to António Pereira.

Following his death, the house became the property of Manuel Barbosa de Albuquerque, his brother, who nominated his descendant and nephew, Fernando Barbosa de Albuquerque as its successor.

On 15 September 1850, Abílio Manuel Guerra Junqueiro was born in Freixo de Espada-à-Cinta.

Between the later 19th and the 20th centuries, the property was passed between various descendants of D. Sancha Augusta de Lemos Barbosa e Albuquerque: she was succeeded by Francisco de Sales Pinto de Mesquita Carvalho, her nephew in 1908, then the descendants of Francisco Sales Pinto de Mesquita (in 1934). It was the last whom D. Maria Isabel Guerra Junqueiro, the widow of Luís Augusto Pinto de Mesquita Carvalho (brother of Francisco de Sales Pinto de Mesquita Carvalho), acquired the home to install the collections of his father (Guerra Junqueiro). In 1940, D. Maria Isabel along with her mother, Filomena Neves donated the home to the municipal hall of Porto, that included the home and collection of her father's works at the museum (approximately 600 works). In 1942, the re-imagined museum was re-opened to the public, that included many of furniture, sculptures, Nuremberg plates and ceramics.

Between 1991 and 1992, the building was expanded, under the authorship of architect Alcino Soutinho. A similar expansion occurred in 1996, but this time archeological excavations were undertake. Between 1994 and 1997, the Museum-Residence was remodeled under the direction of Alcino Soutinho, to install a temporary exposition hall, a small auditorium and shop.
