= Fornos (Freixo de Espada à Cinta) =

- Civil parish
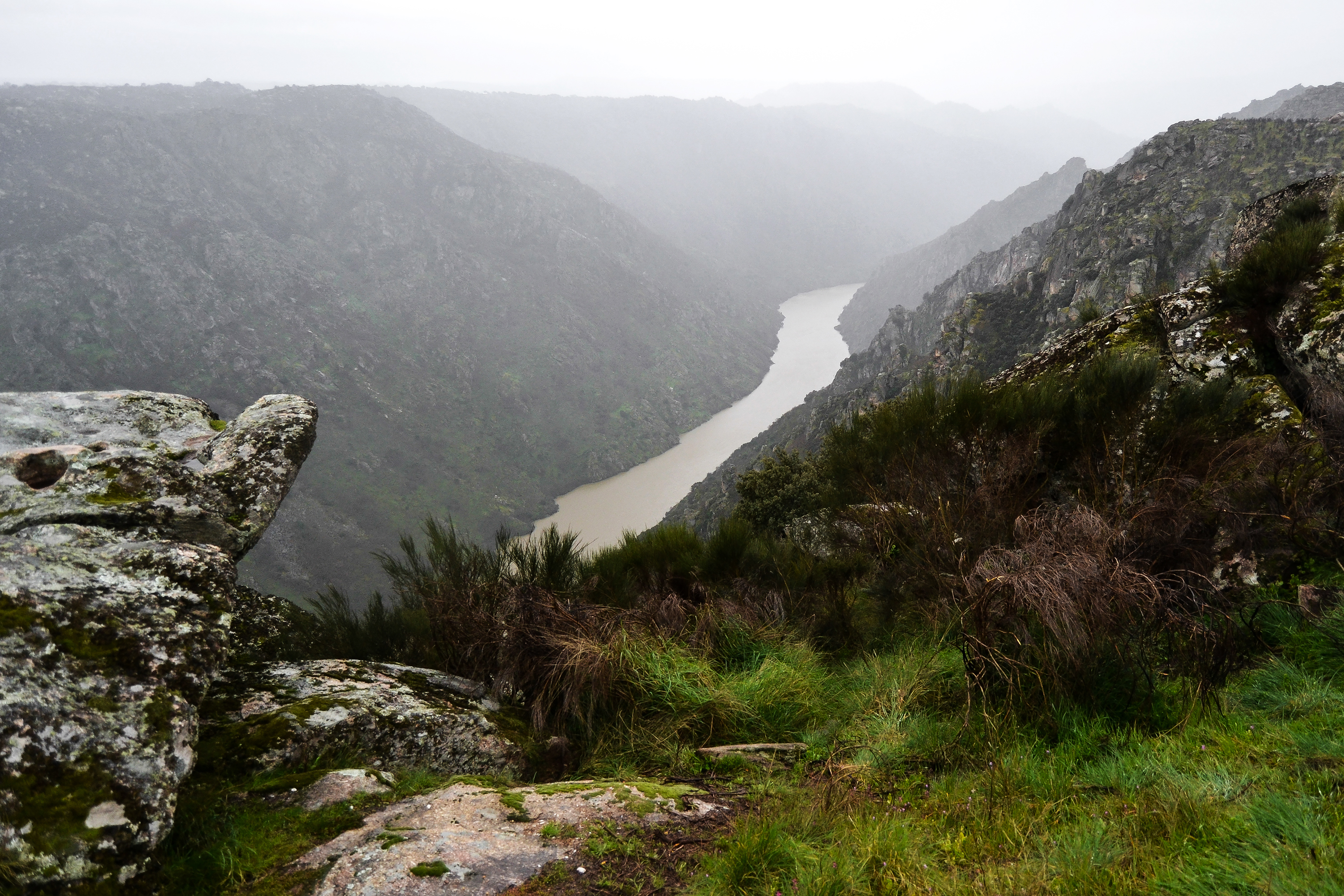
- Carrascalinho Viewpoint within the International Douro Natural Park

- Location in Portugal
- Coordinates: 41°10′23″N 6°46′20″W
- Country: Portugal
- Region: Norte
- Intermunic. comm.: Douro
- District: Bragança
- Municipality: Freixo de Espada à Cinta
- Established: Settlement: fl. 1600
- Disbanded: 2013

Area
  - Total: 28.67 km^{2} (11.07 sq mi)
- Elevation: 694 m (2,277 ft)

Population (2001)
  - Total: 418
  - Density: 14.6/km^{2} (37.8/sq mi)
- Time zone: UTC+00:00 (WET)
  - Summer (DST): UTC+01:00 (WEST)
- Postal code: 5180-028

Fornos (Portuguese pronunciation: [ˈfɔɾnuʃ]) is a former civil parish in the municipality of Freixo de Espada à Cinta, Portugal. In 2013, the parish merged into the new parish Lagoaça e Fornos. It is located 17 kilometres south of the municipal seat, in the northeast of Portugal. In 2001 its population was 418 inhabitants, in an area of 28.67 km^{2} (11.07 sq mi) bordering the Spanish border along the Douro River.

== History ==
Early references to the parish refer to the existence of ancient kilns used in the production of ceramic pottery.

The land was probably inhabited before record-keeping was begun, and is substantiated by the discovery of a granite-sculpted pig (likely a wild boar) that was discovered by abbot Tavares in Escouradal. This was during a period when an ecclesiastical vicarage under the authority of the archpriest ad nutum from the religious college in Freixo de Espada à Cinta governed the lands in this region.

In 1644, during the Portuguese Restoration War, it was looted by the Spanish army, along with the neighbouring parish of Lagoaça. Between 26 June 1896 and 13 January 1898, Fornos was incorporated into the municipality of Torre de Moncorvo, along with the municipality of Freixo de Espada à Cinta.

== Geography ==
Fornos is crossed by the E.N.221 national roadway, which bisects the parish in the northwest corner (from southwest to northeast). The roads of the main village run perpendicular to the E.N.221, such as the Rua do Calvário and Rua Nova (the roadway where the main clock-tower is located), Rua da Igreja, Largo do Terreiro do Santo, Largo do Senhor da Rua Nova and Rua do Santo (where the Chapel of Santo António and historical fountain is located). The community was formerly served by the Sabor line, a narrow gauge railway which closed in 1988.

The belvedere of Carrascalinho is a popular physical attraction in the village: it has a panoramic vista of the Douro river, that includes the river valley and the extensions of the Spanish province of Salamanca. In reality, much (two-thirds) of the parish is included within the International Douro Natural Park, which stretches down the eastern border region of the municipality of Freixo de Espada à Cinta.

== Economy ==
The principal activity in Fornos is agriculture: its settlers work in the fields, towards the cultivation of cereal crops, potato, olives and the production of olive oil, in addition to herding (particularly dairy and sheep).

== Architecture ==
- Matriz Church - which was constructed in 1609 to the invocation of Santa Eulália, is a rustic building with main bell-tower with double bells.

== Culture ==
The principal celebration in the parish is dedicated to the Senhor da Rua Nova, which occurs annually on the first Sunday of September.
