= Donatary captain =

Former Portuguese colonial official

A donatary captain was a Portuguese colonial official to whom the Crown granted jurisdiction, rights and revenues over some colonial territory. The recipient of these grants was called a donatário (donatary), because he had been given the grant as a doação (donation) by the king, often as a reward for service.

The term also applied as the rank of the field officer that was in charge of a captaincy's territorial militia, called ordenanças in Portuguese, a military unit which existed from the 16th to the 19th centuries.

== Captaincy system ==
Due to the impossibility of exercising direct control and sovereignty over overseas territories, the captain-major was the channel by which the monarch could delegate his powers, with certain restrictions, under the responsibility of persons in whom he confided. The donatário could administer, on behalf of the Sovereign, the lands to which he was assigned, with all the regalia, rights and obligations, with the exception of certain limits, including military authority over soldiers and detachments of the crown, or the administration of justice.

The captains were agents nominated by the donatary or, after 1495, by the Portuguese Crown, to a lifetime title that was passed down to the "legitimate male heirs". As administrators, the captain-majors enjoyed various judicial and economic privileges that provided an incentive to settle and develop their captaincies. They had the authority to administer sentences, with the exception of those involving penalties of death or mutilation. Economically, they had the exclusive authority to mill, bake bread and sell salt, in addition to their entitlement to receive rent paid to the King for lands, fees and due taxes. In addition, they could receive a tithe paid to the captaincy directly. In addition to the regalia of office, the captains-major were entitled to the best parcels of land, and had the capability, on behalf of the Crown, to contract renters to the donatárias (that is, the lands of the donataries). Most donatary titles were hereditary, with a few exceptions mentioned in the Salic laws (Portuguese: leis Sálicas) of the time, which regulated all aspects of life, including crime, taxation, indemnity, and female inheritance; captains-major were less restricted to these conditions.

Many of these captains were selected as part of a consolidation of relationships between the donataries and their vassals. This subjective process usually involved close associations with the royal family or confidants of the Crown: a feudal meritocracy of vassals. This could result from rendering service during the overseas expansion, or from some heroism deemed as worthy of entitlement. The monarch surrounded himself with men seen as trustworthy, those who were already socially close to him, forming a restricted circle of individuals. In some cases, precedents were superseded in favor of persons in whom they could trust, including setting aside the laws of male inheritance in favor of a heiress, for example—as in the case of Antonia, Jácome de Bruges's daughter. Yet, most had to prove themselves, and those who did not succeed in proving their worth could lose their rights, as happened to Álvaro de Ornelas, captain of Pico, who lost his captaincy due to the perceived inefficiency of its settlement.

The captaincy system was built on confidence and good faith between the captain and the donatário, owing to the distance between them. This weakened the donatary's control over the officials, resulting in a disparity between actual and perceived functions. Some were either incompetent in their roles, power-hungry, or just absent. In some cases, the inhabitants of certain possessions were often subject to irregularities resulting from judicial or fiscal issues. Some captains appointed overseers, called ouvidores (lit. 'hearers', or auditors) to represent those who were unqualified to respond to the issues of their masters.

== Captaincies ==
The following is an incomplete list of some of the captaincies and their first donatary captains.

=== Madeira ===
Medieval map showing the Atlantic frontier and settlements along the sea. (Petrus Roselli — Bibliothèque Nationale de France)

There were three captaincies in the archipelago of Madeira, associated with the three principal discoverers of the islands:

- Funchal, bestowed to captain João Gonçalves Zarco;
- Machico, bestowed to captain Tristão Vaz Teixeira;
- Porto Santo, assigned to captain Bartolomeu Perestrello.

=== Azores ===
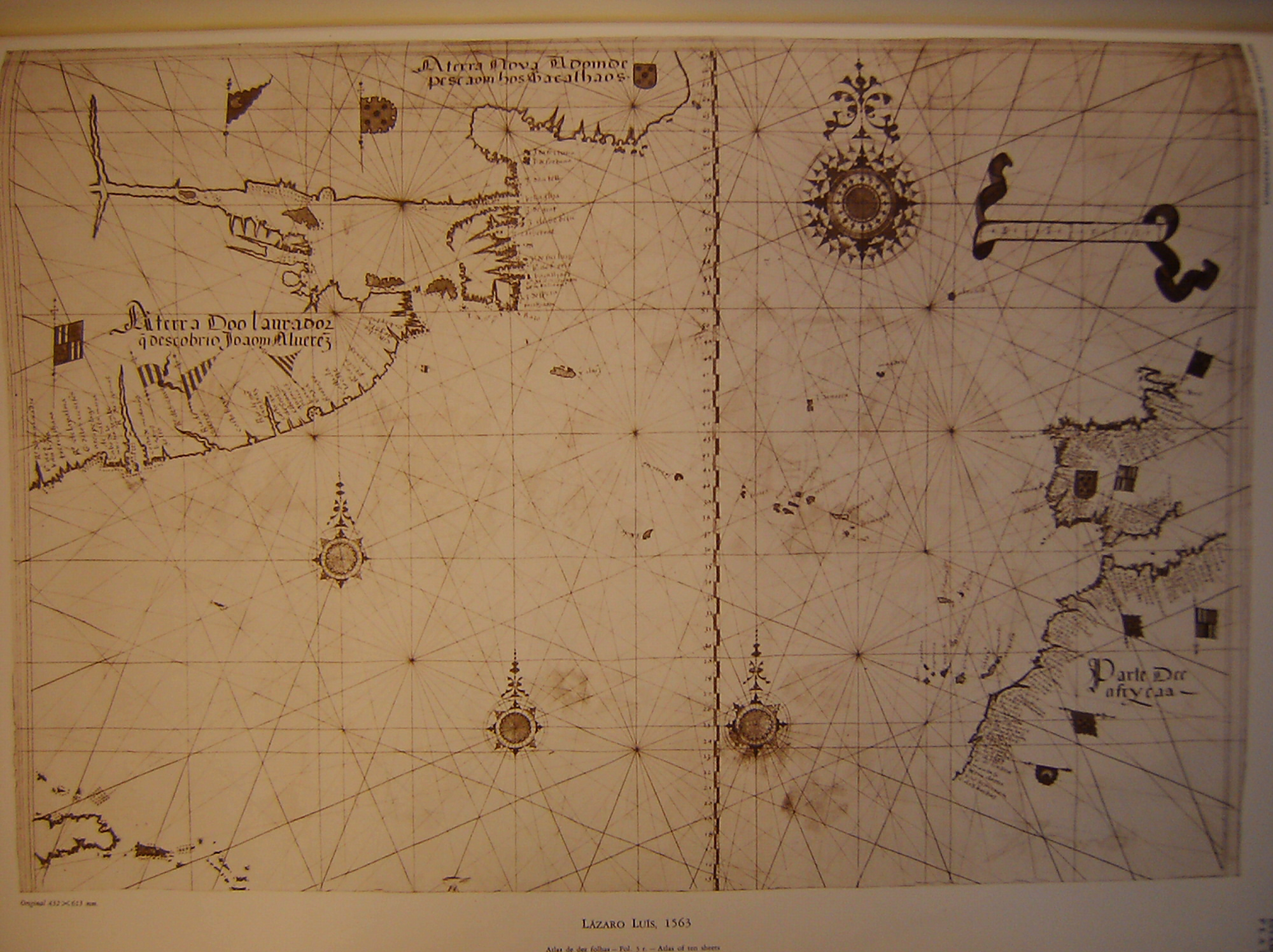
The Lazaro Luís map of the Atlantic (1563) showing the Azores and Madeira

Following their discovery, Gonçalo Velho Cabral became the first donatary captain of the islands, beginning with the island of Santa Maria, but later including the island of São Miguel when it was discovered. Those captaincies, which lasted from 1439 to 1461, as well as their first captain, were first mentioned in 1460 by Henry the Navigator in a letter to Cabral: "meu cavaleiro e capitão, por mim, em minhas ilhas de Santa Maria e São Miguel nos Açores" ("[You are ]my knight and captain, [ruling ]for me, in my islands of Saint Mary and Saint Michael in the Azores"). The progressive discovery of the islands of the archipelago resulted in new captaincies; in total, there have been thirteen unique captaincies in the Azores since their discovery:

- Santa Maria: part of Santa Maria and São Miguel, the captaincy of Gonçalo Velho Cabral; it was later split by his nephew João Soares de Albergaria, with Santa Maria left in the hands of Cabral's offspring;
- São Miguel: part of the captaincy of Gonçalo Velho Cabral; it was sold by João Soares de Albergaria to its third donatary captain Rui Gonçalves da Câmara;
- Angra: originally a single administration under the captaincy of Jácome de Bruges, the southern portion of Terceira was carved out and allocated to João Vaz Corte-Real;
- Praia: a quarrelling between João Vaz Corte-Real and Álvaro Martins Homem, after the mysterious "disappearance" of Jácome de Bruge, resulted in Álvaro's receiving Praia as his captaincy;
- Praia da Graciosa: initially allocated to Duarte Barreto do Couto at the time of its early settlement, his mysterious disappearance left it in the caretakership of his wife, until her brother Vasco Gil Sodré came to assist her with keeping the settlement for her family;
- Santa Cruz: Pedro Correio da Cunha (brother-in-law of Christopher Columbus), who arrived on the island from Porto Santo, obtained the captaincy in 1474, after Duarte Barreto do Couto went missing;
- Graciosa: Vasco Gil Sodré attempted to obtain the captaincy of Graciosa following a Castilian incursion in 1475, but, using the same logic, the Crown decided to unify the island under one captain: Pedro Correio do Couto;
- São Jorge: originally bestowed to João Vaz Corte-Real, the island was a fiefdom of Terceira, until re-incorporated by the Crown, after Manuel de Moura Corte-Real, donatary captain of Angra, decided to maintain his allegiance to Philip III of Portugal;
- Faial: the island was placed under the administration of Josse van Huerter, even after he failed on his first attempt to settle the island. This would be a discrepancy, since his second attempt at settling and developing the territory resulted in greater expansion;
- Pico: Álvaro de Ornelas attempted to settle the island, starting from 1460, bringing colonists from northern Portugal who arrived via Terceira and Graciosa, but his attempt was slow and ultimately failed;
- Faial and Pico: the island of Pico was incorporated into the Faialan administration of the Huerter–Dutra family on 29th December 1482, following the inefficiency and failure of Álvaro de Ornelas to spearhead and expand settlements;
- Flores and Corvo: developed belatedly and without any clear statute, the two-island fiefdom functioned within a feudal hierarchy, following its settlement by Diogo de Teive.

=== Africa ===
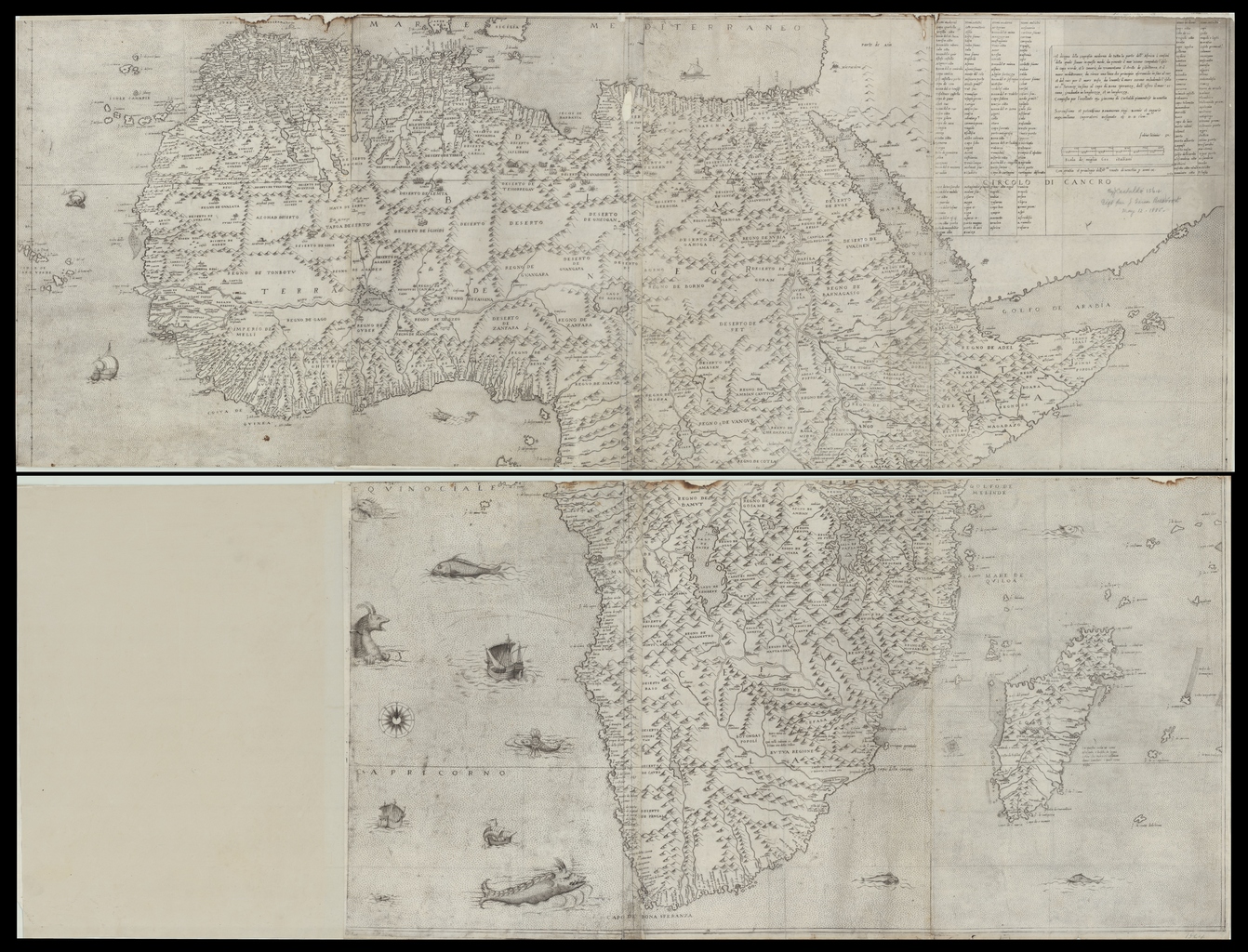
A map of Africa by the Italian cartographer, engineer, and astronomer Giacomo Gastaldi (c. 1500–1566)

- Portuguese Guinea, before it was united in 1879 under that name with its own governor, and separated from Portuguese Cape Verde, remaining Portuguese till 1974:
  - Bissau, 1687–1879; see Colonial Heads of Bissau
  - Cacheu (after Administrators since 1614) c. 1640–1879; see also Colonial Heads of Cacheu
- in present-day Ghana, since the foundation of the Portuguese Gold Coast on the 21st of January, 1482, it had always had a single captain-major, until after the Dutch occupation of its capital São Jorge da Mina on the 29th of August, 1637; it was ceded to the Dutch, becoming part of Dutch Gold Coast, on the 9th of January, 1642;
- Mazagan (El Jadida), from 1506, when it became a Portuguese possession, to 1608; thereafter, it had its own governors, being ultimately incorporated into the Sultanate of Morocco on 11 March 1769;
- Mombasa, on the coast of later Kenya (since 1502 a sultanate, Mvita in Swahili or Manbasa [منبعثة] in Arabic, independent from Kilwa Kisiwani) since its 1593 Portuguese occupation had captains-major (since 1638 as a Portuguese colony, subordinated to Goa in India), interrupted on the 12 December 1698 by Omani sovereignty (under governors styled Wali [والي] in Arabic, or Liwali in Swahili, meaning "Governor" in both languages), then a last one as Portuguese rule resumed (12 March 1728 – 21 September 1729, with Álvaro Caetano de Melo Castro, ending up definitively lost — see also Colonial Heads of Mombasa;
- Portuguese Mozambique, claimed for Portugal by Vasco da Gama on the 1st of March 1498; had captains-major starting from 1501, when a Portuguese administration began, as Captaincy of Sofala (subordinated to Goa, in India), till 1569; thereafter ruled by captains-general; then by governors, from 1609; and, from March 1837, by governors-general. See Colonial Heads of Mozambique;
- on the São Tomé island, there had been captains-major from 1485, when it became a donataria (donatary's lands), to 1586, with governors assuming control after that. In 1753, it was united with the Príncipe Island, resulting in Portuguese São Tomé and Príncipe.

=== South America ===
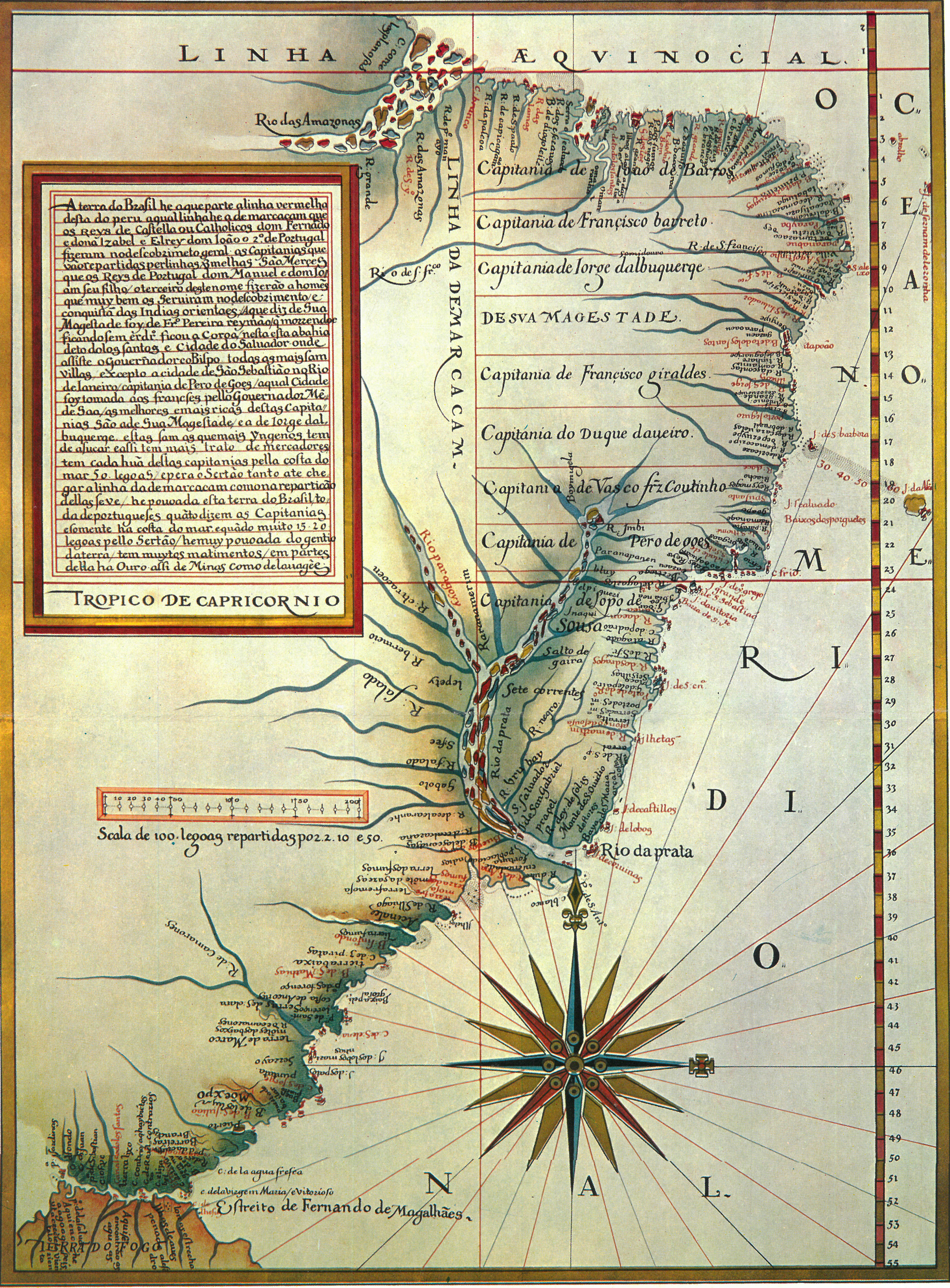
The captaincies of Brazil (Luís Teixeira), Biblioteca da Ajuda (Lisbon)

- Ceará, a captaincy since 1619, subordinated to the Captaincy of Maranhão from 1621 to 1656; there were captains-major from 30 June 1699 to 17 January 1799. Ceará was then split from the Captaincy of Pernambuco (to which it had been subordinated since 1656) and received its own governor;
- Espírito Santo, which had been a donataria under its own governors since 1535, had captains-major 1627–1675, then again two donatary governors, and more captains-major 1682 through 1799 (though since 1718 it was a crown colony, subordinated to Bahia), and finally governors again after that;
- The State of Grão-Pará and Maranhão had captains-major starting in 1615—when the settlement began as a part of Maranhão, which had its governors residing there from 1737 to 1755). After 1753, it had only governors-general;
- Captaincy of Maranhão had captains-major from 1745 to 1775, and governors after 1775 (and also before 1745, starting on 9 January 1616);
- Captaincy of Paraíba, since its creation in 1582, subordinated to Pernambuco, except during the Dutch occupation (1635–1645) and the single junta (1645–1655), through 1797, with governors taking over after that. In 1799, a separate Captaincy of Paraíba do Norte was created;
- at least one captain-major is known to have ruled the Captaincy of Pernambuco (founded in 1535 as Donataria of Nova Lusitania; renamed in 1575): Manuel de Mascarenhas Homem; no later than 1699, it received its own governors, but, nevertheless, became a Crown colony in 1716;
- the Captaincy of Rio Grande, founded in 1597, had a single captain-major from 1697 to 1701, Bernardo Vieira de Mello, then governors; subordinated to Pernambuco till 1808; it then received its current name, Rio Grande do Norte, in 1737, retaining it ever since;
- at least from 1761 in the 1759-founded Captaincy of São José do Piauí, subordinated to Maranhão till 1811, from then with its own governors, since 28 February 1821 renamed to Province of Piauí;
- Captaincy of São Vicente had captains-major, alongside donataries, from 1533 to 1691. On 17 April 1709, the name of São Vicente changed to São Paulo e Minas de Ouro. From 18 June 1710, it gained its own governors. In 1750 it was renamed to São Paulo. It became a province on 28 February 1821;
- Sergipe d'el Rei had captains-major since 1696, and also after the 1763 merger with Bahia, till 20 February 1821; thereafter it was a province with its own governors.

=== Asia ===
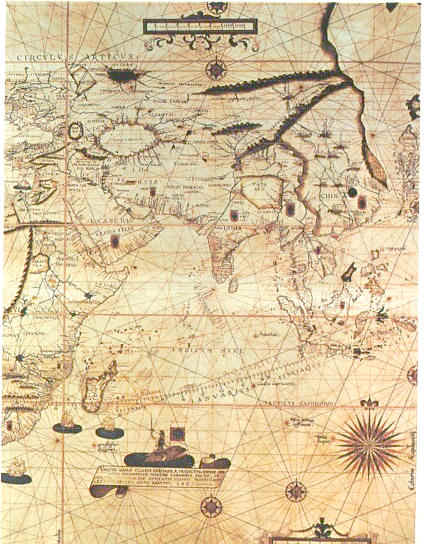
A historic map from the Age of Exploration, showing Southeast Asia

- starting from 1518 (except 1524 and 1551), Portuguese captains-major were appointed to Colombo, the capital of the Kotte kingdom on Portuguese Ceylon (currently Sri Lanka), until the last incumbent, Pedro Homem Pereira, was promoted to governor in 1594. On 27 May 1597, King Dharmapala of Kotte dies heirless, and bequeaths his entire kingdom to the King of Portugal, turning it into a Portuguese colony;
- in 1557, the Portuguese established a trading post in Macau (subordinated to Goa in Portuguese India). It had captains-major thence to 1622, then governors from 7 July 1623 to 19 December 1999, when its lands were returned to China;
- Portuguese Timor, becoming a colony in 1642, had donataries at least since 1647, then captains-major 1665–1702, then governors;
- Ormus (present-day Hormuz in Iran) had captains-major from September 1507 to January 1508, when the Portuguese first occupied it, then again in 1 April 1515 when the island became a Portuguese possession (subordinated to Goa in Portuguese India), until its incorporation into Persia on 3 May 1622;
- Portuguese Malacca, a Portuguese colony on peninsular Malaysia, starting on 24 August 1511, had captains-major from 1512 (also subordinated to Goa) to 14 January 1641, then it had captains-general till the Dutch assumed control of it on 14 January 1641.

== Captains ==
=== Colonial captaincies in Africa ===
- in Portuguese Cape Verde, there had been various captaincies. Only in 1587 the donatarias were united into colony under one governor:
  - Captains of Santiago (later Northern Santiago), 1462–1505;
  - Captains of Ribeira Grande (southern Santiago), from 19 September 1462 to sometime after 22 December 1562;
  - Captains of Boa Vista, 1497–1542;
  - Captains of Alcatrazes, 1484–1508;
  - Captains of Praia, 1526–1570;
  - Captains of Fogo, 1528–1553;
  - Captains of Santo Antão, from 1548 to some year before the end of that century.
- in Morocco:
  - Aguz (Souira Guedima), during the entire Portuguese rule there, which lasted from 1506 to 1525;
  - Arzila (or Asilah), from the 24th of August, 1471, when Portuguese rule began, to 1545, thereafter having own governors (except from August 1550–1577, when it was temporarily restored to Moroccan rule) until 1589 when it was returned to Morocco definitively;
  - Azamor (Azemmour), from becoming a colony on 3 September 1513 to being restored to Moroccan domain on 30 October 1541;
  - in Safim (Safi), during the entire Portuguese rule there from 1488 to 1541.

=== Colonial captaincies in America ===
- A special case was the Chief of the Captaincy of the Pro-French Republic of Counani, Trajano Benitez, from 23 July 1886; there were four presidential terms after that.

== See also ==
- Captaincies of the Portuguese Empire
- Captain-General
