= Freixo de Espada à Cinta =

- Municipality
- Town of Freixo de Espada à Cinta
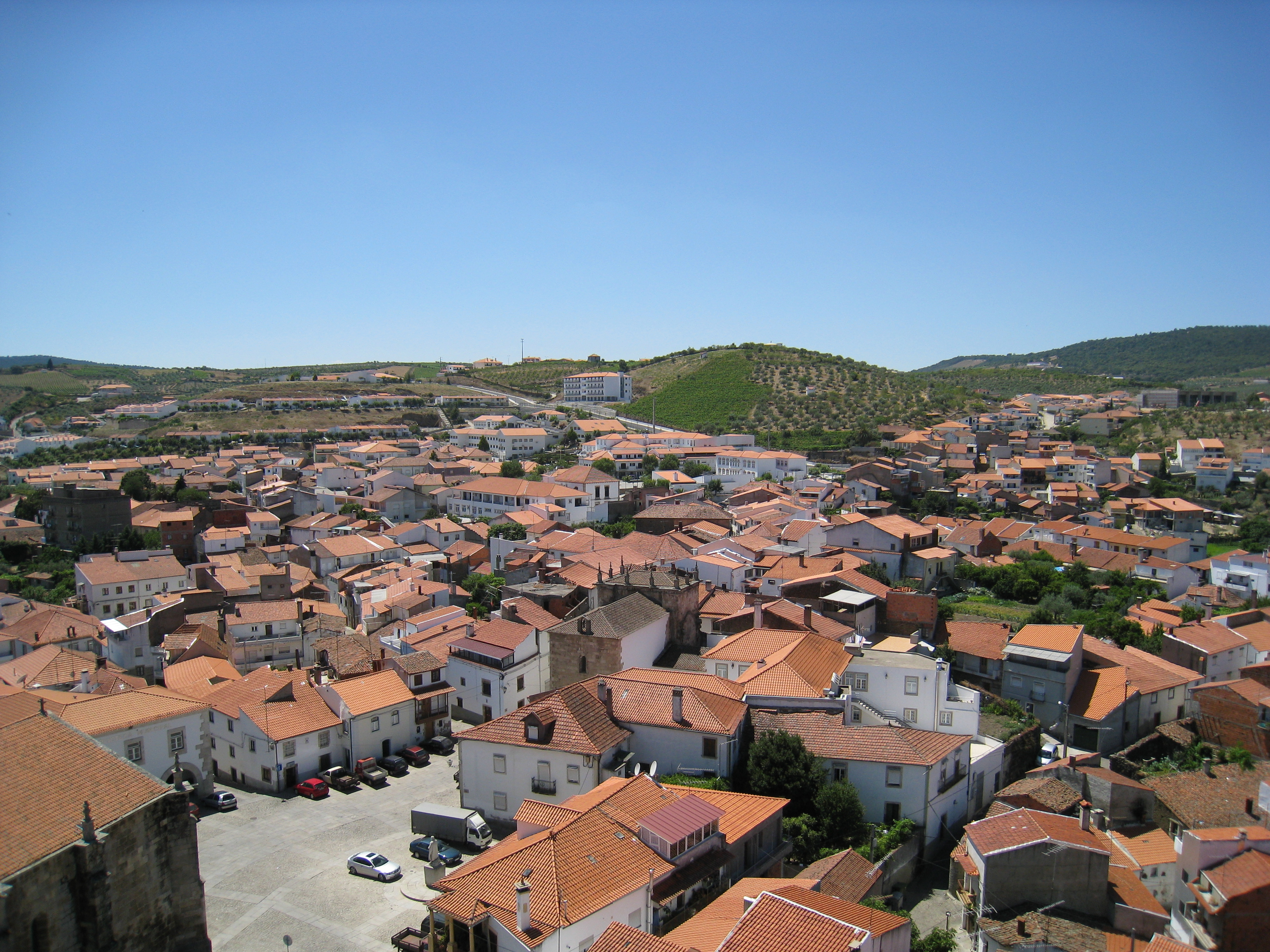
- View of Freixo de Espada à Cinta

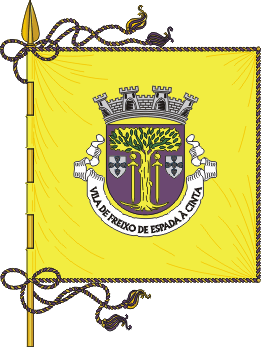
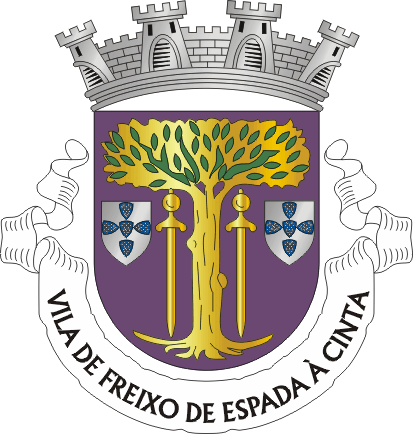
- Flag Coat of arms
- Interactive map of Freixo de Espada à Cinta
- Location in Portugal
- Coordinates: 41°5′28″N 6°48′28″W
- Country: Portugal
- Region: Norte
- Intermunic. comm.: Douro
- District: Bragança
- Parishes: 4

Government
  - President: José Manuel Caldeira Santos (PS)

Area
  - Total: 244.14 km^{2} (94.26 sq mi)

Population (2011)
  - Total: 2,188
  - Density: 8.962/km^{2} (23.21/sq mi)
- Time zone: UTC+00:00 (WET)
  - Summer (DST): UTC+01:00 (WEST)
- Postal code: 5180
- Area code: 279
- Website: www.cm-freixoespadacinta.pt

Freixo de Espada à Cinta (European Portuguese pronunciation: [ˈfɾɐjʃu ðɨ (i)ʃˈpaðɐ a ˈsĩtɐ]), sometimes erroneously called Freixo de Espada Cinta (an archaism), and officially Town of Freixo de Espada à Cinta (Portuguese: Vila Freixo de Espada à Cinta), is a municipality in the northeastern region of Portugal, near the border with Spain, along the Douro River Valley. A small portion of the municipality lies in the Tierra de Miranda. The population in 2011 was 3,780, in an area of 244.14 km^{2}.

== History ==
There have been historians that affirm that the Narbasi, a proto-Roman Iberian clan mentioned by Ptolemy, first gathered in this region.

=== Medieval ===
There are various versions and legends associated with the municipality's toponymy. Of all the examples, there are common deductions: a Espada na Cinta de um Freixo (which literally means sword on the belt of an ash). There is no doubt that freixo in this context refers to the ash tree, a Portuguese derivative of the Latin fraxinus, although the rest of the toponymic name is still confounded in legend. One legend recalls that the settlement of Freixo was established by a nobleman named Feijão, who died in 977, cousin of Saint Rudesind, whose heraldry included both an ash tree and belted-sword, to which the community received its name. Another legend suggests that the name was derived from a nobleman named Espadacinta; after a battle with Arabs along the margins of the Douro River, he arrived in this territory, and tired, he rested in the shadow of a large ash tree, where he hung his sword. This perpetuated the name for the settlement, which soon became known as Freixo de Espadacinta. A similar story recounts that it was King Denis who, fatigued from his battles with his illegitimate son (Afonso Sanches), and travelling through the wilderness of Freixo, he rested under the shadow of the ash tree, where he impaled his broadsword. The King fell asleep, and after a dream, declared that the village would be known as Freixo de Espada à Cinta. Today, near the Matriz Church, which once pertained to the medieval castle, exists an old ash tree, which is accepted by the local residents as the fabled tree impaled by the King.

It was in this region that Afonso II sustained attacks by Alfonso IX of León who protected his sisters. The land was taken and sacked in 1211 by Leonese forces. Much later, in 1236, during the reign of Sancho II Freixe was encircled by the Castilian Infante Afonso, the son of Ferdinand, but the citizens were able to defend the Castilian embargo and drive their forces into retreat. In recompense, the Portuguese monarch conceded the category of vila (town) in 1240.

Shortly after, on 27 March 1248, King Afonso conferred a foral (charter) on this region, and renewing the diploma on 20 January 1273. The medieval privileges of the foral also permitted the town to be represented in the Cortes.

The municipality of Freixo, hoping that a medieval fair could help the merchant community and increase the number of local residents (to defend the territory), made a petition to King Denis, which the monarch conferred on the city on 9 March 1307 (to be held monthly for a day).

Continuing their rise, the burgh petitioned King Afonso IV to conclude the walling of the town, which also allowed the construction of the Matriz Church completed during the regin of King John IV.

Afonso V maintained many of the infrastructures within the village of Freixo de Espada à Cinta, but donated all the other royal rights to Vasco Fernandes Sampaio, the regions first donatorio, which remained within the hereditary titles of the family for the many centuries (until 19 July 1790 law that abolished the donatorio system).

King Manuel authorized a new foral for Freixo on 1 October 1512.

The village would continue to suffer for many years during the Frontier Wars, namely between 1580 and 1640, as pillaging and destruction of settlements along the border continued between Castile and Portugal. The sacking of Lagoaça and Fornos in 1644 were examples of these events.

On 10 September 1673, brothers of the Order of the Oratory arrived in Freixo, and began to build the Convent of São Filipe Nery, which was the second to be built in Portugal to the invocation of Saint Philip Neri.

=== Monarchy ===
Owing to a decline in local agriculture the Juíz de Fora instituted awards to motive the local economy (1786), promoting the three pillars of the economy: olive and cherry orchards and silk production. This would become important as, by 1792, the Douro becomes a navigable waterway, and products could be easily transported by the waterway.

During the Liberal turmoils of the 19th century, the settlements in Lagoaça, Fornos and Mazouco are visited daily by rebel forces that escaped into Spain, during the latter-part of King John IV reign. But by 1832, Freixo was squarely on the side of Miguelist forces, who supported Miguel.

Between 1854 and 1855, the region is infected by a cholera outbreak that especially affected the ecclesiastical parish of Lagoaça. Lagoaça would become a civil parish in 1867, that included the religious parishes of Fornos, Carviçais, Estevais (de Mogadouro), Castelo Branco, Vilarinho dos Galegos and Bruçó.

In the same year, the District Junta Geral of Bragança established a contract with local farmer Manuel Guerra Tenreiro to provide 180,000 feet of mulberry trees to be distributed to many of the municipalities of the District.

During the Janeirinha (1868) the municipal council hall, which then dated back to the medieval epoch was assaulted and burned down.

In 1896 the municipality of Freixo de Espada à Cinta is abolished and its lands appended to the municipality of Torre de Moncorvo. It residents persisted and were able to reposition the region in order to re-establish the municipality on 13 January 1898 (issuance of a municipal foral).

=== Republic ===
A local syndicate was established in 1902 (lasting until 1905) to support local agriculture (Portuguese: Sindicato Agrícola de Freixo de Espada-à-Cinta).

On 17 September 1911 the first raillink is inaugurated between Pocinho and Carviçais, but it would be more than 16 years before the communities of Carviçais and Lagoaça would be connected.

The Bishop of Bragança prohibited the typical loas to Santo António which were a mix of oratory and religious satire.

== Geography ==
=== Physical geography ===
Freixo de Espada à Cinta is part of the Trás-os-Montes e Alto Douro in the district of Bragança, located 180 kilometres northeast of the city of Porto, 400 kilometres northeast of Lisbon and 100 kilometres south of the district seat. It is bordered on the north by the municipality of Mogadouro, to the west by Torre de Moncorvo, east by the province of Salamanca in Spain, and south by the municipality of Figueira de Castelo Rodrigo.

==== Ecoregions/Protected area ====
Located a few minutes from the urban centre, the Praia Fluvial de Congida is a recreational space, with re-qualified leisure spaces, including bar, suspended esplanade, pool and playground. The tourist complex is also the centre for annual trips along the Douro River, organized by the Sociedade Transfronteiriça Congida-La Barca and supported by the municipal council of Freixo de Espada à Cinta and Ayuntamento de Vilvestre. Within this landscape are several houses, which are part of the Douro International (Portuguese: Moradias do Douro Internacional), which includes ten rustic one-room bungalows, with pool.

Sport fishing is also popular in this area, which is encountered in the shadow of the Saucelle Dam/Reservoir, and is stocked with minnows, barbel, barb and carp.

=== Human geography ===
Administratively, the municipality is divided into 4 civil parishes (freguesias):

- Freixo de Espada à Cinta e Mazouco
- Lagoaça e Fornos
- Ligares
- Poiares

== Economy ==
=== Transport ===
Freixo is crossed by the national E.N.221 (Guarda-Pinhel-Figueira de Castelo Rodrigo-Freixo de Espada à Cinta-Miranda do Douro) accessway, which is five kilometres from Saucelle, an important link to the province of Salamanca in Spain. Departing in the morning and ending their circuit at the end of the day (night), the municipality of Freixo has inter-community bus connections to many of the major cities in the region, including Porto, Lisbon, Bragança, Vila Real and Coimbra.

The nearest railway station is now at Pocinho, the terminus of the railway to Porto via the Douro Valley. The community was formerly served by the Freixo de Espada à Cinta railway station on the Sabor line, a narrow gauge railway which closed in 1988.

== Notable citizens ==
- Jorge Álvares (before 1500 – 1521), captain under Afonso de Albuquerque, first Portuguese navigator to participate in an expedition from Malacca to Canton, where he ported in Tamau, a neighbouring island of Sanchoão (1514), where he raised a marker to establish Portuguese possession of the territory; he was also known for providing the oldest information to the Portuguese Cortes about Japan, which he entrusted to his friend Francis Xavier (1547) on his return to Europe.
- António José Antunes Navarro, 1st Count of Lagoaça (1803–1867) a Portuguese nobleman and politician.
- Abilio Manuel Guerra Junqueiro (1850 – 1923), poet, writer, politician, antiquarian, collector and Ministerial Attaché to the Portuguese government in Switzerland, more recognized for his published works that were translated into Spanish, English, French and Italian. His state funeral was followed by his interment in the National Pantheon.
- Manuel Quintão Meireles (1880 – 1962), admiral during the southern Angolan campaigns of the Colonial War, he was Minister of Foreign Relations (Portuguese: Ministro dos Negócios Estrangeiros) and presidential candidate during the 1951 national elections in opposition to Craveiro Lopes.
- Manuel Maria Sarmento Rodrigues (c.1899 – c.1979), admiral; captain of the torpedo boat NRP Liz; of the gunboats NRP Faro and NRP Tete; of destroyer NRP Lima; commanding officer of the Naval Air Forces; captain of the aviso NRP Bartolomeu Dias; Commandant of the Naval School; Commander of Naval Forces in Mozambique; President of the Marine Academy; Governor of Portuguese Guinea and of Mozambique; and Minister of the Overseas.
