= List of captains-major of Bissau =

== List of colonial heads of Bissau ==
The territory is located in Guinea-Bissau.

Early incumbents, all styled Captain-major:

- 15 March 1692 – 15 March 1694 José Pinheiro da Câmara
- 1694–1696 Santao Vidigal Castanho
- 1696–1699 José Pinheiro da Câmara
- 1699–1707 Rodrigo Oliveira da Fonseca
- 1707–1753 abandoned
- 1753–17.. Nicolau Pino de Araújo
- 17..–c.1757 ....
- c.1757–1759 Manuel Pires
- 1759–17.. Duarte José Róis
- 17..–c.1763 ....
- c.1763–17.. Filipe José de Souto-Maior
- c.1770–c.1775 Sebastião da Cunha Souto-Maior
- c.1775–c.1777 ....
- c.1777–17.. Ignácio Xavier Baião
- 1793–c.1796 José António Pinto
- c.1796–1799 ....

Tenure	Incumbent	Notes
Portuguese Suzerainty
1799–180?	João das Neves Leão, Captain-Major
1803–180?	António Cardoso Faria, Captain-Major
1805–1811	Manuel Pinto de Gouveia, Captain-Major
1811–18??	António Cardoso Figueiredo, Captain-Major
c.1820–c.1821	João Higino Curvo Semedo, Captain-Major
1822–182?	Joaquim António de Matos, Captain-Major	1st Term
182?–1825	Domingos Alves de Abreu Picaluga, Captain-Major
1825–1827	Joaquim António de Matos, Captain-Major	2nd Term
1827–18??	Fancisco José Muacho, Captain-Major
c.1829–1830	Caetano José Nozolini, Captain-Major	1st Term
1830–183?	Joaquim António de Matos, Captain-Major	3rd Term
183?–1834	Caetano José Nozolini, Captain-Major	2nd Term
1834–183?	Joaquim António de Matos, Captain-Major	4th Term
1836–1836	José Eleutério Rocha Vieira, Captain-Major
1836–1839	Honório Barreto, Captain-Major	1st Term
1839–1840	José Gonçalves Barbosa, Captain-Major	1st Term
1840–1841	Honório Barreto, Captain-Major	2nd Term
1841–1842	José Paulo Machado, Captain-Major
1842–1843	António Tavares da Veiga Santos, Captain-Major
1843–1844	José Maria Coelho, Captain-Major
1844–1845	Alois da Rôla Dziezaski, Captain-Major	1st Term
1845–1847	Joaquim de Azevedo Alpoim, Captain-Major
1847–1848	Carlos Maximiliano de Sousa, Captain-Major
1848–1850	Caetano José Nozolini, Captain-Major	3rd Term
1851–185?	Alois da Rôla Dziezaski, Captain-Major	2nd Term
1852–1852	Libánio Evangelista dos Santos, Captain-Major
1852–1853	José Maria Lôbo de Ávila, Captain-Major
1853–1854	José Maria Correia da Silva, Captain-Major
1854–1854	Pedro Henriques Romão Ferreira, Captain-Major
1855–1858	Honório Barreto, Captain-Major	3rd Term
1858–1858	António Pereira Mouzinho de Albuquerque Cota Falcão, Captain-Major
1858–1859	Honório Barreto, Captain-Major	4th Term
1860–1862	António Cândido Zagalo, Captain-Major
1863–186?	Joaquim Alberto Marquês, Captain-Major	1st Term
1867–1868	Bernardo José Moreira, Captain-Major
1868–1869	Manuel Fortunato Meira, Captain-Major
1869–1871	Álvaro Teles Caldeira, Captain-Major
1871–1871	José Xavier do Crato, Captain-Major
1871–187?	Joaquim Alberto Marquês, Captain-Major	2nd Term
c.1877–1879	António José Cabral Vieira, Captain-Major

== See also ==
- Guinea-Bissau
  - Heads of State of Guinea-Bissau
  - Heads of Government of Guinea-Bissau
  - Colonial Heads of Portuguese Guinea
  - Colonial Heads of Cacheu
- Lists of office-holders
- List of national leaders

== Sources and references ==
- WorldStatesmen–Guinea-Bissau
