= Guerra Junqueiro =

Portuguese civil servant

Abílio Manuel Guerra Junqueiro
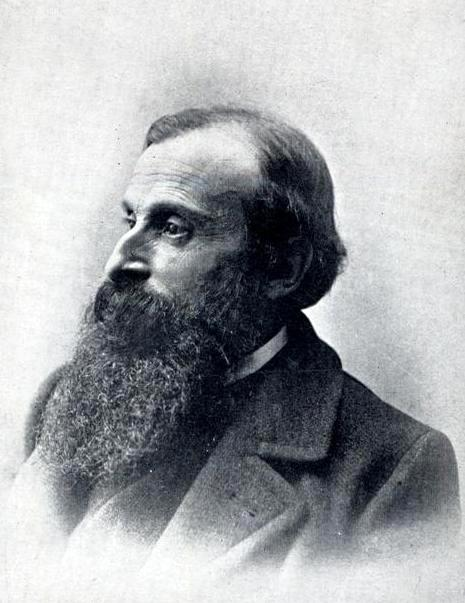
- Junqueiro circa 1900
- Born: 17 September 1850; Freixo de Espada à Cinta, Portugal
- Died: 7 July 1923 (aged 72); Lisbon, Portugal
- Occupations: Civil servant, politician, journalist, author and poet.

Abílio Manuel Guerra Junqueiro (Portuguese pronunciation: [ˈɡɛʁɐ ʒũˈkɐjɾu], 17 September 1850 – 7 July 1923) was a Portuguese top civil servant, member of the Portuguese House of Representatives, journalist, author, and poet. His work helped inspire the creation of the Portuguese First Republic. Junqueiro wrote highly satirical poems criticizing conservatism, romanticism, and the Church leading up to the Portuguese Revolution of 1910. He was one of Europe's greatest poets. Junqueiro studied law at the University of Coimbra.

== Life ==
Born in Freixo de Espada à Cinta, Trás-os-Montes, Portugal to José António Junqueiro Júnior, a supply trader and farmer, and wife Ana Maria Guerra. His mother died when he was only three years old.

He made secondary studies in Bragança and at sixteen, he enrolled at the University of Coimbra, to study theology. Two years later he left to study law, that he concluded in 1873. Then he became secretary of the governor of Angra do Heroísmo, Azores, and later of Viana do castelo. In 1878, he was elected to the House of Representatives.

In 1885 he published at Porto A velhice do Padre Eterno, that generated strong criticism from Portuguese Catholic Church. After the British Ultimatum and the political crisis associated, he was involved in the political debate in 1891, writing some best-sellers that had huge impact in public opinion, contributing to the discredit of the Portuguese monarchy and the success of the Portuguese Republican Party in the 1910 Portuguese Revolution. He translated into Portuguese short stories by Hans Christian Andersen.

He married Filomena Augusta da Silva Neves on 10 February 1880, the couple had two children; Maria Isabel Guerra Junqueiro on 11 November 1880, second wife without issue of Luís Augusto de Sales Pinto da Mesquita de Carvalho (1868–1931) and Júlia Guerra Junqueiro in 1881, unmarried and without issue. He died in Lisbon at the age of 72.

In 1940 Junqueiro's daughter donated his estate in Porto that became the Guerra Junqueiro Museum.

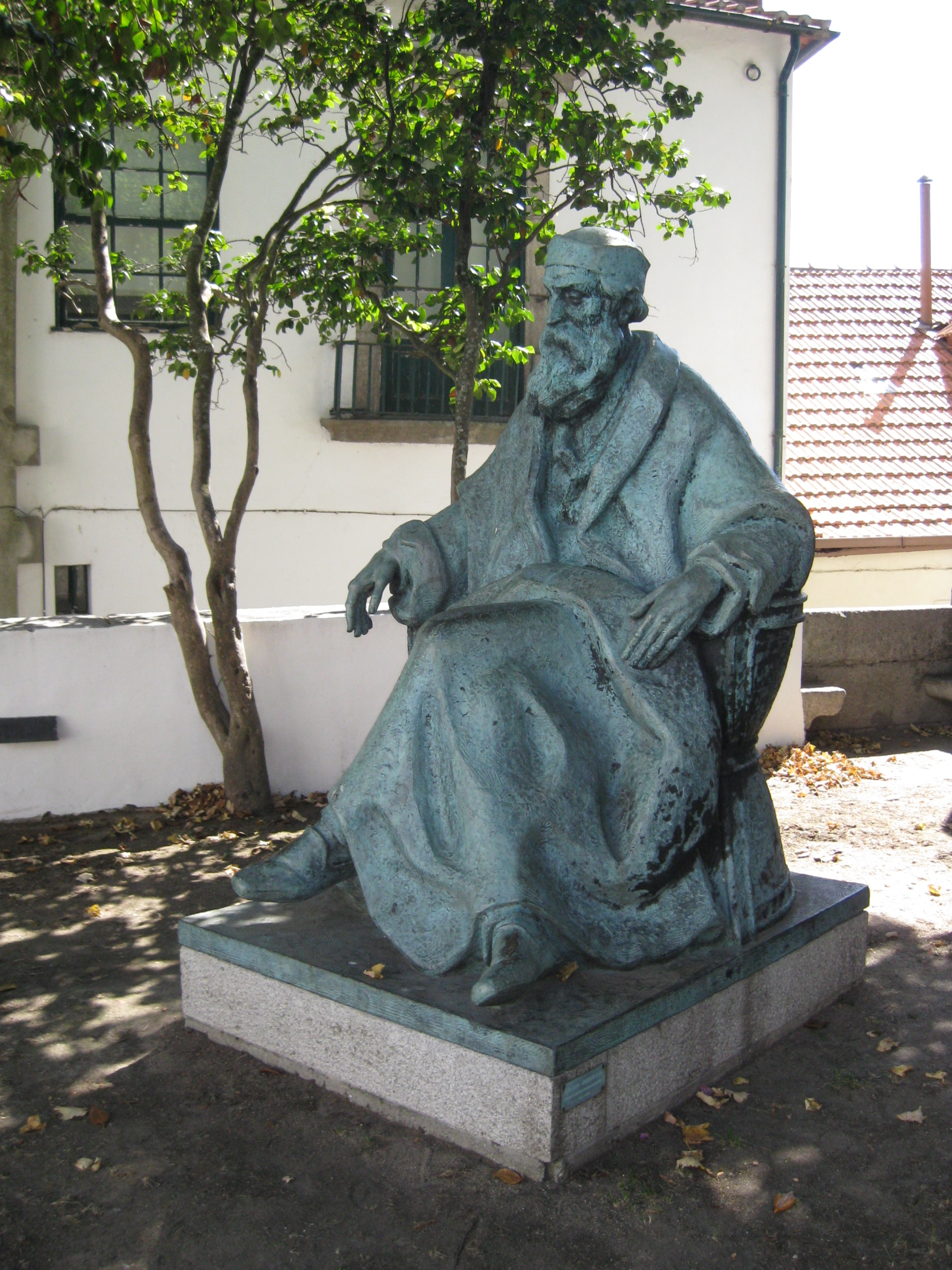
Bronze statue of Guerra Junqueiro (1850-1923) by Leopoldo de Almeida (1970) in the gardens of the Casa-Museu Guerra Junqueiro.

== Works ==
- Viagem À Roda Da Parvónia
- A Morte De D. João (1874)
- Contos para a infância (1875)
- A Musa Em Férias (1879)
- A velhice do Padre Eterno (1885)
- Finis Patriae (1890)
- Os Simples (1892)
- Oração Ao Pão (1903)
- Oração À Luz (1904)
- Gritos da Alma (1912)
- Pátria (1915)
- Poesias Dispersas (1920)
- Duas páginas dos quatorze anos
- O Melro

== See also ==
- Guerra Junqueiro's Museum
