= António José Antunes Navarro, 1st Count of Lagoaça =

Portuguese nobleman and politician

António Antunes Navarro
- Count of Lagoaça
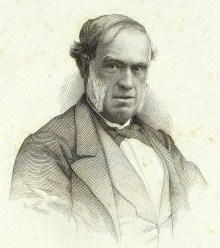

Count of Lagoaça
- Full name: António José Antunes Navarro
- Born: July 11, 1803; Lagoaça, Kingdom of Portugal
- Died: July 13, 1867 (aged 64); Vila Nova de Famalicão, Kingdom of Portugal
- Noble family: Antunes Navarro

António José Antunes Navarro, 1st Count of Lagoaça (11 July 1803 in Lagoaça – 13 July 1867 in Vila Nova de Famalicão) was a Portuguese nobleman and politician.

== Life ==
António José Antunes Navarro was born on 11 July 1803 in Lagoaça, Freixo de Espada à Cinta Municipality.

He served as President of the Municipal Chambers of Porto from 1858 to 1865.

After visiting Porto of King Pedro V of Portugal, he awarded the title of Viscount of Lagoaça to Antunes Navarro.

Later on, King Luís I de Portugal upgraded the title of Antunes Navarro to Count of Lagoaça by decree on 31 October 1866.

== Sources ==
- Nobreza de Portugal e Brasil - vol. 2 - pages 670 to 671
