= Academia de Marinha =

Marine Academy
- Academia de Marinha

Agency overview
- Formed: 1978; 48 years ago
- Preceding agencies: Grupo de Estudos de História Marítima (1969); Centro de Estudos de Marinha (1970)
- Type: Culture body
- Jurisdiction: Portugal
- Headquarters: Lisbon; 38°39′47.77″N 9°8′48.36″W
- Motto: Por mares nunca de outro lenho arados
- Minister responsible: Admiral António Mendes Calado, Chief of the Naval Staff and National Maritime Authority
- Agency executive: Admiral Francisco Vidal Abreu, President
- Parent department: Portuguese Navy
- Website: http://academia.marinha.pt/

The Academia de Marinha (Portuguese for "Navy Academy" or "Marine Academy"), MembIH is the cultural agency of the Portuguese Navy under the Chief of Naval Staff. Its purpose is to promote and to publish artistic, literary, historical, and scientific studies relating to the sea and maritime activities. Its offices are located in Lisbon at the Naval Headquarters, Rua do Arsenal.

== History ==
This agency of the Portuguese Navy developed from the Maritime History Studies group (Grupo de Estudos de História Marítima), established in 1969 by the vice-admirals Sarmento Rodrigues and Teixeira da Mota. In the following year, it was renamed the Center for Naval Studies (Centro de Estudos de Marinha). In December 1978, its role was widened into a broader cultural agency and renamed the Academia de Marinha (Portaria nº 769).

== Motto ==
The motto of the Academia de Marinha is a verse from Os Lusíadas:

Por mares nunca de outro lenho arados (Portuguese for: "On seas never plowed by other wood")

== Membership ==
Members of the Academy are admitted to one of four categories:

- Emeritus members
- Active members
- Corresponding members
- Associate members

The first three categories must be Portuguese citizens or citizens of Portuguese-speaking countries, while the last is reserved for foreign members.

Each category of membership is made up of two classes:

- Class of Maritime History
- Class of Arts, Letters, and Sciences
