= Diogo António José Leite Pereira de Melo e Alvim =

Portuguese colonial governor

Diogo António José Leite Pereira de Melo e Alvim was a former Portuguese colonial Governor of Portuguese Guinea (modern Guinea-Bissau) from 1954 to 1956.
