= List of governors of Portuguese Guinea =

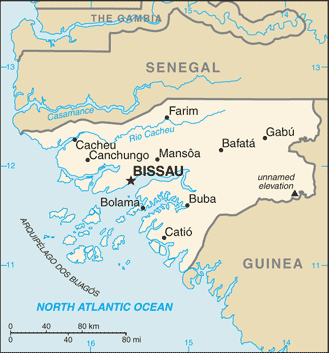
Map of Guinea-Bissau.

Coat of arms of Portuguese Guinea

This is a list of European colonial administrators responsible for the territory of Portuguese Guinea, an area equivalent to modern-day Guinea-Bissau. In 1941 the capital moved from Bolama to Bissau.

== List ==
(Dates in italics indicate de facto continuation of office)

Tenure	Portrait	Incumbent	Notes
Portuguese suzerainty
20 April 1879 to 16 December 1881		Agostinho Coelho, Governor	
16 December 1881 to 17 March 1885		Pedro Inácio de Gouveia, Governor	1st time
17 March 1885 to 24 September 1886		Francisco de Paula Gomes Barbosa, Governor	
24 September 1886 to November 1886		José Eduardo de Brito, Governor	
November 1886 to April 1887		Cesar Augusto Moura Cabral, acting Governor	1st time
5 April 1887 to 30 May 1888		Eusébio Castela do Valle, Governor	
30 May 1888 to 4 September 1888		Francisco Teixeira da Silva, Governor	
4 September 1888 to 22 February 1890		Joaquim da Graça Correia e Lança, Governor	
22 February 1890 to 26 June 1891		Augusto Rodrigues Gonçalves dos Santos, Governor	
26 June 1891 to 1895		Luís Augusto de Vasconcelos e Sá, Governor	
24 April 1893 to 23 October 1893		Cesar Gomes Barbosa, acting Governor	Acting for Sá
1895 to 4 April 1895		Cesar Augusto Moura Cabral, acting Governor	2nd time
4 April 1895 to 24 January 1896		Eduardo João da Costa Oliveira, Governor	
24 January 1896 to 25 August 1897		Pedro Inácio de Gouveia, Governor	2nd time
25 August 1897 to 22 December 1897		Cesar Augusto Moura Cabral, acting Governor	3rd time
22 December 1897 to 14 March 1900		Álvaro Herculano da Cunha, acting Governor	1st time
1898 to 17 January 1899		Albano Mendes de Magalhães Ramalho, acting Governor	Acting for Cunha
2 November 1899 to 7 February 1900		Fernando Augusto Liso de Santana, acting Governor	Acting for Cunha
14 March 1900 to 12 July 1900		Joaquim José Duarte Guimarães, acting Governor	
12 July 1900 to 20 May 1903		Joaquim Pedro Vieira Júdice Biker, Governor	
5 May 1901 to 1901		António Alves de Oliveira, acting Governor	Acting for Biker
1901		Joaquim Corte Real Pires, acting Governor	Acting for Biker
1901 to 6 December 1901		Amadeu Gonçalves Guimarães, acting Governor	Acting for Biker
20 May 1903 to 23 July 1903		José Mateus Lapa Valente, acting Governor	1st time
23 July 1903 to 9 August 1904		Alfredo Cardoso de Soveral Martins, Governor	
23 April 1904 to 1904		Joaquim Corte Real Pires, acting Governor	Acting for Martins
1904		António Marques Perdigão, acting Governor	Acting for Martins
9 August 1904 to 2 February 1905		José Mateus Lapa Valente, acting Governor	2nd time
2 February 1905 to 13 August 1906		Carlos de Almeida Pessanha, Governor	
June 1905 to 13 February 1906		José Mateus Lapa Valente, acting Governor	Acting for Pessanha
13 August 1906 to 29 June 1909		João Augusto de Oliveira Muzanty, Governor	
19 July 1907 to 18 November 1907		Joaquim Corte Real Pires, acting Governor	Acting for Muzanty
1908		Joaquim José Duarte Guimarães, acting Governor	Acting for Muzanty
29 June 1909 to 16 August 1910		Francelino Pimentel, Governor	
12 October 1909 to 1910		António Marques Perdigão, acting Governor	Acting for Pimentel
23 October 1910 to 16 August 1913		Carlos de Almeida Pereira, Governor	
17 March 1912 to 23 October 1912		Sebastião José Pereira, acting Governor	Acting for Pereira
16 August 1913 to 22 November 1913		Sebastião José Pereira, acting Governor	1st time
22 November 1913 to April 1914		José António de Andrade Sequeira, Governor	1st time
April 1914 to 7 May 1915		Sebastião José Pereira, acting Governor	2nd time
7 May 1915 to 24 August 1915		Josué de Oliveira Duque, Governor	1st time
24 August 1915 to 25 August 1915		Sebastião José Pereira, acting Governor	3rd time
25 August 1915 to June 1916		José António de Andrade Sequeira, Governor	2nd time
June 1916 to 10 January 1917		Sebastião José Pereira, acting Governor	4th time
10 January 1917 to 13 July 1917		Manuel Maria Coelho, Governor	
13 July 1917 to 9 August 1918		Carlos Ivo de Sá Ferreira, Governor	
9 August 1918 to 21 April 1919		Josué de Oliveira Duque, Governor	2nd time
21 April 1919 to 31 May 1919		José Luis Teixeira Marinho, Governor	
31 May 1919 to 16 June 1920		Henrique Alberto de Sousa Guerra, Governor	
16 June 1920 to 21 June 1921		Sebastião José Pereira, acting Governor	5th time
21 June 1921 to 20 December 1926		Jorge Frederico Vélez Caroço, Governor	
1 June 1923 to 5 April 1924		Alfredo Vieira, acting Governor	Acting for Caroço
20 December 1926 to 10 April 1927		António José Pereira Saldanha, acting Governor	
10 April 1927 to 17 April 1931		António Leite de Magalhães, Governor	
1 September 1928 to December 1928		José Manuel de Oliveira de Castro, acting Governor	Acting for Magalhães
October 1929 to December 1929		José Alves Ferreira, acting Governor	Acting for Magalhães
17 April 1931 to 8 May 1931		José Alves Ferreira, acting Governor	
8 May 1931 to 30 May 1932		João José Soares Zilhão, Governor	
30 May 1932 to 10 March 1933		José de Ascenção Valdez, acting Governor	
10 March 1933 to 1940		Luís António de Carvalho Viegas, Governor	
10 May 1933 to September 1933		José Peixoto Ponces de Carvalho, acting Governor	Acting for Viegas
August 1936 to 1936		José Salvação Barreto, acting Governor	Acting for Viegas
1938		Augusto Pereira Brandão, acting Governor	Acting for Viegas
1940 to 1941		Armando Augusto Gonçalves de Morais e Castro, acting Governor	
8 May 1941 to 1945		Ricardo Vaz Monteiro, Governor	
25 April 1945 to 20 January 1949		Manuel Maria Sarmento Rodrigues, Governor	
1948		Mario Ribeiro da Costa Zanatti, acting Governor	Acting for Rodrigues
1948 to 1949		Pedro Joaquim da Cunha e Meneses Pinto Cardoso, acting Governor	Acting for Rodrigues
21 June 1949 to 1953		Raimundo António Rodrigues Serrão, Governor	
1953 to 1954		Fernando Pimentel, Governor	
1954 to 1956		Diogo António José Leite Pereira de Melo e Alvim, Governor	
1956 to 1957		Álvaro Rodrigues da Silva Tavares, Governor	
1957 to 1958		Abel de Castro Roque, acting Governor	
1958 to 1962		António Augusto Peixoto Correia, Governor	Served at the time of the Pidjiguiti massacre
1962 to 1964		Vasco António Martins Rodrigues, Governor	
20 May 1964 to 1968		Arnaldo Schulz, Governor	
20 May 1968 to 6 August 1973		António Sebastião Ribeiro de Spínola, Governor	Following the Carnation Revolution, served as President of the National Salvation Junta and President of the Republic (April–September 1974)
21 September 1973 to 24 September 1973		José Manuel Bettencourt Rodrigues, Governor	
24 September 1973		Independence unilaterally declared in Madina do Boé (State of Guinea-Bissau)	
24 September 1973 to 26 April 1974		José Manuel Bettencourt Rodrigues, Governor	
27 April 1974 to 2 May 1974		António Eduardo Mateus da Silva, Governor	
2 May 1974 to 7 May 1974		São Gouveia, Governor	
7 May 1974 to 10 September 1974		Carlos Alberto Idães Soares Fabião, Government Delegate of the National Salvation Junta	
10 September 1974	Independence as State of Guinea-Bissau		

For continuation after independence, see: List of presidents of Guinea-Bissau

== See also ==
- Politics of Guinea-Bissau
- List of presidents of Guinea-Bissau
- List of prime ministers of Guinea-Bissau
- List of captains-major of Bissau
- List of captains-major of Cacheu
