= José Alves Ferreira =

Portuguese politician

José Alves Ferreira (born 1891) was a Portuguese politician, and interim governor of Portuguese India (Índia Portuguesa), in 1948. He was also a member of the court of appeals in Goa in 1948.
