= List of captains-major of Cacheu =

== List of colonial heads of Cacheu ==
The territory is located in Guinea-Bissau.

Tenure	Incumbent	Notes
Portuguese Suzerainty
July 1615 - April 1619	Baltasar Pereira de Castelo-Branco, Administrator	
April 1619 - July 1620	António de Proença, Administrator	
July 1620 - 1620	Francisco de Moura, Administrator	
1620 - September 1623	Francisco de Távora, Administrator	
c. 1625 - c. 1632	Francisco Sodré Pereira, Administrator	
163? - 1634	Francisco Nunes de Andrade, Administrator	
1634	Domingos Lobo Reimão, Administrator	
c. 1635 - 163?	Manuel Ferreira de Brito, Administrator	Functions ceased
163? - 1641	Luís de Magalhães, Captain-Major	
1641 - 1644	Gonçalo de Gamboa de Ayala, Captain-Major	1st Term, died in 1650
1644	Paulo Barradas da Silva, Captain-Major	in office, died in 1647
1644 - 1649	Gonçalo de Gamboa de Ayala, Captain-Major	2nd Term, died in 1650
1648 - 1649	Belchior Teixeira Cabral, Captain-Major	Captain Major under office by Gonçalo de Gamboa Ayala
1649 - 1650	Gaspar Vogado, Captain-Major	in office
1650	António Mendes Arnaut, Captain-Major	
1650 - 1654	João Carreiro Fidalgo, Captain-Major	
c. 1655	Manuel Paços de Figueiroa, Captain-Major	
1655 - 1657	Francisco Pereira da Cunha, Captain-Major	
1657 - 1662	Manuel Dias Cotrim, Captain-Major	
1662 - 1664	António da Fonseca de Ornelas, Captain-Major	
1664 - 1667?	João de Carvalho Moutinho, Captain-Major	
1667 - 1670?	Manuel de Almeida, Captain-Major	
1670? - 167?	Ambrósio Gomes, Captain-Major	in function (1621–1679)
c. 1671	Manuel Pacheco de Melo, Captain-Major	
c. 1671 - c. 1673	Manuel Moniz de Mendonça, Captain-Major	
c. 1674 - 1676	Sebastião Vidigal da Rosa, Captain-Major	
1676 - 1682	António de Barros Bezerra, Captain-Major	1st Term
1682 - 1685	Gaspar da Fonseca Pacheco, Captain-Major	
1685 - 1686	João Gonçalves de Oliveira, Captain-Major	
1686 - 1688	António de Barros Bezerra, Captain-Major	2nd Term
1688 - 1689	Rodrigo de Oliveira da Fonseca, Captain-Major	
1689 - 1690	José Pinheiro da Câmara, Captain-Major	1st Term
1690 - 1691	Domingos Monteiro de Carvalho, Captain-Major	died in office
1691 - 7 January 1692	Santos Vidigal Castanho, Captain-Major	1st Term, died in 1707
7 January 1692 – 15 March 1694	José Pinheiro da Câmara, Captain-Major	2nd Term
1694 - 1706	Santos Vidigal Castanho, Captain-Major	2nd Term, died in 1707
1706 - Junho de 1708	Paulo Gomes de Abreu e Lima, Captain-Major	(1664 - 17??)
1708 - 1715	..., Captain-Major	
1715 - 1719	António de Barros Bezerra, Jr., Captain-Major	1st Term, died in 1737
1719 - 17??	Inácio Lopes Ferreira, Captain-Major	
17?? - c. 1721	Manuel Lopes Lobo, Captain-Major	1st Term
c. 1721 - 17??	António de Barros Bezerra, Jr., Captain-Major	2nd Term, died in 1737
c. 1723 - 1727?	Pedro de Barros, Captain-Major	
1727? - 1730?	Manuel Lopes Lobo, Captain-Major	2nd Term
1730 - 1731	João Perestrelo, Captain-Major	
1731 - 1734	António de Barros Bezerra, Jr., Captain-Major	3rd Term, died in 1737
1733 - c. 1737	João Pereira de Carvalho, Captain-Major	
c. 1737 - c. 1740	Damião de Bastos, Captain-Major	
c. 1741 - 174?	Nicolau de Pina de Araújo, Captain-Major	
c. 1744	Manuel Pires Correia, Captain-Major	
c. 1747	Dionísio de Carvalho de Abreu, Captain-Major	
1748 - 1751	João de Távora, Captain-Major	(1703–1752)
1751 - c. 1755	Francisco Roque Souto-Maior, Captain-Major	
c. 1765 - 1766	Sebastião da Cunha Souto-Maior, Captain-Major	
1766 - 1770	Bernardo de Azevedo Coutinho, Captain-Major	
1770 - c. 1775	José Vicente Pereira, Captain-Major	
1775 - 1780	António Vaz de Araújo, Captain-Major	
2 June 1781 – December 1783	Pedro Correia de Seabra, Captain-Major	
17 de Dezembro de 1783 - 7 de Abril de 1784	António Teles de Meneses, Captain-Major	Died in office
1784? - 1786	João Pereira Barreto, Captain-Major	In office
May 1786 - c. October 1788	Luís Pedro de Araújo e Silva, Captain-Major	
c. 1788	Lopo de Almeida Henriques, Captain-Major	
May 1793 - 1797	Francisco Joaquim de Almeida Henriques, Captain-Major	
December 1797 - March 1801	Manuel Pinto de Gouveia, Captain-Major	
1801–1803	José Joaquim de Sousa Torvão, Captain-Major	
1803–1804	João António Pinto, Captain-Major	
1804	João Pereira Barreto, Jr, Captain_Major	1.º Mandato
1804-1811	João António Pinto, Captain-Major	
16 February 1812 – 22 August 1814	Joaquim José Rebelo de Figueiredo e Góis, Captain-Major	
April 1815 – 1818	João Cabral da Cunha Godolfim, Captain-Major	1st Term
December 1818 – 1819	João Teles de Meneses Drummond, Captain-Major	1st Term
1820–1821	José Correia de Barros, Captain-Major	
April 1821 – 1823	João de Araújo Gomes, Captain-Major	
December 1823–1826	João Cabral da Cunha Godolfim, Captain-Major	2nd Term
1826–182?	António Tavares da Veiga Santos, Captain-Major	
1829-182?	José Joaquim Lopes de Lima, Captain-Major	
1830-183?	João Cabral da Cunha Godolfim, Captain-Major	3rd Term
30 March 1834 – 1835	Honório Pereira Barreto, Captain-Major	1st Term (1833–59)
c. 1835–1837	José António Ferreira, Captain-Major	
1838–18??	Delfim José dos Santos, Captain-Major	
October 1842 – 1844	António dos Santos Chaves, Captain-Major	
August 1844 – 1846	José Xavier do Crato, Captain-Major	1st Term
1846–1848	Honório Barreto, Captain-Major	2nd Term
1848–c. 1849	José Xavier do Crato, Captain-Major	2nd Term
1852–1854	Honório Barreto, Captain-Major	3rd Term
c. 1864 - c. 1865	Joaquim Alberto Marques, Governor of Praça de Cacheu	
c. 1868 - c. 1871	João Carlos Cordeiro Lobo de Almeida Neto Fortes, Governor of Praça de Cacheu	

== See also ==
- Guinea-Bissau
  - Heads of State of Guinea-Bissau
  - Heads of Government of Guinea-Bissau
  - Colonial Heads of Portuguese Guinea
  - Colonial Heads of Bissau
- lists of incumbents
- List of national leaders
