= Lagoaça e Fornos =

- Civil parish
- Location in Portugal
- Coordinates: 41.19°N 6.73°W
- Country: Portugal
- Region: Norte
- Intermunic. comm.: Douro
- District: Bragança
- Municipality: Freixo de Espada à Cinta

Area
  - Total: 64.27 km^{2} (24.81 sq mi)

Population (2011)
  - Total: 617
  - Density: 9.6/km^{2} (25/sq mi)
- Time zone: UTC+00:00 (WET)
  - Summer (DST): UTC+01:00 (WEST)

Lagoaça e Fornos is a civil parish in the municipality of Freixo de Espada à Cinta, Portugal. It was formed in 2013 by the merger of the former parishes Lagoaça and Fornos. The population in 2011 was 617, in an area of 64.27 km^{2}. It is the only parish in Freixo de Espada à Cinta to be part of the Tierra de Miranda cultural region.
