= Honório Barreto =

Portuguese colonial administrator (1813-1859)

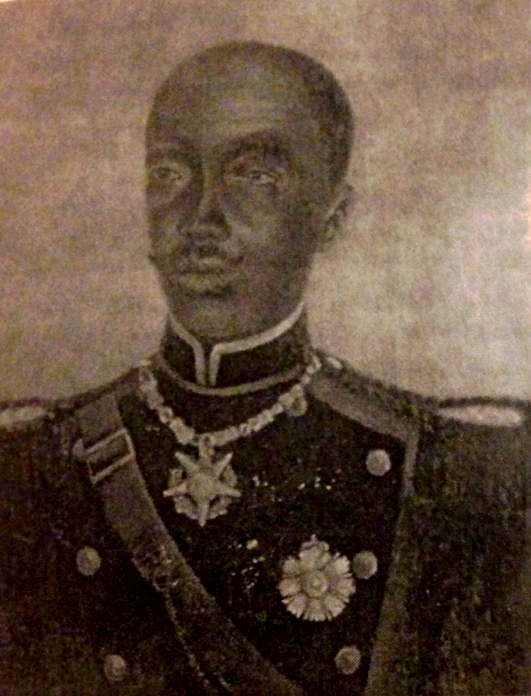
Honório Barreto.

Honório Pereira Barreto (April 24, 1813– April 16 or 26, 1859) was a governor of the Portuguese province of Guinea.

== Biography ==
Honório Barreto was born in Portuguese Guinea of a mother from Ziguinchor, Rosa Carvalho de Alvarenga, and Cape Verdean father João Pereira Barreto, Jr. He was educated in Lisbon. He maintained Portuguese control of the area and even extended its influence, in particular resisting French encroachment on the Casamance river. Prior to the independence of Guinea-Bissau, Barreto was cited by the Portuguese as the most famous governor and an example of what the local population might achieve. He was captain major (governor) of Cacheu for three terms, the first was between March 30, 1834 to 1835, the second between 1846 and 1848 and the third in 1852. However, Barreto also ran a family business with his mother from the settlement of Cacheu, where the principal products of their mercantile dealings were slaves. He was also captain major (governor) of Bissau as 27th Captain Major between 13 March 1837 and 27 June 1839, the 54th between 1840 and 1841, the 56th in 1853 and 1854 and the 59th from 19 April 1858 up to his death on 16 or 26 April 1859.

He died at Fortaleza de São José da Amura in Bissau at 8:30 AM on either 16 or 26 April 1859 when he was in service.

His name is spelled Barretto on the cover and title-page of his 1843 book Memoria sobre o estado actual de Senegambia portugueza [microform] : causas de sua decadencia, e meios de a fazer prosperar (Lisboa : Typ. da viuva Coelho).

== Honours ==
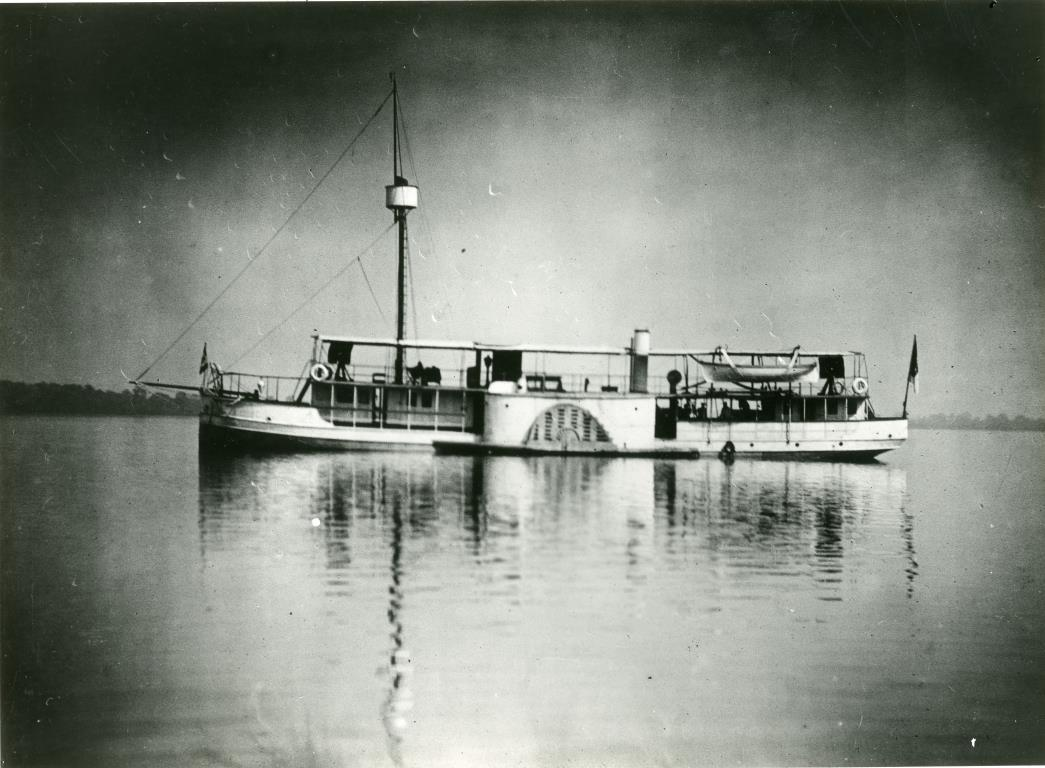
Gunboat Honório Barreto (1895-1907).

He was featured in a $500 and $1000 Guinea-Bissau escudo.

A corvette of the Portuguese Navy was named after him. Also a small street (as a largo) is named after him in the parish of Beato, Lisbon.

== See also ==
- List of Captains-Major of Bissau
- List of Captains-Major of Cacheu

== Notes ==
Preceded by José Eleutério Rocha Vieira	Captain-Major of Bissau; 1836 – 1839	Succeeded by José Gonçalves Barbosa
Preceded by José Gonçalves Barbosa	Captain-Major of Bissau; 1840 – 1841	Succeeded by José Paulo Machado
Preceded by José Xavier do Crato	Captain-Major of Cacheu; 1846 – 1848	Succeeded by José Xavier do Crato
Preceded by José Xavier do Crato	Captain-Major of Cacheu; 1852 – 1854	Succeeded by Joaquim Alberto Marques
Preceded by Pedro Henriques Romão Ferreira	Captain-Major of Bissau; 1855 – 1858	Succeeded by António Pereira Mouzinho de Albuquerque Cota Falcão
Preceded by António Pereira Mouzinho de Albuquerque Cota Falcão	Captain-Major of Bissau; 1858 – 1859	Succeeded by António Cândido Zagalo
