= Sarmento Rodrigues =

Portuguese colonial governor

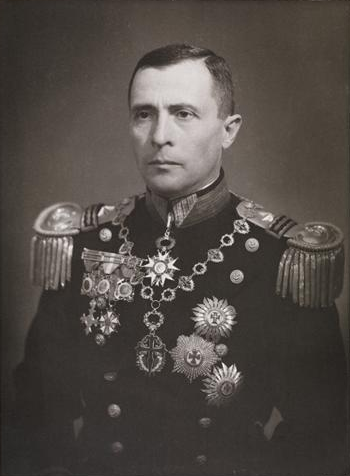
- Portrait of Manuel Sarmento Rodrigues
- Born: Manuel Maria Sarmento Rodrigues; 15 June 1899; Freixo de Espada à Cinta, Portugal
- Died: 1 August 1979 (aged 80); Lisbon, Portugal
- Alma mater: University of Coimbra, Portuguese Naval School, Escola Superior Colonial
- Military career
- Allegiance: Portugal
- Branch: Navy
- Units: República, Lis, Pero de Alenquer
- Commands: Lima

Governor General of Portuguese Mozambique
- In office 1961–1964

Ministry of the Colonies/Governor General of Salazar
- In office 1950–1961

Governor of Portuguese Guinea
- In office 1946–1949

Manuel Maria Sarmento Rodrigues (15 June 1899 – 1 August 1979) was a naval officer, colonist and professor. He was born in 1899 in Freixo de Espada à Cinta, Portugal. He attended a secondary school in Bragança and attended the University of Coimbra. He entered the Naval School and concluded the marine course in 1921.

As a junior officer, he embarked in the República on board which he was accompanied by Gago Coutinho and Sacadura Cabral through the South Atlantic and in the Lis, he was the aide-de-camp of the Governor-General of Portuguese India and on board the transport Pero de Alenquer. He gave assistance to the victims of the 1926 Horta earthquake. He travelled extensively to the Portuguese colonies of the Far East and Africa.

In 1936, he was part of the Hydrographic Mission of the Adjacent Islands. He was put in charge in the survey of the seas of the Azores and the Madeira islands.

In 1941, he assumed the command of the torpedo-boat destroyer Lima, which he kept until 1945. Under his command, the Lima participated in various operations of rescues of torpedo ships in the seas of the Azores during World War II. He later attended Escola Superior Colonial.

As a senior official, he became a colonial administrator, being the Governor of Portuguese Guinea between 1946 and 1949. In 1950, he became governor general of Salazar as Ministry of the Colonies (partly in 1951, Ministry of Ultramar), having these implemented functions on the vast reform of the Portuguese colonial administration, he visited the Far East, Southeast Asia and Africa. Between 1961 and 1964, he was governor general of Portuguese Mozambique.

He died in Lisbon on 1 August 1979 at the age of 80.

He is an author of Ancoradouros das Ilhas dos Açores (Anchorage of the Azores Islands) and No Governo da Guiné: Discursos e Afirmações (1949).
