= List of churches in Portugal =

The following is a list of churches in Portugal by district or autonomous region.

== Aveiro District ==
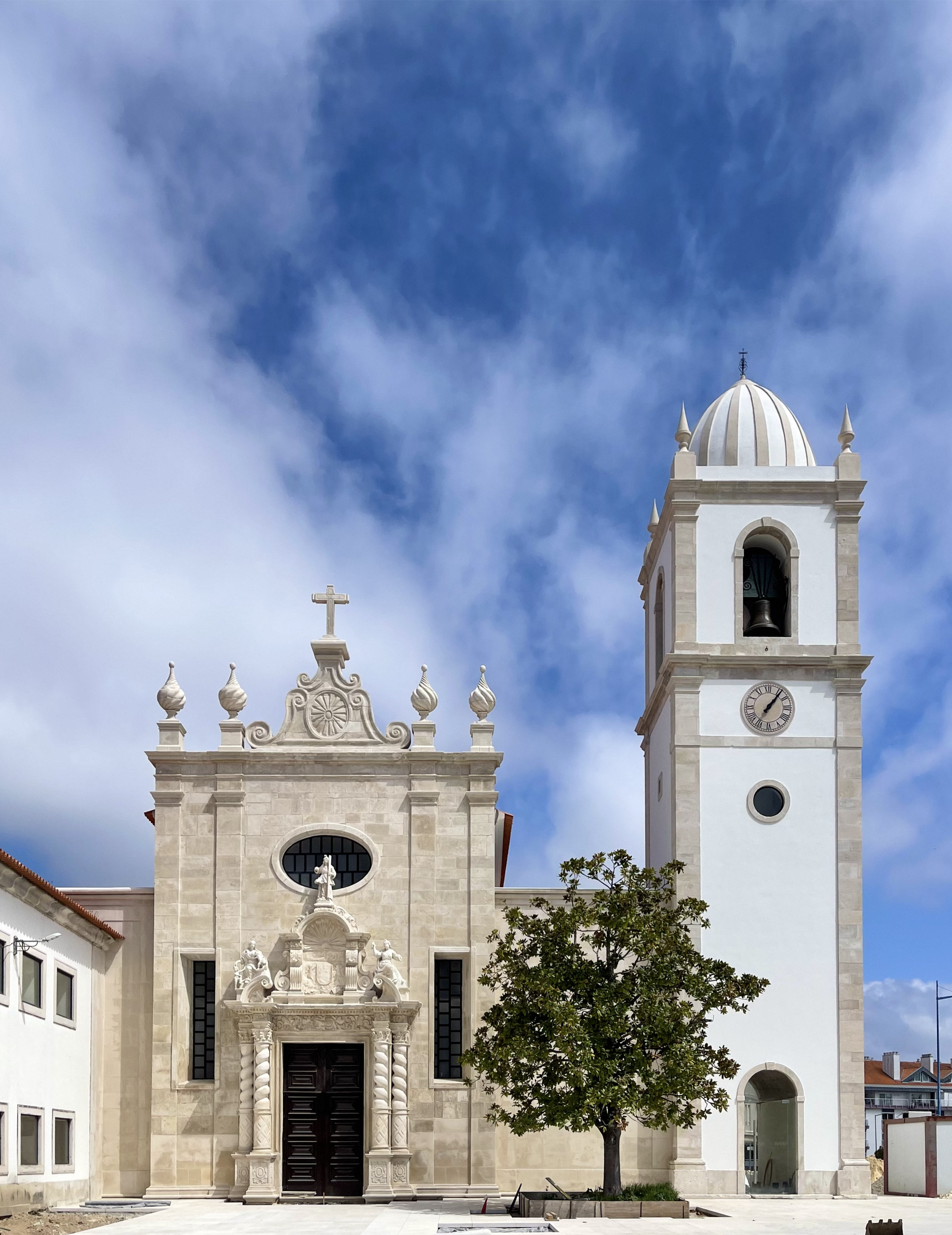
Cathedral of Aveiro

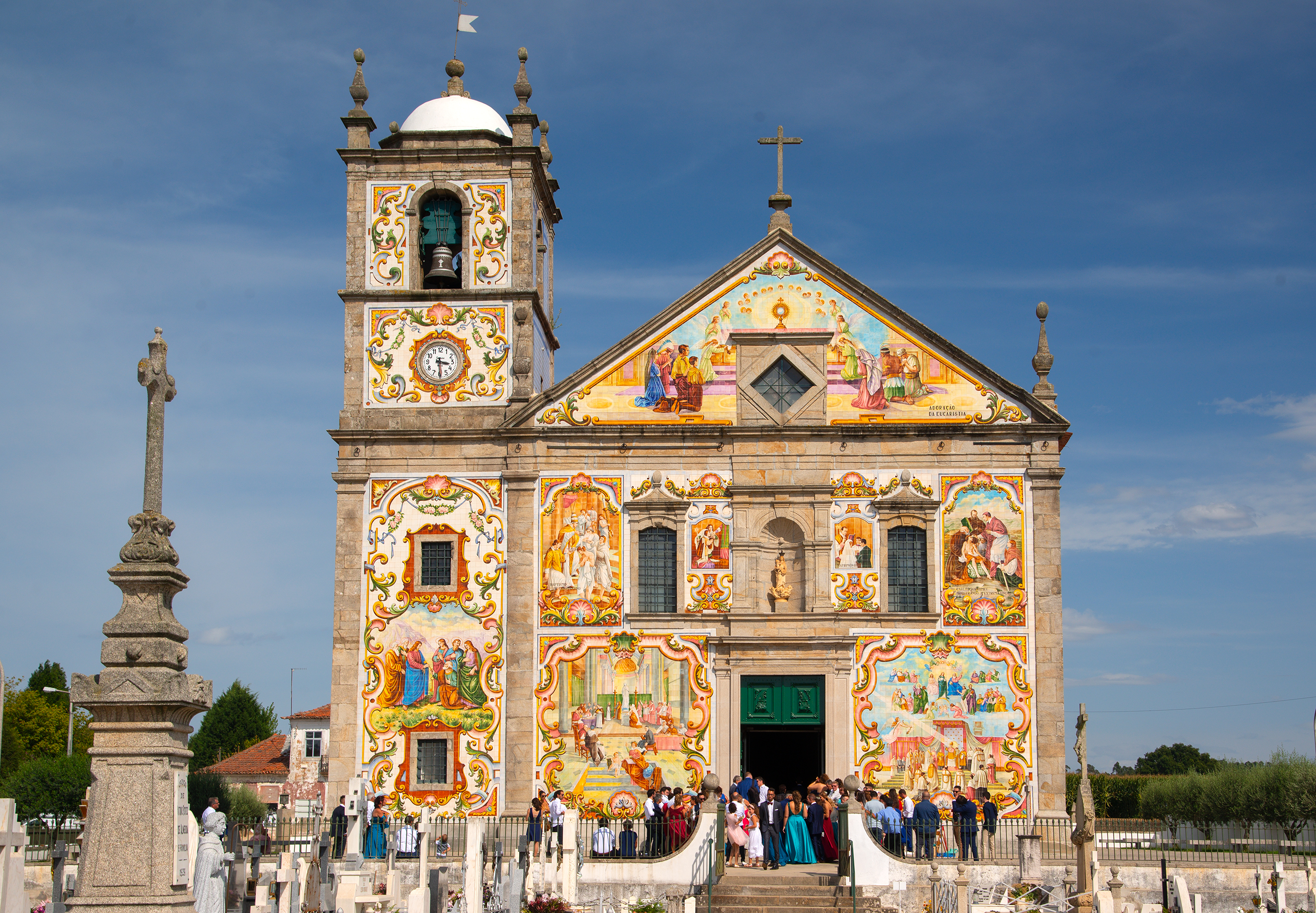
Igreja matriz de Santa Maria de valega; Válega

- Capela de Nossa Senhora do Desterro (Arada)
- Capela do Senhor do Calvário
- Cathedral of Aveiro
- Church of São João Evangelista
- Igreja Matriz de Arrifana
- Igreja Matriz de Santa Marinha de Cortegaça
- Igreja Matriz de São Cristóvão
- Igreja Paroquial de São Martinho do Bispo
- Igreja Paroquial de Válega (also known as Igreja matriz de Santa Maria de Válega)
- Igreja de Trofa
- Igreja Matriz de Belazaima do Chão
- Igreja da Misericórdia de Santa Maria da Feira
- Igreja de Roge
- Igreja de São Martinho (Argoncilhe)
- Igreja de São Tiago de Silvalde

== Azores ==
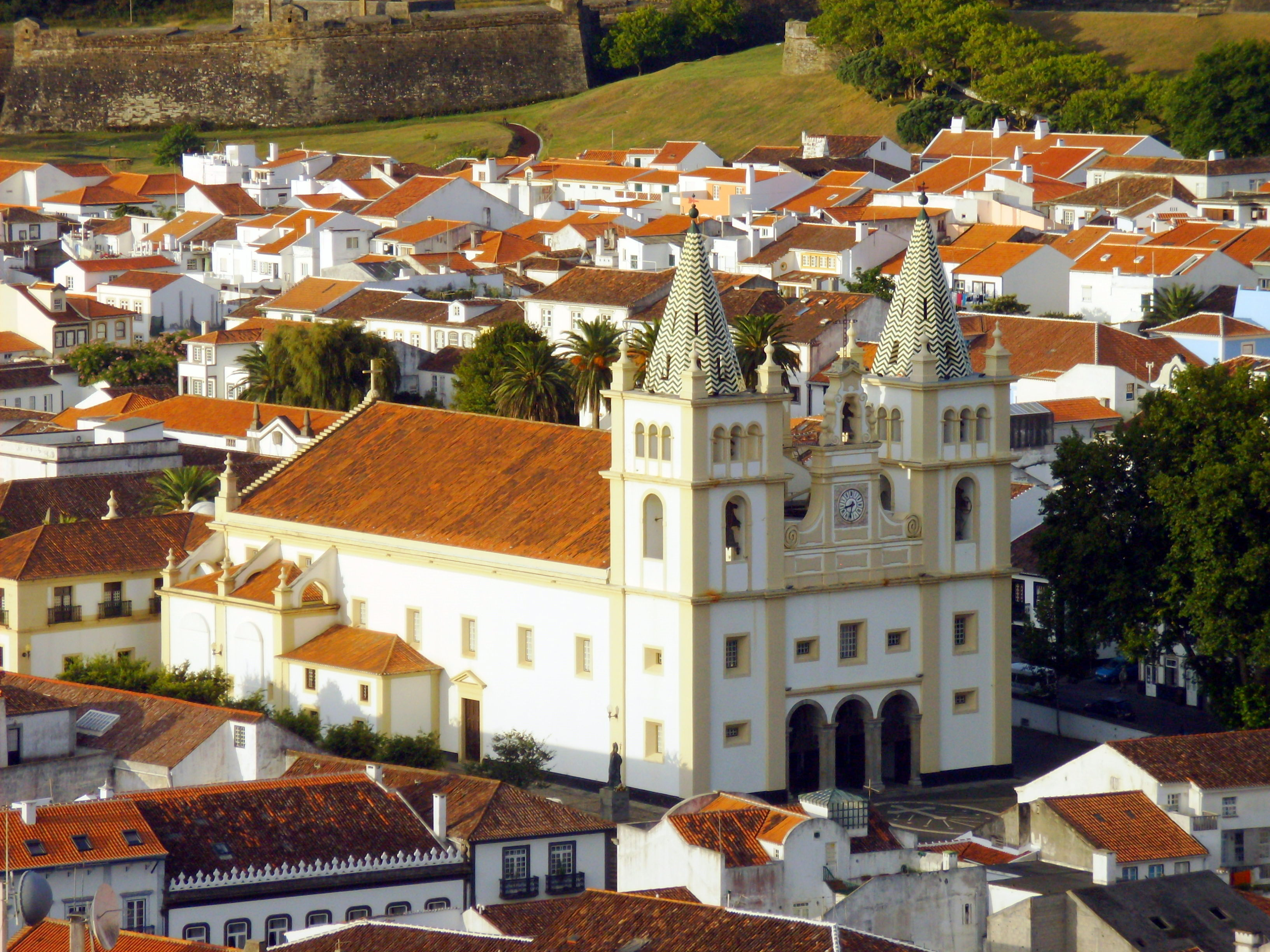
Sé Cathedral of Angra do Heroísmo

=== Corvo ===
- Church of Nossa Senhora dos Milagres (Corvo)

=== Flores ===
- Church of Nossa Senhora da Conceição (Santa Cruz das Flores)
- Church of Nossa Senhora de Lourdes (Fazenda)
- Church of São Pedro (Ponta Delgada)
- Church of Nossa Senhora do Pilar (Cedros)
- Church of Benditas Almas (Caveira)
- Church of Nossa Senhora do Rosário (Lajes das Flores)
- Church of Nossa Senhora dos Remédios (Fajazinha)
- Church of São Caetano (Lomba)
- Church of Nossa Senhora dos Milagres (Lajedo)
- Church of Santíssima Trindade (Mosteiro)

=== Faial ===
- Church of Santíssima Trindade (Capelo)
- Church of Nossa Senhora da Conceição (Horta)
- Matriz do Santissimo Salvador (Horta)
- Church of Nossa Senhora das Angústias (Horta)
- Church of Divino Espirito Santo (Feteira)
- Church of Nossa Senhora da Graça (Praia do Almoxarife)
- Church of Santa Catarina (Castelo Branco)
- Church of Nossa Senhora da Ajuda (Pedro Miguel)
- Church of Nossa Senhora da Luz (Flamengos)
- Church of Nossa Senhora das Dores (Praia do Norte)
- Church of São Mateus (Ribeirinha)
- Church of Nossa Senhora do Socorro (Salão)
- Church of Santa Bárbara (Horta)

=== Pico ===
- Church of Nossa Senhora da Boa Nova (Bandeiras)
- Church of São Sebastião (Calheta do Nesquim)
- Church of Nossa Senhora das Candeias
- Church of Nossa Senhora das Dores (Criação Velha)

=== São Jorge ===
- Church of Nossa Senhora do Rosário (Calheta)
- Church of Santa Catarina (Calheta)
- Church of São Mateus da Calheta
- Church of São Mateus da Calheta (Old)

=== Graciosa ===
- Church of Nossa Senhora de Guadalupe (Graciosa)
- Church of Santa Cruz (Graciosa)
- Church of São Mateus (Graciosa)
- Church of Nossa Senhora da Luz (Graciosa)

=== Terceira ===
- Sé Cathedral of Angra do Heroísmo

=== São Miguel ===
- Church of the Jesuit College (Ponta Delgada)

=== Santa Maria ===
- Church of Santa Bárbara (Vila do Porto)
- Church of Nossa Senhora do Bom Despacho

== Beja District ==
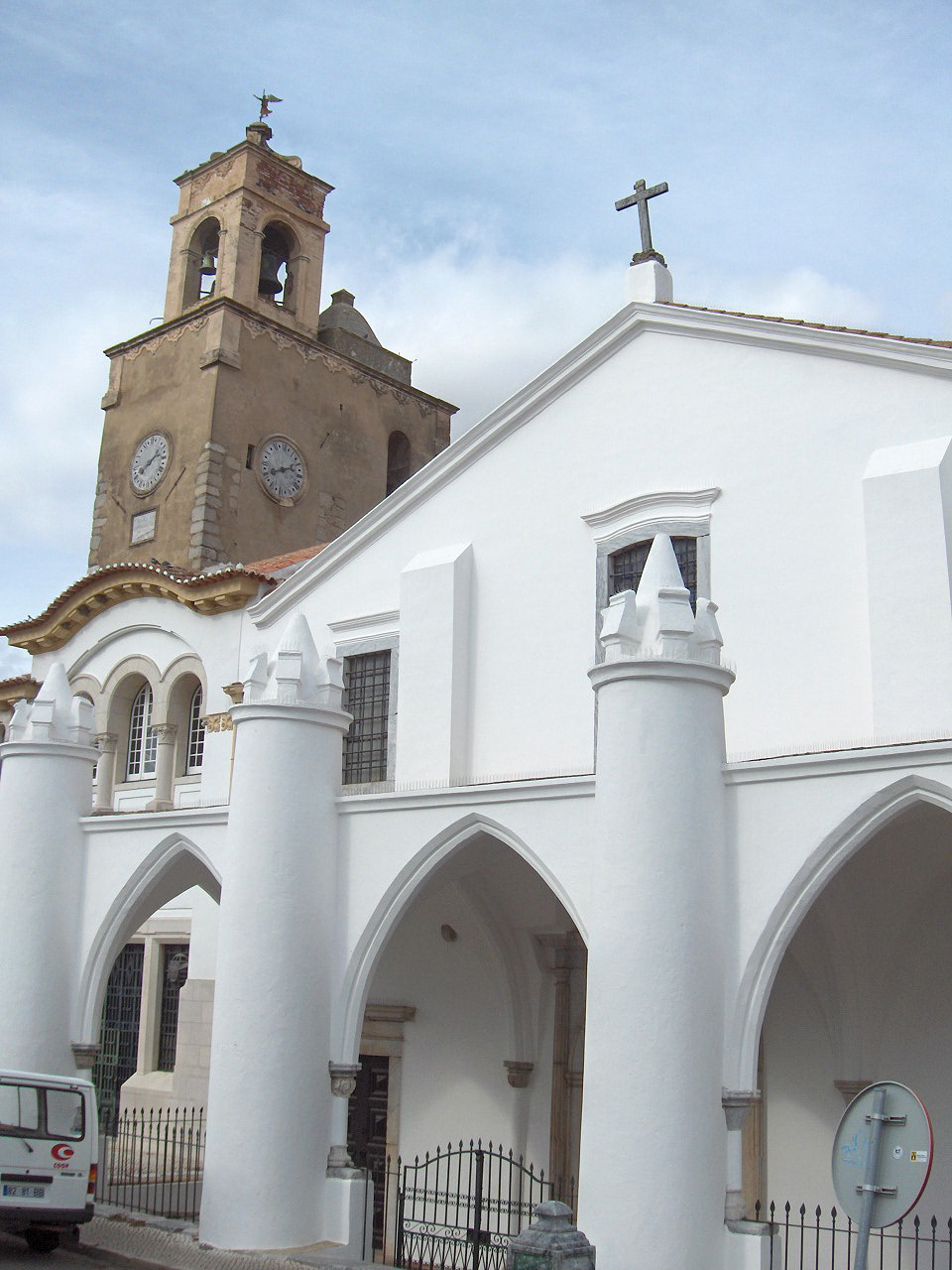
Igreja Matriz de Santa Maria da Feira

- Basílica Real de Castro Verde
- Igreja de São Vicente (Cuba)
- Igreja Matriz de Santa Maria da Feira
- Igreja Matriz de São Vicente de Cuba
- Igreja de Nossa Senhora da Conceição (Santa Maria da Feira)
- Igreja de Nossa Senhora da Estrela
- Igreja de Nossa Senhora dos Prazeres de Beja
- Igreja Matriz de Vila de Frades
- Igreja de São Miguel (Póvoa de São Miguel)
- Igreja de Nossa Senhora da Anunciação
- Igreja Paroquial de Safara
- Igreja de Santa Maria (Serpa)
- Igreja Paroquial de Santo Aleixo da Restauração
- Igreja de São João Batista (Moura)

== Braga District ==
Igreja do Bom Jesus

- Bom Jesus do Monte
- Braga Cathedral
- Capela da Senhora da Luz
- Carmo Church (Braga)
- Chapel of São Frutuoso
- Church of Fontarcada
- Church of São Miguel do Castelo
- Coimbras Chapel
- Congregados Basilica
- Falperra Church
- Holy Cross Church, Braga
- Igreja de Fontarcada
- Igreja de Nossa Senhora da Oliveira (Guimarães)
- Igreja de Santa Eulália do Mosteiro de Arnoso
- Igreja de Santa Maria de Abade de Neiva
- Igreja de São Romão de Arões
- Igreja de Vilar de Frades
- Igreja do Bom Jesus
- Igreja Matriz de Barcelos
- Igreja Matriz de São Martinho de Candoso
- Igreja Paroquial de Creixomil
- Igreja Paroquial de S. Jorge de Abadim
- Igreja Paroquial de Vermoim
- Igreja de Santiago de Antas
- Igreja de São Miguel do Castelo
- Igreja de São Romão de Arões
- Misericórdia Church
- Monastery of São Martinho de Tibães
- Mosteiro de Landim
- Pópulo Church
- Saint Eulália Church
- Sameiro Sanctuary
- Santuário de Nossa Senhora do Pilar
- Santuário de Nossa Senhora da Abadia
- Santuário de Nossa Senhora do Bom Despacho
- Santuário de Nossa Senhora do Porto de Ave
- São Bento da Porta Aberta
- St Paul's Church, Braga
- St Vincent's Church, Braga

== Coimbra District ==
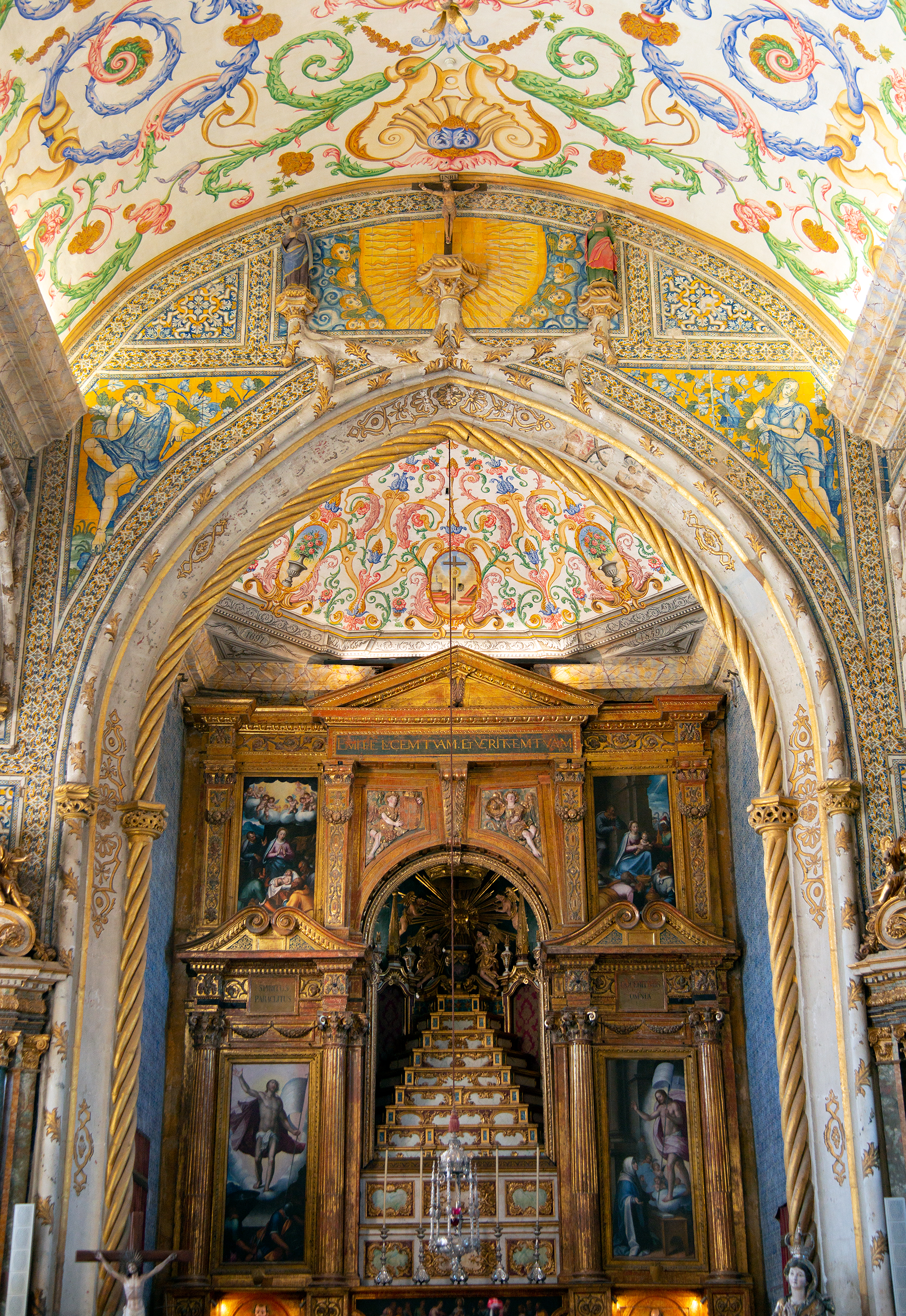
Altar area, São Miguel, University of Coimbra

- Capela de São Miguel (Capela da Universidade de Coimbra)
- Igreja da Graça
- Igreja de Santiago
- Monastery of Santa Clara-a-Nova
- Monastery of Santa Clara-a-Velha
- Monastery of Santa Cruz
- New Cathedral of Coimbra
- Old Cathedral of Coimbra
- Church of São Gião

== Évora District ==
- Cathedral of Évora
- Igreja do Espírito Santo
- Igreja de Nossa Senhora da Boa Fé
- Igreja dos Lóios
- Church of Nossa Senhora da Graça
- Igreja Matriz de Pavia
- Igreja de São Francisco (Estremoz)
- Igreja de São Francisco (Évora)
- Igreja de São Mamede
- Igreja de São Tiago
- Igreja Matriz de Viana do Alentejo

== Faro District ==
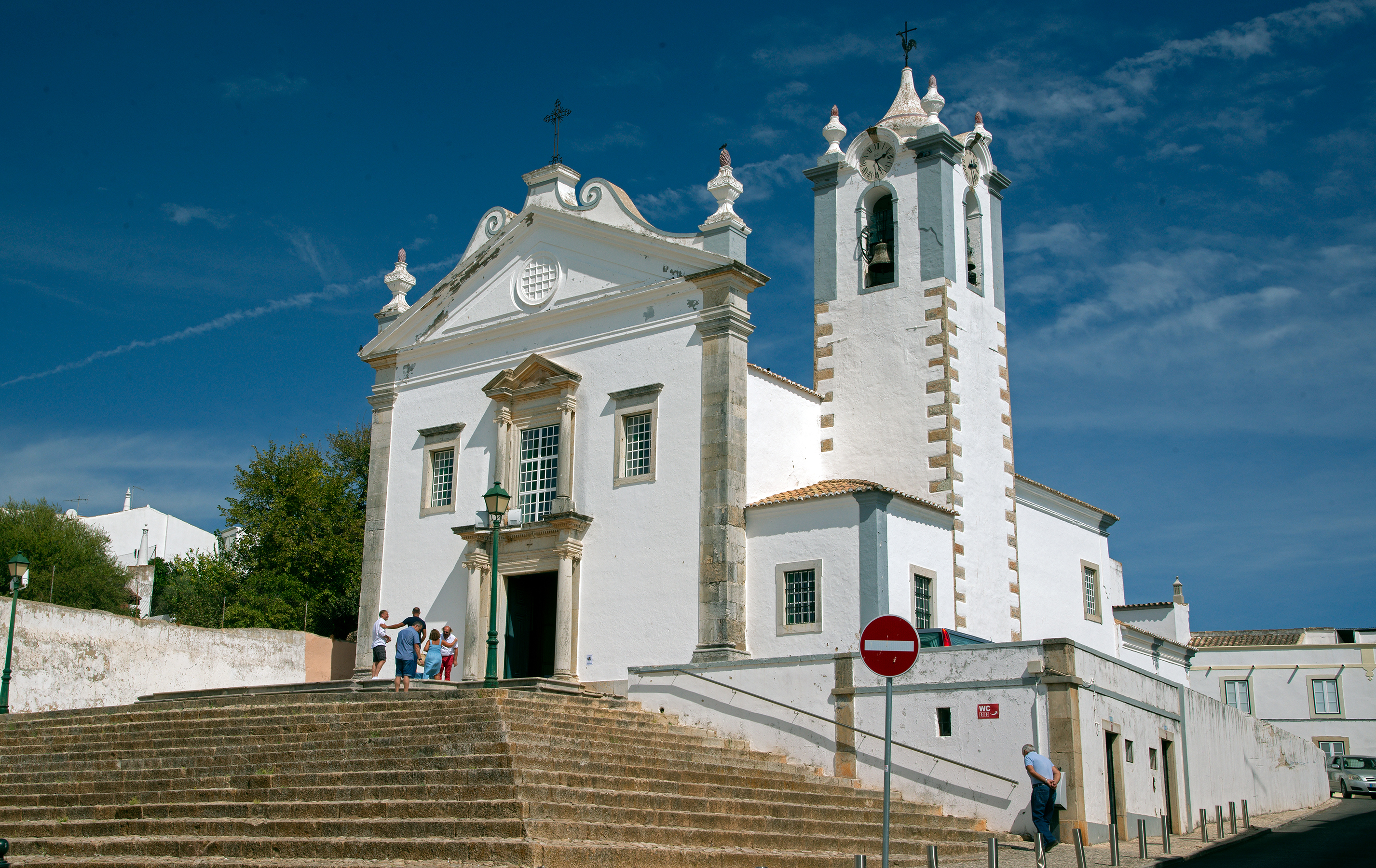
Igreja Matriz de Estoi

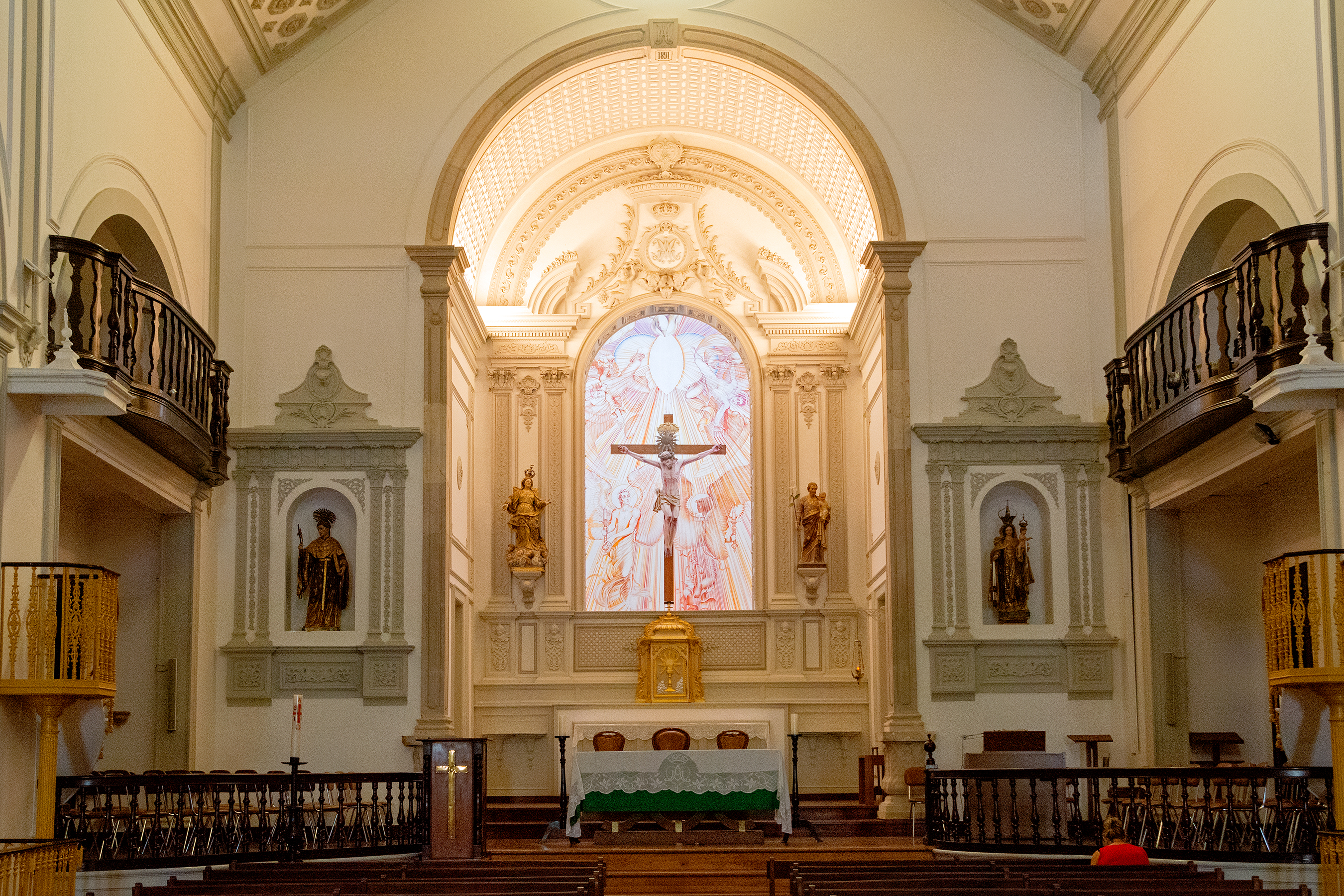
Igreja de Santa Maria, Lagos

- Cathedral of Faro
- Hermitage of Our Lady of Guadalupe
- Igreja da Misericórdia de Tavira
- Igreja de Santa Maria do Castelo
- Igreja de Santo António
- Igreja de São Sebastião
- Church of Nossa Senhora da Encarnação
- Church of Nossa Senhora da Luz
- Church of São Lourenço
- Church of São Tiago
- Silves Cathedral
- Igreja Matriz de Estoi
- Igreja de Nossa Senhora da Esperança

== Leiria District ==
- Church of Nossa Senhora da Nazaré
- Igreja da Exaltação de Santa Cruz
- Igreja de Nossa Senhora do Pópulo
- Igreja de São Gião
- Igreja de São João Baptista
- Igreja de São Leonardo
- Igreja de São Pedro
- Igreja do Convento do Louriçal
- Church of the Santíssima Trindade

== Lisbon District ==
- Convent of the Capuchos
- Igreja da Penha Longa
- Igreja da Póvoa de Santo Adrião
- Igreja de Santa Maria (Loures)
- Igreja de Santa Maria (Sintra)
- Igreja de Santa Maria do Castelo
- Igreja de Santo André
- Igreja de São Quintino
- Igreja do Convento Santo António da Lourinhã
- Jerónimos Monastery
- Monastery of São Dinis de Odivelas
- Palace of Mafra

=== Lisbon ===
- Church of Santa Engrácia
- Estrela Basilica
- Igreja da Madalena
- Igreja da Madre de Deus
- Igreja da Memória
- Igreja de Chelas
- Igreja de Nossa Senhora da Luz
- Igreja de Santa Luzia
- Igreja de Santo Estêvão
- Igreja de São Domingos
- Igreja de São Roque
- Igreja do Menino Deus
- Lisbon Cathedral
- Monastery of São Vicente de Fora
- Church of Nossa Senhora da Conceição Velha
- Santo António Church
- St Andrew's Church
- St. George's Church

== Madeira ==
- Cathedral of Funchal (Sé Catedral)
- Igreja de São João Evangelista (Colégio church)
- Igreja de São Pedro
- Convento de Santa Clara
- Capela das Almas Pobres
- Igreja do Carmo
- Holy Trinity Church (English church)
- Igreja de Santa Maria Maior (Santiago Menor Church or Igreja de Socorro)
- Capela do Corpo Santo
- Capela da Boa Viagem
- Igreja de Nossa Senhora do Monte
- Igreja Paroquial de Machico
- Capela dos Milagres
- Capela de São Vicente
- Capela de Nossa Senhora da Piedade
- Igreja de Santo António
- Igreja de São Martinho
- Igreja da Nazaré

== Porto District ==
- Church of Bom Pastor
- Igreja de Nossa Senhora do Ó de Águas Santas
- Igreja de Santa Clara
- Igreja de Santa Maria de Airães
- Igreja de Santo André
- Igreja de São Cristóvão de Rio Mau
- Igreja de São Gens de Boelhe
- Igreja de São Gonçalo
- Igreja de São Martinho de Cedofeita
- Igreja de São Miguel de Entre-os-Rios
- Igreja de São Pedro
- Igreja de São Pedro de Ferreira
- Igreja de São Pedro de Roriz
- Igreja de São Vicente de Sousa
- Igreja Matriz de Vila do Conde

=== Porto ===
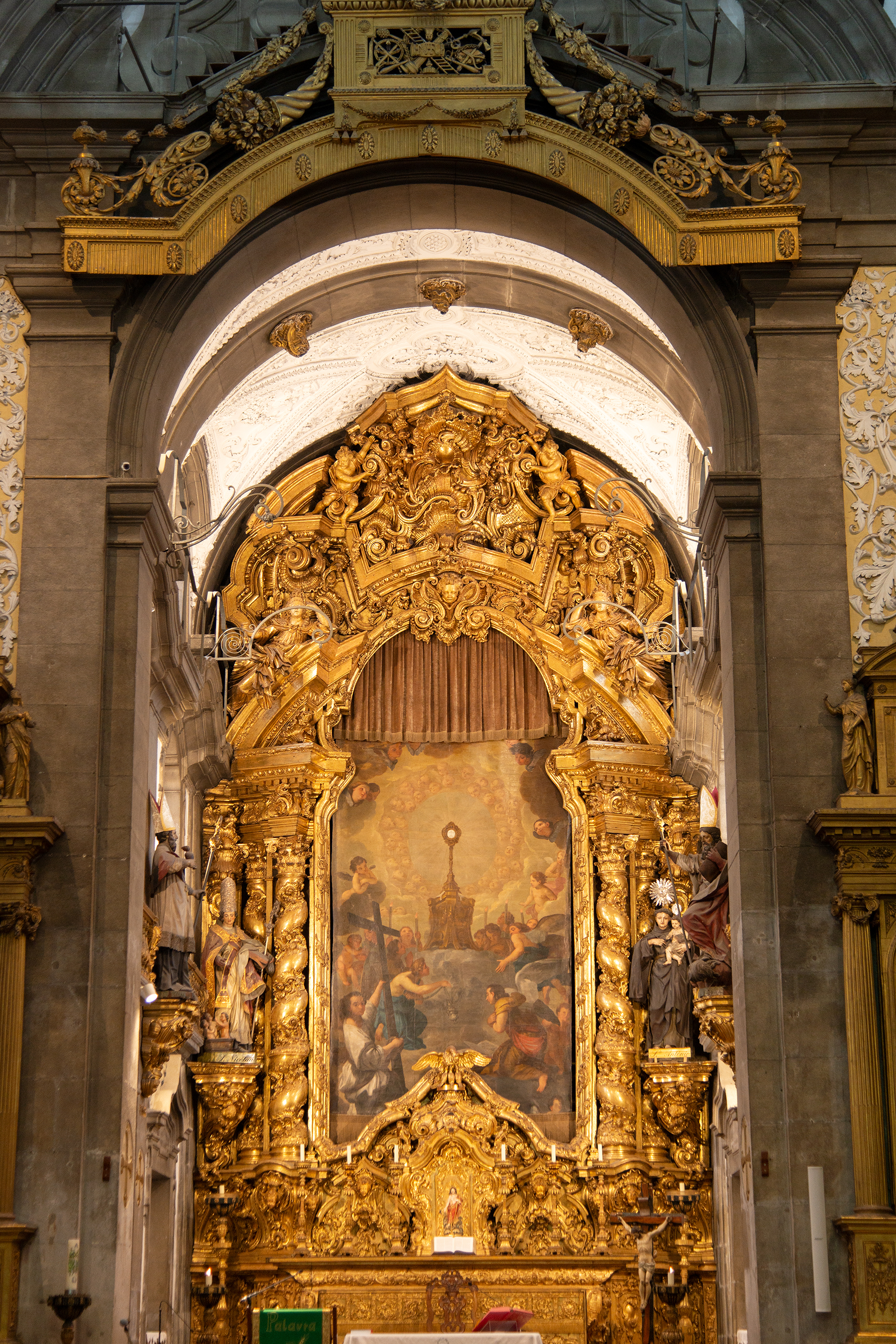
Igreja Paroquial de São Nicolau

- Igreja Paroquial de São Nicolau

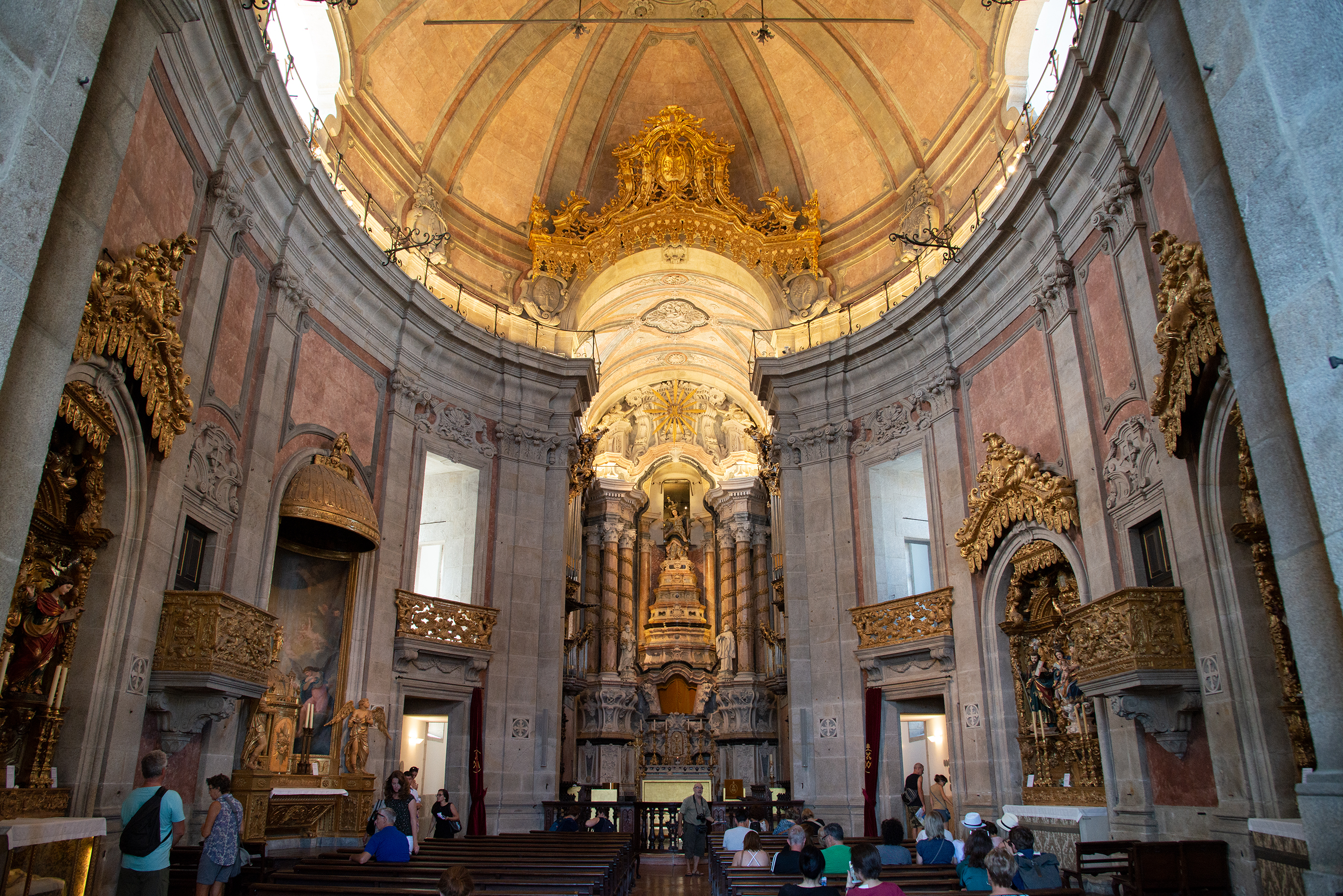
Igreja dos Clérigos, 2019

- Antiga Casa da Câmara
- Church of Saint Ildefonso
- Church of São Francisco
- Church of São Martinho de Cedofeita
- Clérigos Church
- Igreja de São Bento da Vitória
- Igreja dos Grilos
- Porto Cathedral

=== Póvoa de Varzim ===
- Coração de Jesus Basilica
- Lapa Church
- Matriz Church of Póvoa de Varzim
- Monastery of Rates
- Senhora das Dores Church

== Santarém District ==
- Church of Atalaia
- Igreja da Graça
- Igreja da Misericórdia de Santarém
- Igreja de Santa Clara
- Igreja de Santa Maria de Marvila
- Igreja de São João Baptista
- Igreja de São João de Alporão
- Igreja de São Nicolau
- Igreja do Santíssimo Milagre
- Igreja e Convento de Nossa Senhora de Jesus do Sítio
- Igreja Matriz da Golegã
- Our Lady of the Assumption Cathedral
- Church of Santa Maria do Olival

== Setúbal District ==
- Igreja de Santiago de Palmela
- Igreja de São João Baptista
- Igreja de São Julião
- Igreja do antigo Mosteiro de Jesus
- Igreja Matriz de Santiago do Cacém
- Church of Porto Covo

== Viana do Castelo District ==
- Church of Fiães
- Igreja de Bravães
- Igreja de Longos Vales
- Igreja de São Fins de Friestas
- Igreja Matriz de Caminha
- Longos Vales's Monastery
- Church of the Misericórdia de Valadares
- Church of Senhor do Socorro
- Church of São Martinho
- Church of São Pedro de Rubiães
- Church of São Salvador de Paderne

== Viseu District ==
- Igreja de Nossa Senhora da Conceição
- Igreja de São Martinho de Mouros
- Igreja de São Miguel
- Igreja Matriz de Santa Marinha de Trevões
- Viseu Cathedral

== See also ==
- History of Roman Catholicism in Portugal
- List of cathedrals in Portugal
- List of churches in Póvoa de Varzim
- List of Roman Catholic dioceses in Portugal
