= Igreja de Santa Maria do Castelo =

Igreja de Santa Maria do Castelo may refer to:

- Igreja de Santa Maria do Castelo (Lourinhã), a church in Portugal
- Igreja de Santa Maria do Castelo (Tavira), a church in Portugal
