= Igreja do Convento Santo António da Lourinhã =

Church in Lourinhães Municipality, Portugal

Coordinates: 39.2426°N 9.3129°W

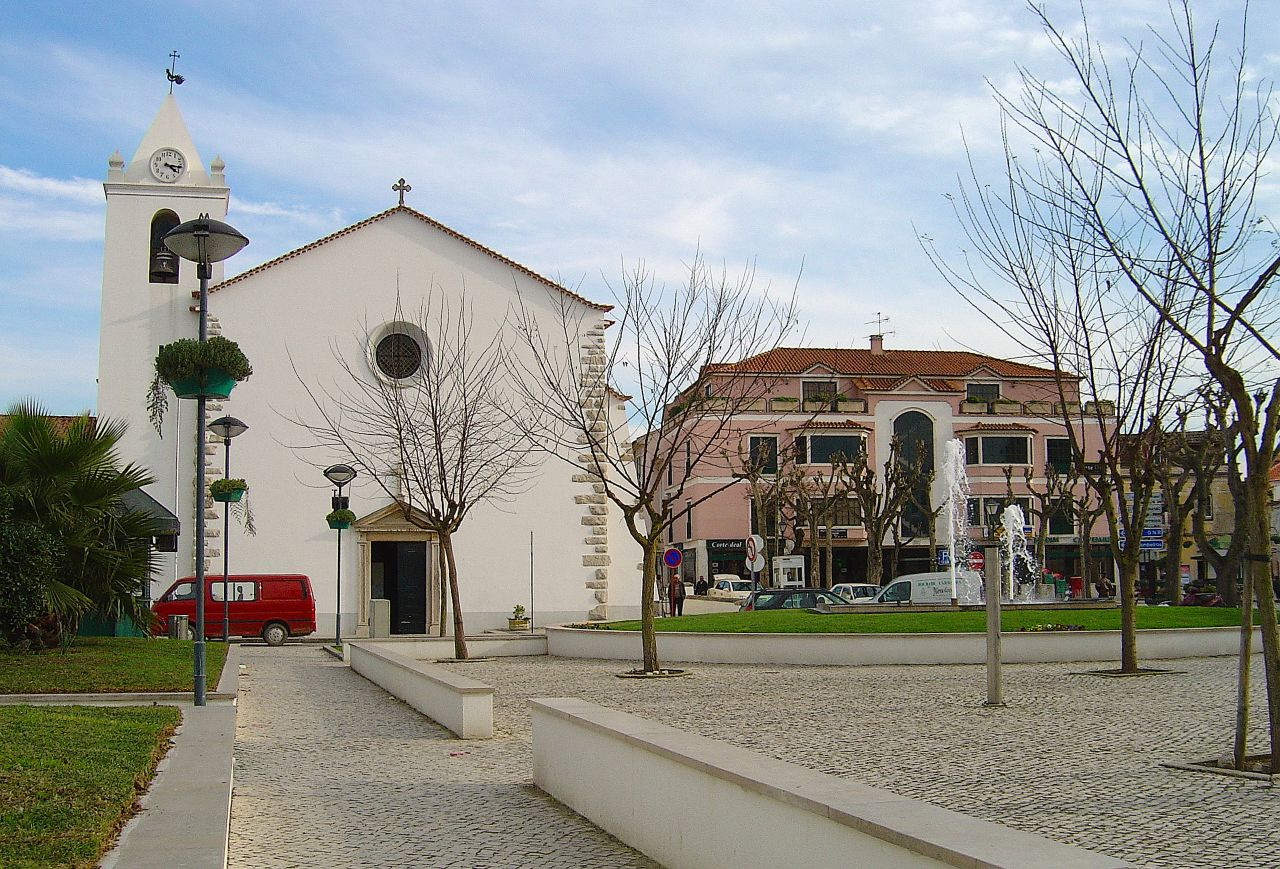
Igreja do Convento Santo António da Lourinhã

Igreja do Convento Santo António da Lourinhã is a church in Portugal. It is classified as a National Monument.
