= Igreja de São Miguel de Entre-os-Rios =

Church in Penafiel, Portugal

Coordinates: 41.0832907°N 8.2991809°W

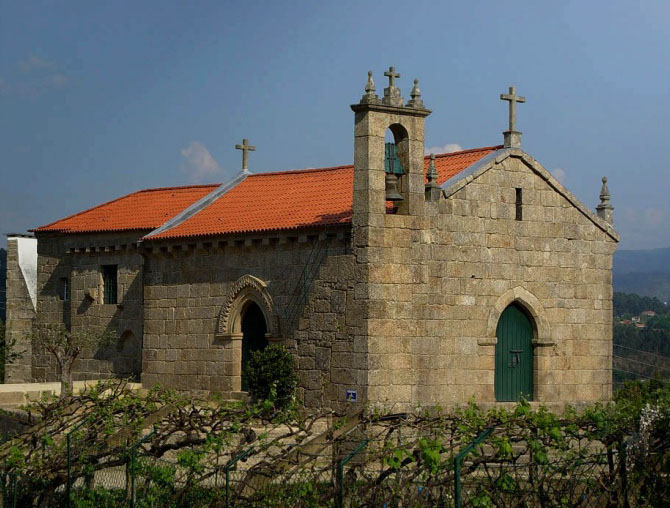

Igreja de São Miguel de Entre-os-Rios is a church in Portugal. It is classified as a National Monument.
