= Igreja de Nossa Senhora do Ó de Águas Santas =

Church in Maia, Porto District, Portugal

Coordinates: 41.6182702°N 8.3205503°W

Igreja de Nossa Senhora do Ó de Águas Santas is a church in Portugal. It is classified as a National Monument.
