= Igreja do Santíssimo Milagre =

Church in Santarém, Portugal

Coordinates: 39.233409°N 8.682010°W

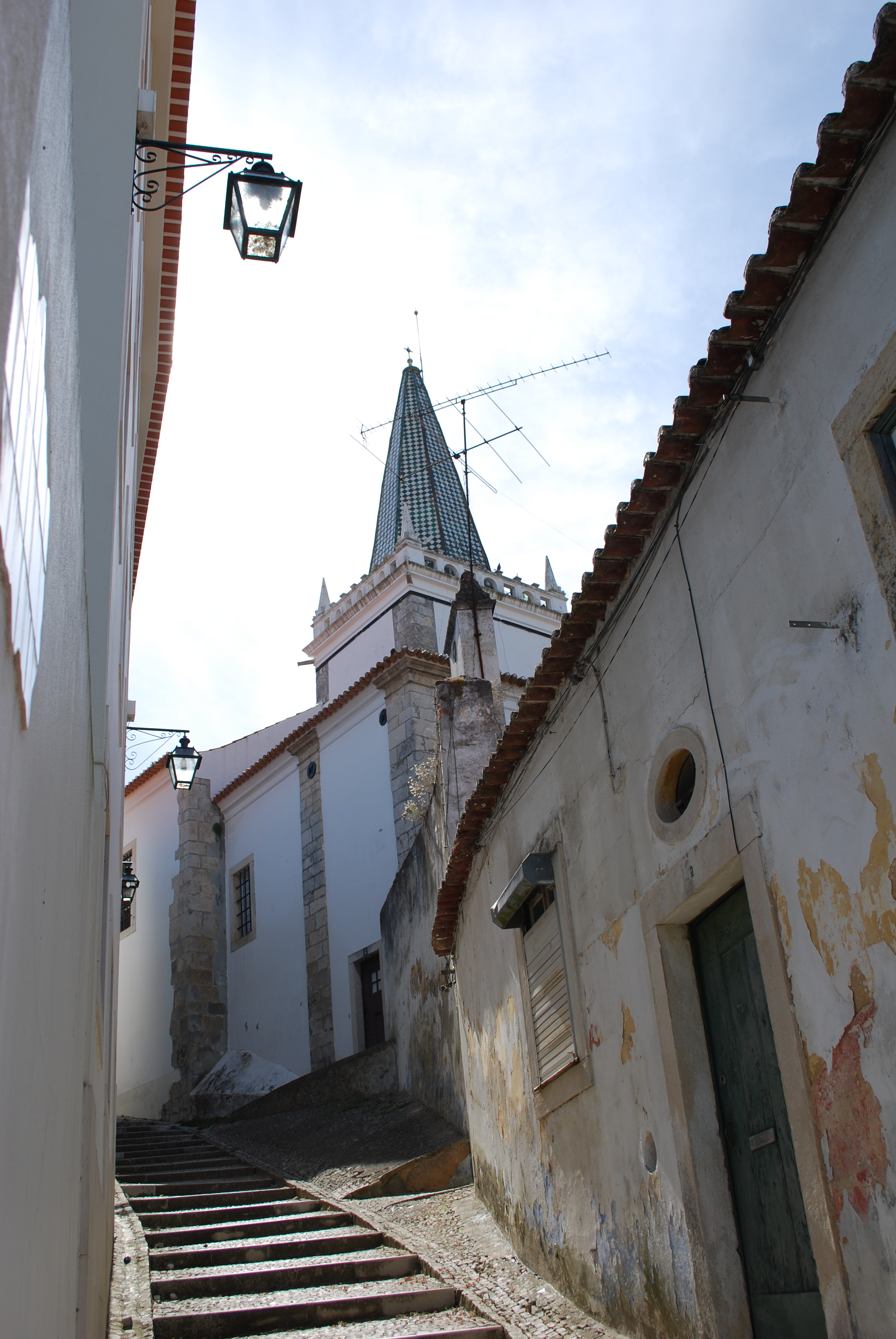
Igreja do Santíssimo Milagre

Igreja do Santíssimo Milagre is a church in Portugal. It is classified as a National Monument.
