= Igreja de São Leonardo =

Church building in Peniche, Leiria District, Portugal

Coordinates: 39°20′19″N 9°19′33″W

Igreja de São Leonardo in 2015

Igreja de São Leonardo is a church in Portugal. It is classified as a National Monument.
