= Igreja Matriz de Pavia =

Church in Mora, Portugal

Coordinates: 38.8969°N 8.0160°W

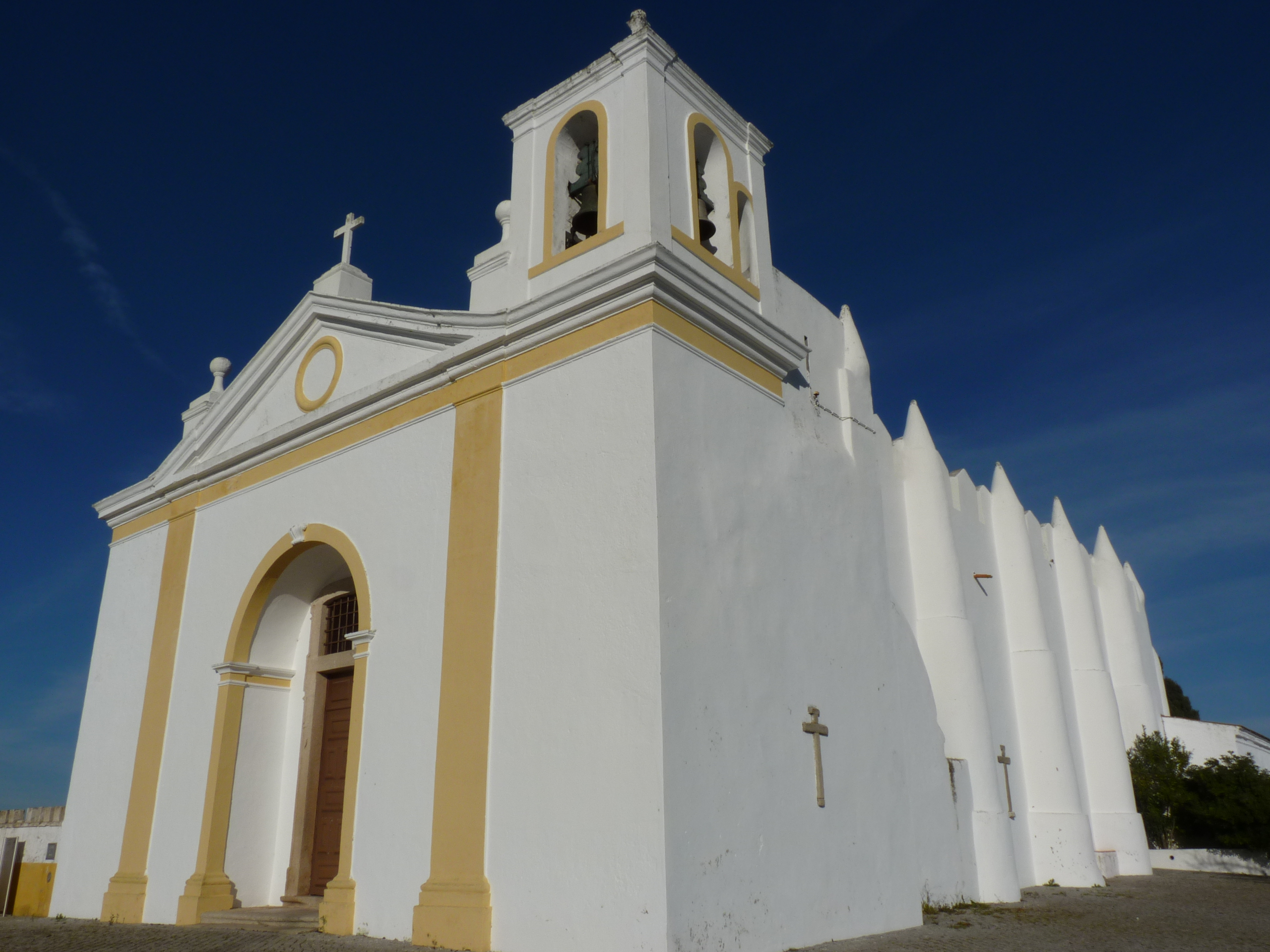
Igreja Matriz de Pavia

Igreja Matriz de Pavia is a church in Portugal. It is classified as a National Monument.
