= Igreja da Misericórdia de Santarém =

Portuguese church

Igreja da Misericórdia de Santarém is a church in Portugal. Built in 1559, it has the signature of the royal house of Miguel Arruda. It is classified as a National Monument.

The Santa Casa da Misericórdia de Santarém was founded in 1559 by Friar Martinho de Santarém, following the indication of Friar Miguel Contreiras, who four years earlier had founded the Misericórdia de Lisboa . At the end of the first decade of the 16th century, D. Manuel I granted the same privileges as the Lisbon institution to the Escabitan Brotherhood, enjoying royal protection from then on. The Brotherhood's first headquarters operated at the Hospital de João Afonso, until the completion of works on the church and the annex building
