= Igreja do Convento do Louriçal =

Church in Portugal

Coordinates: 40.0033676°N 8.7388998°W

- Igreja do Convento do Louriçal

Igreja do Convento do Louriçal is a church in Portugal. It is classified as a National Monument.
