= Igreja de Santa Maria de Airães =

Church in Felgueiras, Porto District, Portugal

Coordinates: 41.3149272°N 8.1986694°W

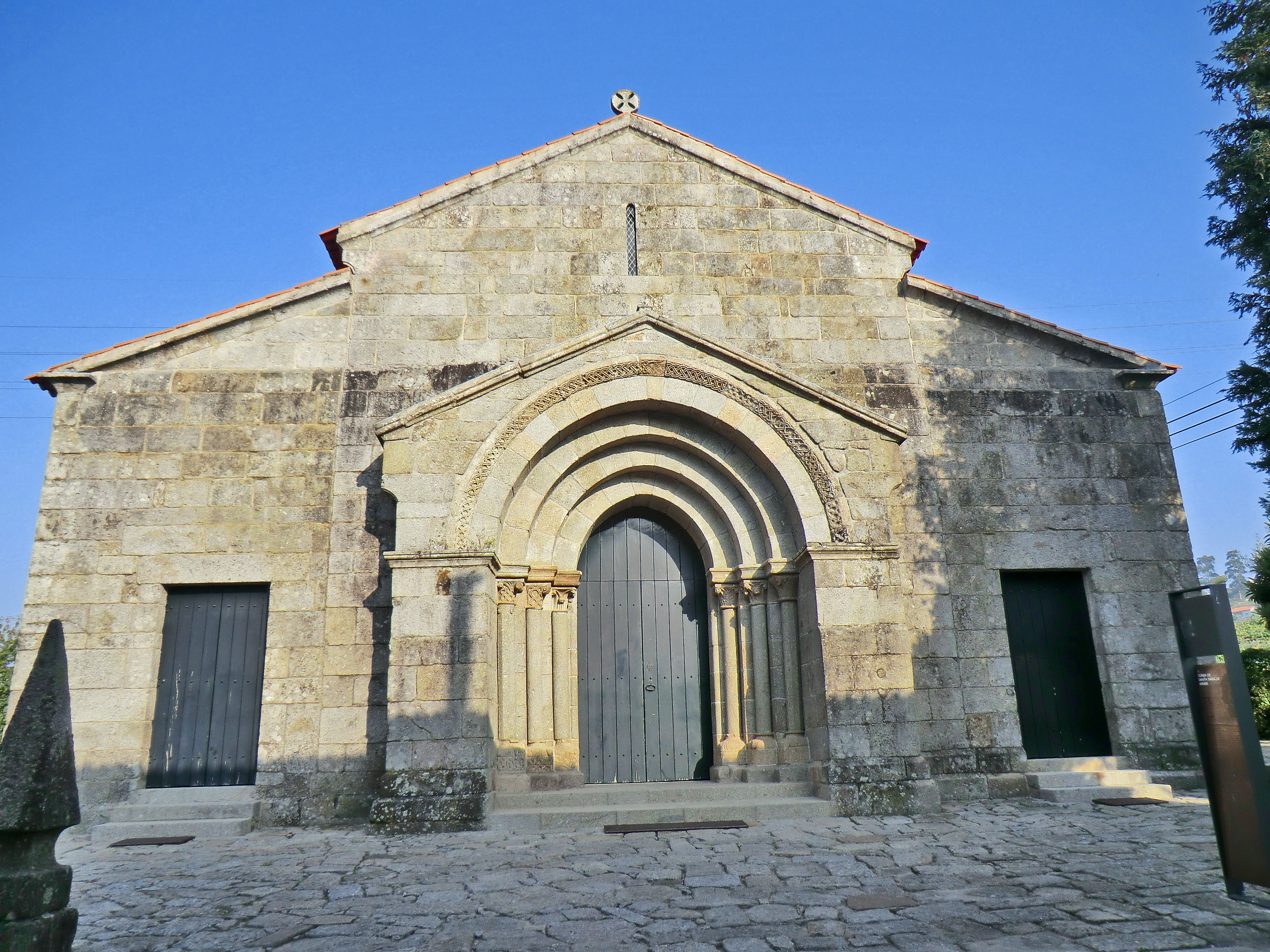
Church of Santa Maria de Airães

Igreja de Santa Maria de Airães is a church in Portugal. The current building was constructed during the late 13th or early 14th century AD; however, the site has held a church since at least the 11th century AD. It has been classified as a National Monument since 1977.
