= Igreja de Nossa Senhora da Boa Fé =

Church in Évora, Portugal

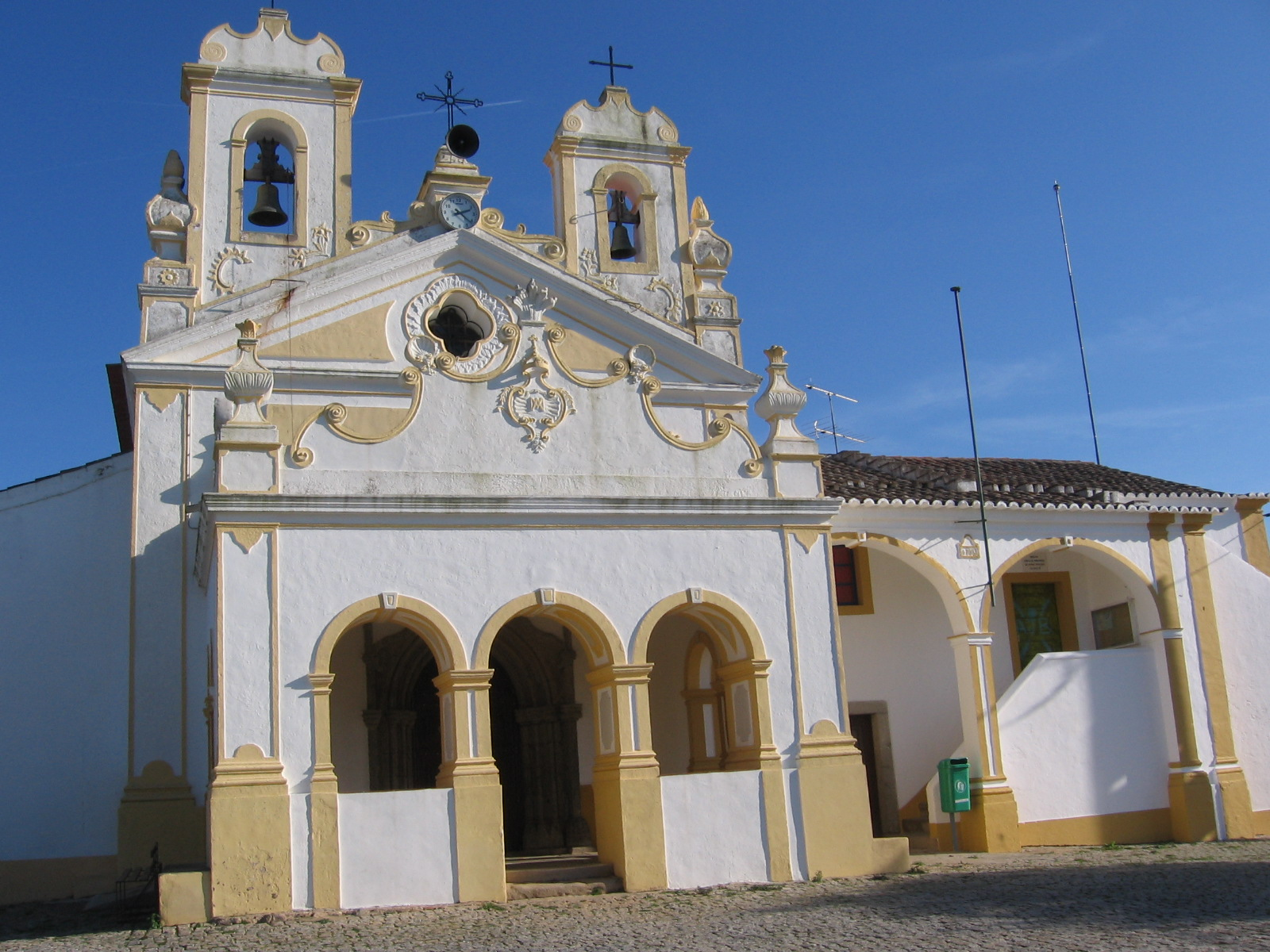

General information
- Type: church
- Location: Nossa Senhora da Boa Fé, Évora, Portugal
- Coordinates: 38°33′11″N 8°05′27″W

Design and construction
- Designations: National Monument

The Igreja de Nossa Senhora da Boa Fé is a church in Nossa Senhora da Boa Fé, Évora, Portugal. It is classified as a National Monument.
