= Igreja de Nossa Senhora da Conceição (Ermida do Paiva) =

Church in Castro Daire Municipality, Viseu District, Portugal

Coordinates: 40°55′20″N 7°58′12″W

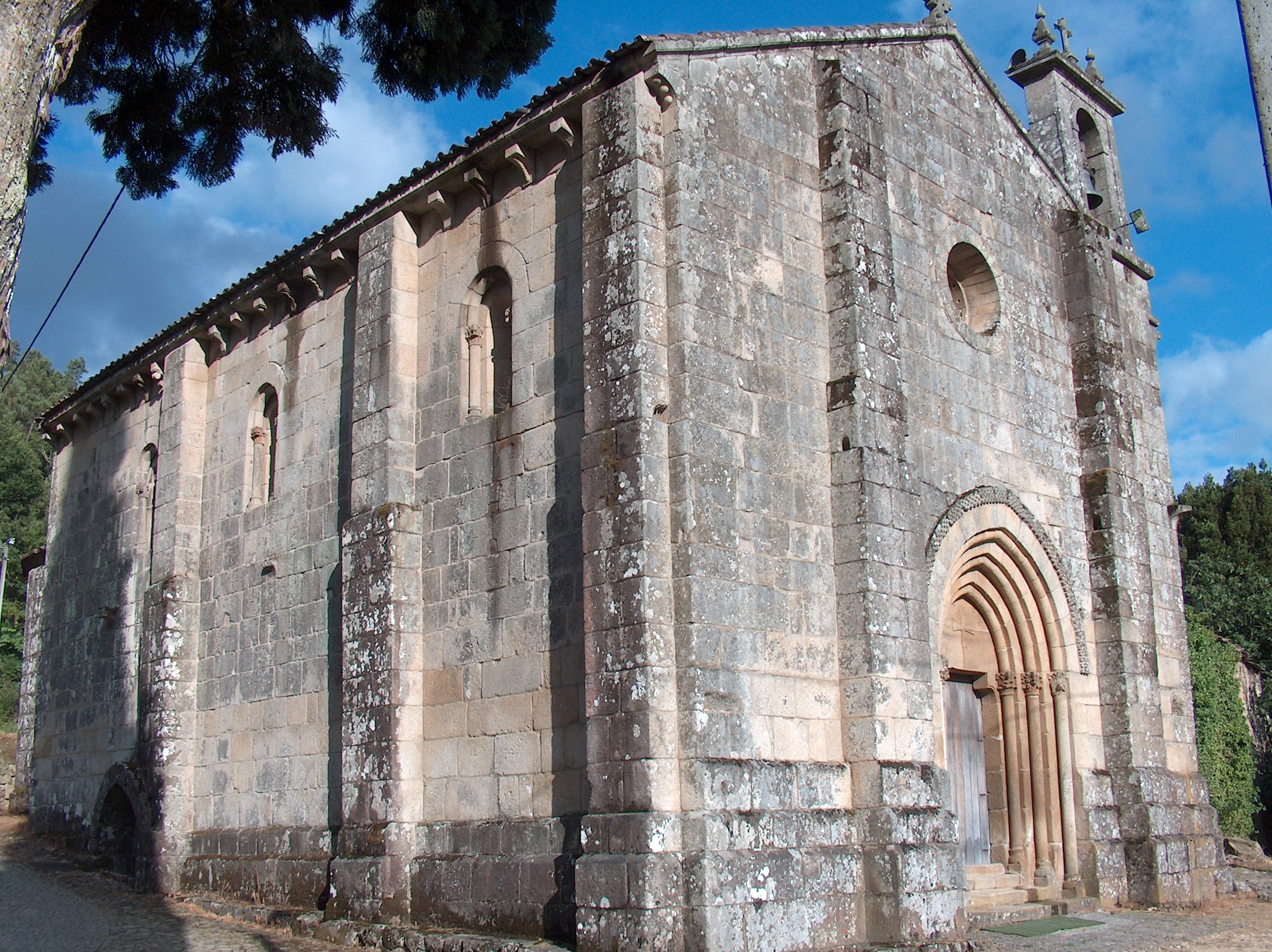

Igreja de Nossa Senhora da Conceição is a church in Portugal. It is classified as a National Monument.
