= Igreja de São Tiago (Évora) =

Church in Évora, Portugal

Coordinates: 38.5719865°N 7.9090631°W

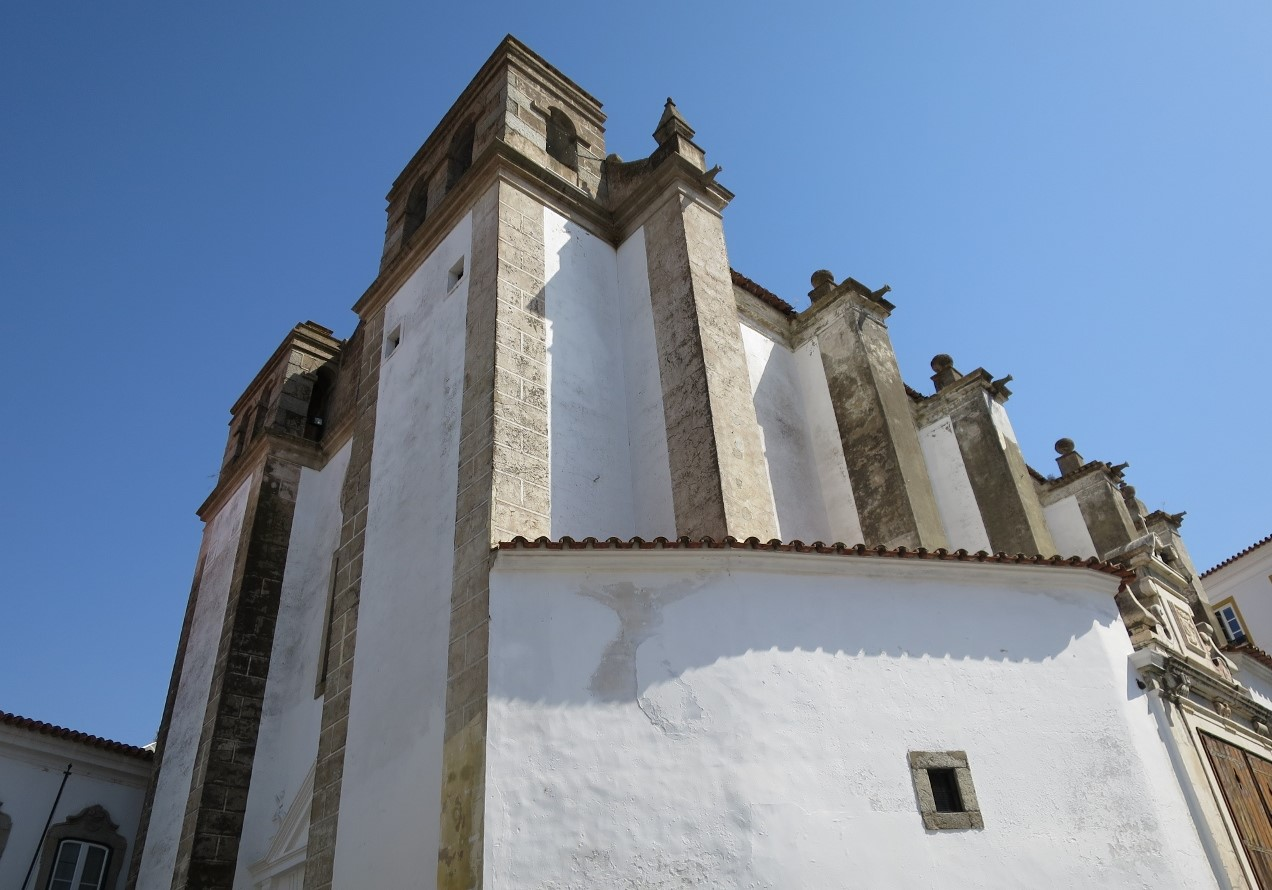
Vista geral da Igreja de São Tiago.jpg

Igreja de São Tiago is a church in Portugal. It is classified as a National Monument.
