= Igreja Matriz de Vila do Conde =

Church in Portugal

Coordinates: 41°21′14″N 8°44′33″W

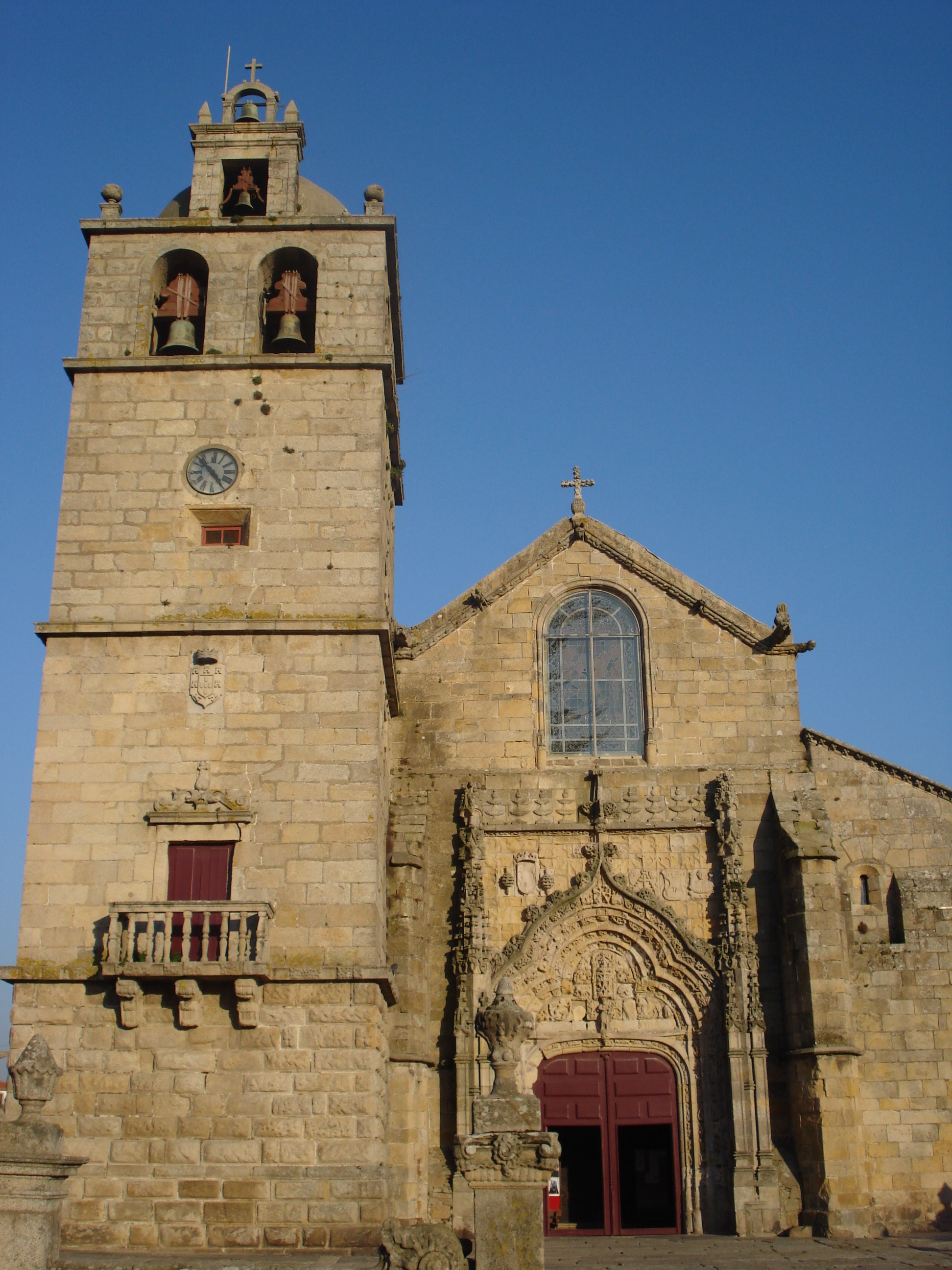
Igreja Matriz de Vila do Conde

Igreja Matriz de Vila do Conde is a church in Portugal. It is classified as a National Monument.
