= Igreja Matriz de Viana do Alentejo =

Church in Viana do Alentejo, Portugal

Coordinates: 38°19′55″N 8°00′06″W

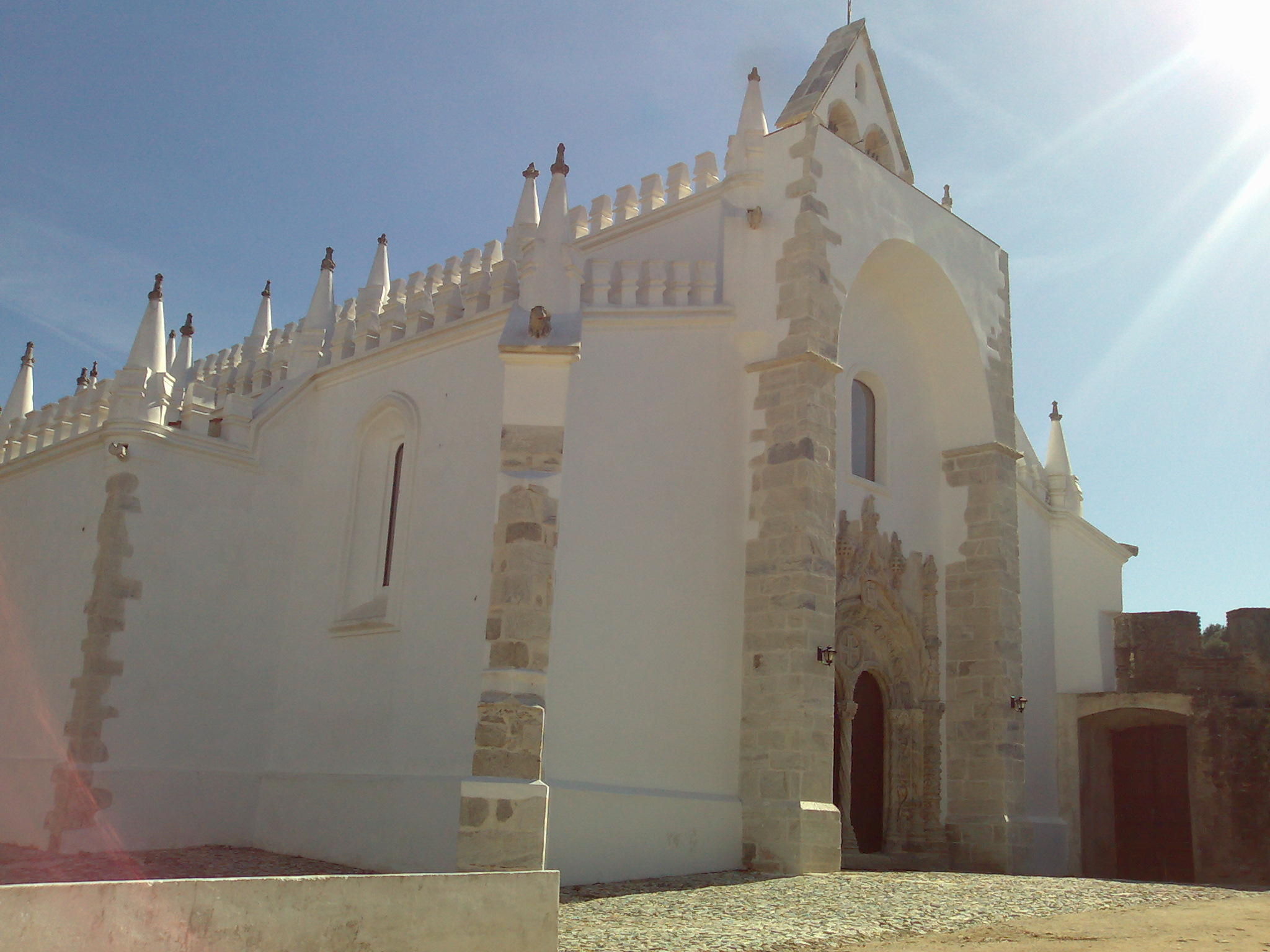
Igreja Matriz de Viana do Alentejo

Igreja Matriz de Viana do Alentejo is a church in Portugal. It is classified as a National Monument.
