= Church of Saint Nicholas, Santarém =

Church in Santarém, Portugal

Coordinates: 39.2347414°N 8.6866075°W

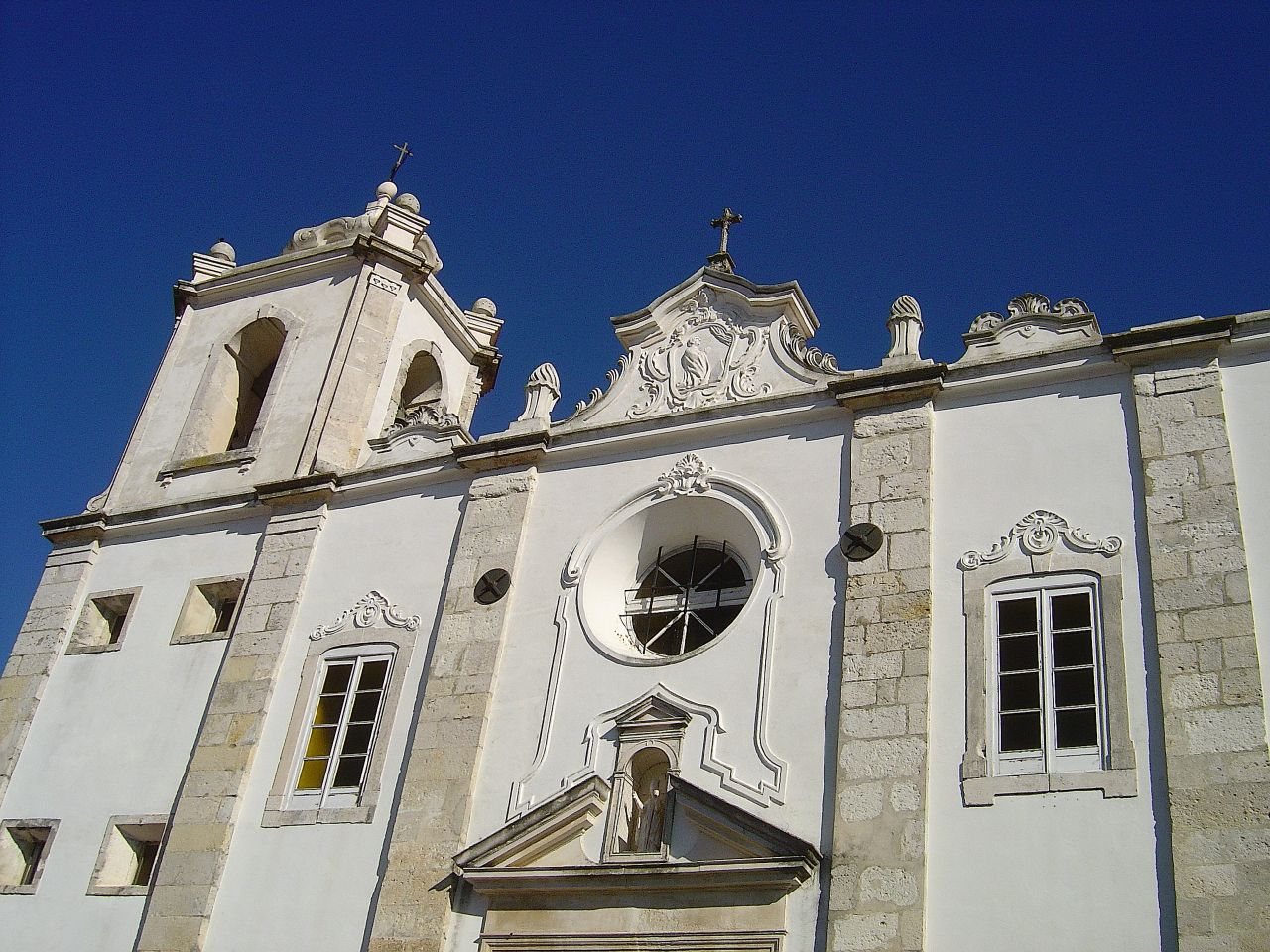
Church of São Nicolau, Santarém

Igreja de São Nicolau is a church in Portugal. It is classified as a National Monument.

In 2023, a wall of the church was damaged in a fire.
