= Igreja de São Romão de Arões =

Church, National Monument of Portugal

Coordinates: 41°27′22″N 8°13′02″W

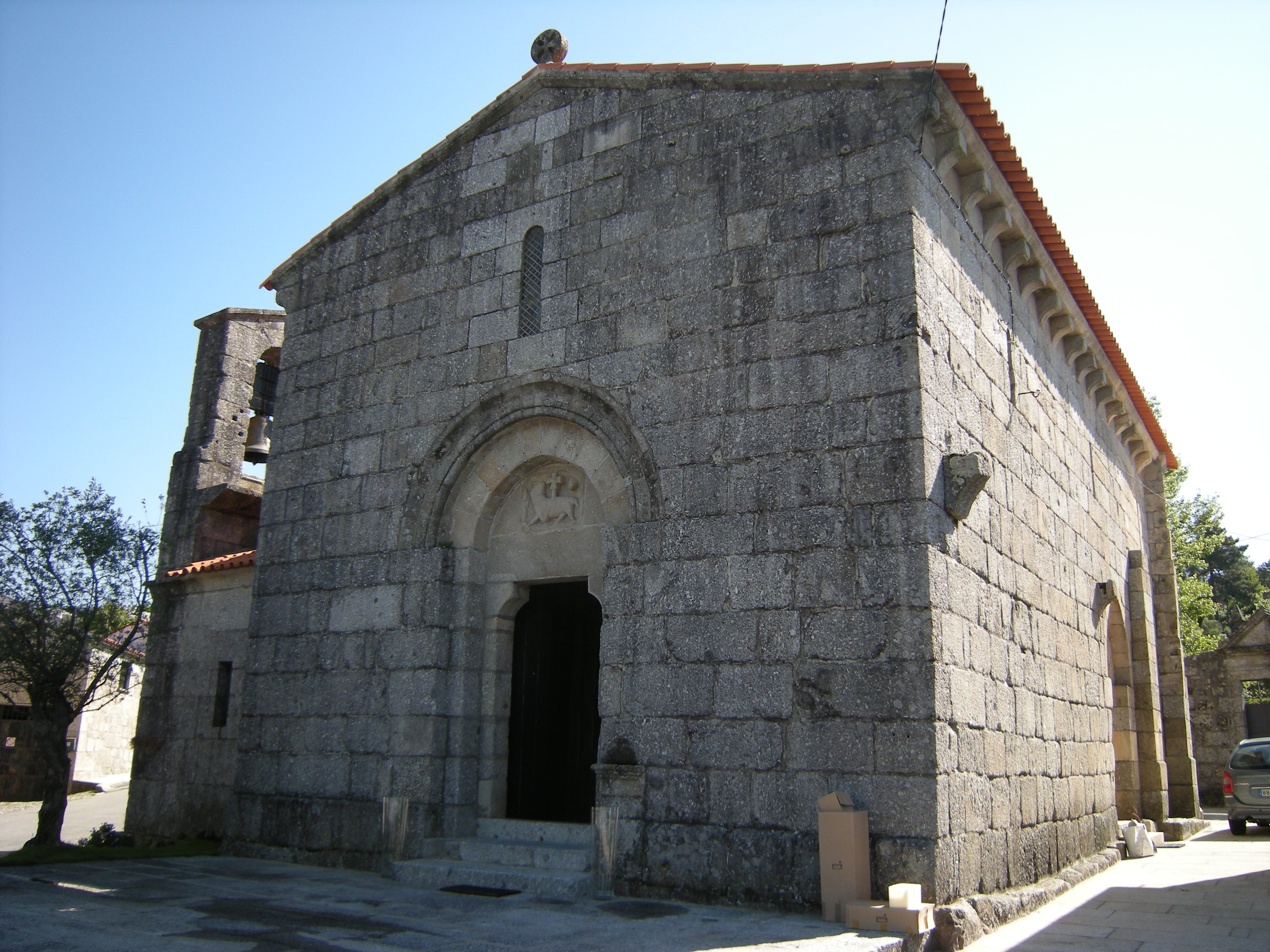
Church of São Romão de Arões

Igreja de São Romão de Arões is a church in Portugal. It is classified as a National monuments of Portugal.
