= Igreja Matriz de São Martinho de Candoso =

Church in Guimarãeses, Portugal

Coordinates: 41°25′34″N 8°20′07″W

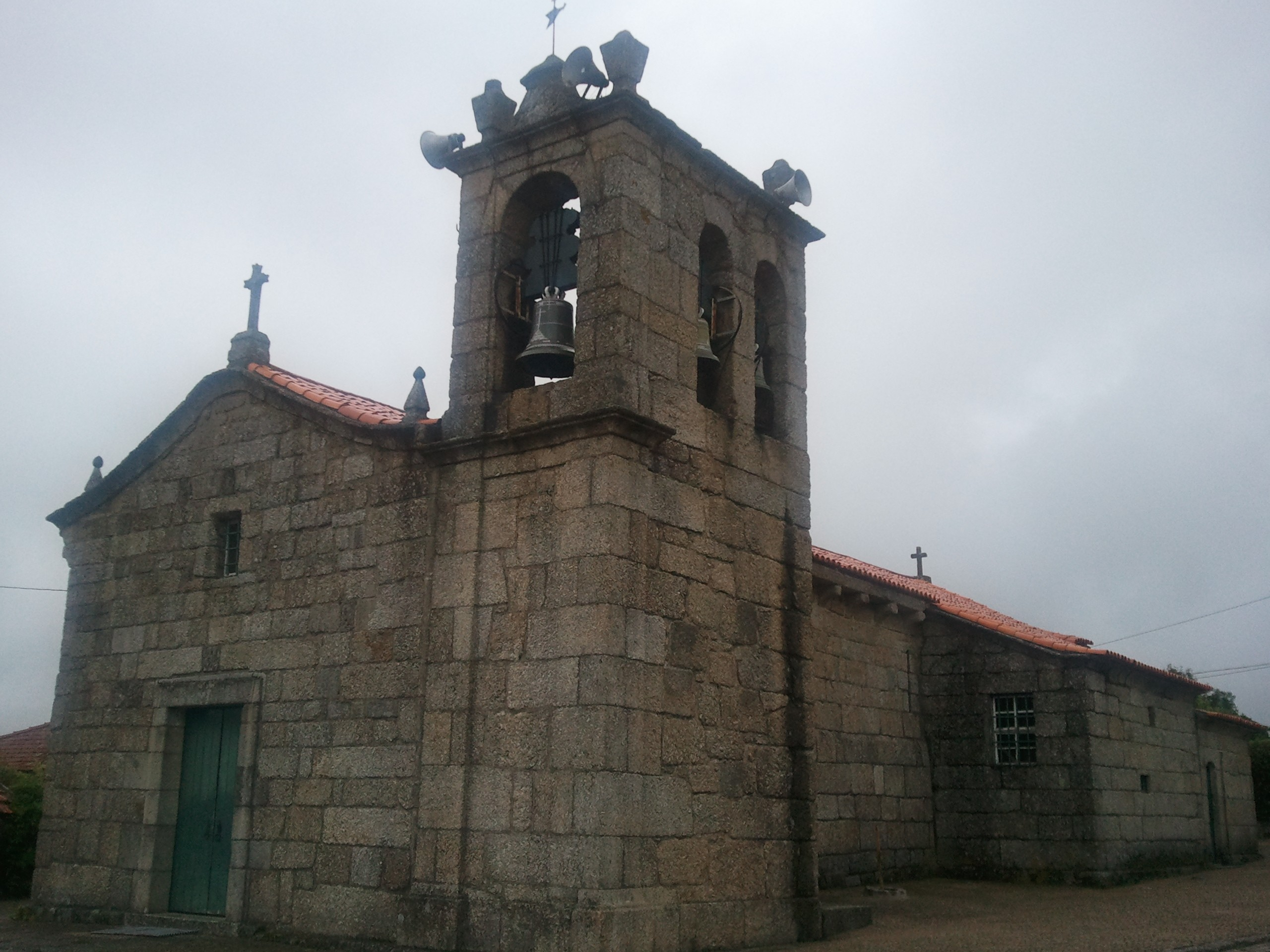
Igreja Matriz de São Martinho de Candoso

Igreja Matriz de São Martinho de Candoso is a church in Portugal. It is classified as a National Monument.
