= Igreja de Nossa Senhora da Conceição (Santa Maria da Feira) =

Church in Beja District, Portugal

Coordinates: 38°00′50″N 7°51′46″W

Igreja de Nossa Senhora da Conceição is a church in Portugal. It is classified as a National Monument.
