= Igreja da Póvoa de Santo Adrião =

Church in Lisbon District, Portugal

Coordinates: 38.800379°N 9.159763°W

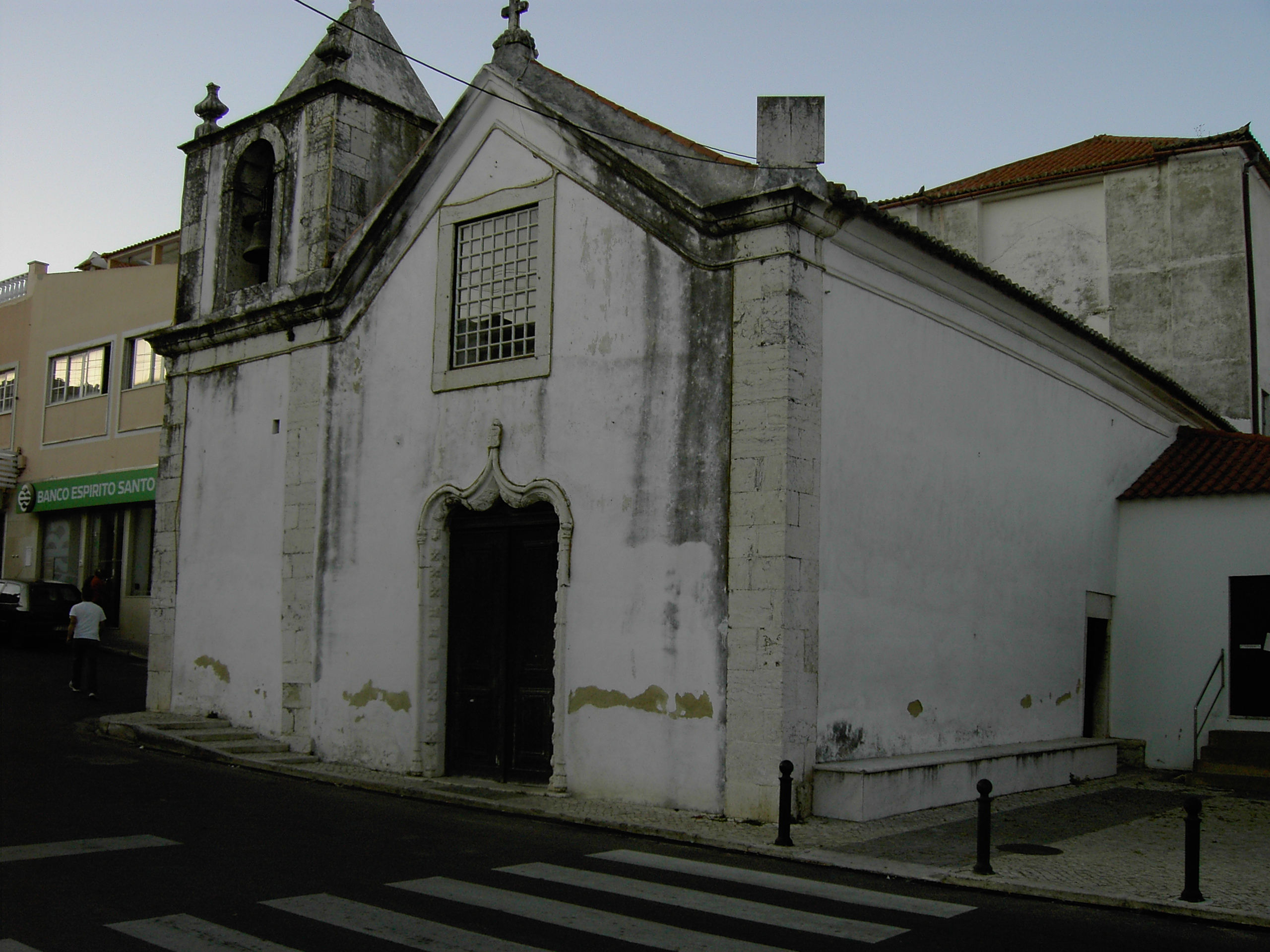
Igreja da Póvoa de Santo Adrião

Igreja da Póvoa de Santo Adrião is a church in Portugal. It is classified as a National Monument.
