= Capela do Corpo Santo =

15th c. chapel in Funchal, Portugal

Coordinates: 32°38′51.5″N 16°54′0″W

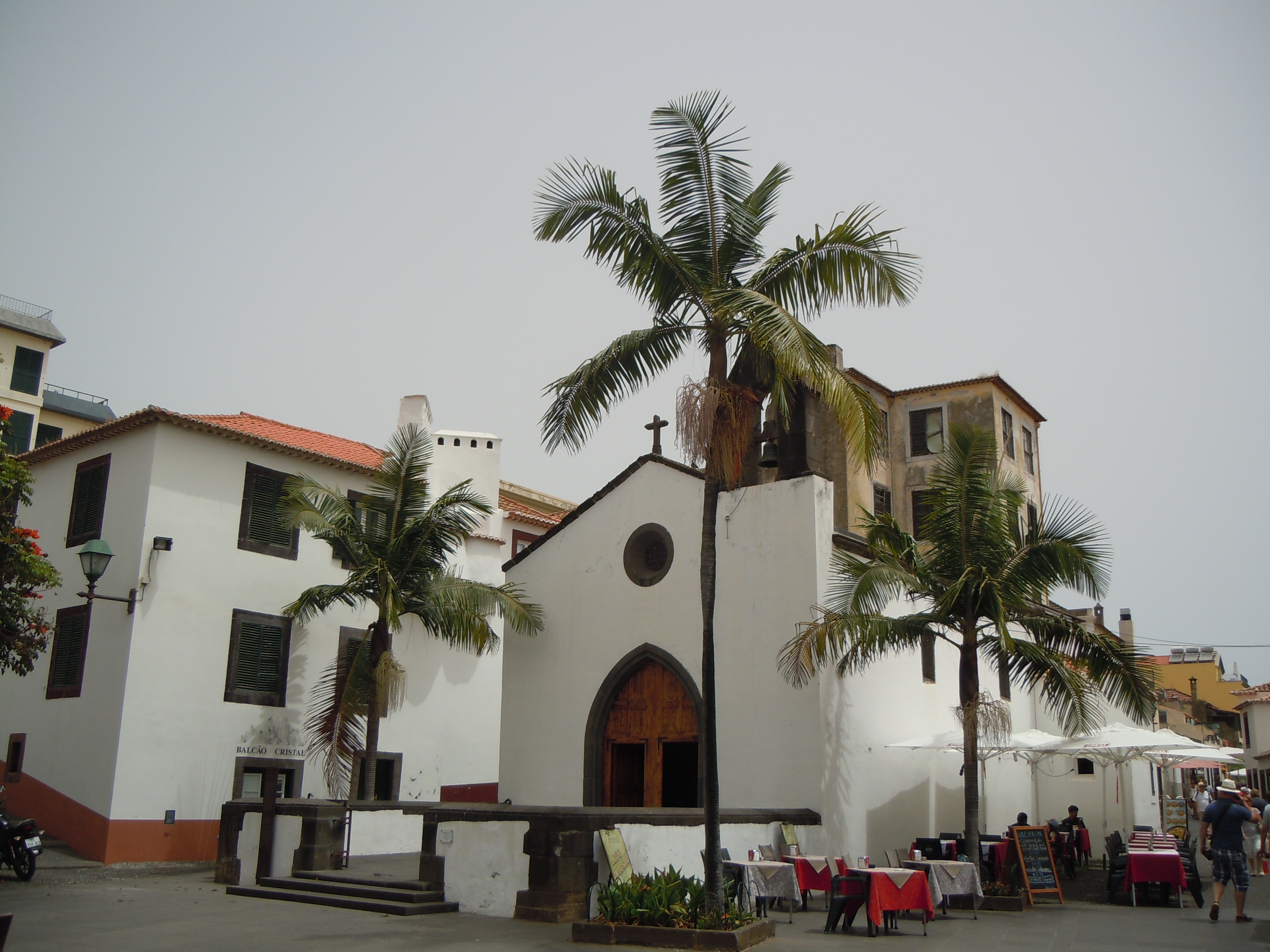

The Capela do Corpo Santo or Chapel of Corpo Santo is a 15th century chapel at the end of the old village of Funchal (Rua D. Carlos I 64, 9060-051 Funchal, Portugal). It is dedicated to the patron saint of fishermen, Saint Pedro Gonçalves Telmo, the "Corpo Santo".

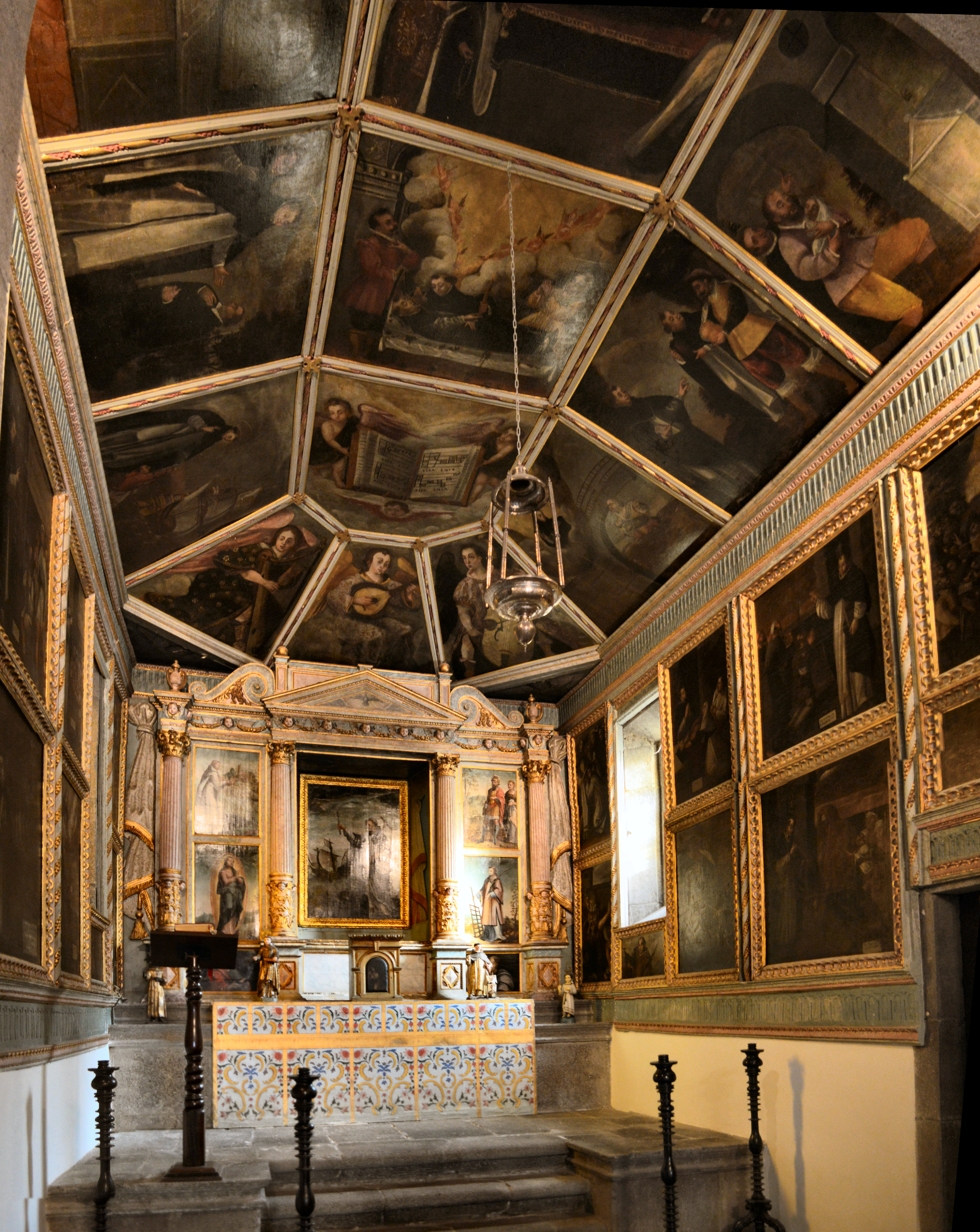
Capela do Corpo Santo, sanctuary

It is decorated with ceiling paintings, gilded carved wood altars, and sculptures in the Manueline style. It has a gabled façade and the Gothic doorway is all that remains of the original chapel. Major changes were made in the 16th century when the altar was remodelled and window-slits added. Some of the aisle altar paintings date from this period and are attributed to the royal painter Fernao Gomes. The main altar paintings are probably from another paint workshop and have the dates 1615 and 1616 inscribed in the musician angels and the scenes of the Patron Saint's life.

The chapel was the centre of an important confraternity, serving as an infirmary for local fishermen and their families, providing humanitarian aid, loaning money and helping the membership's widows.
