= Church of Saint Fins of Friestas =

Church in Valença, Portugal

Coordinates: 42°01′53″N 8°34′56″W

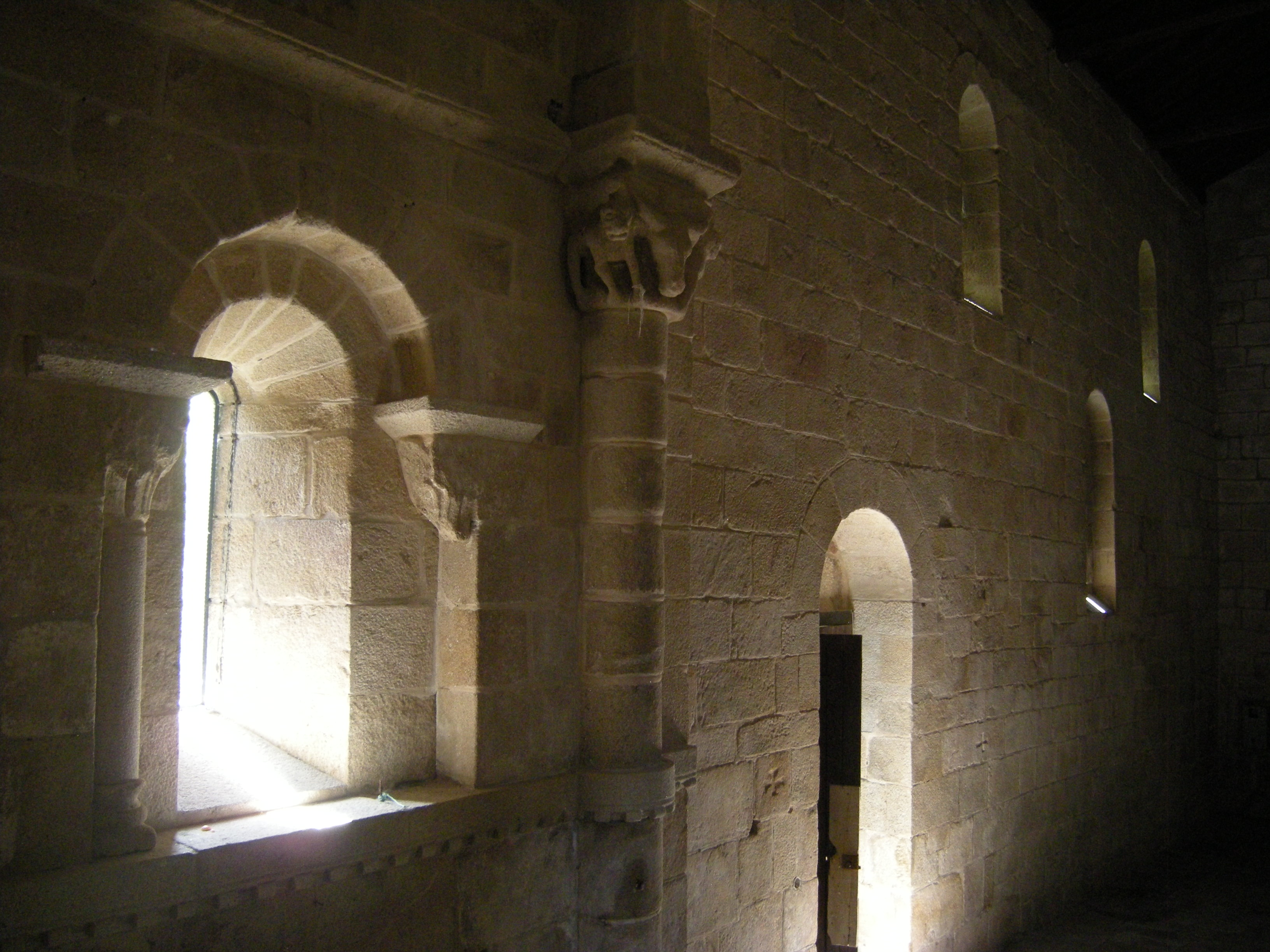
Church of Saint Fins of Friestas

Church of Saint Fins of Friestas (Igreja de São Fins de Friestas) is a church "located in Trofa de Cima, in the parish of Friestas, in the Alto Minho municipality of Valença, Portugal and in a predominantly rural setting" on a hill. It is classified as a National Monument and also known as the Monastery of São Fins de Friestas.

It is a significant example of Romanesque architecture in Portugal, with a single nave, that dates

from the 12th century and was part of a monastery of the Benedictine Order (or, according to researcher Manuel Luís Real, of the Canons Regular of St. Augustine)".

and

has been a national monument since 1910. The monastery was the site of the former Monastery of Couto de Sanfins until 1834.It has eceived several royal charters. ... and some buildings dating back to AD 604.

The Church has a many carvings on its exterior, especially in the apse: "a rich variety of corbels and capitals carved with phytomorphic (plant) and zoomorphic (animal) motifs" that include the Galician ox; there are also "intertwined serpents and geometric ornaments, symbols "to ward off evil".

== See also ==
Portuguese Romanesque architecture
