= Igreja de Longos Vales =

Church in Monção, Portugal

Coordinates: 42.0511196°N 8.4443423°W

Igreja de Longos Vales is a church in Portugal. It is classified as a National Monument.
