= Igreja Matriz de Santa Marinha de Trevões =

Church in São João da Pesqueira Municipality, Portugal

Coordinates: 41.0819°N 7.4357°W

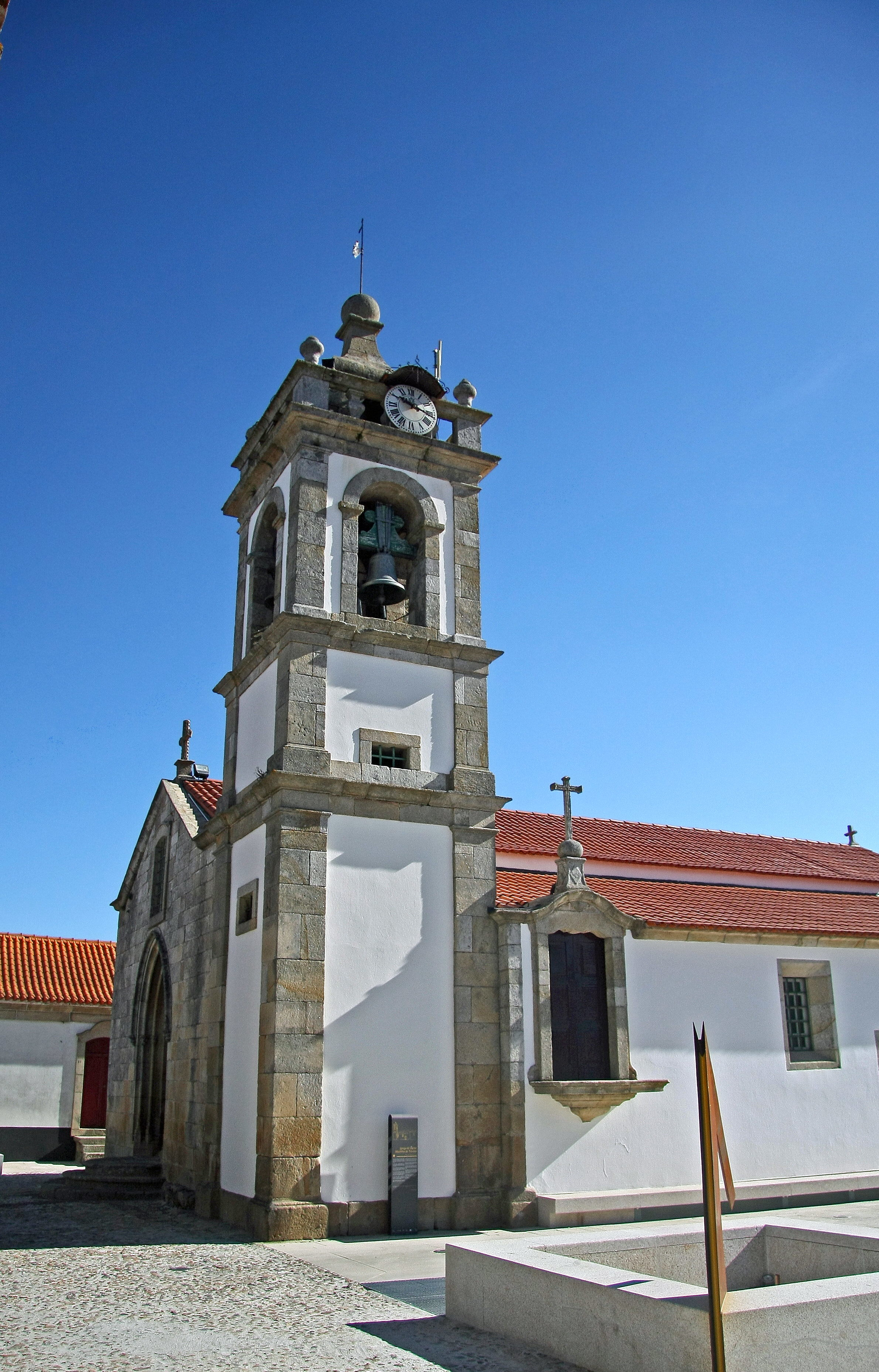
Igreja Matriz de Trevões

Igreja Matriz de Santa Marinha de Trevões is a church in Portugal. It is classified as a National Monument.
