= Basílica Real de Castro Verde =

- Igreja Matriz de Castro Verde
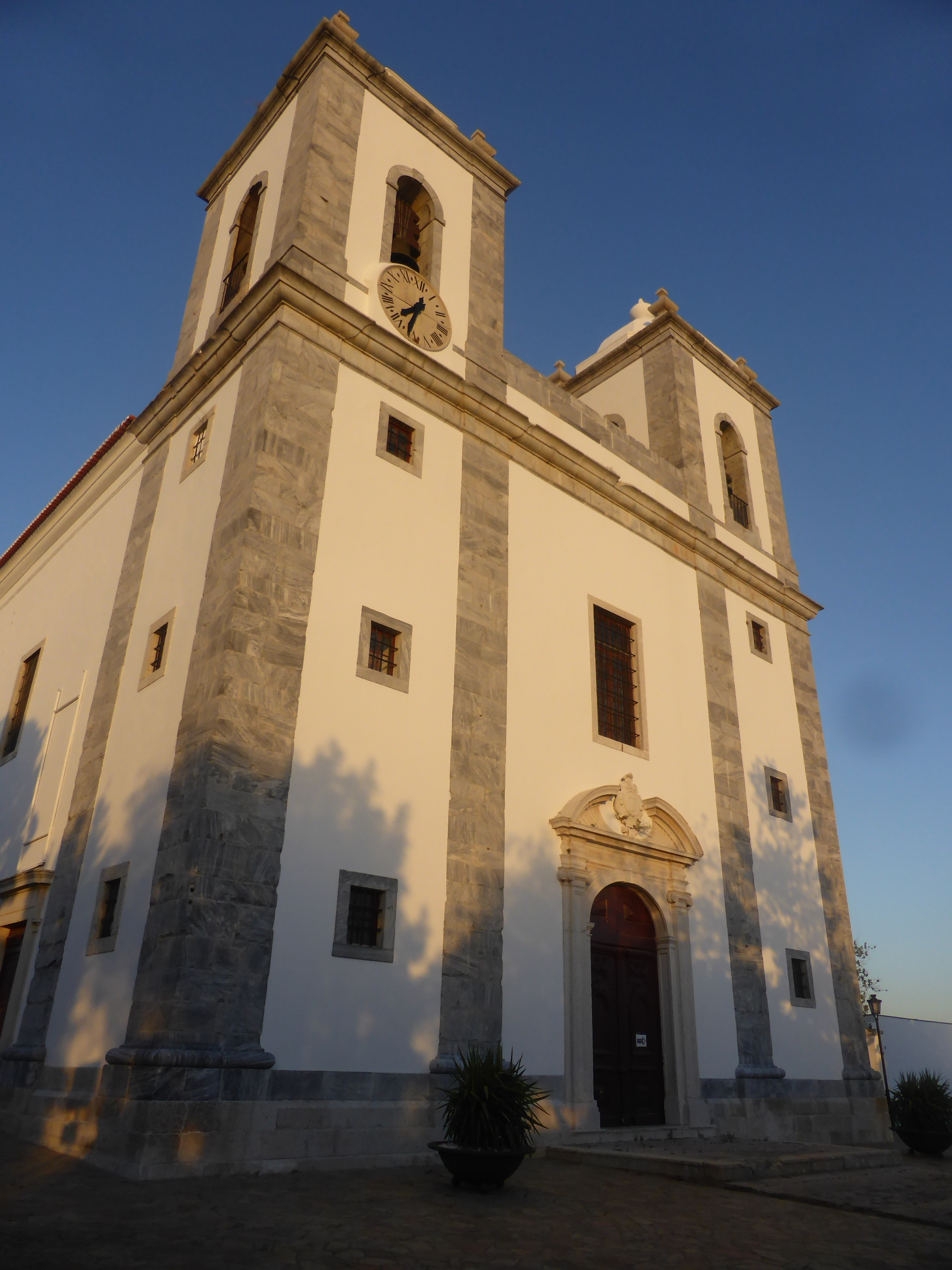
- The Royal Basilica in September 2020, after the restoration works started in 2019.

- Location of the church within the municipality of Castro Verde
- 37°41′52.12″N 8°4′54.89″W
- Location: Castro Verde
- Country: Portugal

Basilica Real de Castro Verde (English:Royal Basilica of Castro Verde/Church of Nossa Senhora da Conceição) (also known as Igreja Matriz de Castro Verde) is a basilica located in the parish and village of Castro Verde, Portugal.

== History ==
The basilica was built in the 16th century, in honor of the Battle of Ourique. It replaced an earlier church, probably built during the 15th century. It was rebuilt in the 18th century, and in 2019 a major restoration program began. The building of basilica includes a museum, the Treasury of the Royal Basilica, where several sacred pieces of the municipality are exhibited. It has been classified as a Monument of Public Interest (Monumento de Interesse Público) since 1993.
