= Igreja de São Vicente de Sousa =

Church in Felgueiras Municipality, Portugal

Coordinates: 41.3438116°N 8.2505986°W

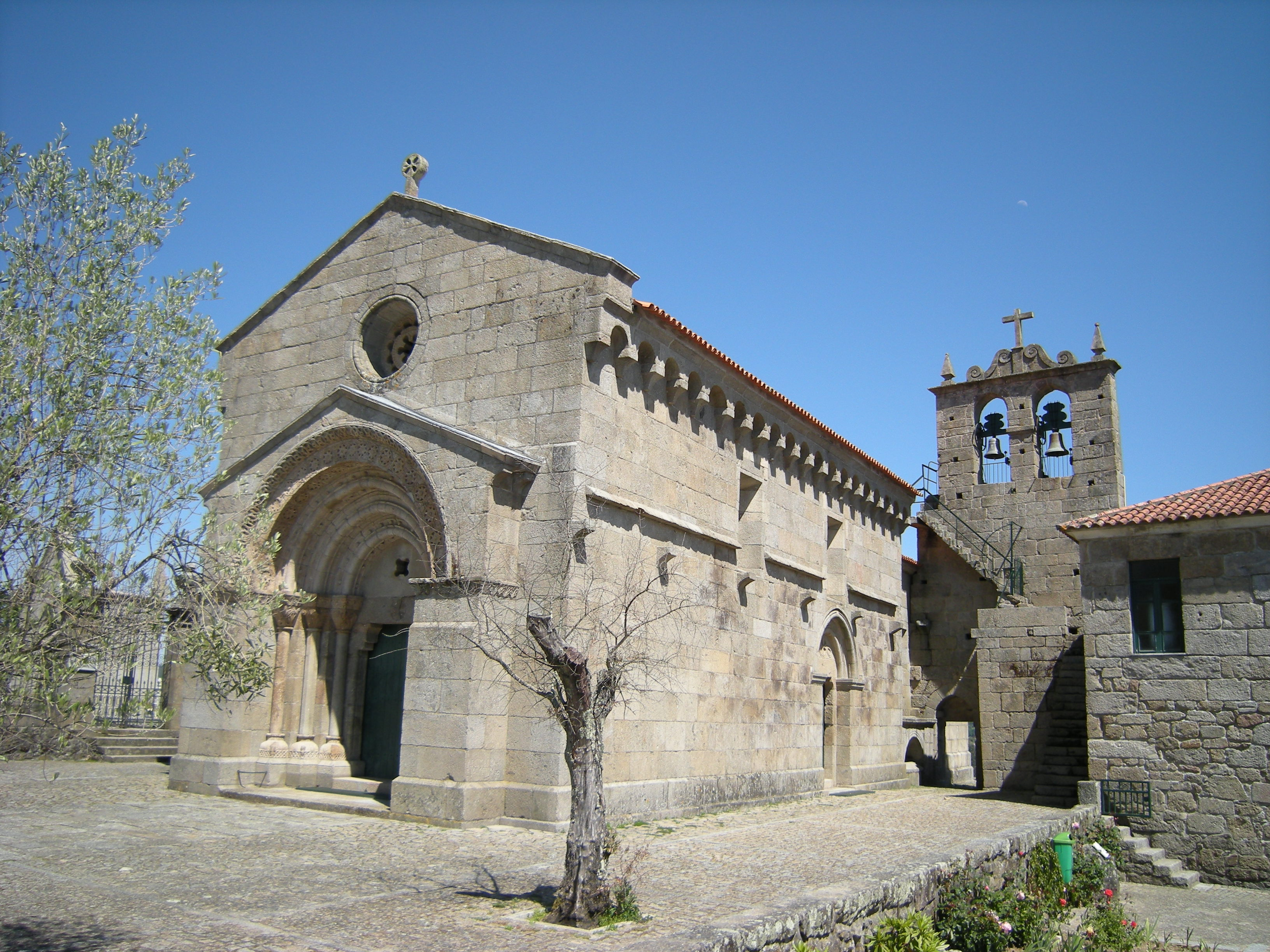

Igreja de São Vicente de Sousa is a church in Portugal. It is classified as a National Monument.
