= Igreja da Exaltação de Santa Cruz =

Church in Batalha, Portugal

Coordinates: 39.6583387°N 8.8269996°W

Igreja da Exaltação de Santa Cruz is a church in Batalha, Portugal. It is classified as a National Monument.

== Gallery ==
Main façade and north side

Manueline portal

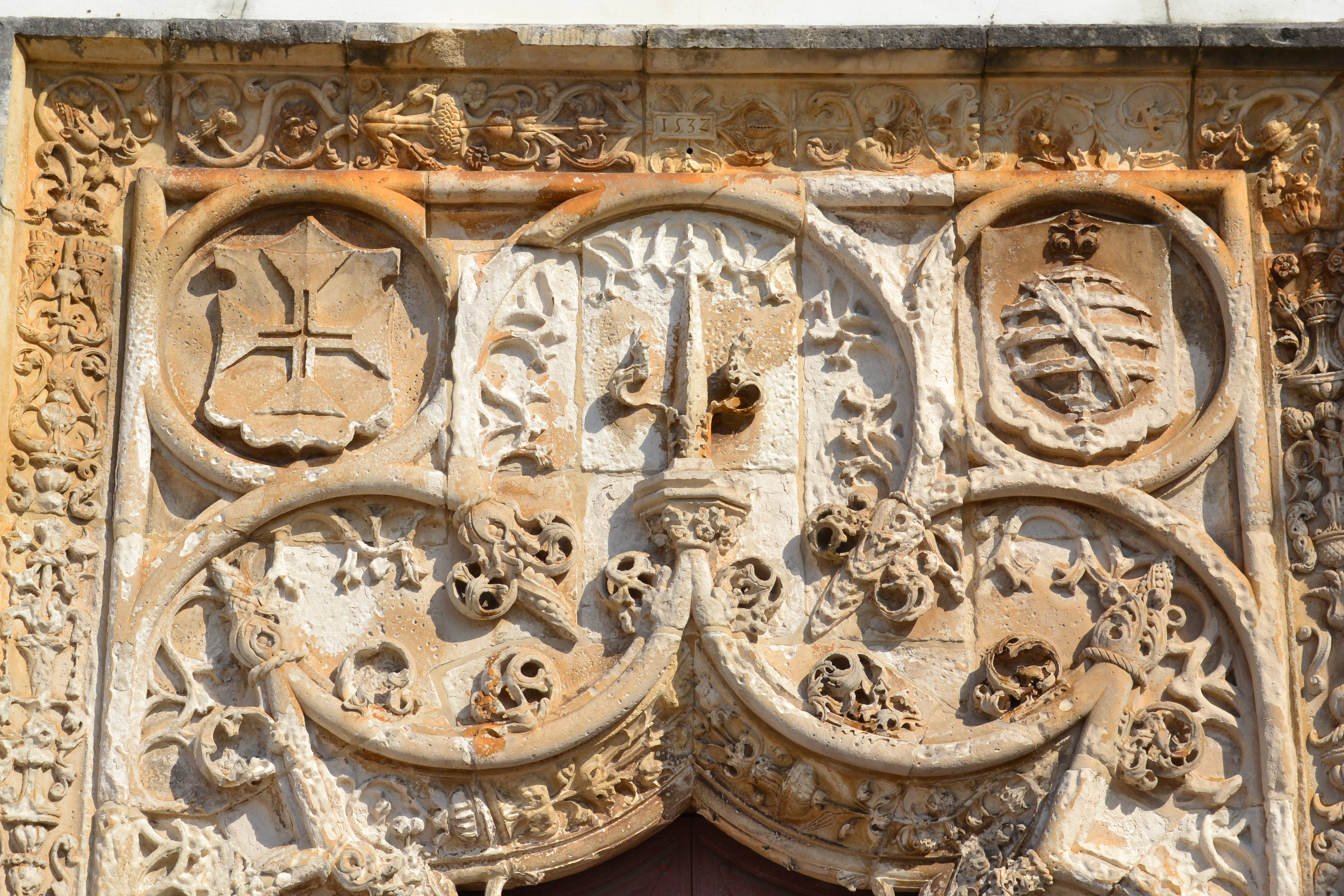
Tympanum of the portal

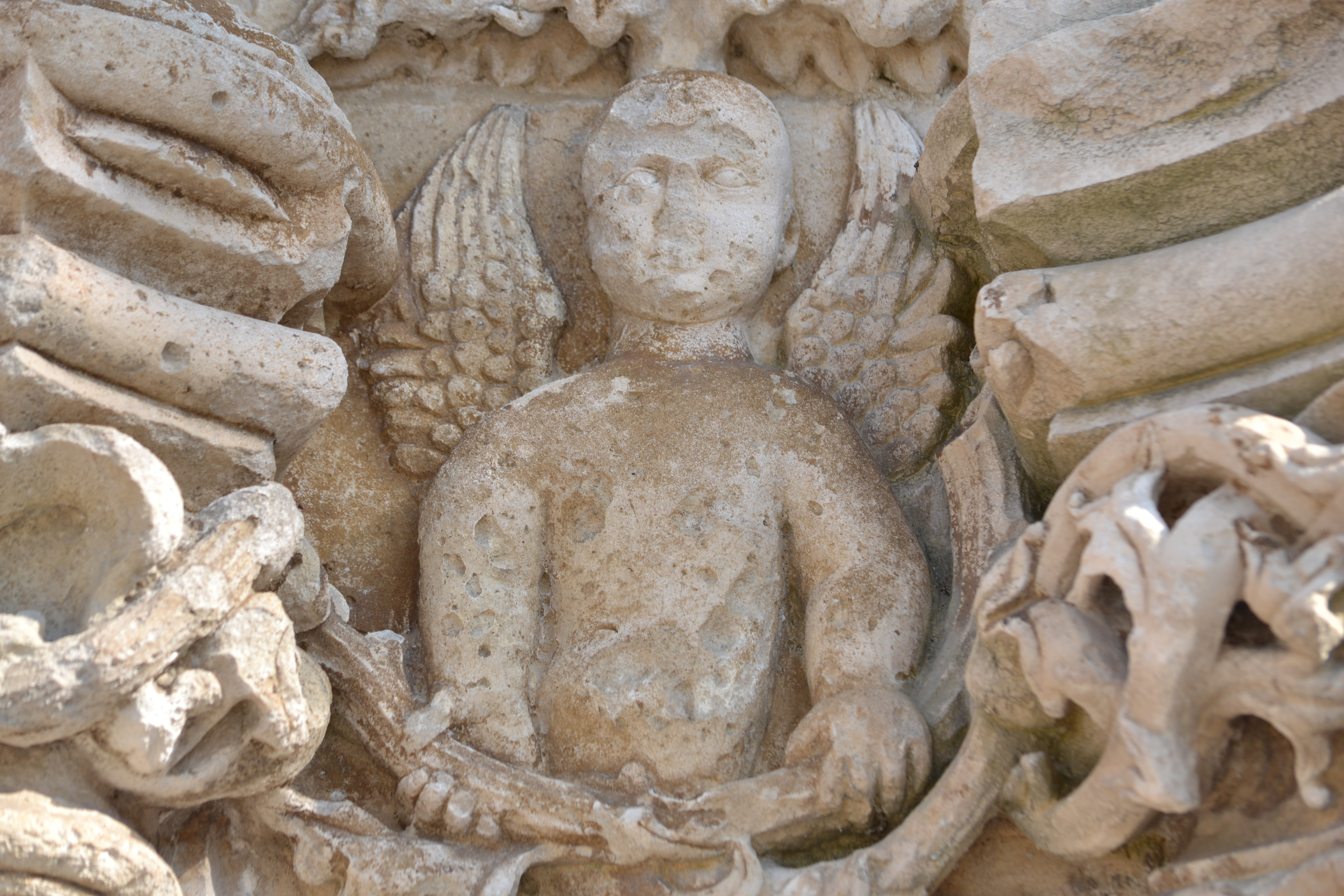
Grotesque (angel) on the portal

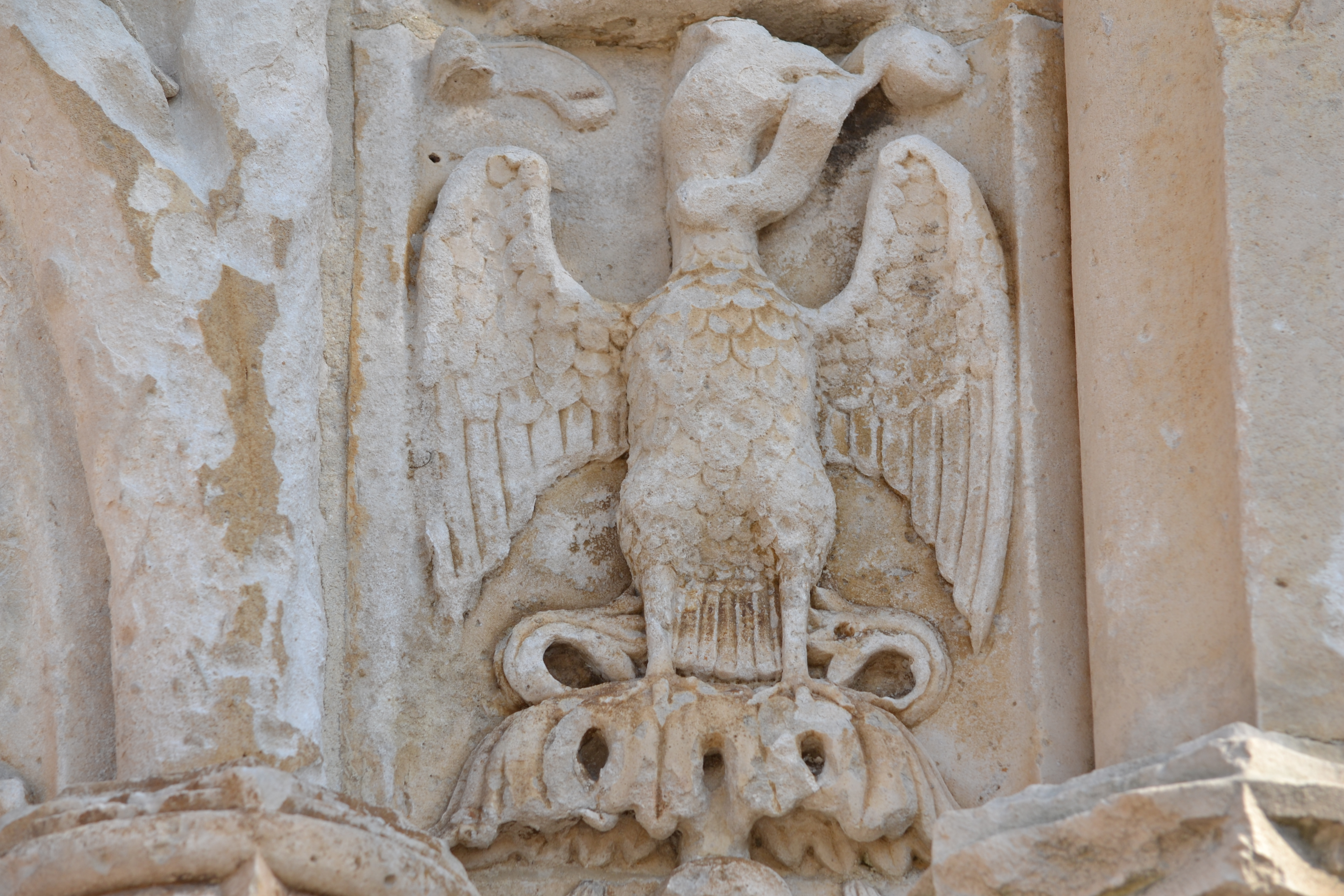
Grotesque (eagle) on the portal

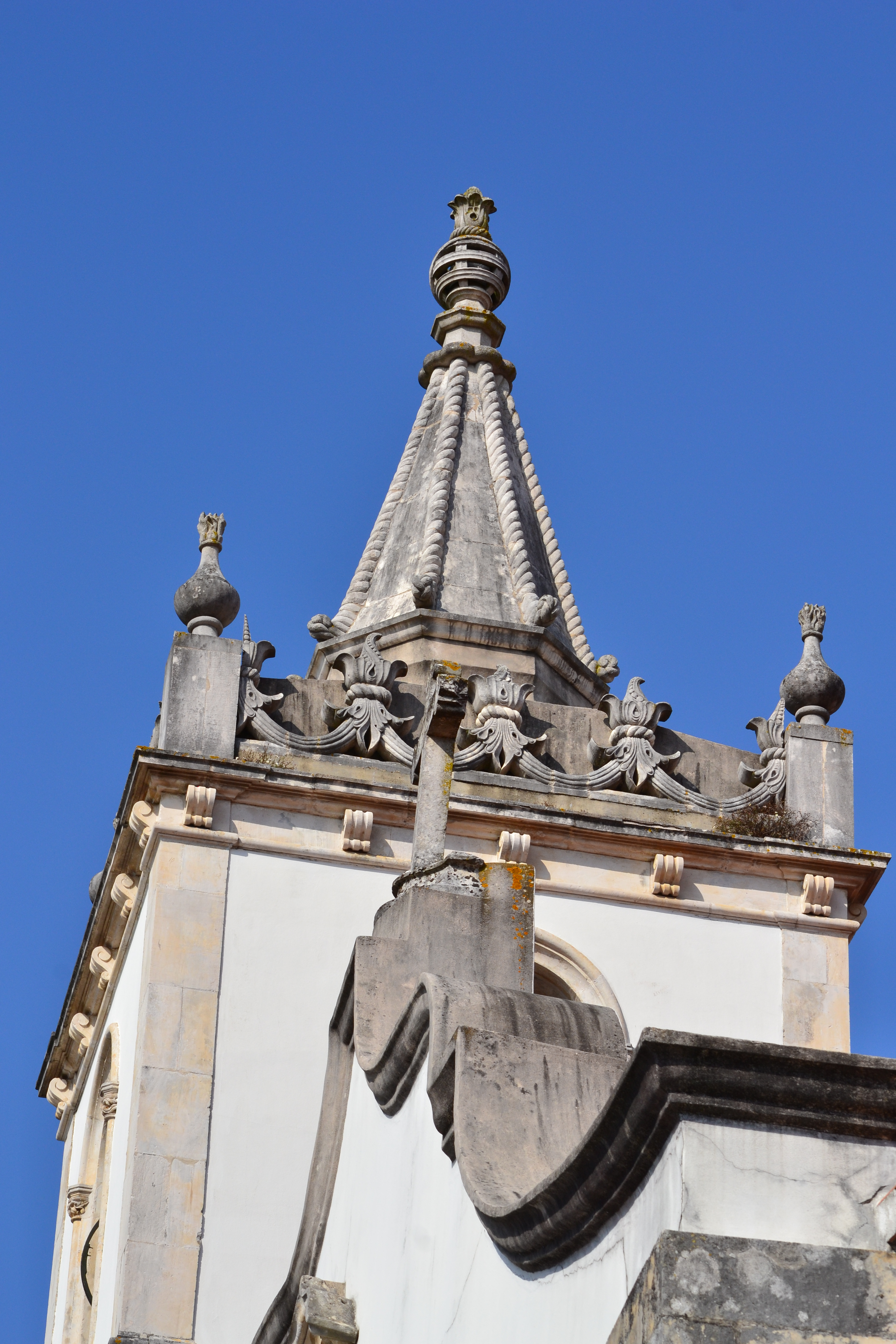
Pinnacle of the bell tower

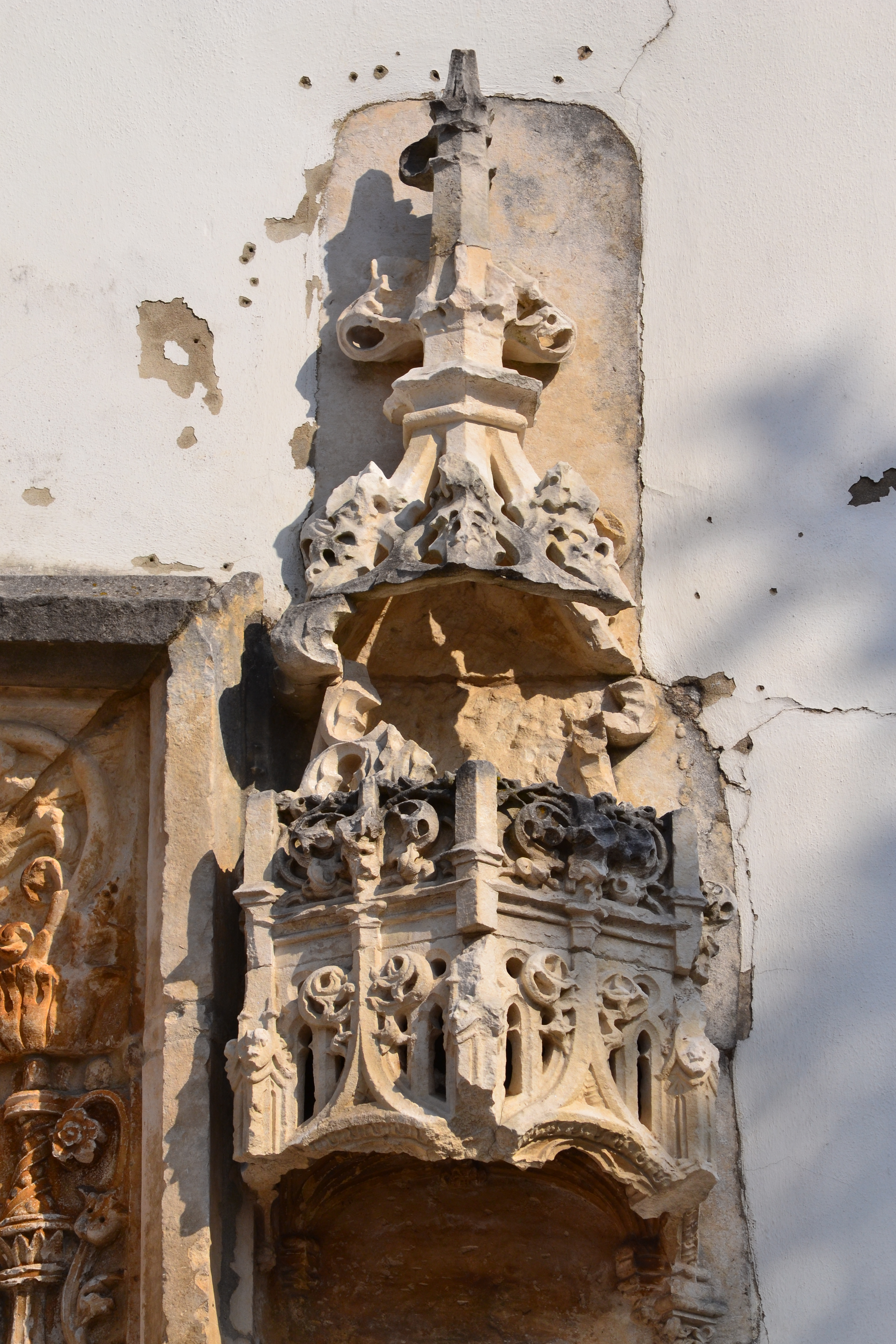
Corbel beside the portal

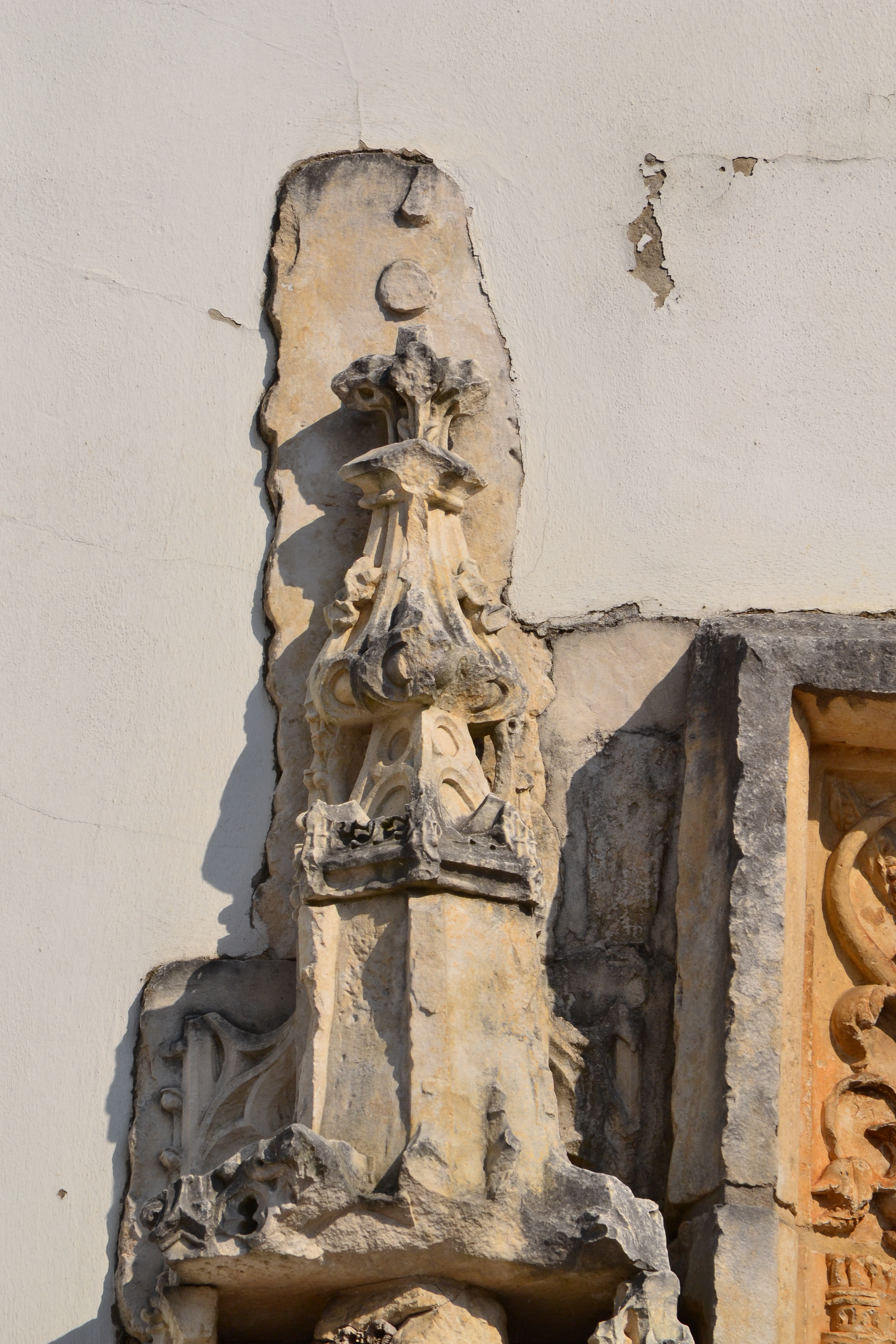
Corbel beside the portal
