= Igreja de São Pedro de Ferreira =

Church in Paços de Ferreira, Portugal

Coordinates: 41.2648411°N 8.3431933°W

Igreja de São Pedro de Ferreira is a church in Portugal. It is classified as a National Monument.

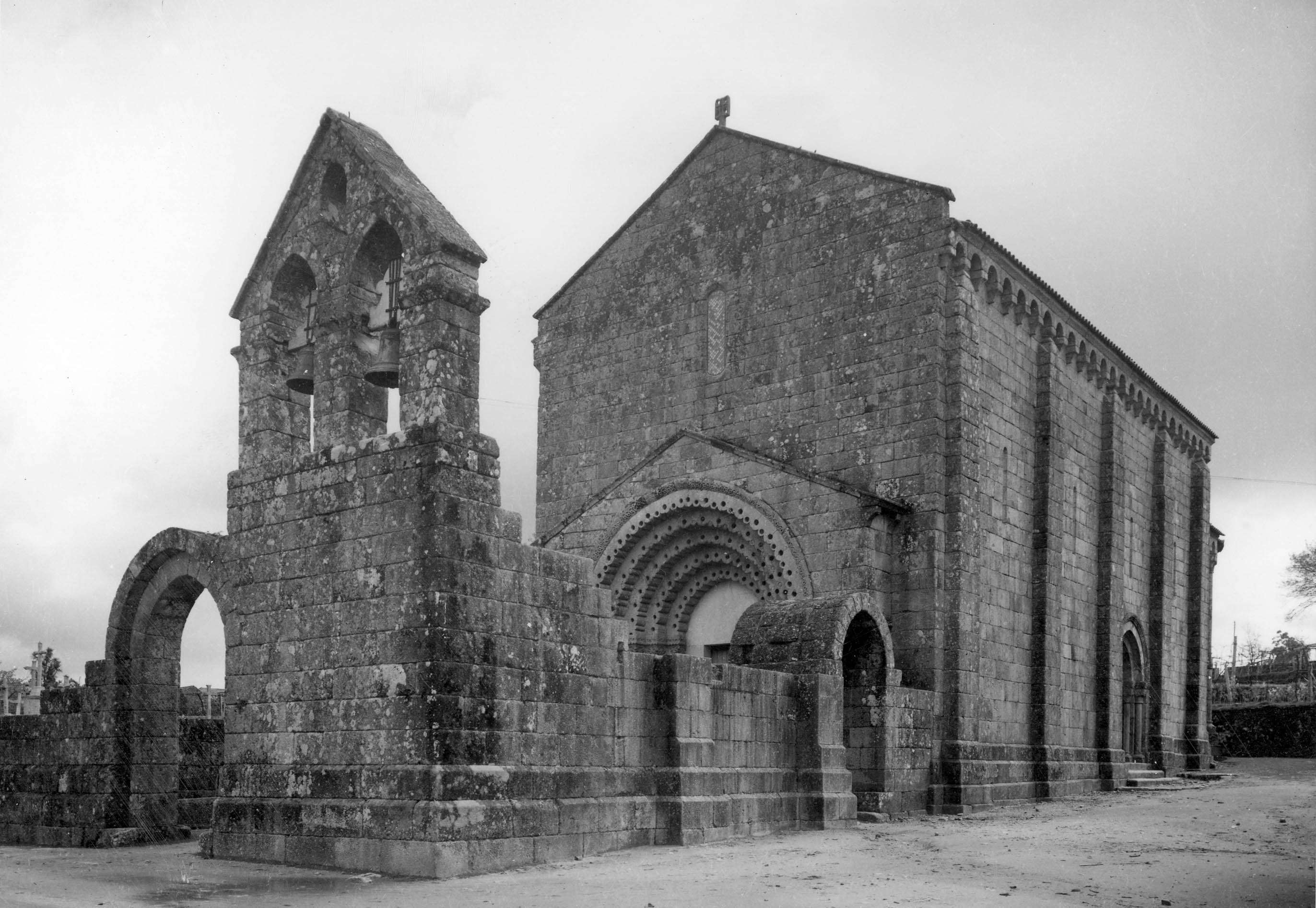
Monastery of São Pedro de Ferreira
