= Igreja de Santa Maria do Castelo (Lourinhã) =

Church in Lourinhã, Lisbon, Portugal

Coordinates: 39.2430541°N 9.317618°W

Igreja de Santa Maria do Castelo is a church in Portugal. It is classified as a National Monument.
