= List of national monuments of Portugal =

The national monuments of Portugal (Portuguese: Monumentos Nacionais) were constructed throughout the Portuguese territory, and the oldest date back to the period of pre-historic settlement of occupation. Subsequently, the region that is today Portugal has been colonized by many civilizations, which have left marks in the territory, constructing markers, defensive structures, homes and places of worship to suit their requirements and means. The formal organization of the Portuguese state resulted in a process to qualify and quantify those structures that have had an intrinsic value to the Portuguese culture. Starting with the Direcção Geral dos Edifícios e Monumentos Nacionais (DGMEN), and later by the Instituto de Gestão do Património Arquitectónico e Arqueológico (IGESPAR), the Portuguese government developed a registry of national monuments that includes a rich heritage of historical monuments throughout the country. This is a compilation of those structures that are designated as National Monuments only.

== History ==
The headquarters of IGESPAR (Institute for the Management of Architectural and Archaeological Heritage), the institute that succeeded the DEGMEN, located in a portion of the Palace of Ajuda

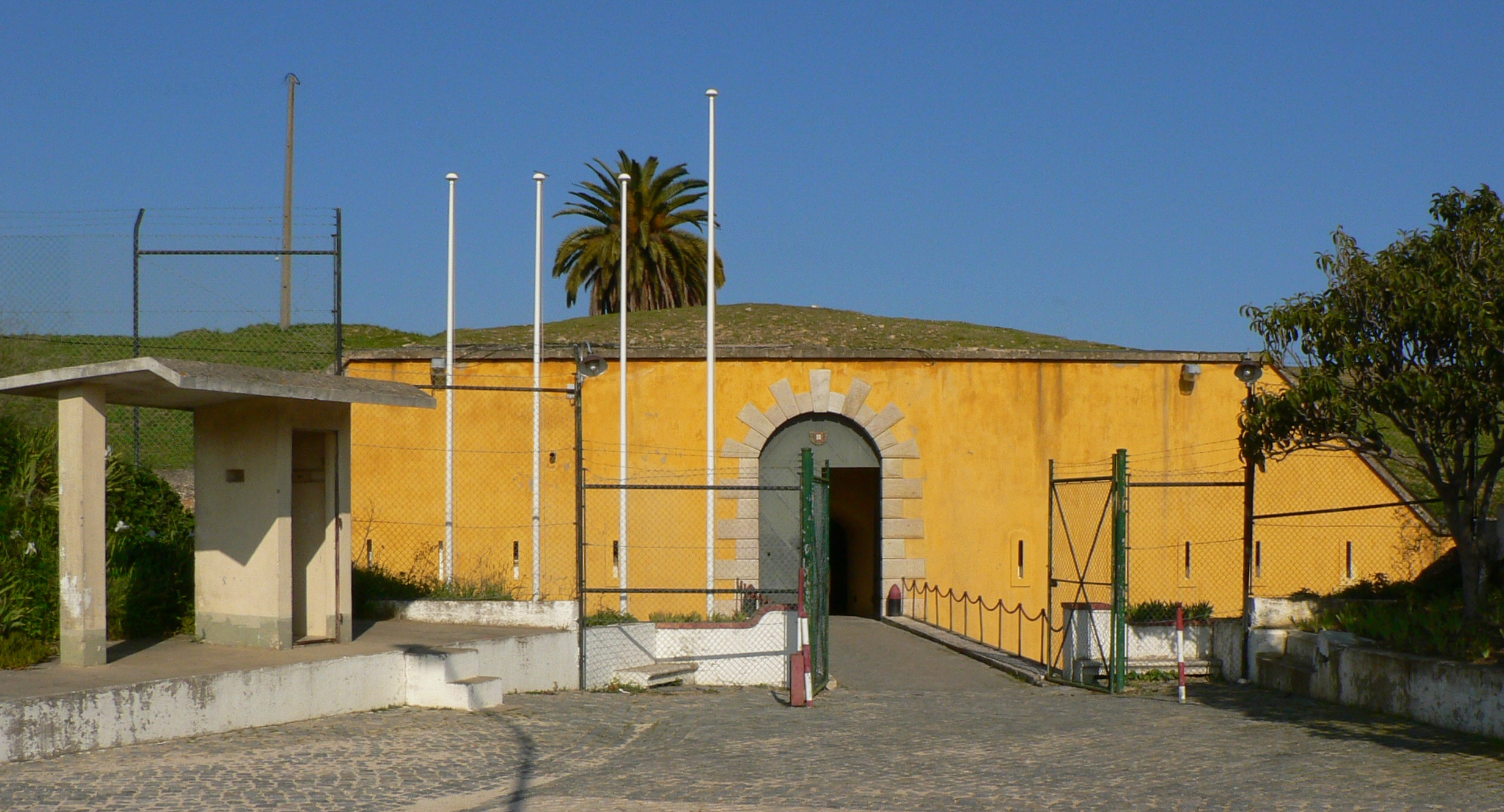
The Fort of Sacavém, the home to SIPA (Information System of Patrimonial Architecture), the database for nationally registered monuments

The first documented peoples to occupy the western coast of Iberia were the "Ostrimni" recorded in Ancient Latin poetry, whose territory stretched from Galicia (in northwestern Spain) to the Algarve (southern area of Portugal). The Greeks called the area of Portugal Ophiussa, and its inhabitants the Ophi. The serpent-worshipping Ophis are believed to have been a Celtic culture. These areas were eventually conquered, settled and assimilated by Indo-European peoples, made up of two probable invasions, the first by Proto-Celts who became the celebrated Lusitanians and the second by more developed Celts. Phoenicians also settled in trading posts along the coast and may have had contact with the assumably proto-Celtic Lusitanians, who, along with the Celtic Gallaeci, Celtici, Conii and Turduli became the base of the modern Portuguese ethnicity and culture. The Lusitanians along with the Gallaeci developed the Castro culture at the time of their invasion by the legions of Rome.

A formal organization of what would become Portugal began with the Roman occupation of the peninsula, which were responsible for re-purposing many of the castro settlements and moving the settlements from the hills to the valleys in the region. In the process, they constructed new buildings, established modern infrastructures (including internal water and baths) and a road network that connected Roman villas. Although there are many excavated ruins throughout the country, of particular importance are the Roman ruins of Conímbriga (Condeixa-a-Nova), in addition to many vestiges that encountered in the cities of Lisbon or Évora.

The disorganization in the Roman empire, which led to its fall, allowed the conquest by the Visigoths and the Christian Suevi in later years, along with other Germanic tribes. Many of the structures that survived this period include ancient churches and inscriptions built over previous constructions, which were the centre of Lusitanian settlements. Early Christian influences persisted for several centuries, until the Moors and Arab Berber peoples (from North Africa) invaded the Peninsula, including all of the territory which would eventually become Portugal. The Moors were first to construct many of the medieval castles that dot the landscapes of Portugal.

From the northern enclaves (Galicia and Asturias in Portugal's case), the Christian Reconquista began, expanding progressively south towards the southern coast of the Iberian Peninsula. This was not a permanent expansion, since the Moorish-Christian frontier continued to expand and retract for several years, with the victories and defeats of each battle.

Meanwhile, Portugal became a county of the Kingdom of León and briefly during the independence of the Kingdom of Galicia in the 1060s and 1070s. It became an autonomous dominion of the Kingdom of León in 1128, emerging as a fully independent kingdom in 1139, officially recognized by the Treaty of Zamora in 1143. After this period, and with the rise of the Portuguese state after the beginning of the Age of Discovery, Portuguese architecture expanded under the patronage of the wealthy kings, nobility, powerful clergy and through the many battles with rivals such as Castile, the French and Dutch. During these periods, many of the prominent buildings were destroyed, rebuilt, re-purposed and closed on the whims of the monarchy, which progressively used architectural projects to support their power, remember past glories or expand their position in the Iberian Peninsula.

With the demise of the powerful clergy and religious orders, and eventually the fall of the monarchy in Portugal, many of the once important buildings in the country were either reused as seats of governmental power, abandoned into ruin or reused as museum, although some remained places of public use (such as the religious places of worship). The 20th century movement to restore and preserve the architectural history of Portugal was initiated under the Direcção Geral dos Edifícios e Monumentos Nacionais (DGMEN) during the Estado Novo regime in order to inventory national treasures and preserve existing monuments.

== National monuments ==
Although there are numerous monuments from various ages some of them have a special value due to their historical, architectural, artistic and cultural importance. These monuments are classified and protected by the Instituto de Gestão do Património Arquitectónico e Arqueológico (IGESPAR) (Institute for the Management of Architectural and Archaeological Heritage), which classifies national treasures in terms of several general criteria: historic and cultural, aesthetic and social, technical and scientific, but also includes issues of integrity, authenticity and exemplary importance.

Owing to its relative value and importance, the cultural property may be listed as or national, public or municipal interest. In addition, these definitions are also defined in terms of being monuments, groups of buildings or sites, based on existing international conventions. IGESPAR regularly proposes the listing of new assets based on its mission to safeguard national heritage. As time goes by, a wide variety of new buildings and groups of structures of varying typologies have been added to the national register of monuments, such modernist architecture, vernacular landscapes, archaeological sites, monastic buildings/structures, historical gardens, and more recently human-built business and industrial establishments.

The listing process follows a strict procedure defined by Decree-Law no. 309/2009 (23 October 2009), which entered into force in January 2010.

IGESPAR also monitors and participates in the UNESCO registry of World Heritage Sites as a member state: there are 13 UNESCO World Heritage Sites in territory of Portugal. Similarly, eleven assets in the UNESCO world heritage list of 878 sites were former Portuguese possessions at one time, spread across three continents (Africa, America and Asia) associated with period of Portuguese Discoveries.

=== Prehistoric ===
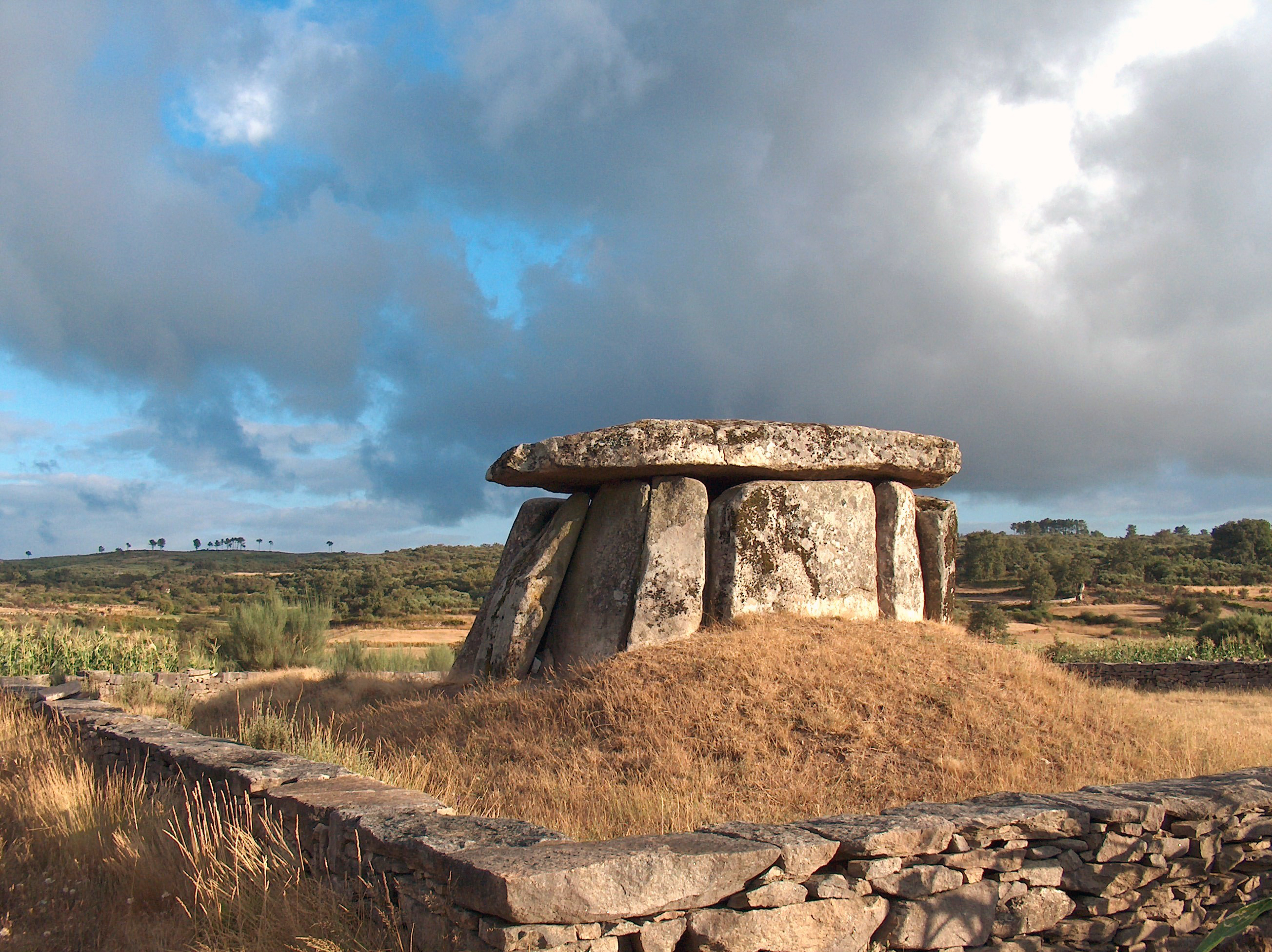
Dolmen of Pendilhe located in Pendilhe, municipality of Vila Nova de Paiva

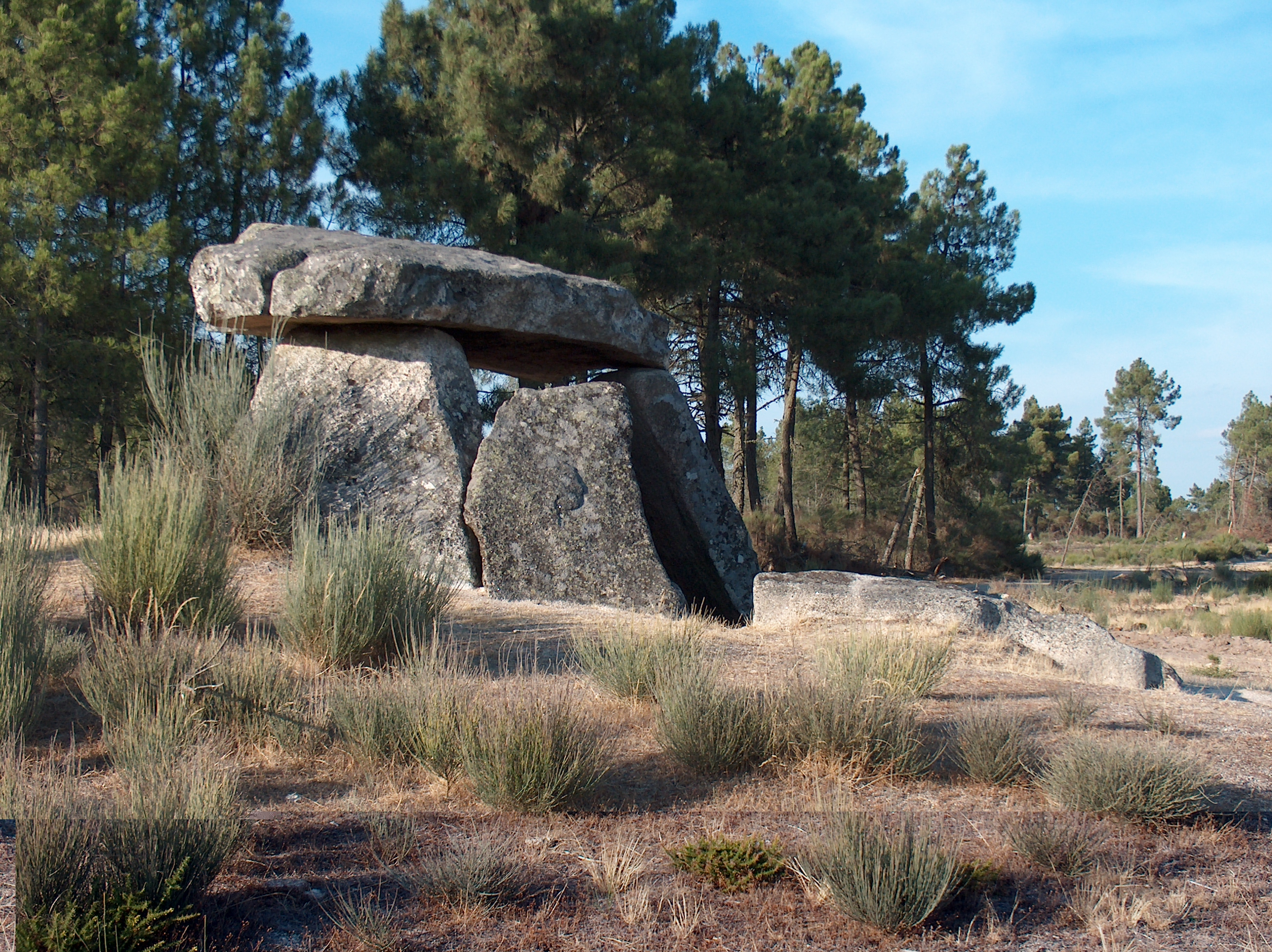
Dolmen of Fonte Coberta, Vila Chã, municipality of Alijó

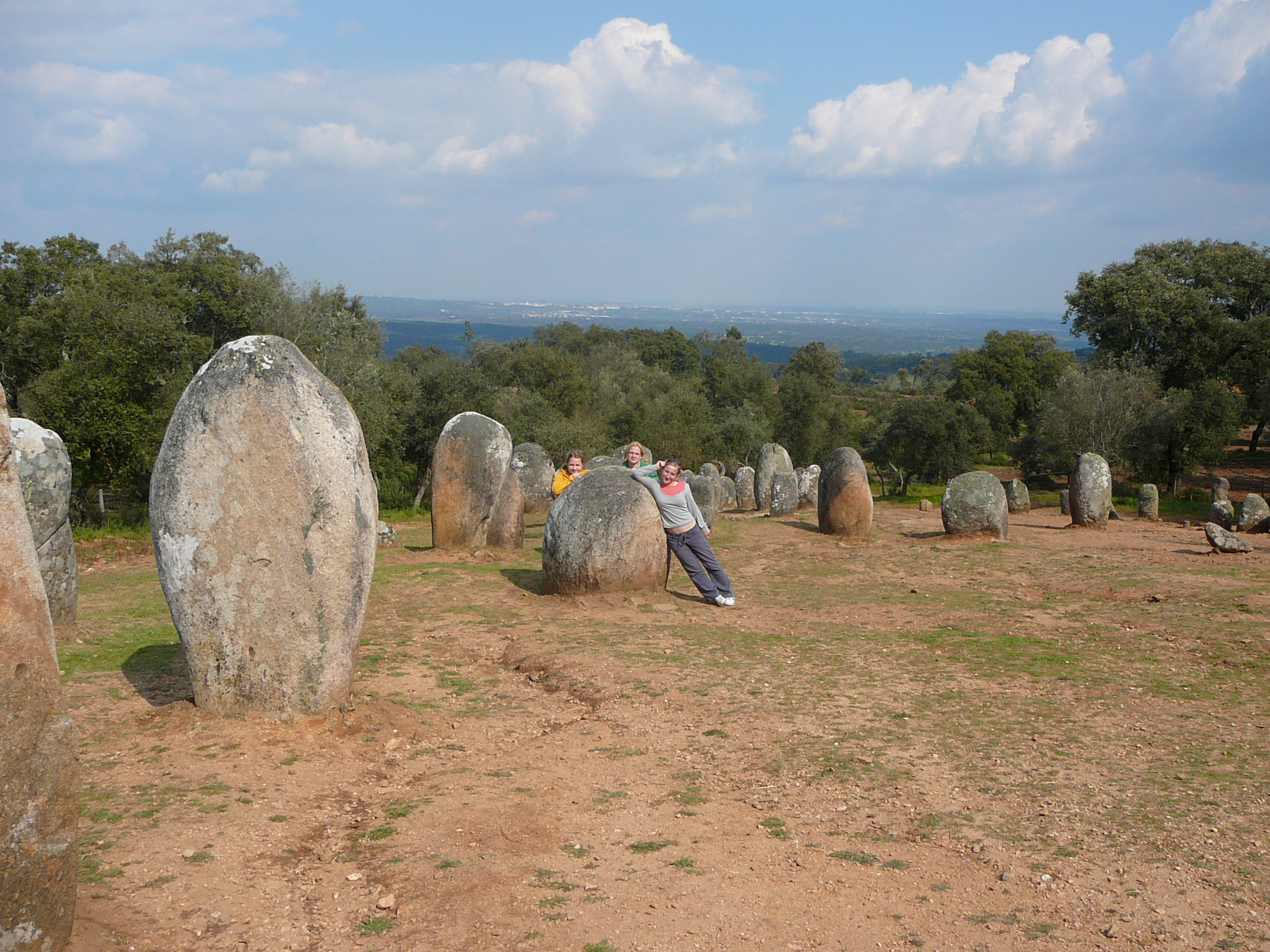
The arranged rocks of the Cromolech of Almendres, in Nossa Senhora de Guadalupe, municipality of Évora

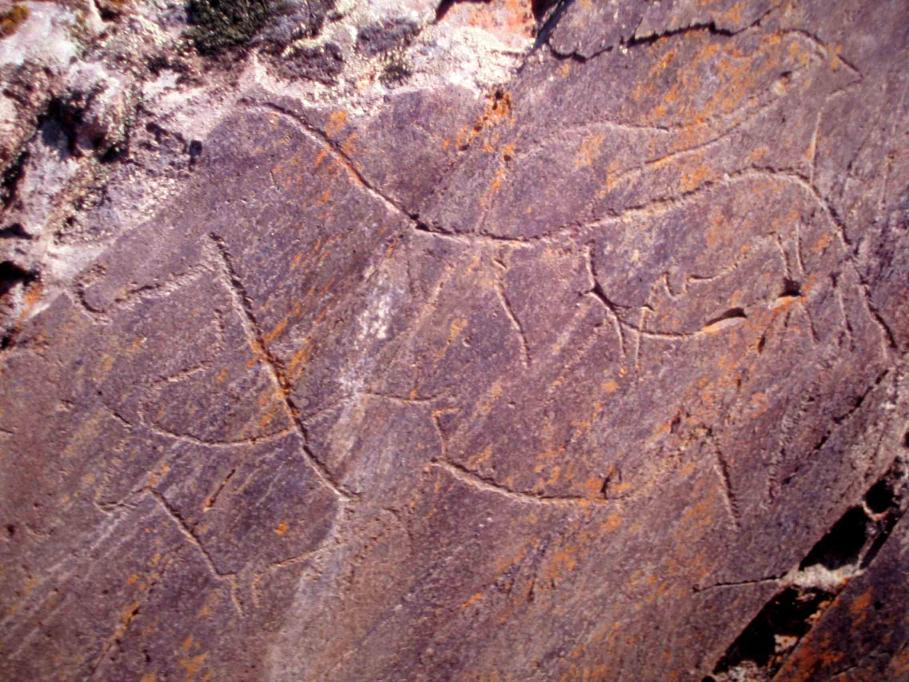
Rock drawings in the UNESCO designated Prehistoric Rock-Art Sites in the Côa Valley and Siega Verde

Alentejo region

- Archaeological Site of Senhor dos Mártires (Santa Maria do Castelo, Alcácer do Sal)
- Castro of Castelo Velho (Terena, Alandroal)
- Castro of Cola (Ourique, Ourique)
- Cromlech of the Almendres (Almendres, Évora)
- Cave of Nossa Senhora da Luz (Rio Maior, Rio Maior)
- Dolmen of Alto de Miraflores (Barbacena, Elvas)
- Dolmen of Arraiolos (Arraiolos, Arraiolos)
- Dolmen of Barrocal (Nossa Senhora da Tourega, Évora)
- Dolmen of Cabeça Gordo (Barbacena, Elvas)
- Dolmen of Casa dos Galhardos (Santa Maria da Devessa, Castelo de Vide)
- Dolmen of Coureleiros II (Santiago Maior, Castelo de Vide)
- Dolmen of Coutada de Alcogulo (Santa Maria da Devessa, Castelo de Vide)
- Dolmen of Coutada de Barbacena (Barbacena, Elvas)
- Dolmen of D. Miguel (Barbacena, Elvas)
- Dolmen of Fonte de Mouratão (São João Baptista, Castelo de Vide)
- Dolmen of Herdade da Candeira (Redondo, Redondo)
- Dolmen of Herdade das Comendas (Nossa Senhora do Bispo, Montemor-o-Novo)
- Dolmen of Herdade das Dessouras (Redondo, Redondo)
- Dolmen of Herdade de Freixo (Monte do Trigo, Portel)
- Dolmen of Herdade de Galvoeira (Nossa Senhora de Machede, Évora)
- Dolmen of Herdade de Montinho (Nossa Senhora de Machede, Évora)
- Dolmen of Herdade da Murteira (Torre de Coelheiros, Évora)
- Dolmen of Herdade da Ordem (Maranhão, Avis)
- Dolmen of Herdade da Serranheira (Nossa Senhora do Bispo, Montemor-o-Novo)
- Dolmen of Herdade do Silval (Nossa Senhora da Graça do Divor, Évora)
- Dolmen of Herdade da Tisnada (Torre de Coelheiros, Évora)
- Dolmen of Herdade de Tourais (Nossa Senhora da Vila, Montemor-o-Novo)
- Dolmen of Herdade de Zambujal (São Bento do Mato, Évora)
- Dolmen of Olival de Monte Velho (Barbacena, Elvas)
- Dolmen of Paço das Vinhas (Canaviais, Évora)
- Dolmen of Paiva (Paiva, Mora)
- Dolmen of Paredes (Nossa Senhora da Graça do Divor, Évora)
- Dolmen of Pinheiro do Campo (São Sebastião de Giesteira, Évora)
- Dolmen of Porto de Cima de D. Miguel (Barbacena, Elvas)
- Dolmen of Melriça (Santiago Maior, Castelo de Vide)
- Dolmen of Nave do Grou (São João Baptista, Castelo de Vide)
- Dolmen of Pêro d'Alva (Santa Maria da Devessa, Castelo de Vide)
- Dolmen of Pombais (Santa Maria da Devessa, Castelo de Vide)
- Dolmen of São Brissos (Santiago do Escoural, Montemor-o-Novo)
- Dolmen of Silval (Nossa Senhora da Graça do Divor, Évora)
- Dolmen of Torna de Paço Pereira (Barbacena, Elvas)
- Dolmen of Torrão (Barbacena, Elvas)
- Dolmen of Várzea dos Mourões (Santiago Maior, Castelo de Vide)
- Dolmen of Velada (Nossa Senhora do Bispo, Montemor-o-Novo)
- Dolmen of Venda do Duque (Vimieiro, Arraiolos)
- Dolmen of Vidigueira (Redondo, Redondo)
- Dolmen of Vila de Nisa (Espírito Santo, Nisa)
- Dolmen of Vila Nova de São Pedro (Vila Nova de São Pedro, Azambuja)
- Great Dolmen of Comenda da Igreja (Nossa Senhora do Bispo, Montemor-o-Novo)
- Great Dolmen of Zambujeiro (Nossa Senhora da Tourega, Évora)
- Great Dolmens of Paço (Nossa Senhora do Bispo, Montemor-o-Novo)
- Lagar of Varas do Fojo (Santo Agostinho, Moura)
- Megalithic Monuments of Vale do Rodrigo (Nossa Senhora da Tourega, Évora)
- Menhir of Abelhoa (Monsaraz, Reguengos de Monsaraz)
- Menhir of Courela da Casa Nova (Silveiras, Montemor-o-Novo)
- Menhir of Outeiro (Monsaraz, Reguengos de Monsaraz)
- Prehistoric Rock-Art Site of Escoural (Santiago do Escoural, Montemor-o-Novo)
- Prehistoric Rock-Art Site of Vale de Junco (Esperança, Arronches)

Algarve region

- Megalithic Monuments of Alcalar (Mexilhoeira, Portimão)
- Megalithic Monuments of Quinta da Nora (Vila Nova de Cacela, Vila Real de Santo António)

Centro region

- Castro of Bom Successo (Mangualde, Mangualde)
- Castro of Nossa Senhora da Guia (Baiões, São Pedro do Sul)
- Castro of São Miguel de Amêndoa ((Amêndoa, Mação)
- Castro of Zambujal (Santa Maria do Castelo e São Miguel, Torres Vedra)
- Cave of Ermigeira (Maxial, Sintra)
- Dolmen of Aldeia da Mata (Aldeia da Mata, Crato)
- Dolmen of Arca (Arca, Oliveira de Frades)
- Dolmen of Cas-Freires (Ferreira de Aves, Sátão)
- Dolmen of Carapito I (Carapito, Aguiar da Beira)
- Dolmen of Cunha Baixa (Cunha Baixa, Mangualde)
- Dolmen of Crato (Crato e Mártires, Crato)
- Dolmen of Mamaltar do Vale de Fachas (Rio de Loba, Viseu)
- Dolmen of Orca, (Oliviera do Conde, Carregal do Sal)
- Dolmen of Paranhos (Paranhos, Seia)
- Dolmen of Penalva (Antas, Penalva do Castelo)
- Dolmen of Queiriga (Queiriga, Vila Nova de Paiva)
- Dolmen of Tintinolho (Faia, Guarda)
- Funerary Monument of Tholos do Barro (São Pedro e Santiago, Torres Vedras)
- Megalithic Monuments of Serra da Brenha (Alhadas, Figueira da Foz)
- Painted Dolmen of Antelas (Pinheiro de Lafões, Oliveira de Frades)

Lisbon region

- Archaeological Site of Lapa do Fumo (Castelo, Sesimbra)
- Archaeological Site of Pedra de Ouro (Cadafais, Alenquer)
- Archaeological Site of Quinta de Rouxinol (Corroios, Seixal)
- Barreira Megalithic Complex
- Artificial caves of Casal do Pardo, Palmela
- Castro of Rocha Forte (Lamas, Cadaval)
- Dolmen of Adrenunes (Colares, Sintra)
- Dolmen of Agualva (São Martinho, Sintra)
- Dolmen of Belas (Agualva-Cacém, Sintra)
- Dolmen of Pedras Negras (Caneças, Odivelas)
- Megalithic Monuments of Casaínhos (Fanhões, Loures)
- Praia das Maçãs Prehistoric Monument (Colares, Sintra)
- Megalithic Monuments of Roça do Casal do Meio (Castelo, Sesimbra)

Norte region

- Castro of Aldeia Nova Miranda do Douro, Miranda do Douro)
- Castro of Alvarelhos (Alvarelhos, Tofa)
- Castro of Arades (Aplendurada e Matos, Marco de Canaveses)
- Castro of Ázere (Ázere, Arcos de Valdevez)
- Castro of Briteiros (Salvador de Briteiros, Guimarães)
- Castro of Melgaço (Paderne, Melgaço)
- Castro of Monte Padrão (Monte Córdova, Santo Tirso)
- Castro of Monte Redondo (Guisande, Braga)
- Castro of Sabroso (São Martinho de Sande, Guimarães)
- Castro de Sacóias (Baçal, Bragança)
- Castro of Santa Maria dos Galegos (Santa Maria dos Galegos, Barcelos)
- Castro of São Caetano (Longos Vales, Monção)
- Prehistoric Rock-Art Site of Vale de Côa (Vila Nova de Foz Côa)
- Dolmen of Aboboreira (Ovil, Baião)
- Dolmen of Aliviado (Escariz, Arouca)
- Dolmen of Barrosa (Vila Praia de Âncora, Caminha)
- Dolmen of Capela de Nossa Senhora do Monte (Penela da Beira, Pendono)
- Dolmen of Casal-Mau (Santa Eulália), Arouca)
- Dolmen of Fonte Coberta (Vila Chã, Alijó)
- Dolmen of Santa Maria (Santa Maria, Penafiel)
- Dolmen of Serra de Soajo (Soajo, Arcos de Valdevez)
- Dolmens of Serra do Alvão (Lixa do Alvão, Vila Pouca de Aguiar)
- Dolmen of Vale da Rua (Sobrado, Castelo de Paiva)
- Dolmen of Vilarinho (Vilarinho da Castanheira, Carrazeda de Ansiães)
- Lajes das Fogaças (Lanhelas, Caminha)
- Prehistoric Rock-Art Site of Cachão da Rapa (Ribalonga, Carrazeda de Ansiães)

=== Archeological ===
The Roman Temple of Évora in the parish of Sé e São Pedro, municipality of Évora)

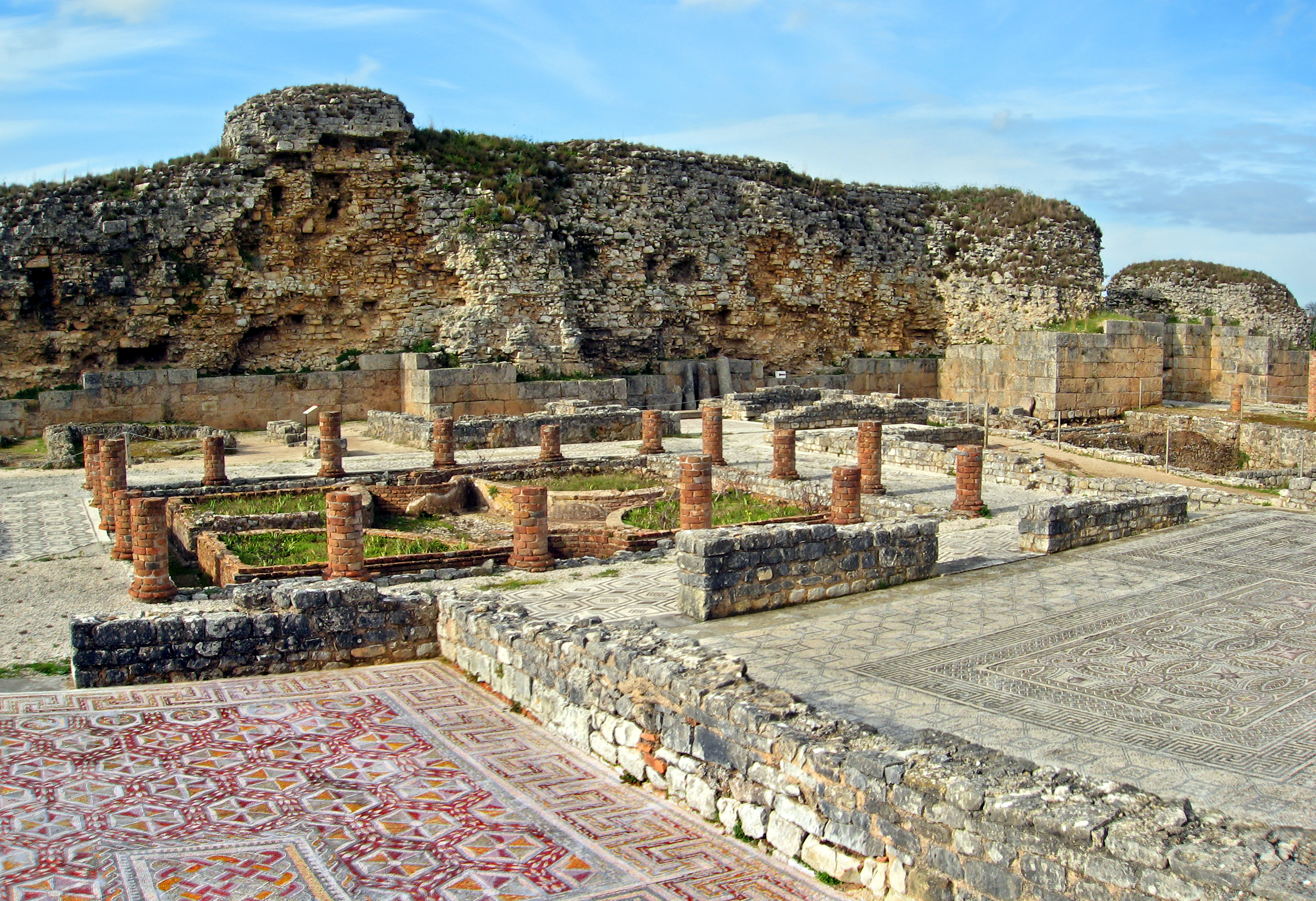
The mosaicked floors of the Roman Ruins of Conímbriga, in (Condeixa-a-Velha, municipality of Condeixa-a-Nova)

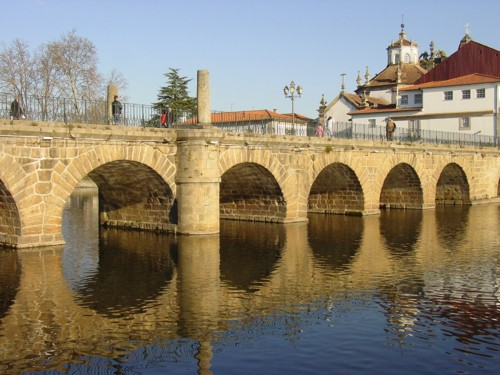
The Trajan's Bridge surmounting the Tâmega River in Chaves

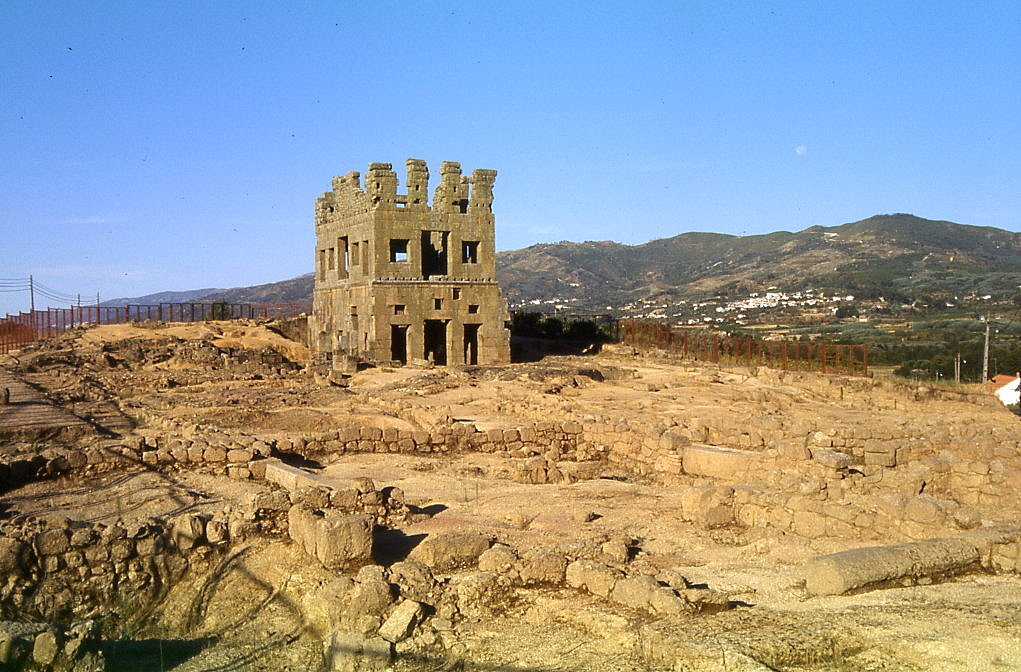
The isolated tower of Centum Cellas in Colmeal da Torre, municipality of Belmonte

Alentejo region

- Archaeological Site of Quinta de Suratesta (Santa Maria da Feira, Beja)
- Lusitanian-Roman Ruins of Santa Vitória de Ameixal (Santa Vitória de Ameixal, Estremoz)
- Lusitanian-Roman Ruins of Torre de Palma (Vaiamonte, Monforte)
- Lusitanian-Roman Ruins of Villa of Torre de Palma (Vaiamonte, Monforte)
- Roman Ruins of Tróia (Carvalhal, Grândola)
- Roman Arch of Beja (Santa Maria da Feira, Beja)
- Roman Arch of D. Isabel (Sé e São Pedro, Évora)
- Roman Bridge of Vila Formosa (Seda, Alter do Chão)
- Roman Bridge of Vila Ruiva (Vila Ruiva, Cuba)
- Roman Ruins of Ammaia (São Salvador da Aramenha, Marvão)
- Roman Ruins of Marvão (São Salvador da Aramenha, Marvão)
- Roman Ruins of Santa Vitória do Ameixial (Santa Vitória do Ameixial, Estremoz)
- Roman Ruins of São João do Campo (Arraiolos, Arraiolos)
- Roman Ruins of São Cucufate, (Vila dos Frades, Vidigueira)
- Roman Temple of Évora (Sé e São Pedro, Évora)
- Shell Mounds of Muge (Muge, Salvaterra de Magos)

Algarve region

- Arab Cistern of Silves (Silves, Silves)
- Archaeological Site of Quinta de Abicada (Mexilhoeira, Portimão)
- Roman Ruins of Milreu (Estói, Faro)

Centro region

- Cave of Viriato (São José, Viseu)
- Conímbriga Aqueduct (Condeixa-a-Velha, Condeixa-a-Nova)
- Roman Baths of Lafões (Várzea, São Pedro do Sul)
- Roman Ruins of Bobadela (Bobadela, Oliveira do Hospital)
- Roman Ruins of Conímbriga (Condeixa-a-Velha, Condeixa-a-Nova)
- Roman Ruins of Egitânia (Idanha-a-Nova, Idanha-a-Nova)
- Roman Temple of Scallabis (Marvila, Santarém)
- Tower of Centum Cellas (Colmeal da Torre, Belmonte)

Lisbon region

- Caves of Quinta do Anjo (Quinta do Anjo, Palmela)
- Lusitanian-Roman Ruins of Vila Cardillio (Santa Maria, Torres Novas)
- Lusitanian Statues of Montalegre (Santa Maria de Belem, Lisbon)
- Tombstone of Deus Esculápio (Santa Maria de Belém, Lisbon)

Norte region

- Archaeological Site of Alto da Fonte de Milho (Canelas, Peso da Régua)
- Archaeological Site of Freixo-Tongóbriga (Freixo, Marco de Canaveses)
- Fountain of the Idol (São José de São Lázaro, Braga)
- Lagars of Praia de Angeiras (Lavra, Matosinhos)
- Monastery of Dumio (Dume, Braga)
- Millenarian Markers of Geira (Campo do Gerês, Terras de Bouro)
- Roman Thermae of Maximinus (Cividade, Braga)
- Roman Bridge of Chaves (Madalena, Chaves)
- Roman Bridge of Mondim de Basto (Mondim de Basto, Mondim de Basto)
- Roman Bridge of Tâmega (São Gonçalo, Amarante)
- Roman Road from Braga to Chaves (Cervos, Montalegre)
- Roman Road from Braga to Guimarães (São Nicolau, Marco de Canaveses))
- Roman Road from Braga to Porto (São Pedro de Avioso), Maia)
- Roman Road from Braga to Porto (Santiago de Bougado, Tofa)
- Roman Road from Braga to Tui (Arcozelo, Ponte de Lima)
- Roman Road from Braga to Tui (Rubiães, Paredes de Coura)
- Roman Sanctuary of Panóias (Vale de Nogueiras, Vila Real)
- Ruins of Bagunte (Bagunte, Vila do Conde)
- Ruins of Santa Luzia (Areosa, Viana do Castelo)
- Sanctuary of Panóias (Vale de Nogueiras, Vila Real)
- Tidal Pools of Leça da Palmeira (Leça da Palmeira, Matosinhos)
- Tombstone of Taipas (Caldelas, Guimarães)

=== Civic ===
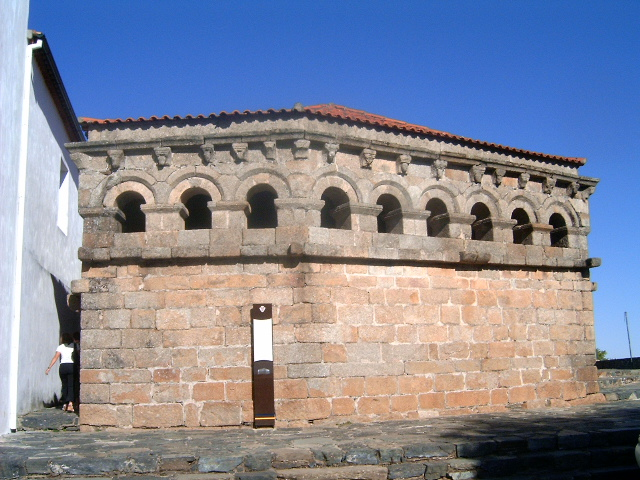
The Romanesque inspired Domus Municipalis, built in the 14th century

The front façade of the Queluz National Palace with ornate water fountain

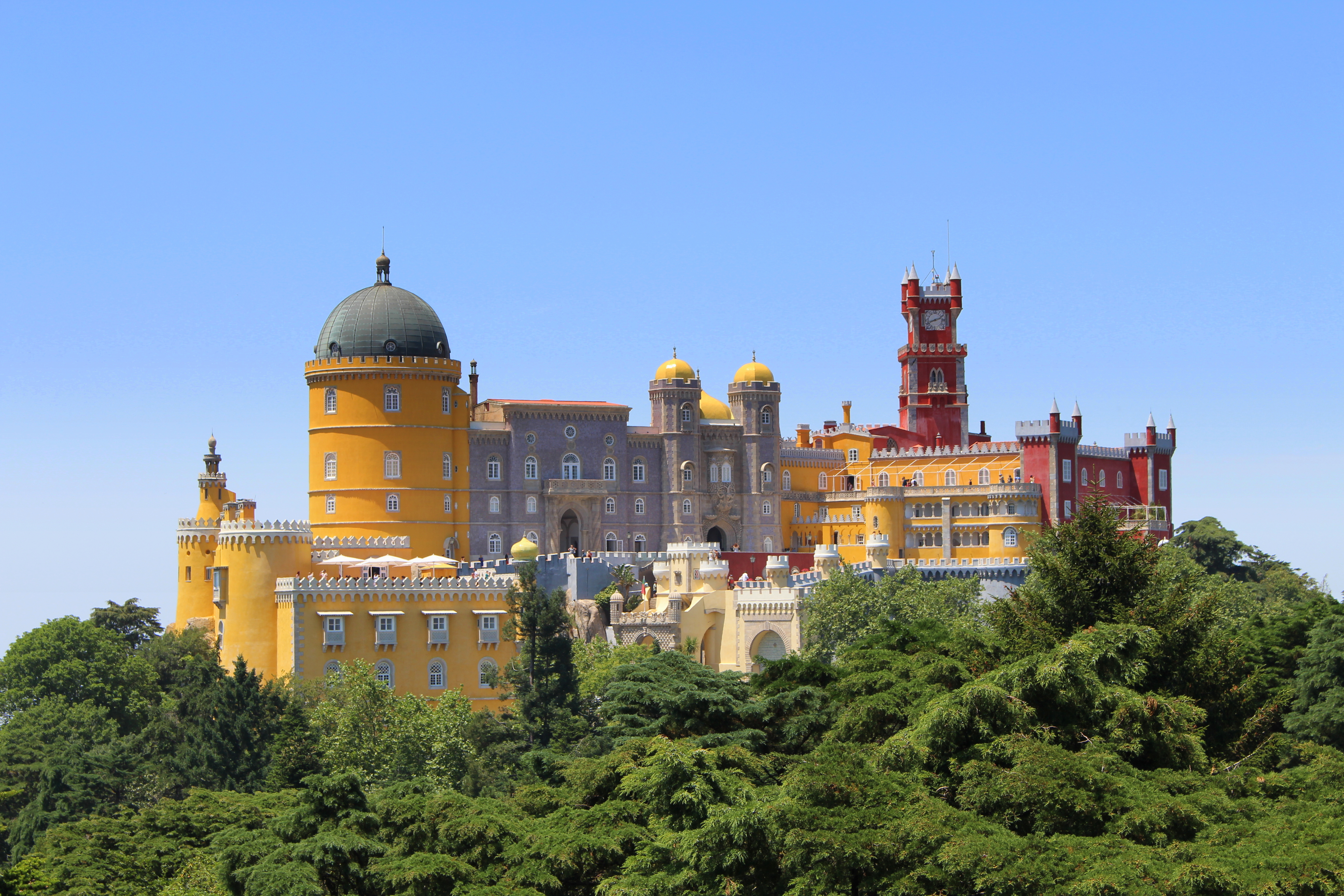
The multi-coloured Pena National Palace used as a summer home for the Royal Family in Sintra

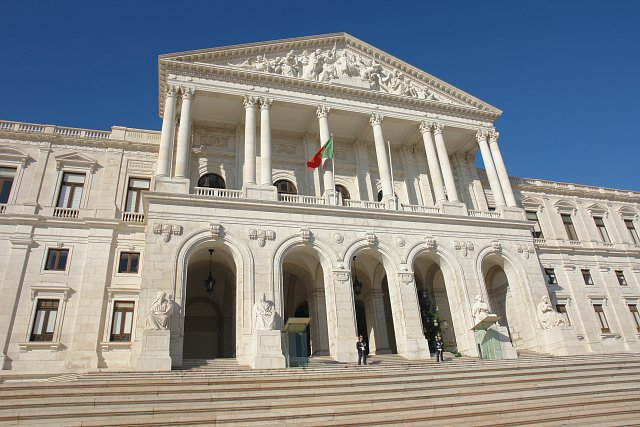
The São Bento Palace modern home of the Portuguese National Assembly

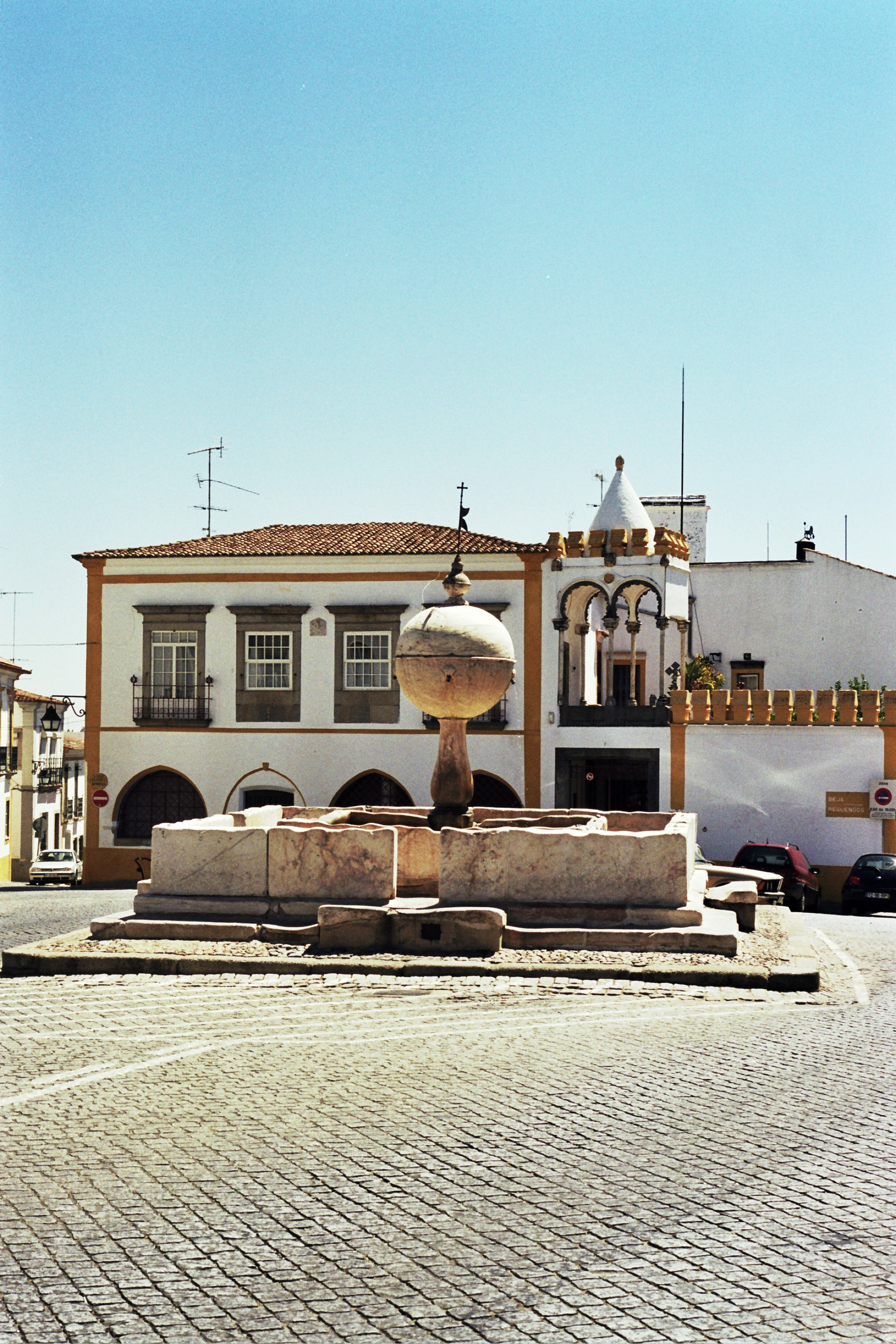
Fountain of Portas da Moura (Sé e São Pedro, Évora)

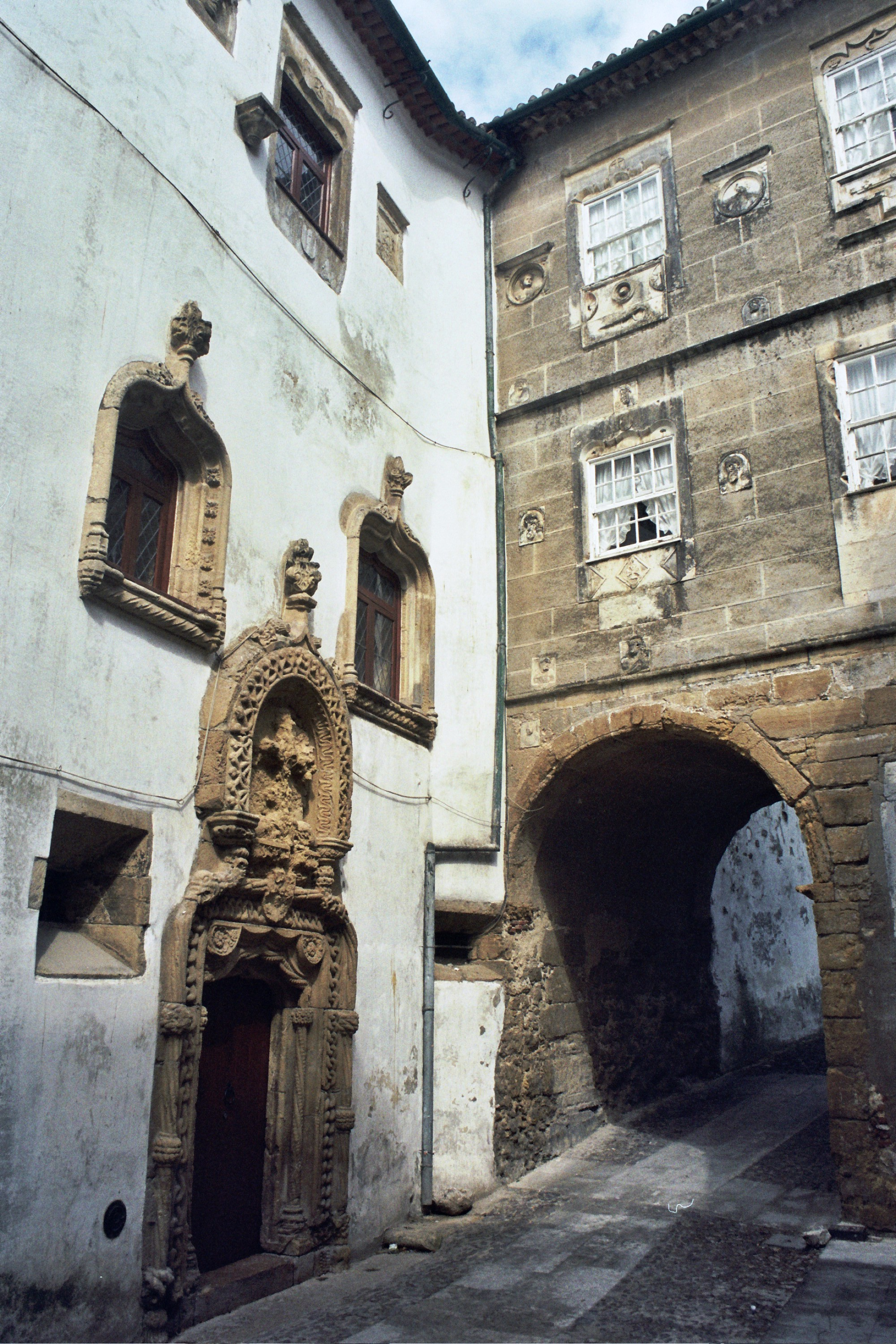
Palace of Sub-Ripas (Sé Nova, Coimbra)

Alentejo region

- Aqueduct of Amoreira (São Brás e São Lourenço, Elvas)
- Aqueduct of Prata (São Mamede, Évora)
- Bridge of Mértola (Mértola, Mértola)
- College of Santo Espírito (Sé e São Pedro, Évora)
- Estate of Água de Peixes (Alvito, Alvito)
- Estate of Sempre Noiva (Arraiolos, Arraiolos
- Fountain of Bicas (Matriz, Borba)
- Fountain of Montemor-o-Velho (Nossa Senhora do Bispo, Montemor-o-Novo)
- Fountain of Portas da Moura (Sé e São Pedro, Évora)
- Fountain of Praça do Giraldo (Santo Antão, Évora)
- Historical Centre of Évora (Santo Antão/Sé e São Pedro, Évora)
- Hospital of the Misericórdia (Santiago Maior, Beja)
- Memorial of Ameixal (Santa Vitória de Ameixal, Estremoz)
- Memorial of Elvas (Alcáçova, Elvas)
- Memorial of Montes Claros (Rio de Moinhos, Borba
- Palace of D. Manuel (São Pedro, Évora)
- Palace of Ficalho (Santa Maria, Serpa
- Palace of the Counts of Basto (Sé e São Pedro, Évora)
- Palace of the Dukes of Vila Viçosa (Nossa Senhora da Conceição, Vila Viçosa)
- Pillory of Arraiolos (Arraiolos, Arraiolos
- Pillory of Cabeça de Vide (Cabeço de Vide, Fronteira)
- Pillory of Campo Maior (Nossa Senhora da Expectação, Campo Maior)
- Pillory of Estremoz (Santa Maria, Estremoz)
- Pillory of Vila Viçosa (Nossa Senhora da Conceição, Vila Viçosa)
- Residence of D. Nuno de Sousa (Sé, Portalegre)
- Residence of Garcia de Resendes (Sé e São Pedro, Évora)
- Residence of the Alcalde (Santa Maria, Estremoz)
- Walls of the Praça de Elvas (Alcáçova, Elvas)

Algarve region

- Arch of Vila-a-Dentro (Sé, Faro)

Centro region

- Aqueduct of the Convent of Christ (São João Baptista, Tomar)
- Aqueduct of Torres Vedras (Matacães, Torres Vedras)
- Arch of the Almedina (São Bartolomeu, Coimbra)
- Bridge of Castelo Rodrigo (Castelo Rodrigo, Figueira de Castelo Rodrigo)
- Bridge of Cabril (Pedrógão Grande, Pedrógão Grande)
- Cloister of Manga (Santa Cruz, Coimbra)
- Fountain of Ameada (Aguiar da Beira, Aguiar da Beira)
- Fountain of Canos (São Pedro e Santiago, Torres Vedras)
- Fountain of Figueiras (Marvila, Santarém)
- Moorish City/Mata do Antanhol (Antanhol, Coimbra)
- National Palace of Mafra (Mafra, Mafra)
- Palace of Sub-Ripas (Sé Nova, Coimbra)
- Pillory of Aguiar da Beira (Carapito, Aguiar da Beira)
- Pillory of Alcanede (Alcanede, Santarém)
- Pillory of Batalha (Batalha, Batalha)
- Pillory of Castle Rodrigo (Castelo Rodrigo, Figueira de Castelo Rodrigo)
- Pillory of Figueira da Foz (São Julião da Figueira da Foz, Figueira da Foz)
- Pillory of Fundão (Fundão, Fundão)
- Pillory of Lousã (Lousã, Lousã)
- Pillory of Melo (Melo, Gouveia)
- Pillory of Moreira de Rei (Moreira de Rei, Trancoso)
- Pillory of Penela (Santa Eufémia, Penela)
- Pillory of Pinhel (Pinhel), Pinhel)
- Pillory of Ranhados (Ranhados, Mêda)
- Pillory of Trancoso (Santa Maria, Trancoso)
- Residence of Aristides de Sousa Mendes (Cabanas de Viriato, Carregal do Sal)
- Residence of Castelo Melhor (Santiago da Guarda, Ansião)
- Residence of Manuel Guimarães (São João Baptista, Tomar)
- Residence on Rua de D. Duarte (Santa Maria de Viseu, Viseu)
- Residence on Rua dos Moinhos (São João Baptista, Tomar)
- São Sebastião Aqueduct (Sé Nova, Coimbra)
- Tower of Ameada (Aguiar da Beira, Aguiar da Beira)
- Tower of Almofala (Almofala, Figueira de Castelo Rodrigo)
- Tower of São Pedro (São Pedro, Gouveia)
- Tower of the Relógio Velho (Pombal, Pombal)
- University of Coimbra (Sé Nova, Coimbra)

Lisbon region

- Águas Livres Aqueduct (Campolide, Lisbon)
- Casa dos Bicos (Sé Justa, Lisbon)
- Caves of Carenque (Mina, Amadora)
- Botanical Gardens of Lisbon (São Mamede, Lisbon)
- Building of the National Cordage Factory (Santa Maria de Belém, Lisbon)
- Elevator of Santa Justa (São Nicolau, Lisbon)
- Estate of Quinta da Penha Verde (São Martinho, Sintra)
- Fountain of Esperança (Santos-o-Velho, Lisbon)
- Headquarters of the Calouste Glubenkian Foundation (Nossa Senhora de Fátima, Lisbon)
- Memorial of Campo Pequeno (São João de Deus, Lisbon)
- National Palace of Ajuda (Santa Maria de Belém, Lisbon)
- National Palace of Belém (Santa Maria de Belém, Lisbon)
- National Palace of Pena (São Pedro de Penaferrim, Sintra)
- National Palace of Queluz (Queluz, Sintra)
- National Palace of Sintra (São Martinho, Sintra)
- National Theatre of São Carlos (Mártires, Lisbon)
- Palace of Almada-Carvalhais (São Paulo, Lisbon)
- Palace of Bacalhoa (São Simão, Setúbal)
- Palace of Bemposta (Pena, Lisbon)
- Palace of Monserrate (São Martinho, Sintra)
- Palace of São Bento (Lapa, Lisbon)
- Palace of the Counts of Almada (Santa Justa, Lisbon)
- Palace of the Marquess of Fronteira (São Domingos de Benfica)
- Palace of the Marquess of Pombal (Oeiras e São Julião da Barra, Oeiras)
- Palace of Vale Flor (Alcântara, Lisbon)
- Palacete of Feu Guião (Nossa Senhora da Anunciada, Setúbal)
- Palacete of Pombal (Queluz, Sintra)
- Pillory of Aldeia Galega da Merceana (Aldeia Galega da Merceana, Alenquer)
- Pillory of Colares (Colares, Sintra)
- Pillory of Lisbon (Santo Estêvão, Lisbon)
- Pillory of Óbidos (Santa Maria, Óbidos)
- Pillory of Palmela (Quinta do Anjo, Palmela)
- Pillory of Sesimbra (Santiago, Sesimbra)
- Pillory of Setúbal (Nossa Senhora da Anunciada, Setúbal)
- Pillory of Vila Franca de Xira (Vila Franca de Xira, Vila Franca de Xira)
- Portal of Gafaria (Santa Maria da Graça, Setúbal)
- Praça do Comércio (Madalena, Lisbon)
- Royal Ice Factory of Serra de Montejunto (Lamas, Cadaval)
- School of Conde de Ferreira de Sesimbra (Santiago, Sesimbra)
- Tombstone of Pedras Negras (Madalena, Lisbon)
- Waterworks of the Vila of Sintra (São Martinho, Sintra)

Norte region

- Agueduct of Vila do Conde (Vila do Conde, Vila do Conde)
- Arch of Porta Nova (Sé, Braga)
- Bridge of Barcelos (Barcelos, Barcelos)
- Bridge of Cava da Velha (Castro Laboreiro, Melgaço)
- Bridge of Cavez (Caves, Cabeceiras de Basto)
- Bridge of D. Maria Pia (Bomfim, Porto)
- Bridge of Langoncinha (Lousado, Vila Nova de Famalicão)
- Bridge of Mem Gutierres (Esperança, Póvoa de Lanhoso)
- Bridge of Mirandela (Mirandela, Mirandela)
- Bridge of Ponte de Barca (Ponte da Barca, Ponte da Barca)
- Bridge of Ponte de Lima (Ponte de Lima, Ponte de Lima)
- Bridge of Prado (São Paio de Merelim, Braga)
- Bridge of Proselo (Prozelo, Amares)
- Bridge of Rodas (Caldelas, Amares)
- Bridge of Serves (Gondar, Guimarães)
- Bridge of Taipas (Caldelas, Guimarães)
- Bridge of Torre de Dona Chama (Torre de Dona Chama, Mirandela)
- Bridge of Vizela (São João de Caldas de Vizela, Vizela)
- Domus Municipalis (Santa Maria, Bragança)
- Episcopal Palace of Porto (Sé, Porto)
- Estate of Quinta de Aveleda (Penafiel, Penafiel)
- Estate of Mateus (Mateus, Vila Real)
- Fountain of Caminha (Matriz, Caminha)
- Fountain of Passeio Alegre (Foz do Douro, Porto)
- Fountain of Praça da Rainha (Santa Maria Maior, Viana do Castelo)
- Fountain of Vilar dos Frades (Areias de Vilar, Barcelos)
- Fountain of Vilar de Mouros (Vilar de Mouros, Caminha)
- Fountain of Virtudes (Miragaia, Porto)
- Historical Centre of Guimarães (Creixomil, Guimarães)
- Historical Centre of Porto (Massarelos, Porto)
- Hospital of Santo António (Miragaia, Porto)
- Memorial of Bom Jesus de Matosinhos (Matosinhos, Matosinhos)
- Memorial of D. João I (Creixomil, Guimarães)
- Memorial of Lordelo (Ancede, Baião)
- Memorial of Santo António do Burgo (Santa Eulália, Arouca)
- Memorial of the Battle of Salado (Oliveira do Castelo, Guimarães)
- Municipal Hall of Guimarães (Oliveira do Castelo, Guimarães)
- Municipal Hall of Viana do Castelo (Santa Maria Maior, Viana do Castelo)
- Palace of Bolsa (São Nicolau, Porto)
- Palace of Brejoeira (Pinheiro, Monção)
- Palace of Dona Loba (Padronelo, Amarante)
- Palace of Freixo (Campanhã, Porto)
- Palace of Geila (Geila, Arcos de Valdevez)
- Palace of the Dukes of Braganza (Barcelos, Barcelos)
- Palace of the Dukes of Braganza (Oliveira do Castelo, Guimarães)
- Palace of the Terrenas Tower (Massarelos, Porto)
- Palace of the Viscondes de Carreira (Santa Maria Maior, Viana do Castelo)
- Palatial Estate of Pinheiros (Barcelos, Barcelos)
- Pillory of Arcos de Valdevez (Arcos de Valdevez, Arcos de Valdevez)
- Pillory of Amares (Amares, Amares)
- Pillory of Ansiães (Lavandeira, Carrazeda de Ansiães)
- Pillory of Bragança (Santa Maria, Bragança)
- Pillory of Foz Côa (Vila Nova de Foz Côa, Vila Nova de Foz Côa)
- Pillory of Freixe de Espada à Cinto (Freixo de Espada à Cinta, Freixo de Espada à Cinta)
- Pillory of Lousada (Lousada, Lousada)
- Pillory of Marco (São Nicolau, Marco de Canaveses)
- Pillory of Murça (Murça, Murça)
- Pillory of Penafiel (Penafiel, Penafiel)
- Pillory of Ponte de Barca (Ponte da Barca, Ponte da Barca)
- Pillory of Póvoa de Varzim (Póvoa de Varzim, Póvoa de Varzim)
- Pillory of Rua (Rua, Moimenta da Beira)
- Pillory of Soajo (Soajo, Arcos de Valdevez)
- Pillory of Vila do Conde (Vila do Conde, Vila do Conde)
- Pillory of Vila Nova de Cerveira (Vila Nova de Cerveira, Vila Nova de Cerveira)
- Residence of Rua da Alfândega Velha (Sé, Porto)
- Residence of João Velho (Santa Maria Maior, Viana do Castelo)
- Residence of Miguel de Vasconcelos (Santa Maria Maior, Viana do Castelo)
- Sete Fontes (São Vitor, Braga)
- Tea House of Boa Nova (Leça da Palmeira, Matosinhos)
- Tower of Ucanha (Ucanha, Tarouca)

=== Military ===
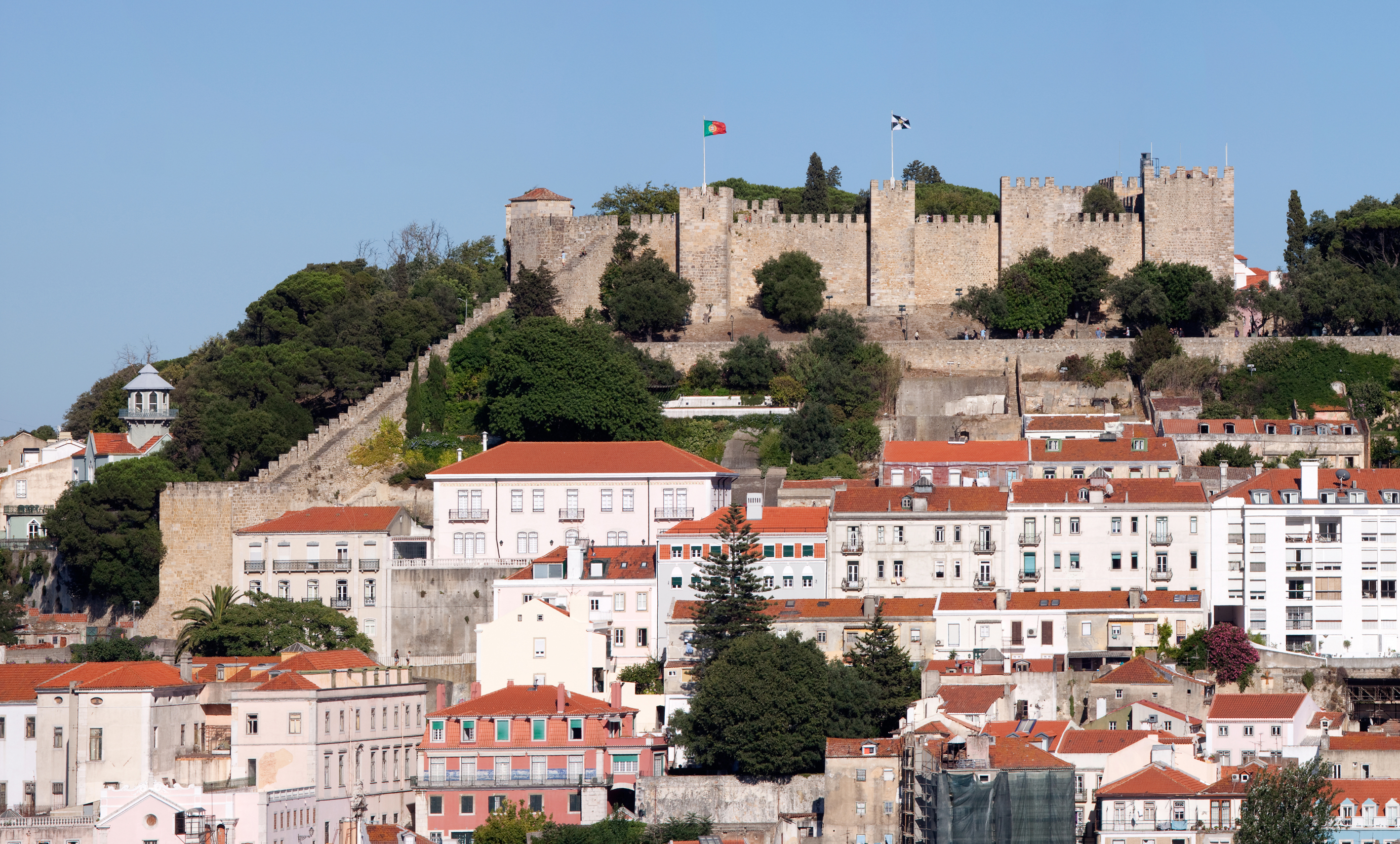
The Castle of São Jorge (Lisbon), a Moorish castle conquered by the Christian armies of Afonso Henriques

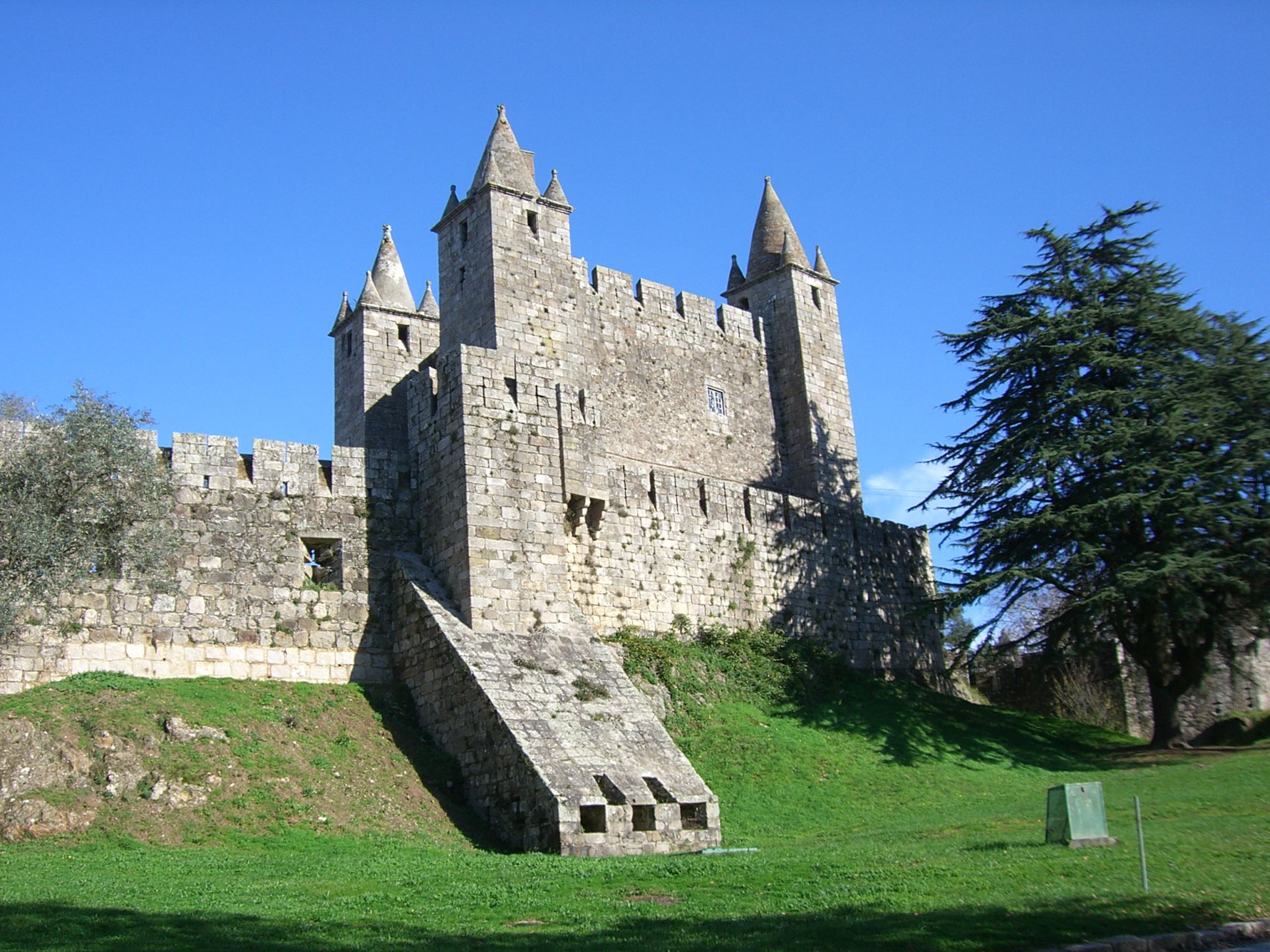
The Castelo of Feira (Santa Maria da Feira), erected over a temple dedicated to god Bandeveluco-Toiraeco

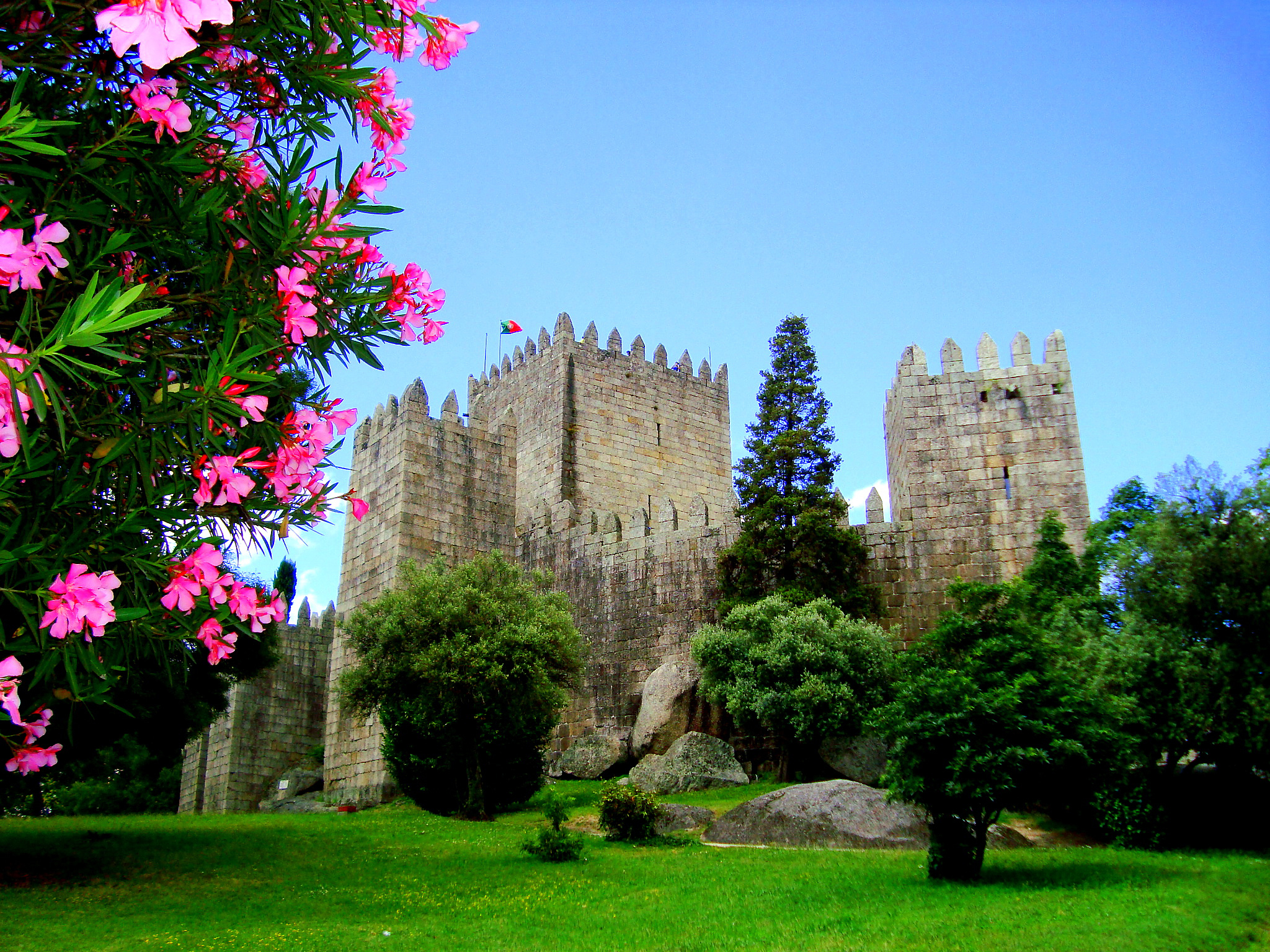
The cradle of Portuguese history; the Castle of Guimarães where Afonso Henriques established his first Court

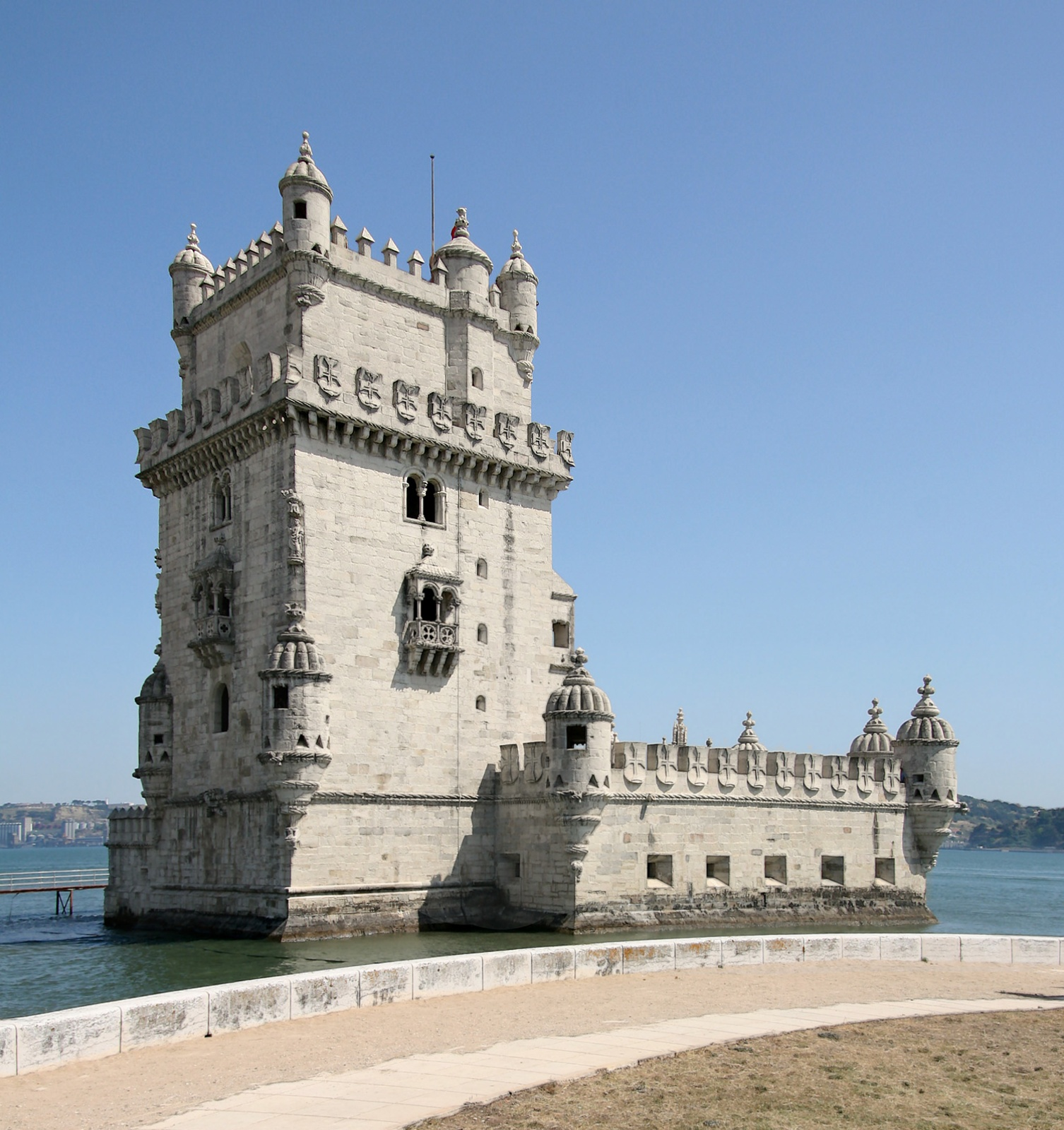
The ornate bastions and tower of the Belém Tower, iconic symbol of Lisbon and defensive bulwark on the Tagus River

Alentejo region

- Castle of Alandroal (Terena, Alandroal)
- Castle of Alcácer do Sal (Santa Maria do Castelo, Alcácer do Sal)
- Castle of Alegrete (Alegrete, Portalegre)
- Castle of Alter do Chão (Alter do Chão, Alter do Chão)
- Castle of Alvito (Alvito, Alvito)
- Castle of Amieira do Tejo (Ameira do Tejo, Nisa)
- Castle of Arraiolos (Arraiolos, Arraiolos
- Castle of Aviz (Avis, Avis)
- Castle of Beja (Santiago Maior, Beja)
- Castle of Belver (Belver, Gavião)
- Castle of Campo Maior (São João Baptista, Campo Maior)
- Castle of Castelo de Vide (Santa Maria da Devessa, Castelo de Vide)
- Castle of Elvas (Alcáçova, Elvas)
- Castle of Estremoz (Santa Maria, Estremoz)
- Castle of Évoramonte (Santa Maria, Estremoz)
- Castle of Lousa (Luz, Mourão)
- Castle of Marvão (Santa Maria de Marvão, Marvão)
- Castle of Mértola (Mértola, Mértola)
- Castle of Montemor-o-Velho (Nossa Senhora da Vila, Montemor-o-Novo)
- Castle of Noudar (Barrancos, Barrancos)
- Castle of Portalegre (Sé, Portalegre)
- Castle of Portel (Portel, Portel)
- Castle de Redondo (Redondo, Redondo)
- Castle of Santiago do Cácem (Santiago do Cacém, Santiago do Cacém)
- Castle of Terena (Terena, Alandroal)
- Castle of Valongo (Nossa Senhora de Machede, Évora)
- Castle of Viana do Alentejo (Viana do Alentejo, Viana do Alentjo)
- Castle of Vila Viçosa (Nossa Senhora da Conceição, Vila Viçosa)
- Gate of Aviz (Sé e São Pedro, Évora)
- Gate of Montalvão (Nossa Senhora da Graça, Nisa)
- Military Battleground of Ameixal (Santa Vitória de Ameixal, Estremoz)
- Fort of Nossa Senhora da Graça (Alcáçova, Elvas)
- Tower of Aguias (Brotas, Mora)
- Tower of the Dukes of Cadaval (Sé e São Pedro, Évora)
- Tower of Sisebuto (Sé e São Pedro, Évora)
- Walls of Évora (Sé e São Pedro, Évora)
- Walls of Monsaraz (Monsaraz, Reguengos de Monsaraz)
- Walls of Serpa (Salvador, Serpa

Algarve region

- Castle of Castro Marim (Castro Marim, Castro Marim)
- Castle of Lagos (Santa Maria, Lagos)
- Castle of Loulé (São Clemente, Loulé)
- Castle of Silves (Silves, Silves)
- Castle of Tavira (Santiago, Tavira)
- Fortress of Sagres (Sagres, Vila do Bispo)

Centro region

- Castle of Alfaiates (Alfaiates, Sabugal)
- Castle of Almoural (Praia da Ribatejo, Vila Nova da Barquinha)
- Castle of Belmonte (Belmonte, Belmonte)
- Castle of Castelo Bom (Castelo Bom, Almeida
- Castle of Castelo Mendo (Castelo Mendo, Almeida
- Castle of Castelo Rodrigo (Castelo Rodrigo, Figueira de Castelo Rodrigo)
- Castle of Celorico da Beira (Santa Maria), Celorico da Beira)
- Castle of Guarda (Sé, Guarda)
- Castle of Leiria (Leiria, Leiria)
- Castle of Linhares (Linahres), Celorico da Beira)
- Castle of Longroiva (Longroiva, Mêda)
- Castle of Lousã (Lousã, Lousã)
- Castle of Marialva (Marialva, Mêda)
- Castle of Monsanto (Monsanto, Idanha-a-Nova)
- Castle of Montemor-o-Velho (Montemor-o-Velho, Montemor-o-Velho)
- Castle of Moreira de Rei (Moreira de Rei, Trancoso)
- Castle of Óbidos (Santa Maria, Óbidos)
- Castle of Ourém (Nossa Senhora das Misericórdias, Ourém)
- Castle of Palmela (Quinta do Anjo, Palmela)
- Castle of Penela (Santa Eufémia, Penela)
- Castle of Pinhel (Pinhel, Pinhel)
- Castle of Pombal (Pombal, Pombal)
- Castle of Porto de Mós (São Pedro, Porto de Mós)
- Castle of Sabugal (Sabugal, Sabugal)
- Castle of Feira (Feira, Santa Maria da Feira)
- Castle of Sesimbra (Castelo, Sesimbra)
- Castle of Sortelha (Sortelha, Sabugal)
- Castle of Soure (Soure, Soure)
- Castle of Tomar (São João Baptista, Tomar)
- Castle of Torres Novas (Santa Maria, Torres Novas)
- Castle of Trancoso (Santa Maria, Trancoso)
- Fort of Praia do Consolação (Atouguia, Peniche)
- Fort of São João Baptista (São Pedro, Peniche)
- Fortress of Peniche (São Pedro, Peniche)
- Military Battleground of Aljubarrota 1 (Batalha, Batalha)
- Military Battleground of Aljubarrota 2 (Calvaria de Cima, Porto de Mós)
- Tower of Ante (Almedina, Coimbra)
- Tower of Cabaças (Marvila, Santarém)
- Walls of Setúbal (Santa Maria da Graça, Setúbal)
- Walls of the Praça de Almeida (Almeida, Almeida)
- Walls of Viseu (Santa Maria de Viseu, Viseu)

Lisbon region

- Forte of Cavalo (Santiago, Sesimbra)
- Fort of Santiago (Santiago, Sesimbra)
- Castle of São Jorge (Castelo, Lisbon)
- Castle of the Moors (São Pedro de Penaferrim, Sintra
- Tower of Belém (Santa Maria de Belém, Lisbon)

Norte region

- Castle of Almourol (Praia do Ribatejo, Vila Nova da Barquinha)
- Castle of Carrazeda de Ansiães (Lavandeira, Carrazeda de Ansiães)
- Castle of Arnóia (Arnóia, Celorico de Basto)
- Castle of Braga (São João do Souto, Braga)
- Castle of Bragança (Santa Maria, Bragança)
- Castle of Castro Laboreiro (Castro Laboreiro, Melgaço)
- Castle of Chaves (Santa Maria Maior, Chaves)
- Castle of Faria (Pereira, Barcelos)
- Castle of Freixe de Espada à Cinto (Freixo de Espada à Cinta, Freixo de Espada à Cinta)
- Castle of Guimarães (Oliveira do Castelo, Guimarães)
- Castle of Ínsua (Moledo, Caminha)
- Castle of Lanhoso (Nossa Senhora do Amparo, Póvoa de Lanhoso)
- Castle of Lindoso (Lindoso, Ponte da Barca)
- Castle of Monção (Monção, Monção)
- Castle of Montalegre (Montalegre, Montalegre)
- Castle of Mogadouro (Mogadouro, Mogadouro)
- Castle of Melgaço (Vila, Melgaço)
- Castle of Monforte (Monforte, Chaves)
- Castle of Montalegre (Montalegre, Montalegre)
- Castle of Montemor-o-Velho (Montemor-o-Velho, Montemor-o-Velho)
- Castle of Numão (Numão, Vila Nova de Foz Côa)
- Castle of Pena de Aguiar (Telões, Vila Pouca de Aguiar)
- Castle of Penas Roias (Penas Roias, Mogadouro)
- Castle of Penedono (Penedono, Penedono)
- Castle of Santo Estêvão (Santo Estêvão, Chaves)
- Castle of Vila Nova de Cerveira (Vila Nova de Cerveira, Vila Nova de Cerveira)
- Castle of Vinhais (Vinhais), Vinhais)
- Citadel of Sanfins (Sanfins de Ferreira, Paços de Ferreira)
- Castle of São Filipe (Nossa Senhora da Anunciada, Setúbal)
- Fortifications of the Praça de Valença do Minho (Valença, Valença)
- Tower of Barcelos (Barcelos, Barcelos)
- Tower of Caminha (Matriz, Caminha)
- Tower of Lapela (Lapela, Monção)
- Tower of Quintela (Vila Marim, Vila Real)
- Walls of D. Fernando (Miragaia, Porto)
- Walls of Guimarães (Oliveira do Castelo, Guimarães)
- Walls of Vila Velha de Santa Cruz (Adeganha, Torre de Moncorvo)

=== Natural ===
- Cultural Landscape of Sintra (Sintra)

=== Religious ===
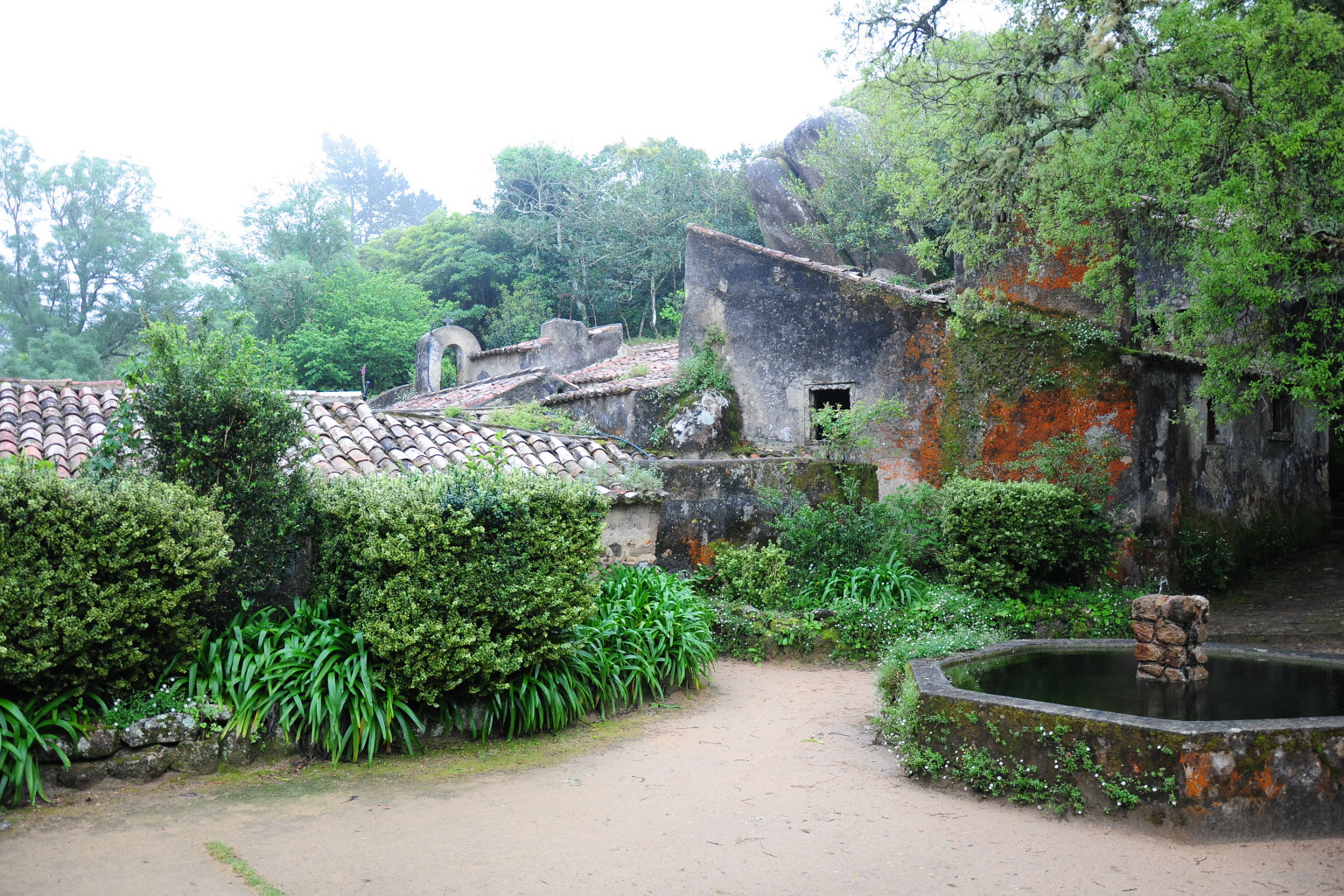
The humble hermitage Convent of the Capuchos secluded in the forests of Sintra Nature Park

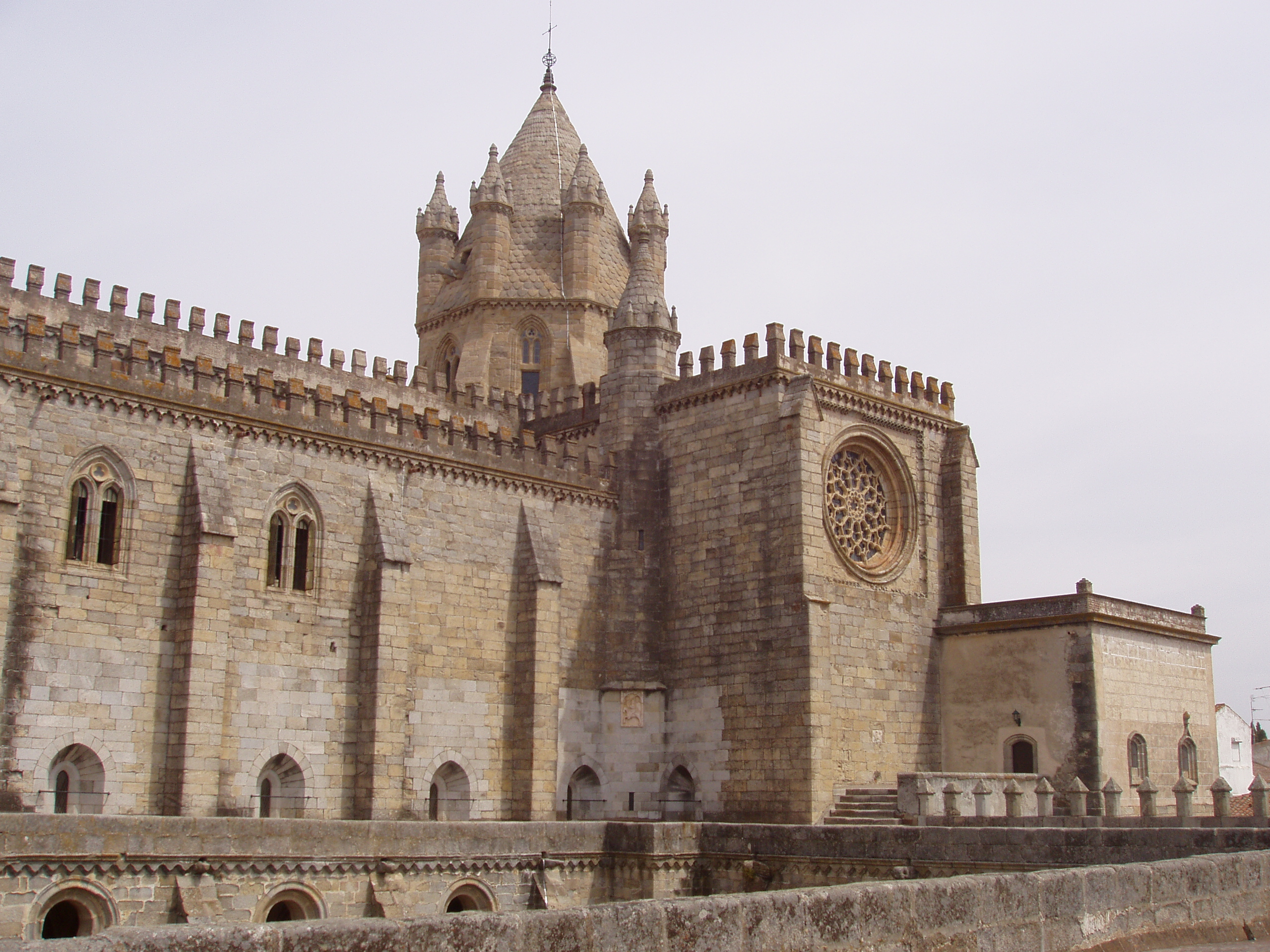
Lateral wall and transept of the Cathedral of Évora with lantern-tower and the rose window

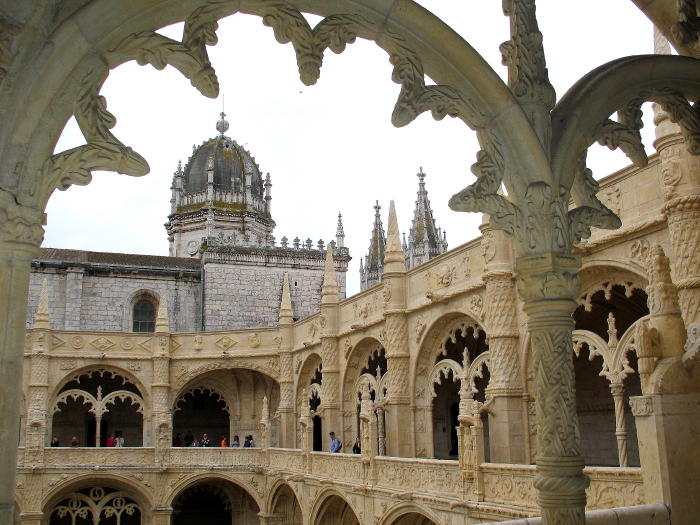
The interior cloister of the Monastery of the Jeronimos with its Manueline architecture

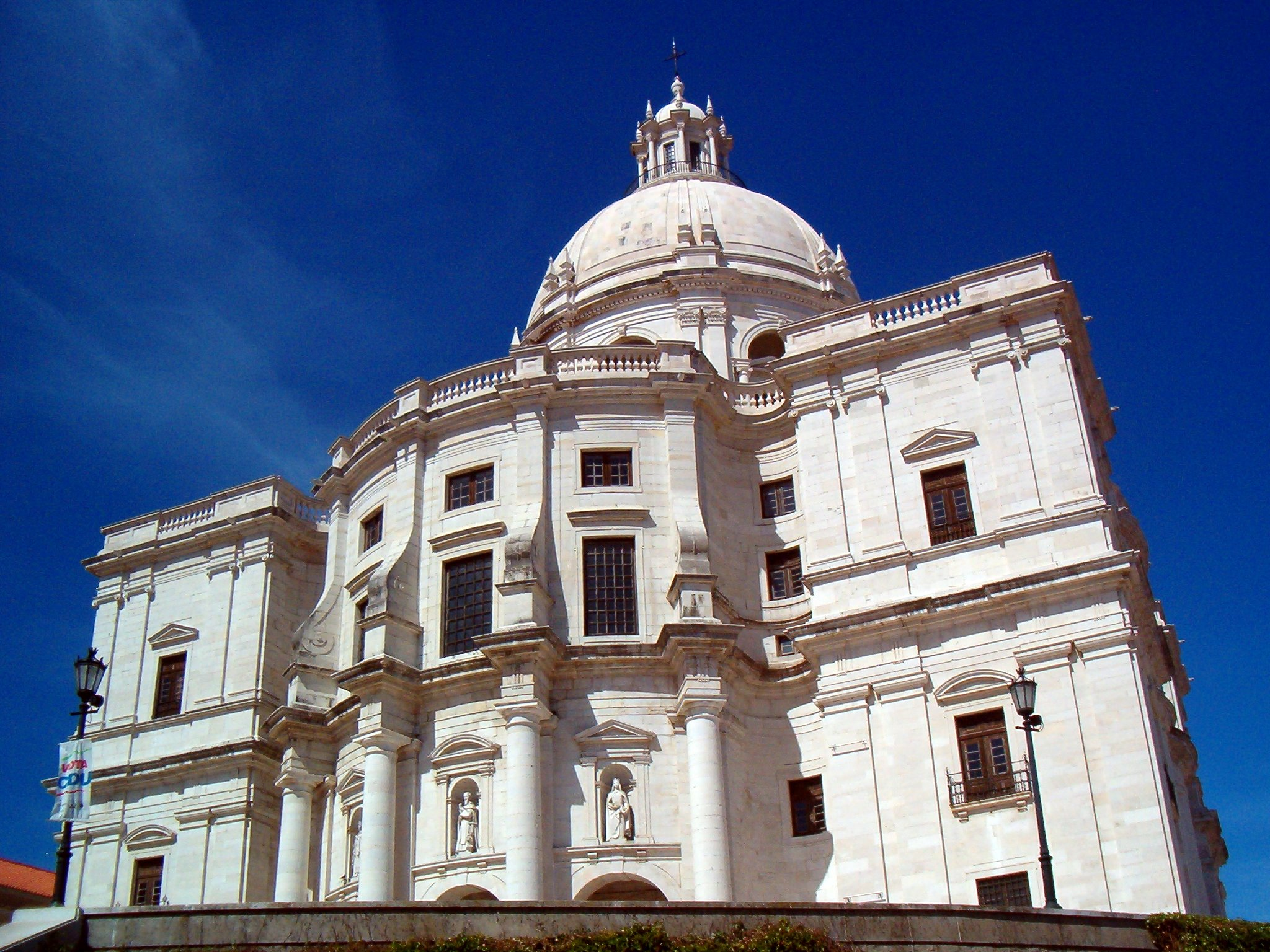
The monumental funerary Church of Santa Engrácia, home to the National Pantheon

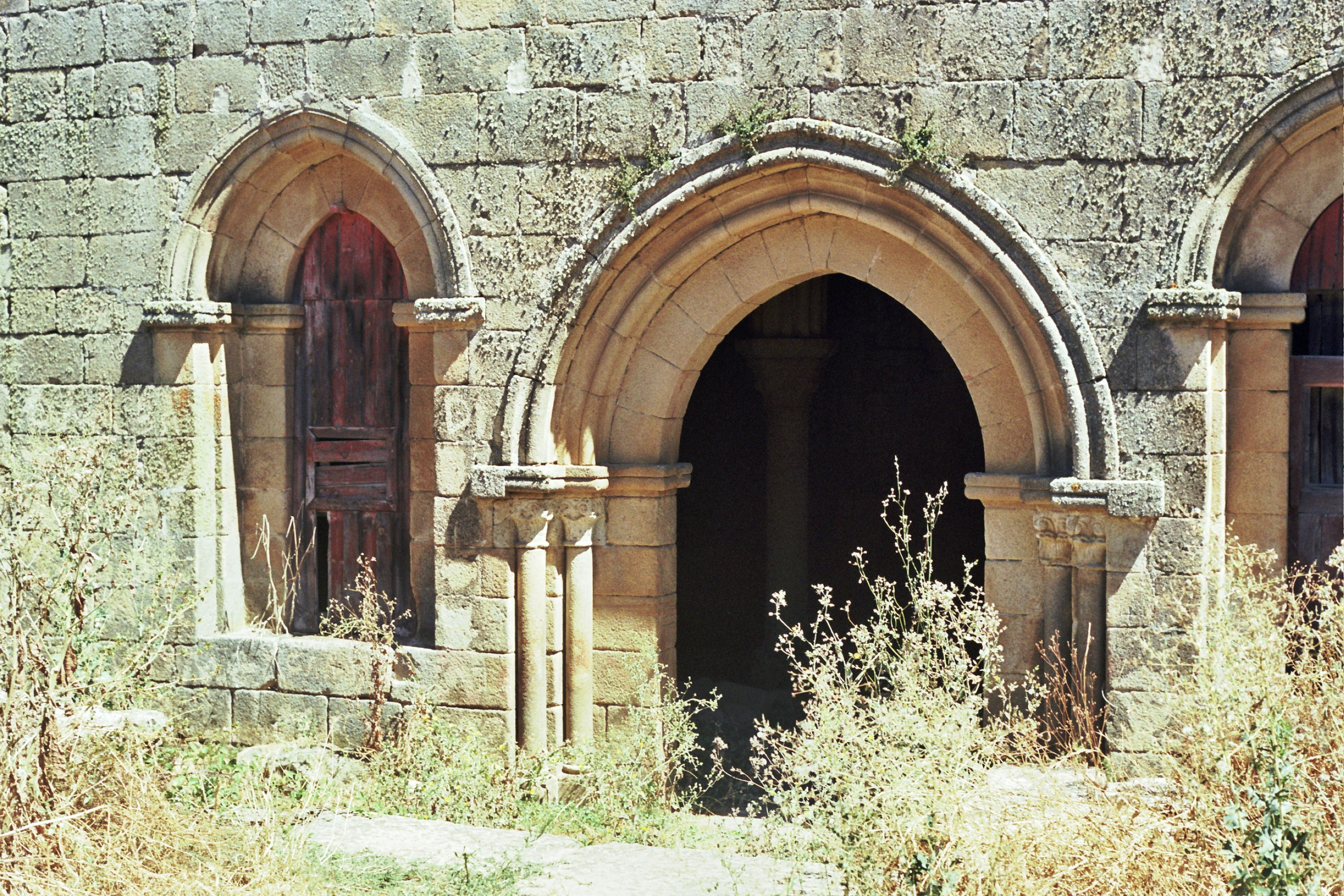
Church of Santa Maria de Aguiar (Castelo Rodrigo, Figueira de Castelo Rodrigo

Alentejo region

- Cathedral of Évora (Sé e São Pedro, Évora)
- Cathedral of Portalegre (Sé, Portalegre)
- Chapel of D. Fradique of Portugal (Santo André, Estremoz)
- Chapel of Nossa Senhora dos Mártires (Santa Maria, Estremoz)
- Chapel of Nossa Senhora das Salvas (Sines, Sines)
- Chapel of Santa Catarina de Monsaraz (Monsaraz, Reguengos de Monsaraz)
- Chapel of the Boa Nova (Terena, Alandroal)
- Church of Cartuxa (Bacelo, Évora)
- Church of Graça (Sé e São Pedro, Évora)
- Church of Nossa Senhora de Anunciação (Mértola, Mértola)
- Church of Nossa Senhora da Assunção (Alvito, Alvito)
- Church of Nossa Senhora da Assunção (Assunção, Arronches)
- Church of Nossa Senhora da Assunção (Assunção, Elvas)
- Church of Nossa Senhora da Conceição (Santa Maria da Feira, Beja)
- Church of Nossa Senhora do Espinheiro (Canaviais, Évora)
- Church of Paiva (Paiva, Mora)
- Church of Santa Clara (São Salvador, Santarém)
- Church of Santa Maria de Marvila (Marvila, Santarém)
- Church of Santa Marinha de Trevões (Trevões, São João da Pesqueira)
- Church of Santiago (Santiago do Cacém, Santiago do Cacém)
- Church of Santo Agostinho da Graça (Marvila, Santarém)
- Church of Santo Amaro (Santiago Maior, Beja)
- Church of Santo Aleixo (Santo Aleixo da Restauração, Moura)
- Church of Santo Estêvão (Marvila, Santarém)
- Church of São Bernardo (São Lourenço, Portalegre)
- Church of São Francisco (Santa Maria, Serpa
- Church of São Francisco (Santo André, Estremoz)
- Church of São Francisco (Sé e São Pedro, Évora)
- Church of São João Alporão (Marvila, Santarém)
- Church of São João Baptista (São João Baptista, Moura)
- Church of São Pedro (Caia e São Pedro, Elvas)
- Church of São Manços (São Manços, Évora)
- Church of São Domingos (Ajuda, Salvador e Santo Ildefonso, Elvas)
- Church of the Misericórida (São Nicolau, Santarém)
- Church of the Augustines (Nossa Senhora da Conceição, Vila Viçosa)
- Church of the Misericórdia (Santiago Maior, Beja)
- Church of the Seminary of Santarém (São Salvador, Santarém)
- Church of Viana do Alentejo (Viana do Alentejo, Viana do Alentejo)
- Cloister of the Misericórdia of Estremoz (Santo André, Estremoz)
- Convent of Chagas (Nossa Senhora da Conceição, Vila Viçosa)
- Convent of Lois (Sé e São Pedro, Évora)
- Convent of Monte Calvário (Sé e São Pedro, Évora)
- Convent of Nossa Senhora da Conceição (São Lourenço, Portalegre)
- Convent of Nossa Senhora da Saudação (Nossa Senhora da Vila, Montemor-o-Novo)
- Convent of Santa Clara (Sé, Portalegre)
- Convent of Santa Clara (Santo Antão, Évora)
- Convent of Santa Maria de Almoster (Almoster, Santarém)
- Convent of São Bento de Castris (Malagueira, Évora)
- Convent of São Francisco (Estremoz (Santa Maria e Santo André), Estremoz)
- Convent of São Francisco (São Salvador, Santarém)
- Cornerstone of the Church of Nossa Senhora de Entre-Águas (Benavila, Avis)
- Cross of Cabeço de Vide (Cabeço de Vide, Fronteira)
- Cross of Estrela (Santa Maria de Marvão, Marvão)
- Cross of São Bernardo (São Lourenço, Portalegre)
- Cross of Vila Viçosa (Nossa Senhora da Conceição, Vila Viçosa)
- Hermitage of Santo André (Santiago Maior, Beja)
- Monastery of Flor da Rosa (Flor da Rosa, Crato)
- Tomb of Fernão Rodrigues Redondo and Marinha Afonso (São Nicolau, Santarém)
- Tomb of João Afonso (São Nicolau, Santarém)

Algarve region

- Cathedral of Silves (Silves, Silves)
- Church of Estômbar (Estombar, Lagoa)
- Church of Graça (São Clemente, Loulé)
- Church of Loulé (São Clemente, Loulé)
- Church of Santa Maria do Castelo (Santa Maria, Tavira)
- Church of Santo António (São Sebastião, Lagos)
- Church of São Sebastião (São Sebastião, Lagos)
- Church of the Misericórdia of Loulé (São Clemente, Loulé)
- Convent of Nossa Senhora da Assunção (Sé, Faro)
- Cross of Portugal (Silves, Silves)
- Hermitage of Nossa Senhora de Guadalupe (Raposeira, Vila do Bispo)
- Cathedral of Silves (Silves, Silves)

Centro region

- Cathedral of Coimbra (Nova) (Sé Nova, Coimbra)
- Cathedral of Coimbra (Velha) (Almedina, Coimbra)
- Cathedral of Guarda (Sé, Guarda)
- Cathedral of Viseu (Santa Maria de Viseu, Viseu)
- Chapel of Nossa Senhora do Desterro (Alcobaça, Alcobaça)
- Chapel of São Jorge (Calvaria de Cima, Porto de Mós)
- Chapel of São Lourença (Santa Maria dos Olivais, Tomar)
- Chapel of São Pedro (Leiria, Leiria)
- Chapel of São Pedro (Seia, Seia)
- Chapel of Varziela (Cantanhede, Cantanhede)
- Chapel of Vista Alegre (São Salvador, Ílhavo)
- Church of Armamar (Armamar, Armamar)
- Church of Atalaia (Atalaia, Vila Nova da Barquinha)
- Church of Caldas da Rainha (Igreja de Nossa Senhora do Pópulo, Caldas da Rainha)
- Church of Carmo (Santa Cruz, Coimbra)
- Church of Coimbra (Velha) (Sé Velha, Coimbra)
- Church of Flor da Rosa (Flora da Rosa, Crato)
- Church of Góis (Góis, Góis)
- Church of Golegã (Golegã, Golegã)
- Church of Graça (Santa Cruz, Coimbra)
- Church of Jesus Cristo (Marvila, Santarém)
- Church of Louriçal (Louriçal, Pombal)
- Church of Nossa Senhora do Ameal (São Pedro e Santiago, Torres Vedras)
- Church of Nossa Senhora dos Anjos (Montemor-o-Velho, Montemor-o-Velho)
- Church of Nossa Senhora de Assunção (Pedrógão Grande, Pedrógão Grande)
- Church of Nossa Senhora da Conceição (Ermida, Castro Daire)
- Chapel of Nossa Senhora do Monte (São Salvador, Santarém)
- Church of São Gião (Famalicão, Nazaré)
- Church of São Vicente (São Vicente, Abrantes)
- Church of Santa Ana (Sé Nova, Coimbra)
- Church of Santa Eufémia (Santa Eufémia, Penela)
- Church of Santa Maria (Velha) (Canas de Santa Maria, Tomar)
- Church of Santa Maria de Aguiar (Castelo Rodrigo, Figueira de Castelo Rodrigo)
- Church of Santa Maria do Castelo (São João, Abrantes)
- Church of Santa Maria do Olival (Santa Maria dos Olivais, Tomar)
- Church of Santa Marinha (Moreira de Rei, Trancoso)
- Church of Santo António de Lourinhã (Lourinhã, Lourinhã)
- Church of Santiago (Belmonte, Belmonte)
- Church of Santiago (São Bartolomeu, Coimbra)
- Church of Santa Iria (Santa Maria dos Olivais, Tomar)
- Church of Santa Maria do Castelo (Santa Maria e São Miguel, Torres Vedras)
- Church of Santo Agostinho da Graça (Marvila, Santarém)
- Church of São Domingos (Santa Cruz, Coimbra)
- Church of São Domingos (São Paio, Guimarães)
- Church of São João Baptista (São João, Abrantes)
- Church of São João Baptista (São João Baptista, Tomar)
- Church of São João Baptista (Figueiró dos Vinhos, Figueiró dos Vinhos)
- Church of São João Baptista (Alcochete, Alcochete)
- Church of São João das Donas (Santa Cruz, Coimbra)
- Church of São João Evangelista (Glória e Vera Cruz, Aveiro
- Church of São Julião (São Julião, Setúbal)
- Church of São Leonardo (Atouguia, Peniche)
- Church of São Marcos (São Silvestre, Coimbra)
- Church of São Pedro (Arganil, Arganil)
- Church of São Pedro (São Pedro e Santiago, Torres Vedras)
- Church of São Salvador (Sé Nova, Coimbra)
- Church of Trofa (Trofa, Águeda)
- Church of the Castle (Lourinhã, Lourinhã)
- Church of the Exaltação de Santa Cruz (Batalha, Batalha)
- Church of Vestiaria (Vestiaria, Alcobaça)
- Church of Vouzela (Vouzela), Vouzela)
- College of São Agostinho (Almedina, Coimbra)
- College of São Jeronimo (Sé Nova, Coimbra)
- College of São Tomás (Sé Nova, Coimbra)
- Convent of Christ (São João Baptista, Tomar)
- Cross of Pedro Jacques (Mata de Lobos, Figueira de Castelo Rodrigo)
- Cross of São Marcos (São Silvestre, Coimbra)
- Convent of Santa Maria de Aguiar (Castelo Rodrigo, Figueira de Castelo Rodrigo)
- Cross of Cartaxo (Cartaxo, Cartaxo)
- Cross of Vendas (São Simão, Setúbal)
- Episcopal Palace of Coimbra (Sé Nova, Coimbra)
- Hermitage of Nossa Senhora da Conceição (São João Baptista, Tomar)
- Hermitage of São Brás (Horta das Figueiras, Évora)
- Monastery of Alcobaça (Alcobaça, Alcobaça)
- Monastery of Arouca (Arouca, Arouca)
- Monastery of Batalha (Batalha, Batalha)
- Monastery of Celas (Santo António dos Olivais, Coimbra)
- Monastery of Santa Maria de Maceira Dão (Fornos de Maceira Dão, Mangualde)
- Monastery of Santa Cruz (Santa Cruz, Coimbra)
- Monastery of Jesus (São Julião, Setúbal)
- Monastery of Lorvão (Lorvão, Penacova)
- Monastery of Santa Clara-a-Nova (Santa Clara, Coimbra)
- Monastery of Santa Clara-a-Velha (Santa Clara, Coimbra)
- Monastery of Santa Cruz (Santa Cruz, Coimbra)
- Monastery of Santa Maria de Salzedas (Salzedas, Tarouca)
- Monastery of Varatojo (São Pedro e Santiago, Torres Vedra)
- Seminary of Viseu (Santa Maria de Viseu, Viseu)
- Synagogue of Tomar (São João Baptista, Tomar)
- Tomb of D. João de Noronha (Santa Maria, Óbidos)
- Tomb of Fernão Gomes de Gois (Oliveira do Cal, Carregal do Sal)

Lisbon region

- Basilica of Estrela (Lapa, Lisbon)
- Cathedral of Lisbon (Sé, Lisbon)
- Chapel of Espírito Santo dos Mereantes (Santiago, Sesimbra)
- Chapel of Nossa Senhora dos Remédios (Santo Estêvão, Lisbon)
- Chapel of Santo Amaro (Alcântara, Lisbon)
- Chapel of Santo André (Mafra, Mafra)
- Chapel of the Castros (São Domingos de Benfica, Lisbon)
- Church of Chelos (Marvila, Lisbon)
- Church of Madalena (Madalena, Lisbon)
- Church of Mãe de Deus (São João, Lisbon)
- Church of Memória (Ajuda, Lisbon)
- Church of Menino de Deus (Socorro, Lisbon)
- Church of Nossa Senhora da Conceição Velha (Madalena, Lisbon)
- Church of Nossa Senhora da Graça (Palhais, Barreiro)
- Church of Nossa Senhora da Luz (Carnide, Lisbon)
- Church of Pena Longa (São Pedro de Penaferrim, Sintra)
- Church of Póvoa de Santo Andrião (Póvoa de Santo Andrião, Odivelas)
- Church of Santa Catarina (Santa Catarina, Lisbon)
- Church of Santa Engrácia (São Vicente de Fora, Lisbon)
- Church of Santa Luzia (Santiago, Lisbon)
- Church of Santa Maria (Loures, Loures)
- Church of Santa Maria (Santa Maria e São Miguel, Sintra)
- Church of Santiago de Palmela (Quinta do Anjo, Palmela)
- Church of Santo Antão-o-Novo (Santa Justa, Lisbon)
- Church of Santo António (Sé, Lisbon)
- Church of São Domingos (Santa Justa, Lisbon)
- Church of Santo Estêvão (Santo Estêvão, Lisbon)
- Church of São Pedro (Santo Estêvão, Alenquer)
- Church of São Pedro de Rates (Rates, Póvoa de Varzim)
- Church of São Quintino (Santo Quintino, Sobral de Monte Agraço)
- Church of São Roque (Sacramento, Lisbon)
- Convent of Carmo (Sacramento, Lisbon)
- Convent of Graça (Graça, Lisbon)
- Convent of the Hermits of São Paulo da Serra de Ossa (Santa Catarina, Lisbon)
- Church of the Sagrada Coração de Jesus (Coração de Jesus, Lisbon)
- Convent of São Francisco (Nossa Senhora da Anunciada, Setúbal)
- Convent of São Francisco (Santo Estêvão, Lisbon)
- Cross of Arroios (São Jorge de Arroios, Lisbon)
- Cross of Loures (Loures, Loures)
- Cross of Setúbal (São Julião, Setúbal)
- Cross of the Laranjeiras (Campo Grande, Lisbon)
- Episcopal Palace of São Cristóvão (São Cristóvão e São Lourenço, Lisbon)
- Hermitage of Restelo (Santa Maria de Belém, Lisbon)
- Monastery of Jerónimos (Santa Maria de Belém, Lisbon
- Monastery of Odivelas (Odivelas, Odivelas)
- Monastery of São Vicente de Fora (São Vicente de Fora, Lisbon)
- Memorial of Odivelas (Odivelas, Odivelas)
- Tomb of D. João das Regras, Church of São Domingos de Benfica (São Domingos de Benfica, Lisbon)
- Tomb of Queen Mariana da Vitória, Church of São Francisco de Paula (Prazeres, Lisbon)

Norte region

- Cathedral of Braga (Sé, Braga)
- Cathedral of Lamego (Sé, Lamego)
- Cathedral of Porto (Sé, Porto)
- Chapel of Ferreiros (Oliveira do Hospital, Oliveira do Hospital)
- Chapel of Nossa Senhora do Agosto (Sé, Porto)
- Chapel of Nossa Senhora da Conceição (São João do Souto, Braga)
- Chapel of Nossa Senhora da Orada (Vila, Melgaço)
- Chapel of São Brás (São Dinis, Vila Real)
- Chapel of São Frutuoso de Montélios (Real, Braga)
- Chapel of São Pedro de Balsemão (Sé, Lamego)
- Chapel of São Trocato (São Trocato, Guimarães)
- Chapel of the Coimbras (São João do Souto, Braga)
- Church of Anjo da Guarda (Ponte de Lima, Ponte de Lima)
- Church of Ansiães (Lavandeira, Cantanhede)
- Church of Barcos (Barcos, Tabuaço)
- Church of Bravães (Bravães, Ponte da Barca)
- Church of Cabeça Santa (Cabeça Santa, Penafiel)
- Church of Castro de Avelãs (Castro de Avelã, Bragança)
- Church of Caminha (Matriz, Caminha)
- Church of Fiães (Fiães, Fiães)
- Church of Fonte Arcada (Fonte Arcada, Póvoa de Lanhoso)
- Church of Freixo de Espada à Cinta (Freixo de Espada à Cinta, Freixo de Espada à Cinta
- Church of Longos Vales (Longos Vales, Monção)
- Church of Manhente (Manhente, Barcelos)
- Church of Miranda (Miranda do Douro, Miranda do Douro
- Church of Miranda do Douro Miranda do Douro, Miranda do Douro)
- Church of Nossa Senhora da Assunção (Torre de Moncorvo, Torre de Moncorvo)
- Church of Nossa Senhora do Cabo (Castelo, Sesimbra)
- Church of Nossa Senhora da Oliveira (Oliveira do Castelo, Guimarães)
- Church of Paderne (Paderne, Fiães)
- Church of Ponte da Barca (Ponte da Barca, Ponte da Barca)
- Church of Santa Clara (Sé, Porto)
- Church of Santa Cruz (Monserrate, Viana do Castelo)
- Church of Santa Maria de Águas Santas (Águas Santas, Maia)
- Church of Santo André Vila Boa de Quires, Marco de Canaveses)
- Church of Santo Tirso (Santo Tirso, Santo Tirso)
- Church of Santiago Maior (Adeganha, Moncorvo
- Church of São Claúdio (Nogueira, Viana do Castelo)
- Church of São Domingos (São Dinis, Vila Real)
- Church of São Fins de Freistas (Freistas, Valença)
- Church of São Francisco (São Nicolau, Porto)
- Church of São Gonçalo (São Gonçalo, Amarante)
- Church of São João Baptista (Cimo de Vila da Castanheira, Chaves)
- Church of São João Baptista (Gatão, Amarante)
- Church of São João Baptista (Ponte da Barca, Ponte da Barca)
- Church of São Lourenço (São Nicolau, Porto)
- Church of São Martinho de Crasto (Crasto, Ponte da Barca)
- Church of São Miguel do Castelo (Oliveira do Castelo, Guimarães)
- Church of São Pedro (Abragão, Penafiel)
- Church of São Pedro de Cete (Cete, Paredes)
- Church of São Pedro de Lourosa (Lourosa, Oliveira do Hospital)
- Church of São Pedro de Roriz (Roriz, Santo Tirso)
- Church of São Pedro de Rubiães (Rubiães, Paredes)
- Church of São Romão de Arões (São Romão, Fafe)
- Church of São Vicente de Sousa (Sousa, Felgueiras)
- Church of Santa Clara (Vila do Conde, Vila do Conde)
- Church of Santa Cristina de Serzedelo (Serzedelo, Guimarães)
- Church of Santa Maria (Azurara, Vila do Conde)
- Church of Santa Maria (Santa Maria de Abade de Neiva, Barcelos)
- Church of Santa Maria (Airães, Felgueiras)
- Church of Santa Maria (Almacave, Lamego)
- Church of Santa Maria (Vila Boa do Bispo, Marco de Canaveses)
- Church of Santa Maria Maior (Santa Maria dos Galegos, Barcelos)
- Church of Santa Maria Maior (Tarouquela, Cinfães)
- Church of Santo Cristo do Outeiro (Outeiro, Bragança)
- Church of São Cristóvão (Rio Mau, Vila do Conde)
- Church of São João Baptista (Vila do Conde, Vila do Conde)
- Church of São Martinho (Penafiel, Penafiel)
- Church of São Martinho de Cedofeita (Cedofeita, Porto)
- Church of São Martinho de Candoso (São Martinho de Candoso, Guimarães)
- Church of São Miguel do Castelo (Oliveira do Castelo, Guimarães
- Church of São Miguel da Eja (Eja, Penafiel)
- Church of São Pedro de Ferreira (Ferreira, Paços de Ferreira)
- Church of São Vicente da Chã (Chã, Montalegre)
- Church of Soalhães (Soalhães, Marco de Canaveses)
- Church of the Carmelites (Glória e Vera Cruz, Aveiro)
- Church of the Clerics (Vitória, Porto)
- Church of Salvador (Freixo de Baixo, Amarante)
- Church of Salvador (Paço de Sousa, Penafiel)
- Church of São Gens de Boelhe (Boelhe, Penafiel)
- Church of Serra do Pilar (Santa Marinha, Vila Nova de Gaia)
- Church of Vila Nova de Foz Côa (Vila Nova de Foz Côa, Vila Nova de Foz Côa)
- Church of Vilar dos Frades (Areias de Vilar, Barcelos)
- Church of Santa Eulália (Santa Eulália de Arnoso, Vila Nova de Famalicão)
- Convent of Santa Maria de Salzedas (Salzedas, Tarouca)
- Convent of Santo António (Glória e Vera Cruz, Aveiro)
- Convent of São Bento (Vitória, Porto)
- Convent of São João (São João da Tarouca, Tarouca)
- Cross of Campo das Hortas (Sé, Braga)
- Cross of Castelo Branco (Castelo Branco, Castelo Branco)
- Cross of Leça do Bailio (Leça do Bailo, Matosinhos)
- Cross of Nossa Senhora da Glória (Glória e Vera Cruz, Aveiro)
- Cross of Nossa Senhora da Guia (Oliveira do Castelo, Guimarães)
- Cross of Pinheiro da Bemposta (Pinheiro da Bemposta, Oliveira de Azeméis)
- Cross of São Gregório (Cristoval, Fiães)
- Cross of São João do Campo (Campo do Gerês, Terras de Bouro)
- Cross of São Julião (Vila, Melgaço)
- Cross of Tibães (Mire de Tibães), Braga)
- Cross of Valongo (Valongo, Valongo)
- Episcopal Palace of Castelo Branco (Castelo Branco, Castelo Branco)
- Funeral Monument of Sobrado (Sobrado, Castelo de Paiva)
- Misericórdia of Viana do Castelo (Santa Maria Maior, Viana do Castelo)
- Monsatery of Ermelo (Ermelo, Arcos de Valdevez)
- Monastery of Grijó (Grijó, Vila Nova de Gaia)
- Monastery of Jesus (Glória e Vera Cruz, Aveiro)
- Monastery of Leça do Bailio (Leça do Bailo, Matosinhos)
- Monastery of Santa Maria de Pombeiro (Pombeiro de Rivavizela, Felgueiras)
- Monastery of Santo André de Rendufe (Rendulfe, Amares)
- Monastery of Santa Maria das Júnias (Pitões das Júnias, Montalegre)
- Monastery of São Martinho de Tibães (Mire de Tibães, Braga)
- Monastery of Travanca (Travanca, Santa Maria da Feira)
- Monastery of Rates (Rates, Póvoa de Varzim)
- Monument of Aplendurada (Aplendurada e Matos, Marco de Canaveses)
- Monument of the Hermitage (Irivo, Penafiel)
- Tomb of D. Rodrigo Sancho (Grijó, Vila Nova de Gaia)
- Tomb of Monte de São Roque (Penafiel, Penafiel)
