= Igreja Paroquial de Santo Aleixo da Restauração =

Church in Moura Municipality, Portugal

Coordinates: 38.0682°N 7.1527°W

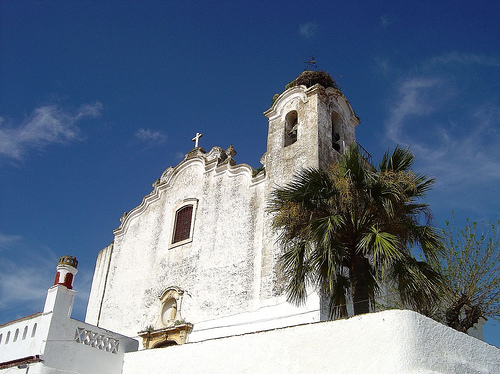
Igreja Paroquial de Santo Aleixo da Restauração

Igreja Paroquial de Santo Aleixo da Restauração is a church in Portugal. It is classified as a National Monument.
