= Castle of Cola =

National Monument in Portugal

- Castelo de Cola
- Beja, Baixo Alentejo, Alentejo in Portugal

Site information
- Type: Castle
- Owner: Portuguese Republic
- Operator: DRCAlentejo (Portaria 829/2009; DR, Série II, 163, 24 August 2009)
- Open to the public: Public

Location
- Coordinates: 37°34′43.51″N 8°18′1.69″W

Site history
- Built: Bronze Age
- Materials: Masonry, Schist

Castle of Cola (Portuguese: Castelo de Cola) is an Iron Age residence and Islamic redoubt in the Portuguese Alentejo, classified as a National Monument. The castro is part of a larger archaeological park of Castro da Cola, that includes various Megalithic and Chalcolithic monuments, including necropolises of the Bronze and Iron Ages. The Castro-era polygonal plan, included reinforced blocks, with an entrance controlled by tower. The remaining defensive structure was circled by walls, with still exist, on the neighboring pasture-lands protecting the castle.

== History ==
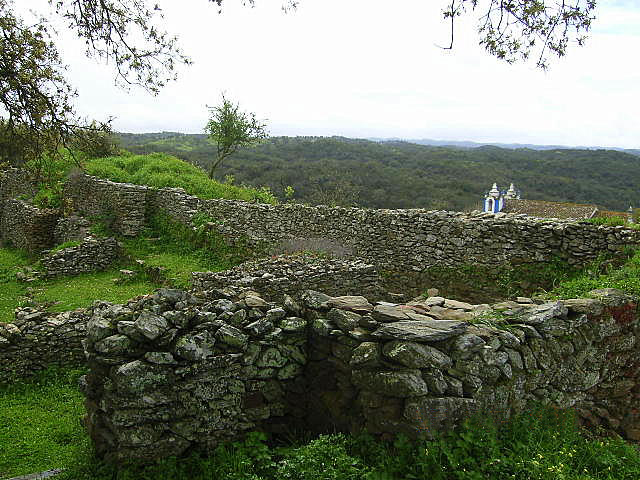
Fortified medieval settlement of Cola, a castro later converted to Islamic outpost

The construction of the ancient occurred, and human occupation fixed itself on this site, around the beginning of the Bronze Age.

During the period of Islamic influence within the Iberian peninsula, the castro was reinforced to serve as an outpost. The fortification controlled one of the principal routes of passage into the Algarve. Of the artifacts discovered there are objects dating to the pre- and proto-cultural episodes of the region, including: polished stone axes, fragments of Iron Age vessels, rural ceramics, glass beads, gold, needle bone, bronze bracelets, drills, firing pins, spheroids; historical objects: Roman-Visigoth ceramics, Arabic and Portuguese Medieval metal objects (screws, cossoiros, buckles, keys, rings, etc.), stone objects (millstones, spheroids throwing, firing pins), hewn Roman and Visigothic stones, Arab tombstones, coins, Roman lamps.

The site was abandoned during the 14th century, based on the research of Abel Viana. Yet, this is contradicted by Rosa Varela Gomes, who suggests that the abandonment occurred sometime in the 15th or 16th centuries.

Excavations on the site were realized in 1960, under the direction of Abel Viana. During this period the walls of the southeast corner were consolidated (1961) Further investigations and reinforcement of the northern parts of the castle were accomplished in 1962, followed once again in 1963 by work completed by Abel Viana.

In 1999, it was included within the Programa de Valorização e Divulgação Turística (Tourist Valorization and Appreciation Program), by the Ministry of Commerce and Tourism and Secretary of State for Culture, and included as part of the archaeological itineraries for the Alentejo and Algarve regions. In order to improve tourist visits, a new interpretative center and reception area was constructed between 1999 and 2000, by architect Sofia Salema.

In 2001, archaeological excavations were carried out on the site.

== Architecture ==
The castro is located in a rural environment, on the crest of a mountain 201 metres (659 ft) above the river valley, along the Ribeira do Marchicão and near the Rio Mira. The landscape, which is 70 metres (230 ft) above the Rio Mira, is protected by walls of the fortification to the southwest and northeast. Near the site is the Church of Nossa Senhora da Cola, an annual destination for pilgrims. Cola is part of an archaeological circuit that covers an area of 15 kilometres (9.3 mi), part of 23 stations from the Neolithic and Middle Ages, including the Chalcolithic settlement of Cortadouro, the Megalithic monuments of Fernão Vaz I and II, as well as the Tholos da Nora Velha, the necropolises of Porto de Lages, Pego da Sobreira, Fernão Vaz and Vaga da Cascalheira.

The plan of the castle consists of an irregular 125 metres (410 ft)-long polygon, with 60 metres (200 ft) width, consisting of 2.4 metres (7.9 ft) thick walls, although in some areas this width was between 5–6 metres (16–20 ft). These walls were reinforced by unequal-sized rectangular blocks.

A main gate is located on the south wall, defended by a large tower, of thicker construction.

A thick wall divides the courtyard into two zones to the south. Here a cistern, dug from the rock, 3.79×2.70×2.20 metres (12.4×8.9×7.2 ft), is located, with semi-circular vaulted ceiling and square nozzole.

The floor within the castle consists of a mixture of sand, gravel and pebbles, with vestiges of rectangular houses located in various locations.
