= Castle of Alvito =

Medieval castle in Portugal

Coordinates: 41°18′04″N 8°37′02″W

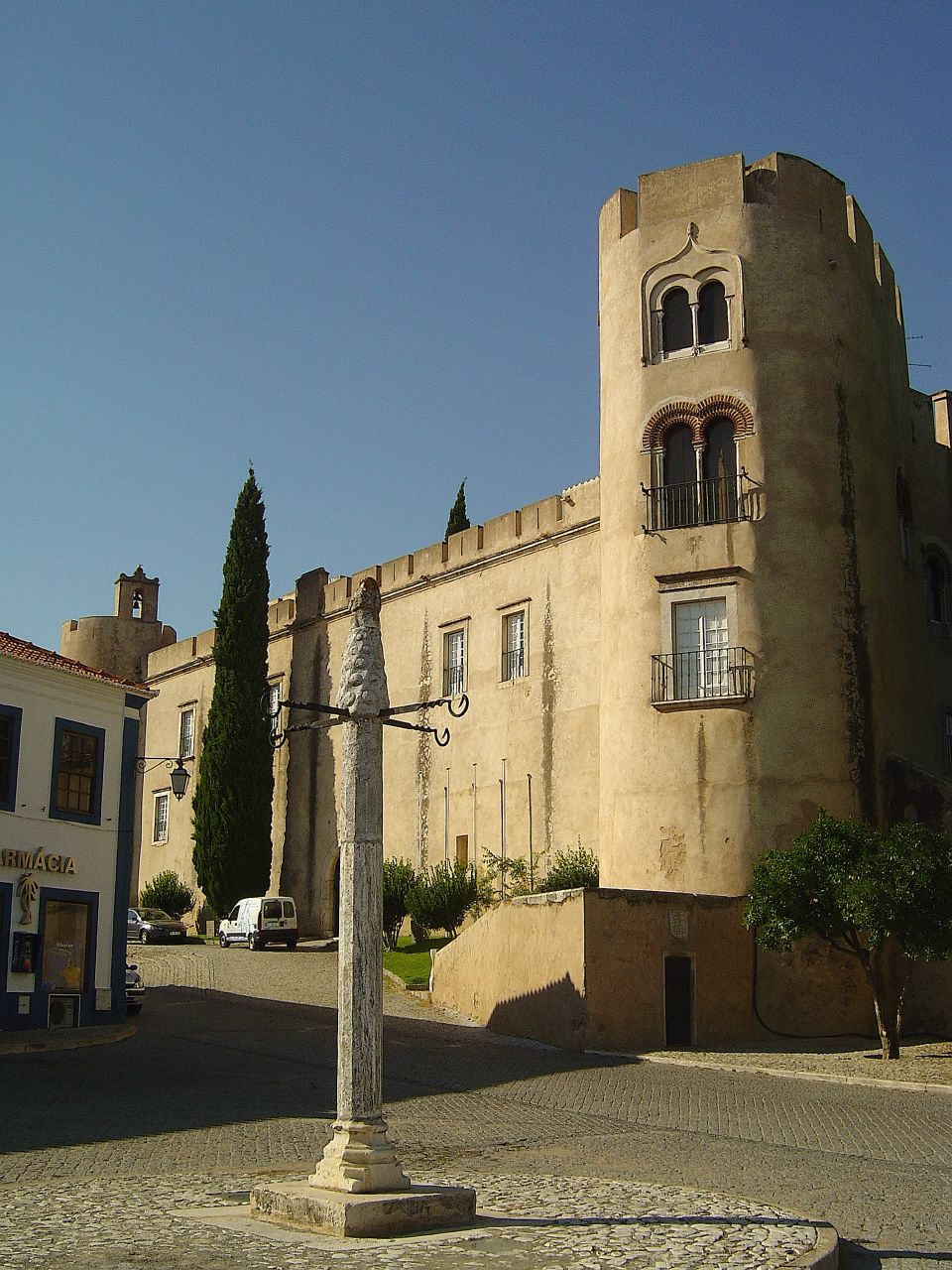
Castle of Alvito.

Castle of Alvito (Portuguese: Castelo de Alvito) is a medieval castle in the civil parish in Alvito, municipality of Alvito, the Portuguese district of Beja.

It is classified as a National Monument.
