= Igreja Matriz de Santiago do Cacém =

Coordinates: 38.0139°N 8.6978°W

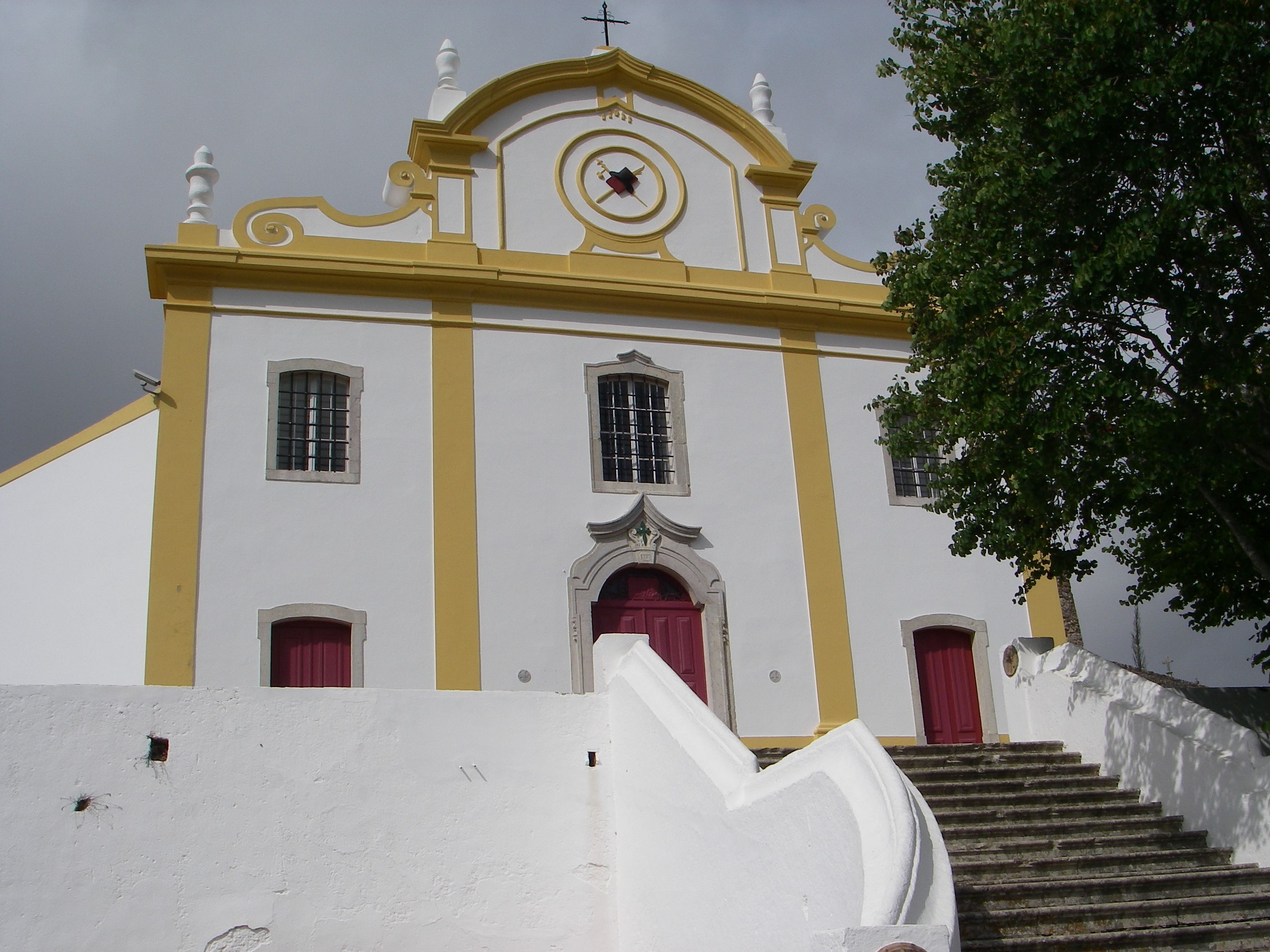
Igreja Matriz de Santiago do Cacém

The Igreja Matriz de Santiago do Cacém ([sɐ̃ˈtjaɣu ðu kɐˈsɐ̃j]; Mother Church of Santiago do Cacém) is a 13th century church, of the invocation of Santiago Maior, located in the town of Santiago do Cacém, Portugal.

== History ==
The church, attached to the castle of Santiago do Cacém, was founded in the 13th century by the Order of Santiago. It has undergone several reconstructions over the years. The ogival side portico, in Roman Gothic style, has capitals with zoomorphic decorations, the vaulted high choir and the high relief with the representation of St. James.

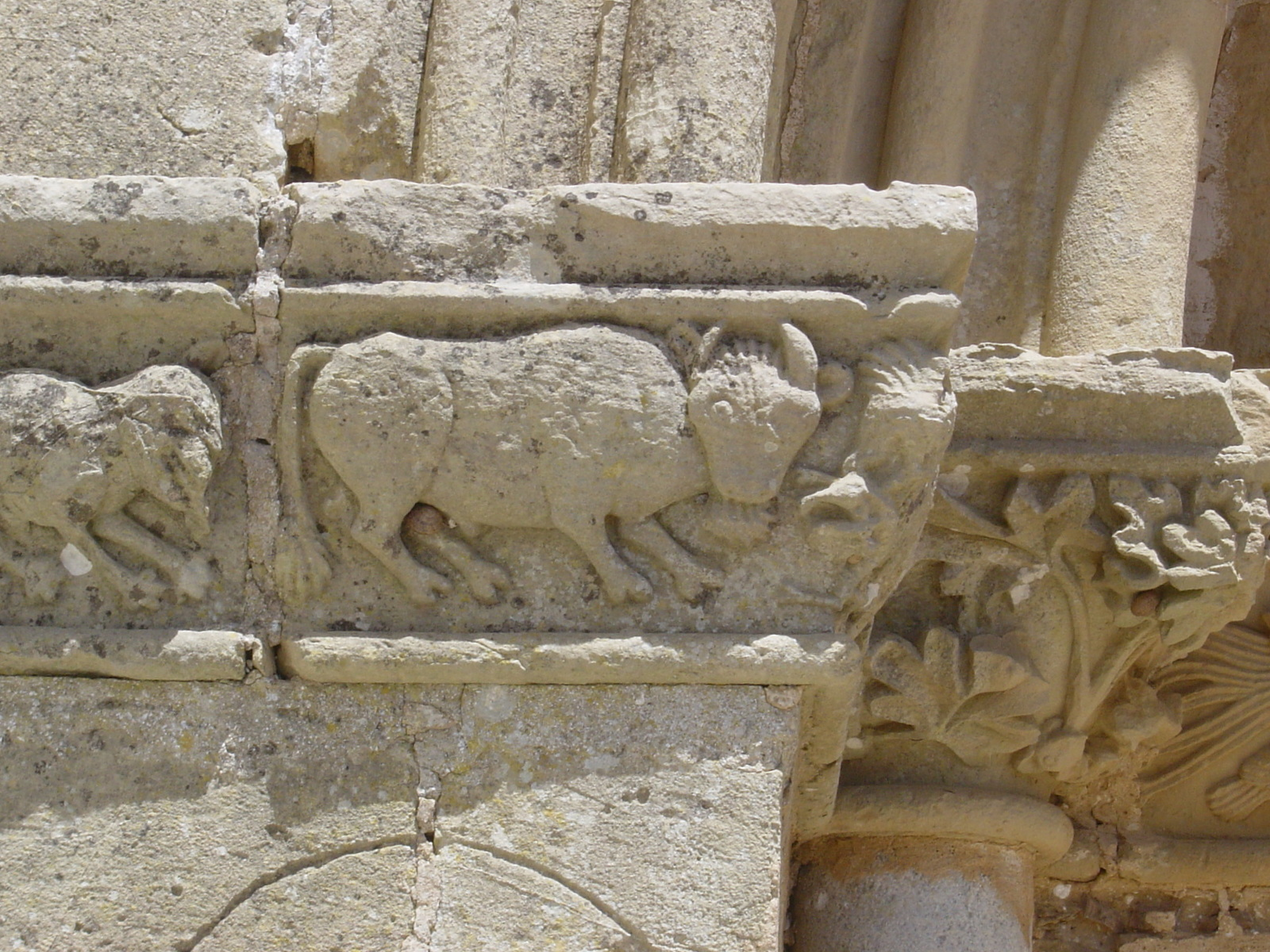
An ornament on the side door of the church

== Recovery ==
Without permanent worship, the church was saved from ruin by the Department of Historical and Artistic Heritage of the Diocese of Beja. They promoted a vast campaign of rehabilitation works, carried out with the collaboration of the Directorate General of National Buildings and Monuments (1993-1996), and then ensured its maintenance and regular opening to the public, under the patronage of a Safeguarding Commission, founded in 1993, which acts in cooperation with the municipality.

It is part of the Network of Museums of the Diocese of Beja.

== Classification ==
The church is classified as a national monument.

== Tesouro da Colegiada de Santiago ==
The church houses the Tesouro da Colegiada de Santiago, the core of the Museum of Sacred Art de Santiago do Cacém, founded in 2002.

== Bibliography ==
- FALCÃO, José António (dir.). Entre o Céu e a Terra: Arte Sacra da Diocese de Beja (Catálogo da exposição). 3 vols., Beja : Departamento do Património Histórico e Artístico da Diocese de Beja, 2000 ISBN 972-8354-04-5
