= Castle of Castelo de Vide =

Castle in Portalegre District, Portugal

Coordinates: 39°25′03″N 7°27′28″W

The Castle of Castelo Vide (Portuguese: Castelo de Castelo de Vide) is a medieval castle in the civil parish of Santa Maria da Devassa, municipality of Castelo de Vide, Portuguese district of Portalegre.

It is classified as a National Monument.
