= Barcelos (parish) =

- Civil parish
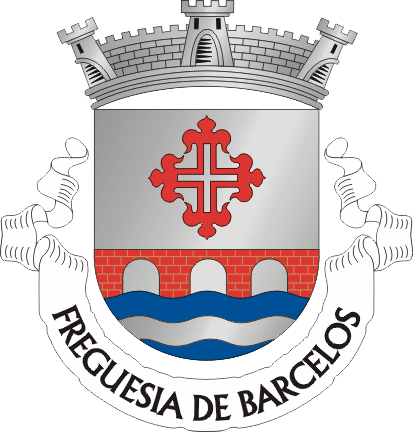
- Coat of arms

- Location in Portugal
- Coordinates: 41.535°N 8.615°W
- Country: Portugal
- Region: Norte
- Intermunic. comm.: Cávado
- District: Braga
- Municipality: Barcelos
- Disbanded: 2013

Area
  - Total: 1.30 km^{2} (0.50 sq mi)

Population (2011)
  - Total: 4,660
  - Density: 3,600/km^{2} (9,300/sq mi)
- Time zone: UTC+00:00 (WET)
  - Summer (DST): UTC+01:00 (WEST)

Barcelos is a former civil parish, located in the municipality of Barcelos, Portugal. In 2013, the parish merged into the new parish Barcelos, Vila Boa e Vila Frescainha (São Martinho e São Pedro). The population in 2011 was 4,660, in an area of 1.30 km².
