= Ponte da Barca, Vila Nova da Muía e Paço Vedro de Magalhães =

- Civil parish
- Location in Portugal
- Coordinates: 41.807°N 8.417°W
- Country: Portugal
- Region: Norte
- Intermunic. comm.: Alto Minho
- District: Viana do Castelo
- Municipality: Ponte da Barca

Area
  - Total: 8.84 km^{2} (3.41 sq mi)

Population (2011)
  - Total: 4,372
  - Density: 490/km^{2} (1,300/sq mi)
- Time zone: UTC+00:00 (WET)
  - Summer (DST): UTC+01:00 (WEST)

Ponte da Barca, Vila Nova da Muía e Paço Vedro de Magalhães is a parish in Ponte da Barca Municipality, Viana do Castelo District, Minho-Lima Subregion, Norte Region, Portugal. It was formed in 2013 by the merger of the former parishes Ponte da Barca, Vila Nova da Muía and Paço Vedro de Magalhães. The population in 2011 was 4,372, in an area of 8.84 km^{2}.
