= Afonso Henriques Theatre =

Former theatre in Guimarães, Portugal

- Teatro Dom Afonso Henriques
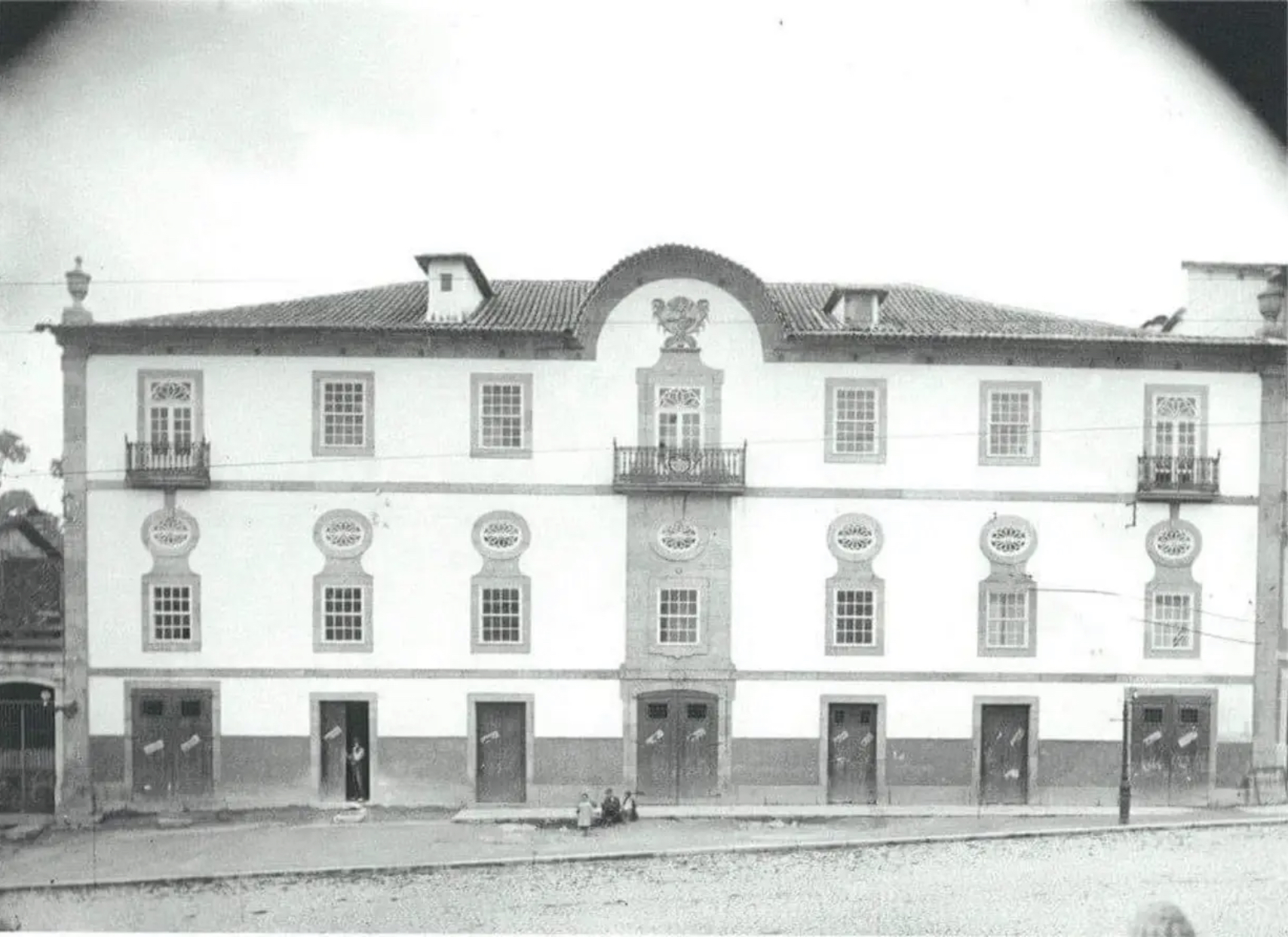
- The Afonso Henriques Theatre, c. 1910
- Interactive map of the Afonso Henriques Theatre area
- Former names: Theatro Dom Affonso Henriques
- Alternative names: Teatro Vimaranense, Vimaranes-Cine, Cinema High Life

General information
- Status: Demolished
- Type: Theatre, cinema
- Architectural style: Baroque
- Location: Campo da Feira, Guimarães, Portugal
- Coordinates: 41.44192°N 8.29181°W
- Year built: 1853-1855
- Construction started: 1853
- Completed: 1855
- Inaugurated: 12 August 1855; 170 years ago
- Closed: August 1938
- Demolished: Sometime between 1943 and 1949

Technical details
- Floor count: 3
- Lifts/elevators: 0

The Afonso Henriques Theatre (or Dom Afonso Henriques Theatre; Portuguese: Teatro Dom Afonso Henriques), was the main entertainment center of Guimarães from 1853 until its replacement by the Jordão Theatre in the late 1930s.

Over its 90-plus years, the Afonso Henriques Theatre was the central venue for entertainment in Guimarães, hosting a wide variety of performances that fulfilled the cultural needs of the city. It remained the focal point for the city's events, including festivities and important community gatherings, until its successor was constructed in 1937. Its performances and shows influenced the development of the surrounding area, mainly by partly aiding the construction of the Santos Passos Church.

== Description ==
The building's facade was symmetrical and featured three stories. The ground floor consisted of a series of rectangular doorways, seven in total, each with a simple stone frame. The central doorway was more prominent as it featured a double-stone frame with a curved top.

On the first floor, the central section had a square window surrounded by a strip of granite. Flanking this central section were three pairs of windows, each set within a granite frame. On top of them were small circular windows with a granite frame which connected with the square windows below.

The second floor mirrored the first in its window arrangement, with rectangular windows above each of the lower floors. The central section had a balcony with an iron railing, supported by corbels and accessed by a door with a decorative stone frame. The outermost windows on this floor also featured iron railings and granite balconies. The roof was paved with roof tiles and it was separated from the facade by a cornice with two stone urns at its extremities. The central part was shaped like a semi-circle and it had a stone coat of arms under it.

In its interior the theatre had two closed cabinets, 38 boxes in three levels, 176 audience seats and 60 gallery seats.

== History ==
=== Predecessors ===
Before the construction of the theatre, the Count of Vila Pouca Theatre was located at the Campo da Feira. Shows and plays were performed regularly at this theatre to aid the construction efforts of the Santos Passos Church while under construction.

The Count of Vila Pouca Theatre was destroyed in an act of arson on the night of 18 January 1841, leaving Guimarães without a permanent theatre. Even during its years of operation, the theatre had never been intended to serve the city’s growing population of roughly 7,000 residents at the time. Since at least 1836, the progressive circles of Guimarães had been advocating for a new theatre capable of meeting the cultural needs of an rapidly expanding urban community.

=== Construction and inauguration ===
In 1853, construction of a new theatre started at the Campo da Feira after 12 years without a permanent theatre in the city. During its construction on 5 July 1854, five people died after an accident involving the collapse of the scaffolding. On 31 May 1855, it was reported the construction of the theatre was being accelerated so its inauguration could occur on the night of the succession of King Pedro V.

This theatre was inaugurated with a masquerade ball on 12 August 1855, and was baptized with the name of Portugal's first king, Afonso Henriques, making official the name Theatro Dom Affonso Henriques, later modified due to various orthographic reforms.

=== Active years ===
The theatre, similar to its predecessor, also contributed to the completion of the Santos Passos Church by donating funds received from plays and magic lantern slide shows. On 22 April 1863, the play "O Veterano Mateus", the song "O Sebastianista", and the comedy "A Actriz" were played exclusively to raise money for the construction of the church's bell towers. Many were in attendance and the city's music played outside the theatre.

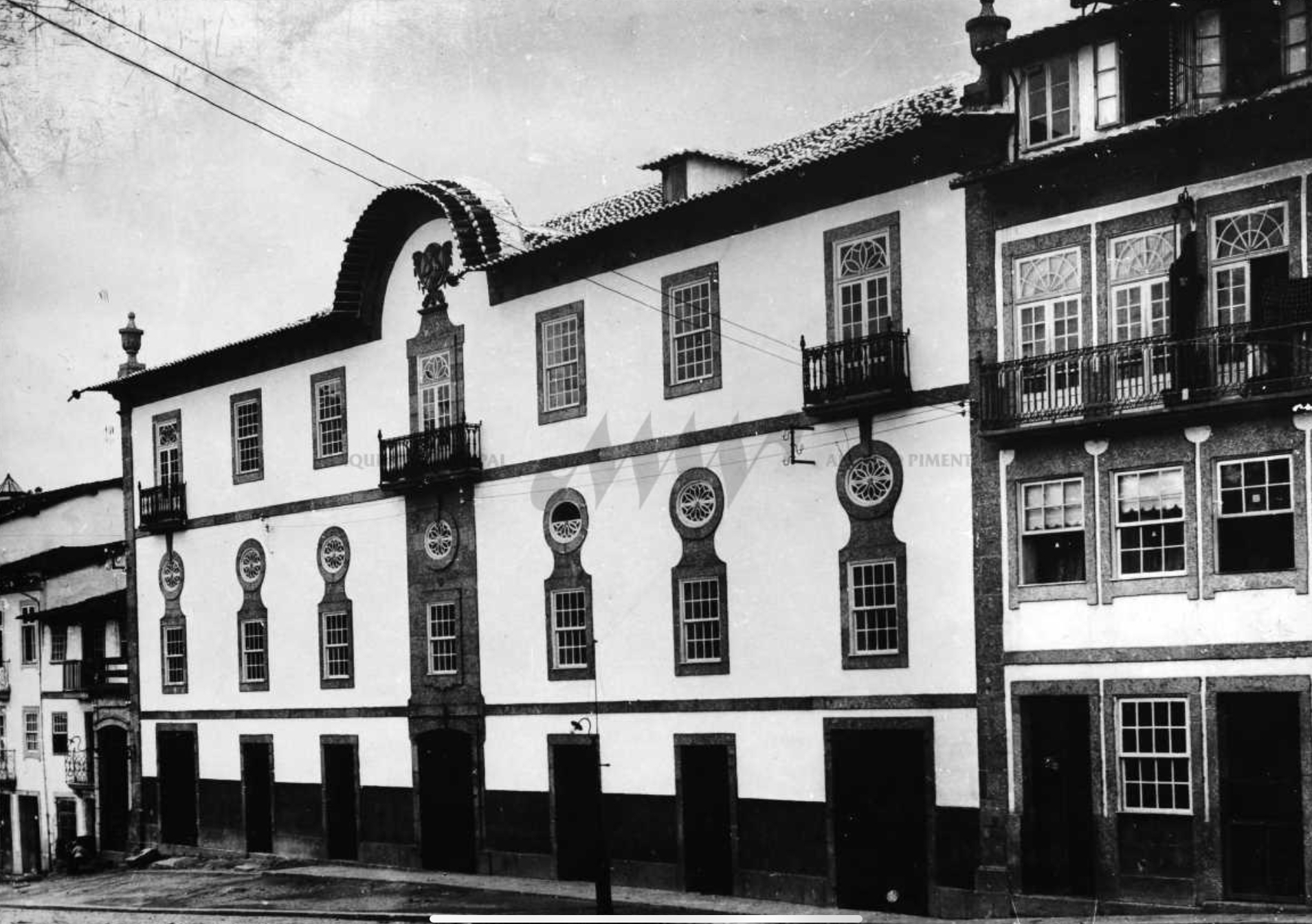
The Afonso Henriques Theatre in 1912

The first 10 years of activity of the Afonso Henriques Theatre were very busy, with over 220 theatrical performances by national theatre companies. Compared with other two big cities at the time, Coimbra and Aveiro, Guimarães was the city, between these three, which welcomed the most professional theatre companies to its theatres. This was unexpected as both Coimbra and Aveiro had multiple theatrical locations, while Guimarães only had the Afonso Henriques Theatre.

On 26 February 1866, the Artistic Association of Guimarães was installed at the Afonso Henriques Theatre and remained there until their headquarters were transferred to the Gil Vicente Theatre a few decades later.

Periodic inspections were regularly conducted at the theatre, as documented in a logbook which recorded events from 2 August 1856 to 30 June 1875. This logbook revealed the theatre was frequently rented for a variety of events, including theatrical shows, masquerade balls, and both dramatic and comedic plays. It also revealed the number of events held decreased throughout the years.

By order of the administrative authority, the theatre was inspected on 11 April 1888, with nothing unusual to report. The theatre was the gathering place of the NFC and spectators of the Pregão, one of the festivities of the Nicolinas, once it was concluded. The Afonso Henriques Theatre was also the place where students gathered on 21 November 1895 to revive the Nicolinas festivities after decades of non-existence.

In Guimarães, the first permanent cinematographic screening room was opened in March 1909, on the premises of the theatre. Later, in January 1912, the company which owned the cinematic equipment and screening room at the Gil Vicente Theatre relocated to the theatre, evolving in 1914 to the "Cinema High-Life". In November 1919, businessman Luís do Souto converted the old theatre into a fully functioning cinema, named “Vimaranes-Cine,” replacing the “Cinema High-Life” despite the already deteriorating conditions of the building.

Famous performers of the time such as Abel Augusto da Costa, Emília Cândida, José Carlos dos Santos, Emília das Neves, Actor Taborda and Gertrudes Rita da Silva performed here in more than one occasion.

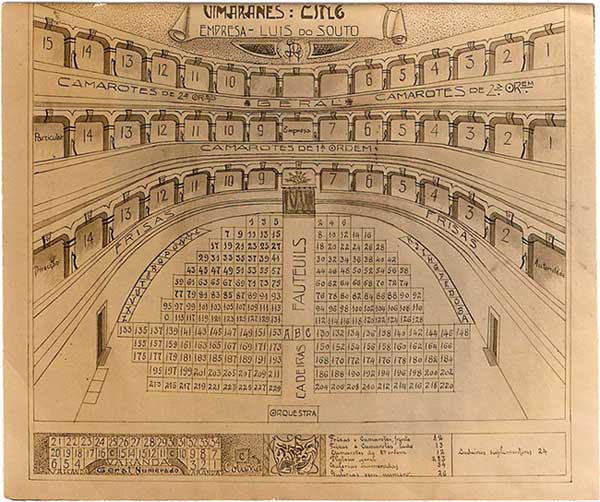
Interior of the theatre after being converted into a cinema, around 1919

=== Closure, demolition, and aftermath ===
On 6 May 1933, the Diário do Governo published decree n°22:498, issued by the Ministry of Internal Administration. This decree authorized the City Council of Guimarães to expropriate the Afonso Henriques Theatre due to its risk of ruin, as the company responsible for it had refused to carry out the necessary repairs. The demolition was deemed indispensable not only for this reason but also to allow the extension of S. Dâmaso Street toward the Campo da Feira. The works were to commence as soon as the theatre was handed over to the City Council and were mandated to be completed within six months of their start.

During a council session on 18 October 1934, it was reported that the electrical installation and water distribution project for the Afonso Henriques Theatre, presented by Engineer Henrique d’Eça, was ready to move forward. Two days later, the proposal received official approval. However, on 25 October 1934, the Mayor submitted a formal request to the Minister of Internal Administration, seeking approval for the now proposed reconstruction of the building to “adapt it into a concert hall in line with the aspirations of all the citizens of Guimarães”, since a study recommended that it would be preferable if the theatre was reconstructed instead of the demolition ordered in the 1933 decree.

On 18 February 1936, the City Council met in extraordinary session to address the persistent lack of an adequate theatre in the city. The original plan to preserve the existing building was reconsidered, particularly since the street extension authorised by the 1933 decree had never been constructed. The meeting ended without a definitive solution, and soon afterwards rumours spread that plans for reconstructing the old theatre had stalled. The possibility of closing the theatre, largely due to its deteriorating condition, resurfaced. Concerns about its structural integrity could be traced back at least to 1919, when it was described in the following terms:

Guimarães has a theatre like all the lands, a theatre named after Afonso Henriques.

However, this slum offers no guarantees against disaster. Besides the fact that it has nothing, absolutely nothing, that should be required in a theatre, it currently has the serious inconvenience of not having a single wooden plank that hasn't shown signs of old age.

The whole place is rotten. One day it'll all fall down and poor of those that witness such spectacle.

— Gil Vicente, n.º 057, of 9 November 1919, Martins Sarmento Society Archive

The theatre finally ceased all activities and was closed in 1936, however, in September of the same year, it was temporarily repurposed to house families whose homes were going to be demolished on a project to restore the area in and around the Castle of Guimarães and the Paço dos Duques, and could not afford to buy a new one. After many complaints, the families were promised by the city council to be moved to a different location before the start of the Gualterianas of 1938.

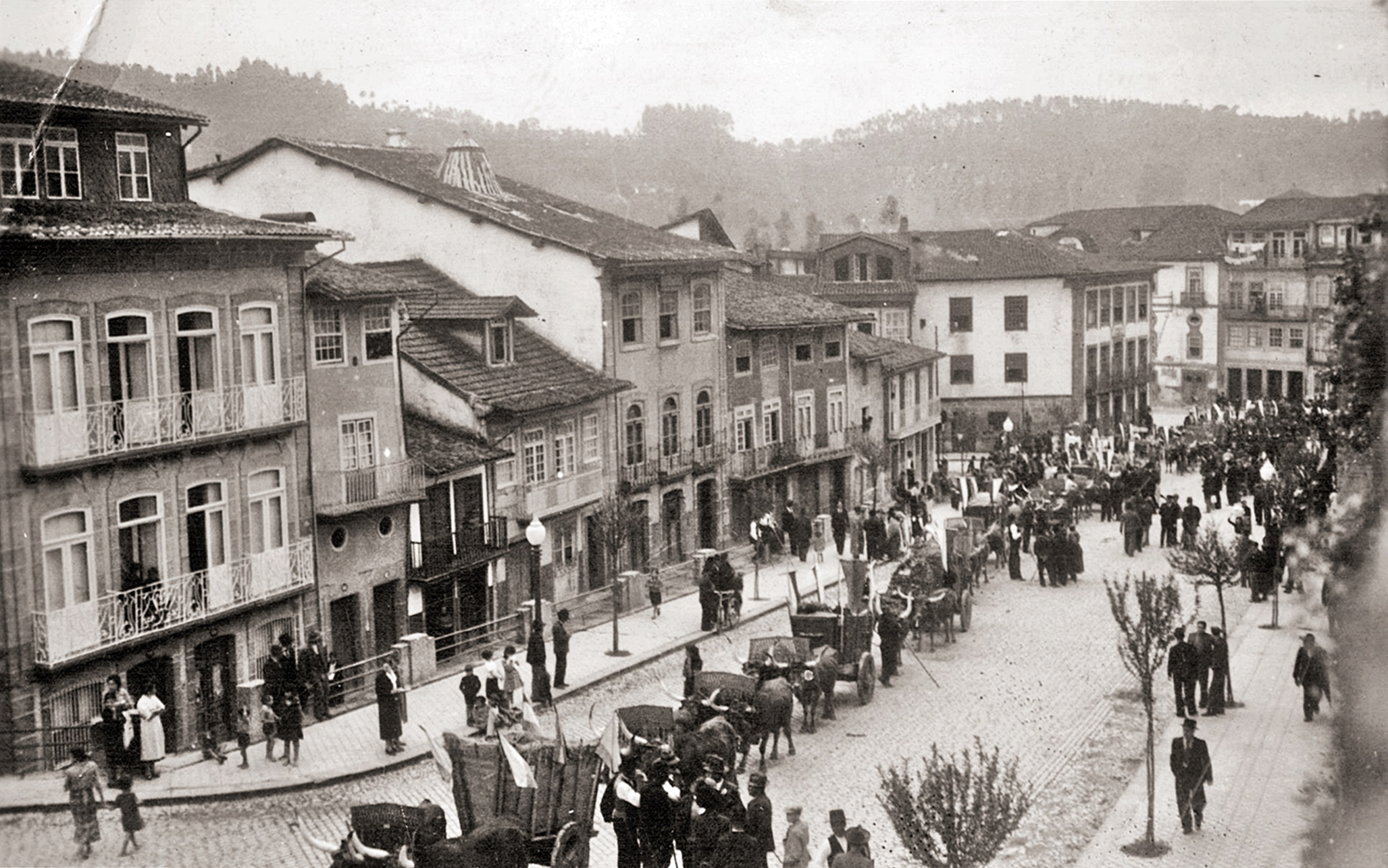
Last photograph of the Afonso Henriques Theatre (partially seen on the right), 30 October 1943.

On 29 July 1938, it was announced at the O Comércio de Guimarães that the theatre had become a "shameful inn", and would be indefinitely closed after the relocation of said families. In August of the same year, after almost two years of serving as a shelter to these families, the theatre permanently closed, and plans to reconstruct it were completely discarded as the construction of its announced successor, the Jordão Theatre, had already begun in February 1937.

In 1942, the City Council held a public auction to sell the Afonso Henriques Theatre building and its surrounding plot.

The theatre was demolished sometime between 1943 and 1949, with its last appearance being in a photograph from 30 October 1943. By 1949, three houses had already been built on the site, which were later demolished in early 1961, alongside many other buildings, including the São Dâmaso Church, on a project to widen the São Dâmaso Boulevard. The location of the theatre is currently occupied by a street, sidewalks and part of the São Dâmaso garden.

== See also ==
- Jordão Theatre
- Campo da Feira
- Cinema of Portugal
