= Jordão Theatre =

Theatre in Guimarães, Portugal

- Teatro Jordão
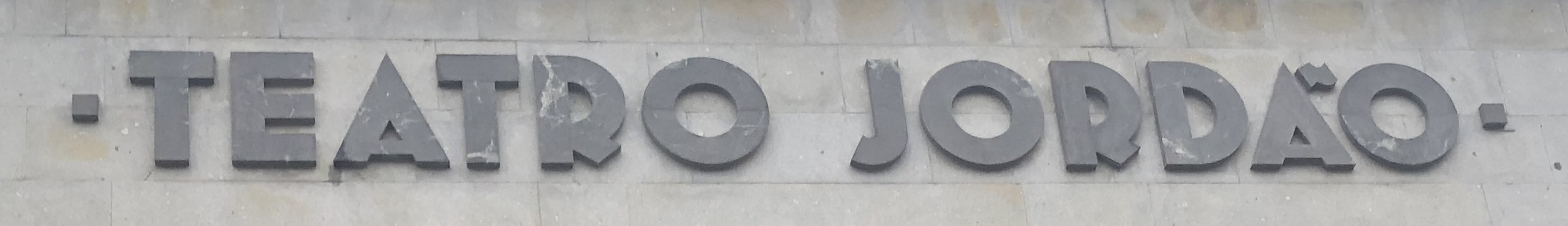

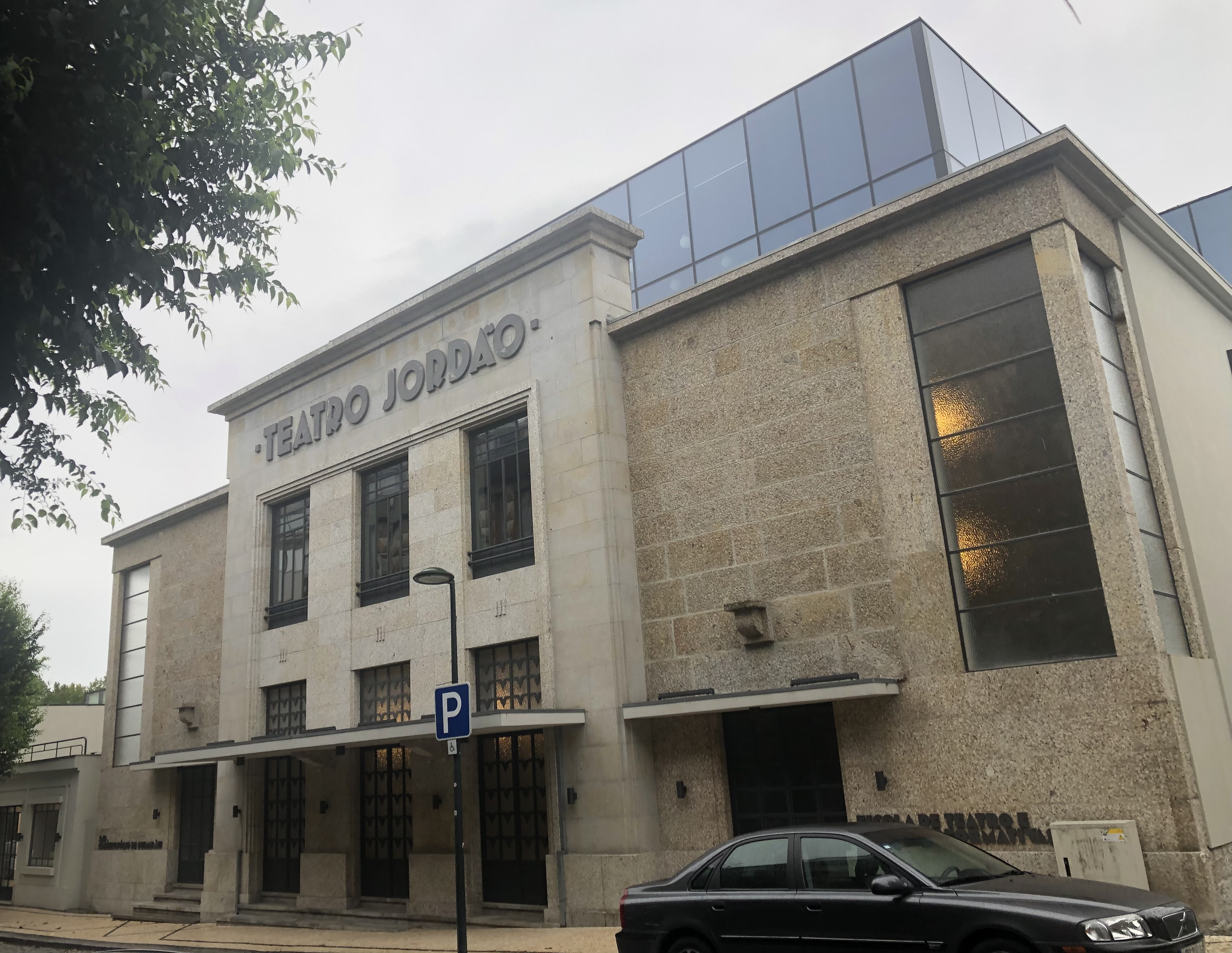
- The Jordão Theatre in 2023
- Interactive map of the Jordão Theatre area
- Former names: Martins Sarmento Theatre

General information
- Type: Theatre, Cinema, Artistic School
- Architectural style: Art Deco
- Location: Urgezes, Guimarães, Portugal
- Coordinates: 41.43890°N 8.29529°W
- Construction started: 22 February 1937
- Inaugurated: 20 November 1938; 87 years ago
- Renovated: 12 February 2022; 4 years ago
- Closed: 1993 (reopened in 2022)

Design and construction
- Architect: Júlio José de Brito
- Architecture firm: SIMCO, Lda.
- Developer: Bernardino Jordão
- Awards: National Real Estate Award, 2023

Other information
- Seating capacity: 1,200 spectators, 400 seats

Website
- www.viralagenda.com/pt/p/v-TeatroJordao

The Jordão Theatre (Portuguese: Teatro Jordão) was inaugurated in the city of Guimarães on 20 November 1938, with the official name of Martins Sarmento Theatre, due to a political decision communicated days before its opening. It was the initiative of businessman Bernardino Jordão (1868-1940), concessionaire for electricity in Guimarães, who entrusted the project and construction management to architect and civil engineer Júlio José de Brito (1896-1965), whose best-known work is the Rivoli Theatre in Porto.

== History ==
=== Background ===
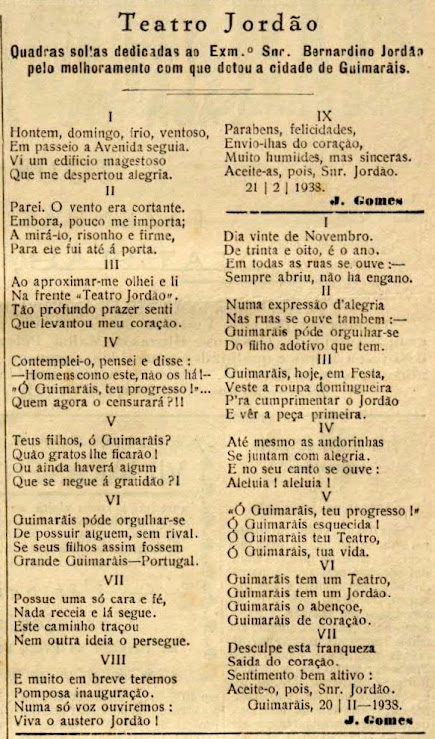
A series of quatrains thanking Bernardino Jordão for building the Jordão Theatre in the O Comércio de Guimarães newspaper in 1938

This theatre was born out of the need to provide Guimarães with a decent concert hall, as the Guimarães Propaganda and Defence Society had already demanded in 1929. At the time, only two concert halls existed in Guimarães, the Gil Vicente Theatre, at the time closed due to legal disputes over its ownership, and the Afonso Henriques Theatre, built in 1855 but closed in February 1930 after many years of lack of maintenance and decaying infrastructure.

On 1 January 1937, Bernardino Jordão confirmed to the newspaper O Comércio de Guimarães his intentions to build a new theatre: "I'm going to build the (so demanded) theatre and I expect it to be up and running by next summer." He also said that an architect had started work, looking at various possible sites for the much-desired building, which would have the conditions to host theatre and film shows.

==== Gil Vicente Theatre ====
The legal dispute between the tenants and owners of the Gil Vicente Theatre on 25 July 1935 led to the temporary closure of the city's only proper cinema/theatre, a situation that lasted for the next 18 months. In the meantime, cinema-goers in Guimarães had to look outside the city.

==== Afonso Henriques Theatre ====
The Afonso Henriques Theatre, opened in 1855, closed in 1936. On 18 February of that same year, the Guimarães City Council met in extraordinary session to decide on the construction of a new theatre. The idea was to rebuild the Afonso Henriques Theatre, which was still standing because the street provided for in the 1933 decree had not been torn up. No solution to the problem emerged from this meeting, as rumors soon began to circulate that the reconstruction of the old theatre was stuck.

=== Construction ===
Its construction was carried out by the company "SIMCO, Lda." and began on 22 February 1937, on the then Cândido dos Reis Avenue, modern D. Afonso Henriques Avenue, and was "grandiose" for the time, as can be seen from the following data published in the programme distributed at the time of its inauguration:

"To give a small idea of this work, the following data is presented: 979 lorries of sand and gravel were spent, among other materials; 684 lorries of brick and masonry; 62 wagons of cement, lime, plaster and marble; 13 wagons with 127,000 kilos of iron; 31,000 or nearly 30 wagons of "SIMCO" bricks spent for the pavements. The pine trees used in the work alone add up to enough length to make a dual carriageway from the Toural to the Penha Sanctuary. The planks and props used for the formwork and flooring would be enough to cover the entire Toural Square with a height of 20 metres. If we were to load a train with all the material spent on this work, we would have a total of 835 wagons, excluding the machine and the tender, or a total length of 9.2 kilometres, i.e. a distance equal to that from the Guimarães train station to Vizela. With the 926 lamps totalling 46,000 watts used for lighting, and spaced 10 metres apart, we could light this entire line."

=== Inauguration ===
The Jordão Theatre was inaugurated on 20 November 1938, with a capacity of more than 1,200 spectators. It had many original functions, one of them being a movie theatre.

In the meantime, the name Martins Sarmento Theatre lasted until December 1940, when the Minister of National Education authorised the use of the name Jordão Theatre, after Bernardino Jordão's death on 23 May 1940.

=== Closure ===
The Jordão Theatre closed at the end of December 1993 and in August 2010 Guimarães City Council bought the building from the Jordão family for 2.2 million euros.

=== Restoration and reopening ===
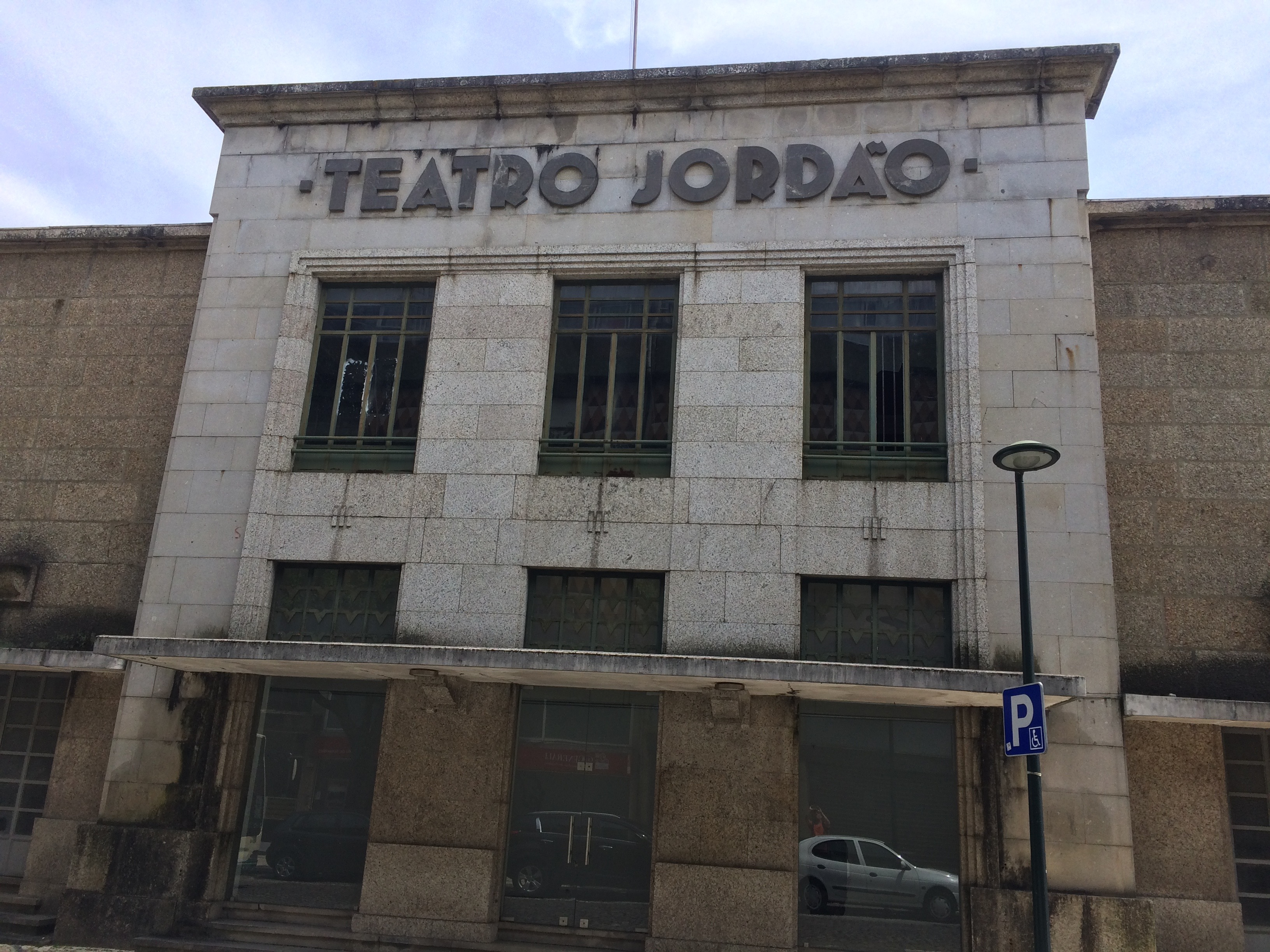
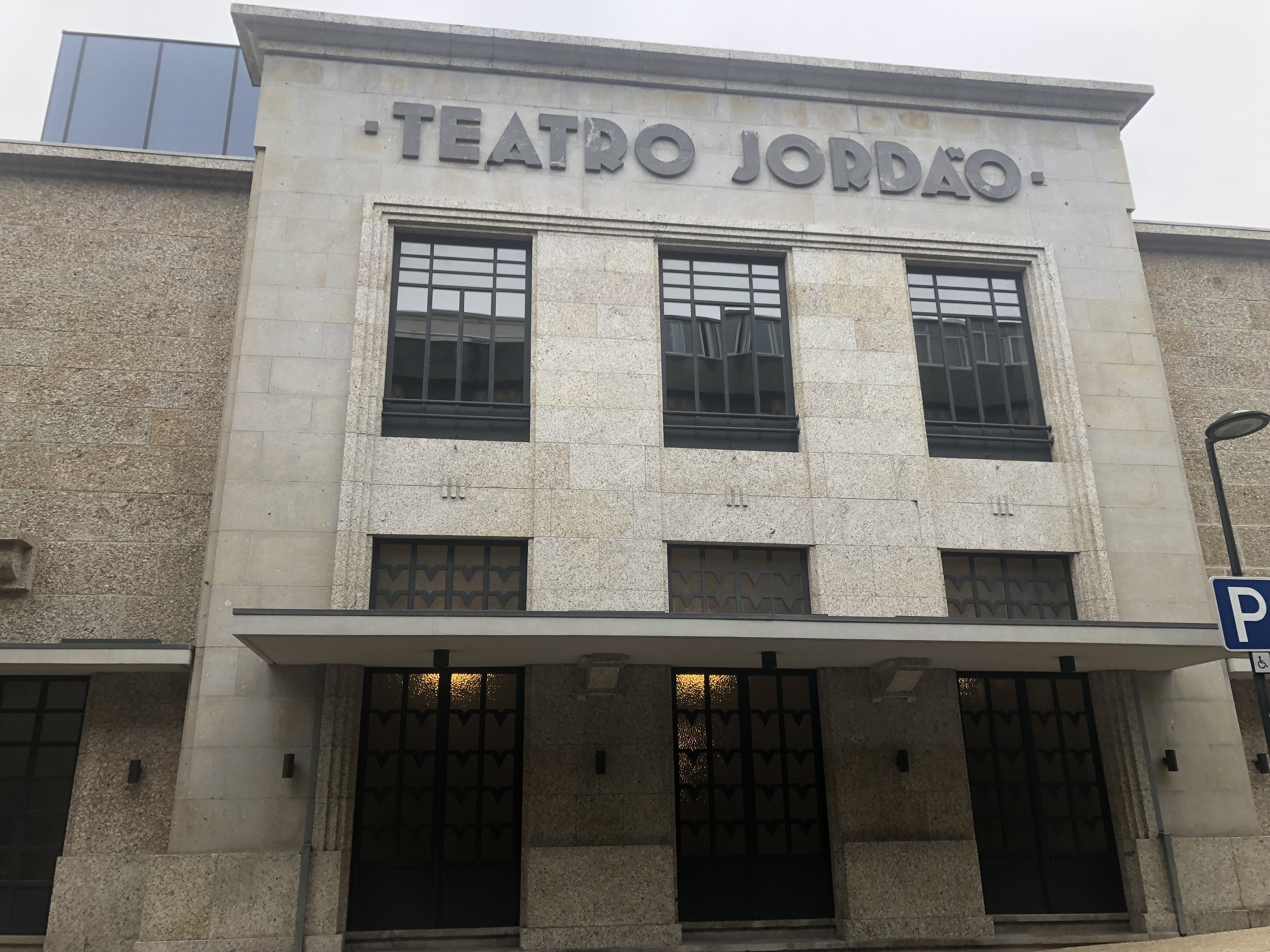
The Jordão Theatre’s main facade before and after the restoration works

In 2012, the project by architect Miguel Guedes was awarded first place in the public tender promoted by Guimarães City Council for the rehabilitation and functional conversion of the Jordão Theatre. In May 2017, a public tender was launched for the restoration of the building, but it was cancelled due to the competing companies not having "complied with the rules of procedure".

The Teatro Jordão complex was reopened and inaugurated on 12 February 2022 as a School of Visual Arts, Performing Arts and Music after being closed for nearly 30 years. The restoration and rehabilitation works were performed by the Pitagoras Group. The main theatre has 400 seats.

In 2023 it won the National Real Estate Award in the Collective Entrepreneurship category.
