= Church of São Miguel do Castelo =

Church of São Miguel
- Church of the Archangel Michael
- Igreja de São Miguel
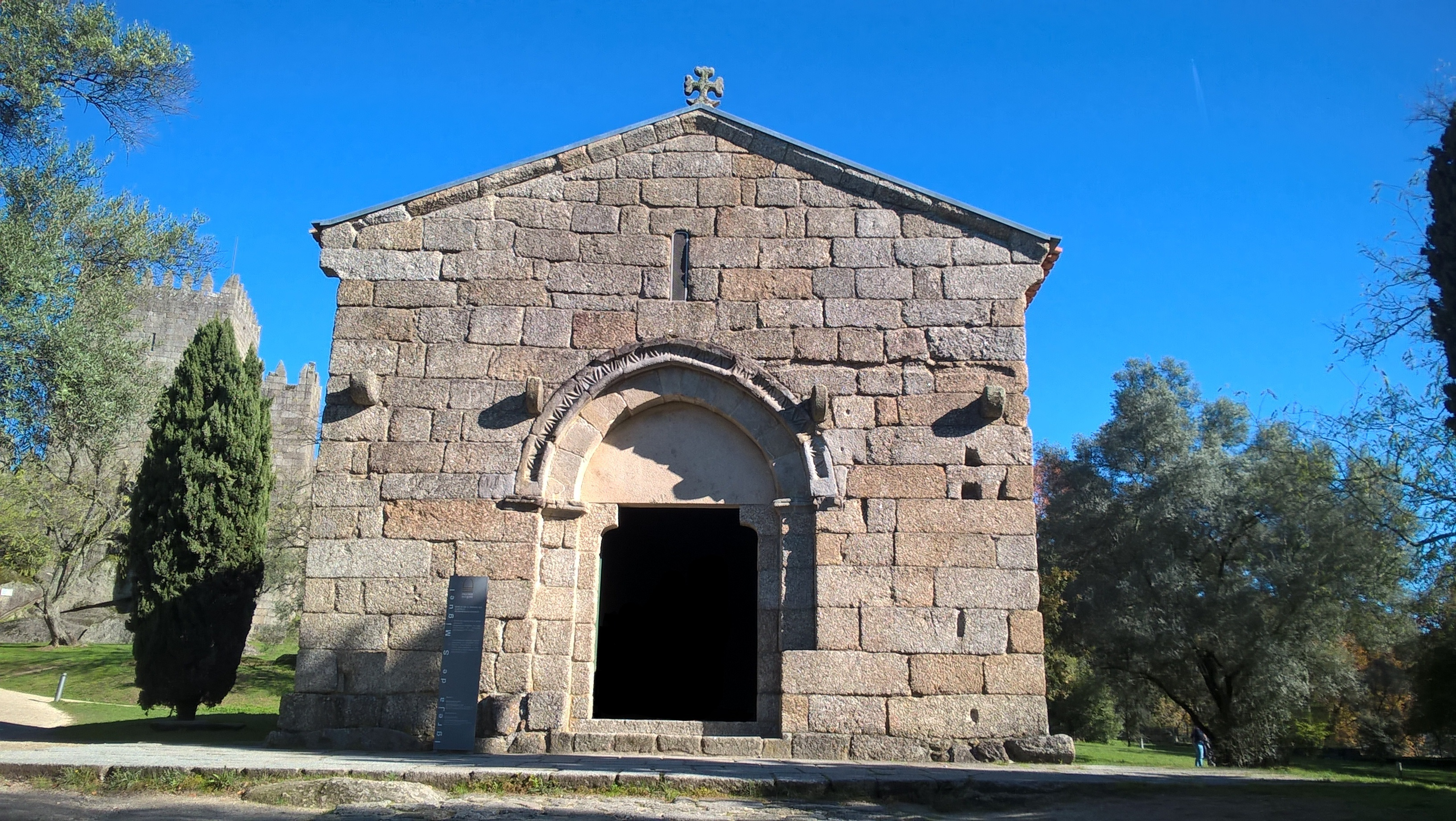
- Facade of the Church
- Church of São Miguel
- 41°26′50.23″N 8°17′27.41″W
- Location: Braga, Grande Porto, Norte
- Country: Portugal
- Website: pduques.imc-ip.pt

Architecture
- Style: Romanesque

Specifications
- Length: 8.75 m (28.7 ft)
- Width: 22.85 m (75.0 ft)

The Church of São Miguel do Castelo (Portuguese: Igreja de São Miguel do Castelo) is a medieval church in the civil parish of Oliveira do Castelo, municipality of Guimarães, in the northern district of Braga of Portugal. The church is emblematically linked to the foundation of the Portuguese Kingdom. Legend suggests that it was the sight of the baptism of the young Afonso Henriques. These claims are contradictory, since the date of the church's founding has been suggested to be during the reign of Afonso II of Portugal.

== History ==
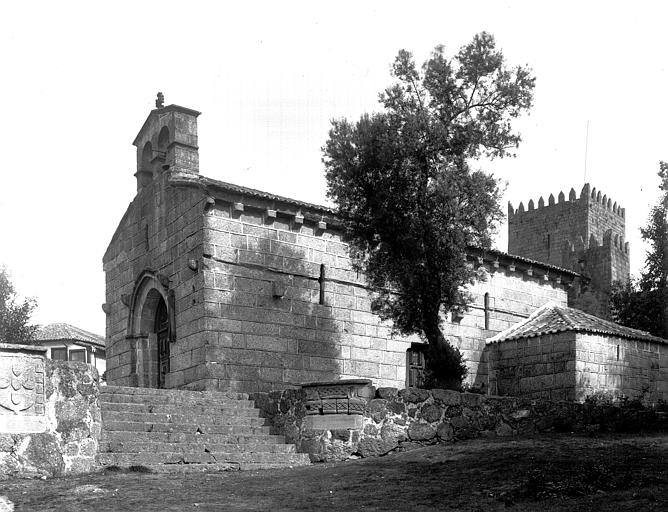
A rare image of the Church of São Miguel do Castelo prior to reconstruction that restored the facade of the church to its medieval appearance

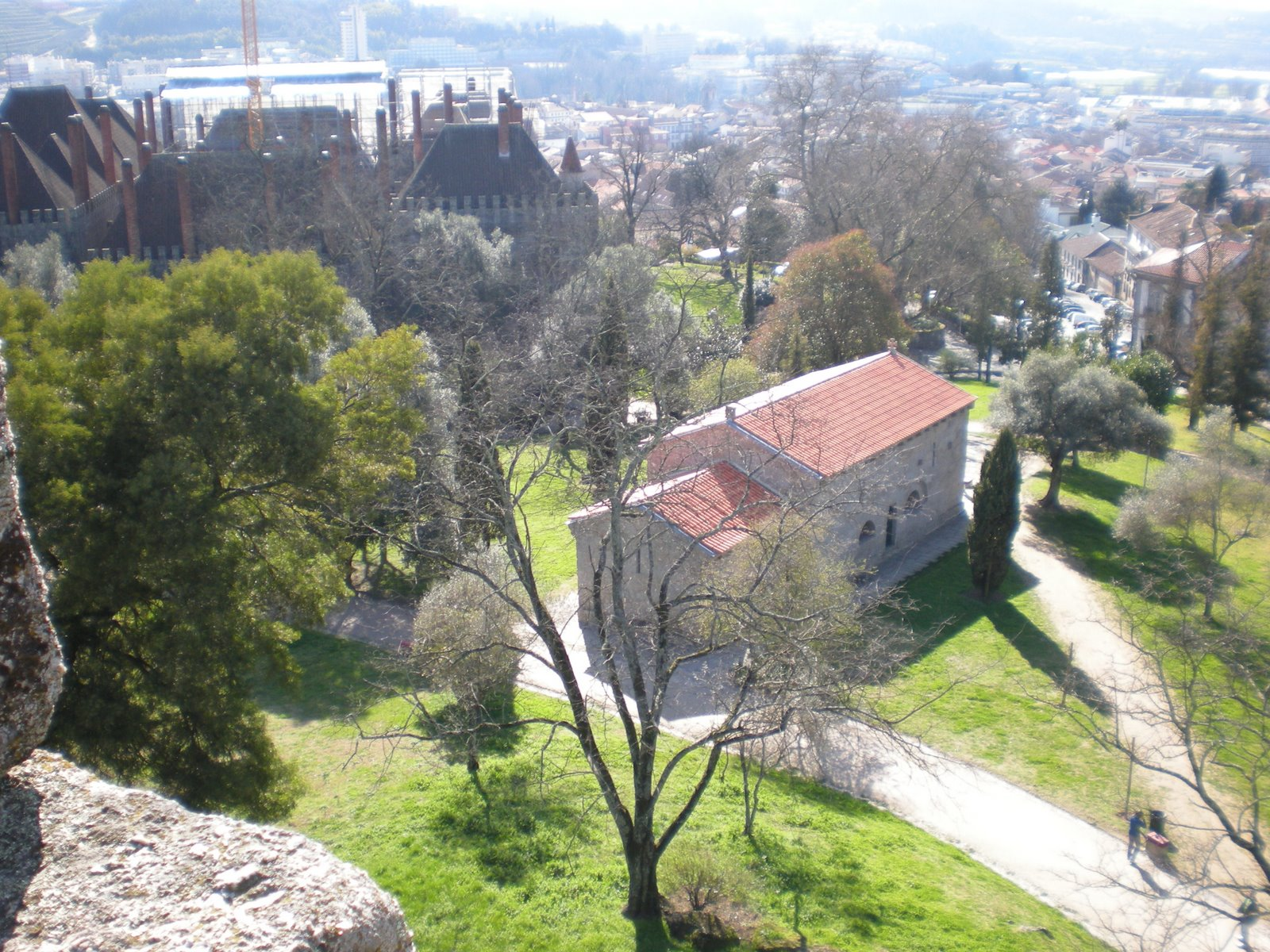
The landscape of Monte Latito within the Colina Sagrada (Sarcred Hill) of Guimarães

It was constructed within the circle of the Castle of Guimarães, with which it intimately shares a relationship. A few authors argue that it was the church where Afonso Henriques was baptized, dating its probable construction to the 9th or 10th century, during the era of Countess Mumadona Dias, exalting the ancestry of the Church and perpetuating the legend. This current of nationalist histography, which ideologically supported a Romantic revisionism dates to the 19th century and continues to this day (as evidenced from the plaque erected on the site).

Yet, this interpretation contradicts that date of its consecration and first reference by the Church, which only occurred in the 13th century, in conditions particularly difficult for these early ancestors. The church was first referenced in 1216, in a document to the collegiate of canons in Guimarães. Its construction occurred even as this group of clergy were quarrelling with the powerful Archbishop of Braga, which later led to armed confrontation. The building of the Church was justified by the need of a temple in Guimarães, a decision which escaped the Archbishop at the time. It was later consecrated by the Archbishop of Braga circa 1239. Later, it was also referred to as a suffrage of Santa Maria de Nossa Senhora da Oliveira in 1258.

During the Inquirições (inquiries/inventory) of King Afonso III of Portugal the church was referenced in its construction, noting the involvement of the stonemason Garcia Petrarius, who was likely a Moor.

An inscription relating to later re-modelling was unveiled in 1664.

In 1795, the prior of the Collegiate of Nossa Senhora da Oliveira ordered the substitution of the cross arch in this year.

By 1870, the temple ceased to be the parochial church owing to the considerable degradation and ruin of the building. In ruins during the totality of the 1870s, a commission of notable inhabitants in Guimarães, affiliated with the Sociedade Martins Sarmento, proceeded to restore and maintain the essential characteristics that the church had accumulated along the centuries. Between 1874 and 1880, public works to restore the building, including the re-positioning of the primitive cross arch were undertaken. On their completion, the church was once again opened to the public for services.

In 1957, the area around the chapel was restored by the landscape artist Viana Barreto.

The General-Directorate for Buildings and National Monuments (Portuguese: Direcção Geral dos Edifícios e Monumentos Nacionais) demolished the main body of the sacristy to the southern lateral facade, in order to restore the original medieval character of the church. It was followed in 1936 with the dismantling of the steeple that existed on the facade, resulting in a reconstruction and repairs to the gable. Similar renovations and reconstructions were carried out in 1939 (new roof and doors) and reinforcement of the chapel cracks with six boxes of wire mesh in 1963.

== Architecture ==
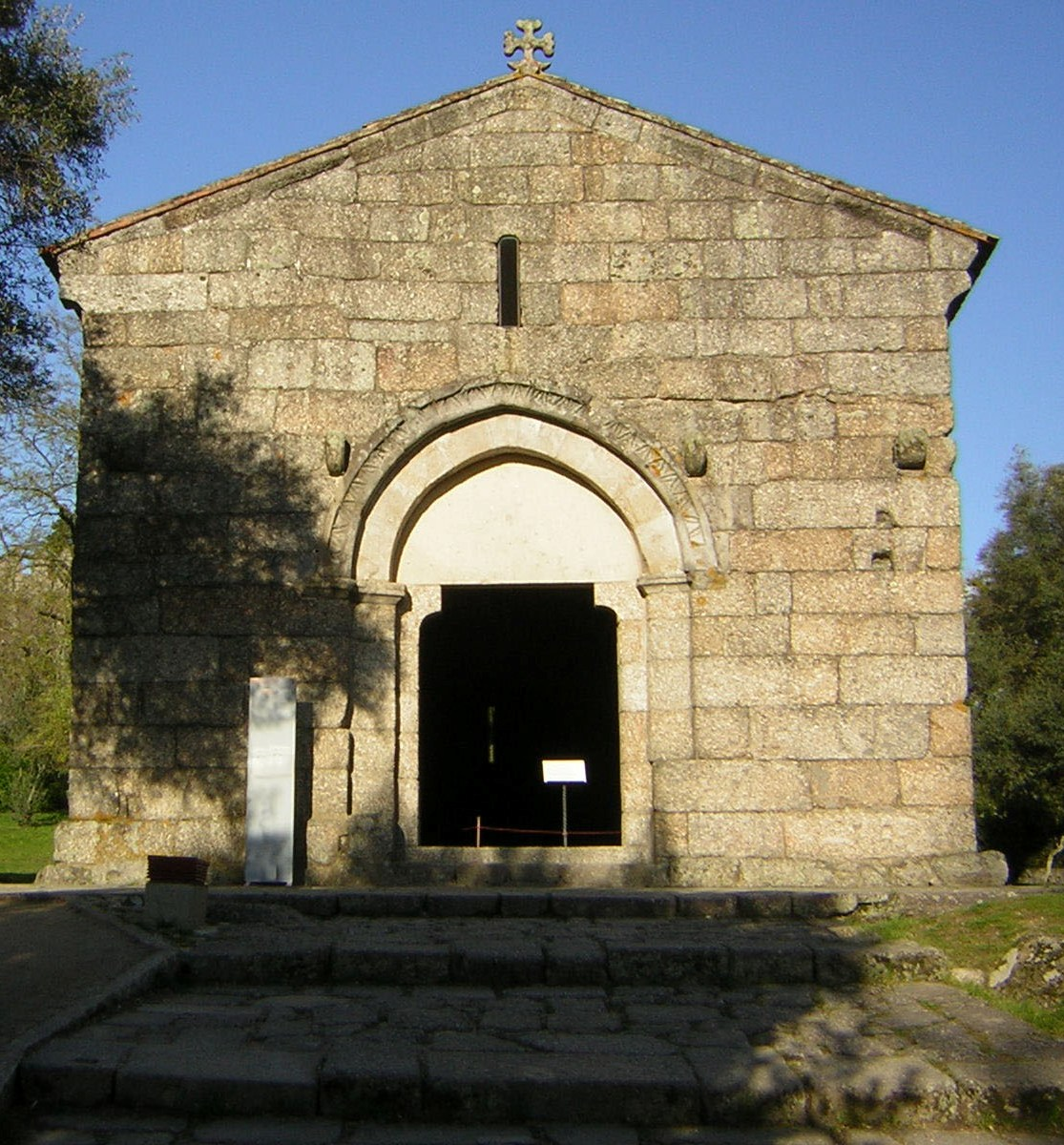
Main entrance with a facade that includes an archivolt portico, slit windows and cross fleury

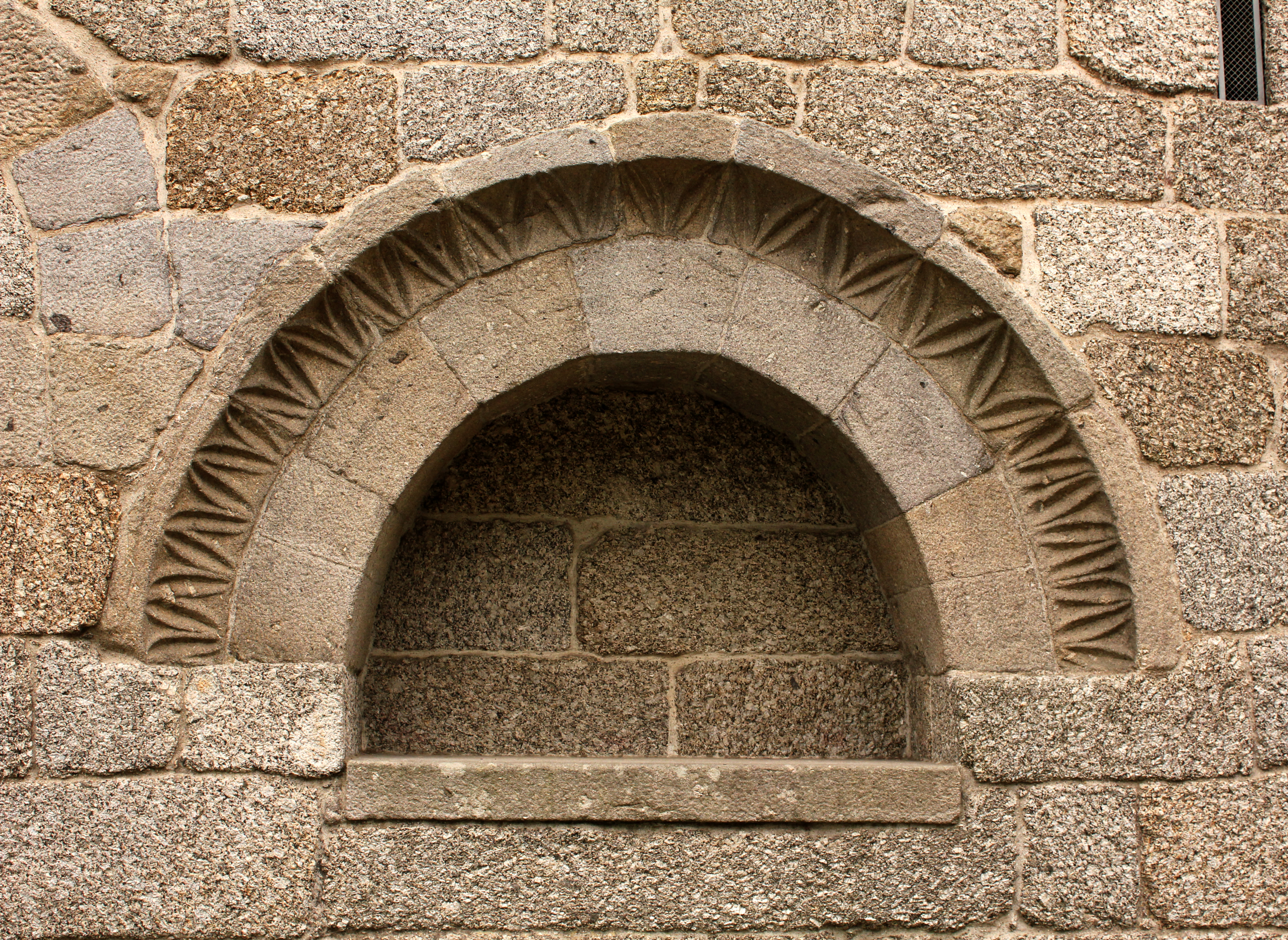
The ornate arcosolium on the northern facade of the Church

The Church stands on the northern limit of the historic centre of Guimarães, on the flank of Monte Latito, encircled by forest and accessible by several pedestrian trails. To the southeast is the Chapel of Santa Cruz, to the north is the Castle of Guimarães and to the south the Palace of the Dukes of Braganza.

Stylistically, the building appears to conform to secondary status on the Sacred Hill (Portuguese: Colina Sagrada) of Guimarães. Manuel Monteiro highlighted that the chapel was simple, and concluded that it was a slightly illegal construction (as indicated by the conflict between the Archbishop and the canons of Guimarães). Its almost lack of decoration, with compact walls, low lighting and simple plan (nave and juxtapositioned chancel), were to Monteiro's opinion, indicators of an illegal treatment of the building. When the Archbishop finally consecrated the building the influence of Gothic architecture began to be promoted within the territories, and Romanesque treatments were seen as a resistance to the new style.

The longitudinal church existing of a single rectangular nave and chancel, is built on staggered horizontal spaces covered in a tiled-roof. The walls are constructed in granite blocks topped by gables, while the lateral walls support double eaves. The main facade with portico with interrupted lintel includes a double arch with simple tympanum. The archway is flanked by beams supporting the main body, while a slit window surmounts the entrance and a cross fleury at the apex of its frontispiece. The lateral southern and northern walls are accessible by doors with lintels, and surmounted by demarcated arch with complementary beams and slit windows (as in the facade, but less grand).

The northern façade also includes arcosolia on either side of the door, one semi-ornate that includes archivolt decoration and the other more simple. The posterior wall also includes a slit window open to the apse and Maltese cross above the main body of the nave.

=== Interior ===
The simple granite walls of the church are duplicated in the granite slabs that are applied to the floor. Many of the slabs are inscribed and decorated as funeral sepulchres with the names of knights who fell in the line of duty.

At the front left of the chapel is the baptismal font, made of granite in a simple circular form. This baptistery is demarcated by an iron gate crowned in stylized fleur-de-lis. Alongside is a stone with inscription stating that the baptistery was used to baptize Afonso Henriques in 1106. Lateral porticos are carved into simple arches. A full triumphal arch is decorated with frieze with interlocking ribbon motifs, while a cornice runs across the perimeter of the temple.

On a one-step platform in the chancel is a granite altar that stands against the wall fascia on footstool of two steps.
