= Oliveira do Castelo =

Extinct parish in Guimarães, Portugal

- Civil parish
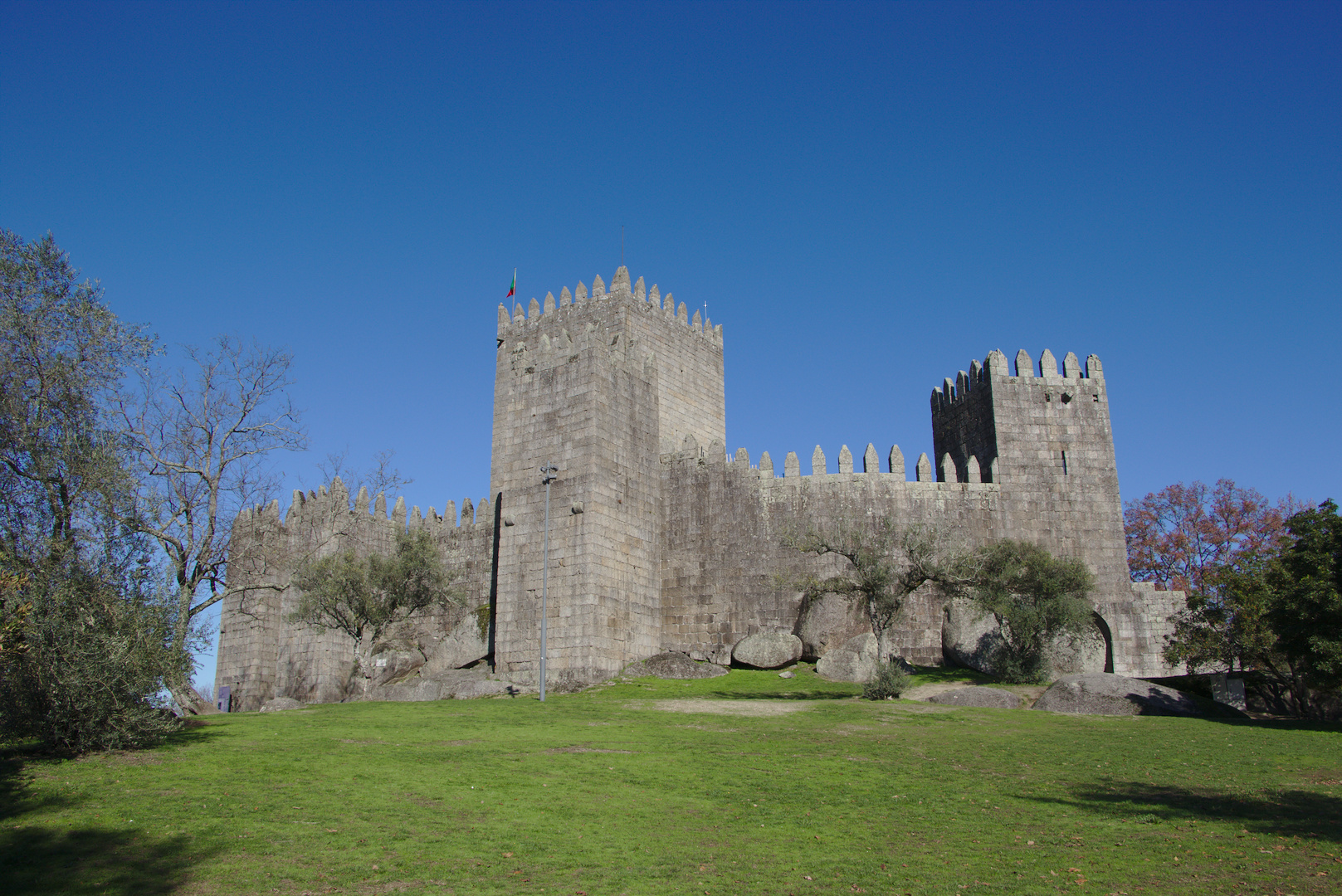
- The Castle of Guimarães, in 2018.

- Coat of arms

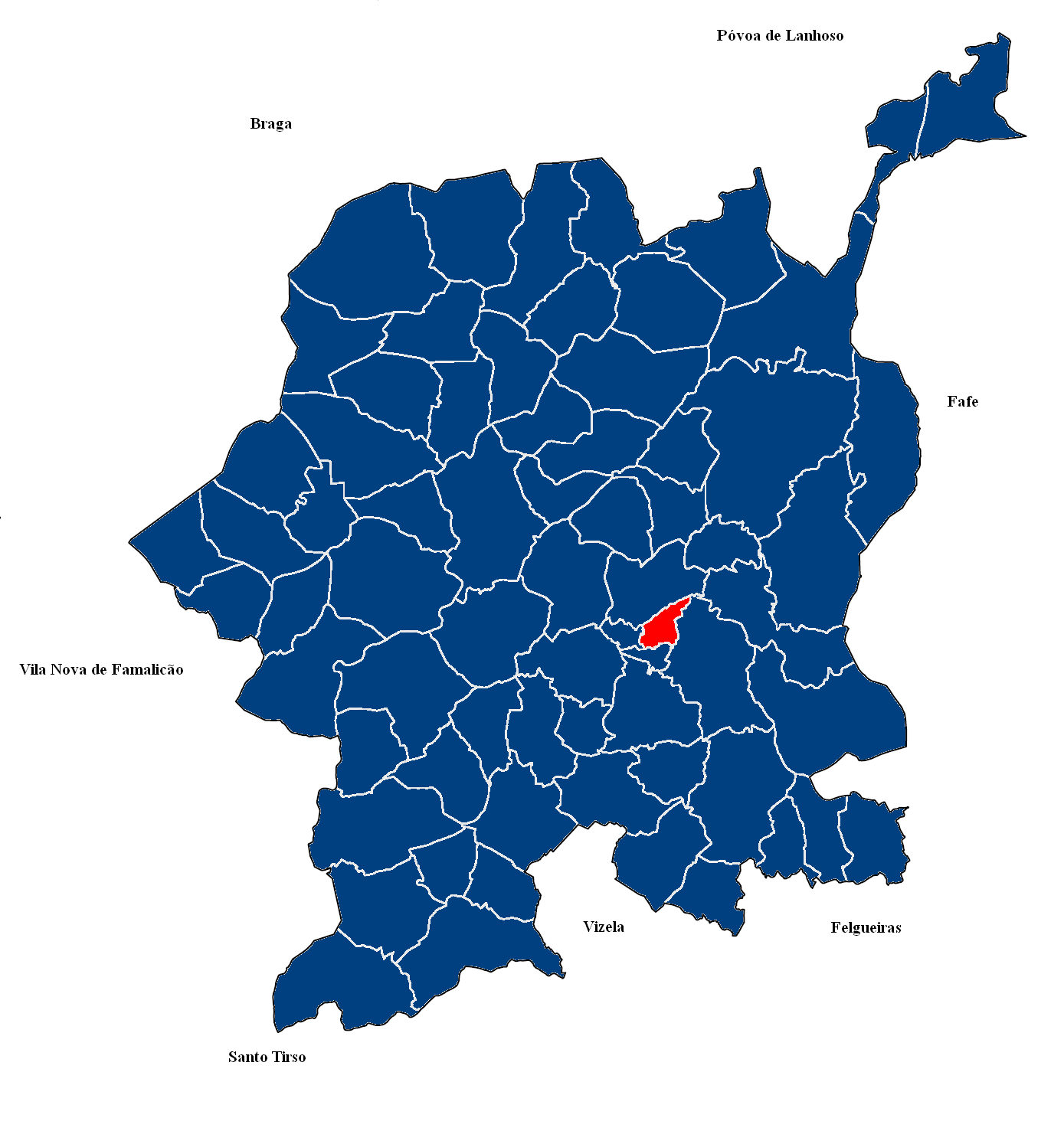
- Location within Guimarães.
- Coordinates: 41°27′01″N 8°17′17″W
- Country: Portugal
- Region: Norte
- Intermunic. comm.: Ave
- District: Braga
- Municipality: Guimarães

Area
  - Total: 0.69 km^{2} (0.27 sq mi)

Population (2011)
  - Total: 3,265
  - Density: 4,700/km^{2} (12,000/sq mi)
- Time zone: UTC+00:00 (WET)
  - Summer (DST): UTC+01:00 (WEST)

Oliveira do Castelo is an extinct freguesia in the municipality of Guimarães, with an area of 0.69 km^{2} and 3265 inhabitants (2011). Its population density was of 4,731.9 inhabitants/km^{2}. A big part of it is located in the Historic Center of Guimarães.

It was the seat of a freguesia that was abolished in 2013, as part of a national administrative reform, to form a new parish, together with São Paio and São Sebastião, called Oliveira, São Paio e São Sebastião, with its seat at Alameda de São Dâmaso in Guimarães.

== Landmarks ==
- Castle of Guimarães, 10th-century medieval castle.
- Palace of the Dukes of Braganza, 15th-century palace belonging to the Dukes of Braganza, it is also one of the most visited places in Portugal with 366.514 visits in 2022.
- Nossa Senhora da Oliveira Church, 10th-century church.
- Paços do Concelho de Guimarães, the previous câmara municipal of the city.
- Padrão do Salado, 14th-century monument celebrating the Portuguese victory at the Battle of Río Salado.
- Church of São Miguel do Castelo, the church where Afonso Henriques was presumably baptised.
- Chapel of Santa Cruz, 17th-century chapel.

== Population ==
Population of the freguesia of Oliveira do Castelo (1864 – 2011)

| Year | Pop. | ±% |
|---|---|---|
| 1864 | 3,400 | — |
| 1878 | 3,626 | +6.6% |
| 1890 | 3,718 | +2.5% |
| 1900 | 4,084 | +9.8% |
| 1911 | 4,278 | +4.8% |
| 1920 | 3,926 | −8.2% |
| 1930 | 4,324 | +10.1% |
| 1940 | 4,905 | +13.4% |

| Year | Pop. | ±% |
|---|---|---|
| 1950 | 5,408 | +10.3% |
| 1960 | 5,501 | +1.7% |
| 1970 | 4,579 | −16.8% |
| 1981 | 4,887 | +6.7% |
| 1991 | 3,687 | −24.6% |
| 2001 | 3,448 | −6.5% |
| 2011 | 3,265 | −5.3% |

== Junta de Freguesia election results ==
| Partidos | % | M | % | M | % | M | % | M | % | M | % | M | % | M | % | M | % | M | % | M |
| Partidos | 1976 | | 1979 | | 1982 | | 1985 | | 1989 | | 1993 | | 1997 | | 2001 | | 2005 | | 2009 | |
|---|---|---|---|---|---|---|---|---|---|---|---|---|---|---|---|---|---|---|---|---|
| CDS-PP | 31,3 | 3 | | | | | 20,0 | 2 | 13,3 | 1 | 9,7 | 1 | 7,7 | | 7,7 | | 6,3 | | 10,9 | 1 |
| PS | 29,9 | 3 | 31,2 | 4 | 35,9 | 5 | 30,1 | 3 | 39,3 | 4 | 42,7 | 4 | 43,2 | 5 | 40,1 | 4 | 38,4 | 4 | 32,4 | 3 |
| PPD/PSD | 20,7 | 2 | | | | | 37,6 | 4 | 37,6 | 4 | 36,2 | 4 | 33,5 | 3 | 38,8 | 4 | 38,9 | 4 | 44,0 | 4 |
| FEPU/APU/CDU | 11,8 | 1 | 15,3 | 2 | 12,3 | 1 | 9,1 | | 6,9 | | 7,9 | | 11,5 | 1 | 9,5 | 1 | 11,5 | 1 | 9,3 | 1 |
| AD | | | 53,5 | 7 | 49,5 | 7 | | | | | | | | | | | | | | |
