= Júlio de Brito =

Portuguese architect and engineer

Júlio José de Brito
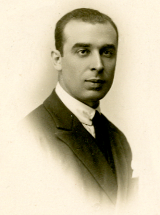
- Photograph of Júlio de Brito
- Born: March 30, 1896; Paris, France
- Died: March 26, 1965 (aged 68); Porto, Portugal
- Education: University of Porto
- Occupations: Architect, engineer, teacher
- Years active: 1922-1964
- Parent(s): José de Brito, Isabelle de Brito
- Buildings: Some significant works might include: Rivoli Theatre; Coliseu do Porto; Jordão Theatre; Vila Real High School; Main buildings of the Companhia de Fiação e Tecidos de Guimarães

Júlio José de Brito was a Portuguese architect, engineer and teacher. He stood out mainly as an architect, having designed several emblematic buildings in the city of Porto, such as the Rivoli Theatre and the Coliseum of Porto.

== Biography ==
Júlio de Brito was born in the city of Paris, on 30 March 1896. His parents were the famous painter, José de Brito (1855–1946), and a French girl called Isabelle Ruffier Poupelloz de Brito (1874–1954).

He attended a general high school course, and in 1910 he entered the Architecture Course at the Escola Superior de Belas-Artes do Porto, and at the same time he was a student at both the Complementary High School Course and the Engineering Course at the University of Porto. He finished the latter in 1924, and two years later was qualified as an architect.

He retired in 1964, but his retirement was short-lived as he died in Porto on 26 March 1965.

== Career ==
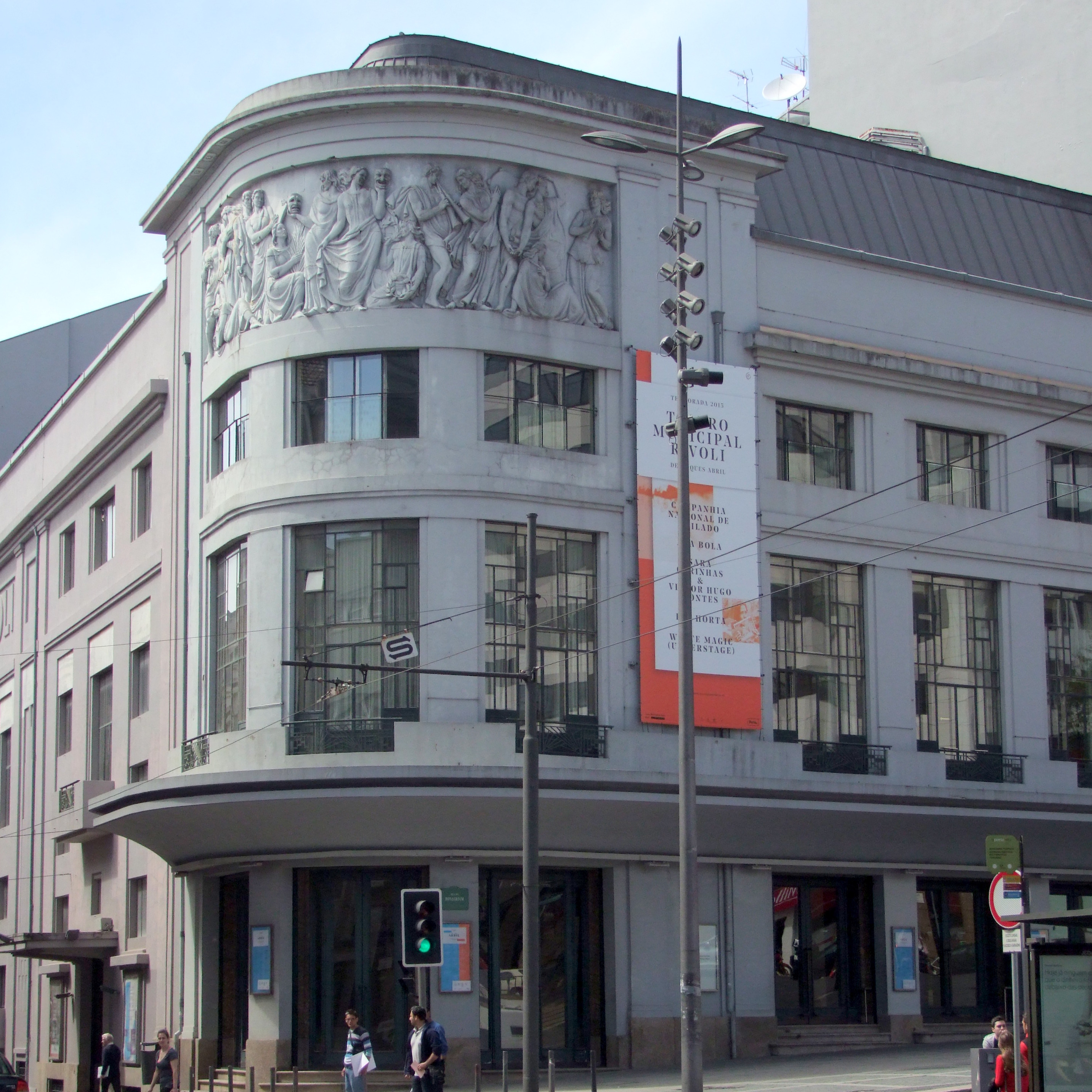
Rivoli Theatre, designed by Júlio de Brito

He began his career as a teacher in 1922, while still a student, teaching at the Rodrigues de Freitas High School.

In 1926 he became acting professor at the Escola Superior de Belas-Artes do Porto, where he rose to full professor about two years later, a position he held until his retirement. At that school he mainly taught calculus and topography.

Júlio de Brito in his last years of life

As well as being a teacher, he also worked as an engineer and architect, and was responsible for the construction of numerous buildings in the city of Porto, including his most famous works, the Rivoli Theatre, inaugurated in 1932, and the Coliseu do Porto, inaugurated in 1941, the latter in collaboration with Cassiano Branco, José Porto, Yan Wils, Charles Siclis and Mário de Abreu.

He also designed the Jordão Theatre in Guimarães, the buildings of the Companhia de Fiação e Tecidos de Fafe in Fafe, and the Vila Real High School in Vila Real.

== See also ==
- International Exhibition of Modern Decorative and Industrial Arts
- Portuguese architecture
- University of Porto
