= Rivoli Theatre (Portugal) =

Theatre and cinema in Porto, Portugal

Coordinates: 41°08′51.92″N 8°36′34.73″W

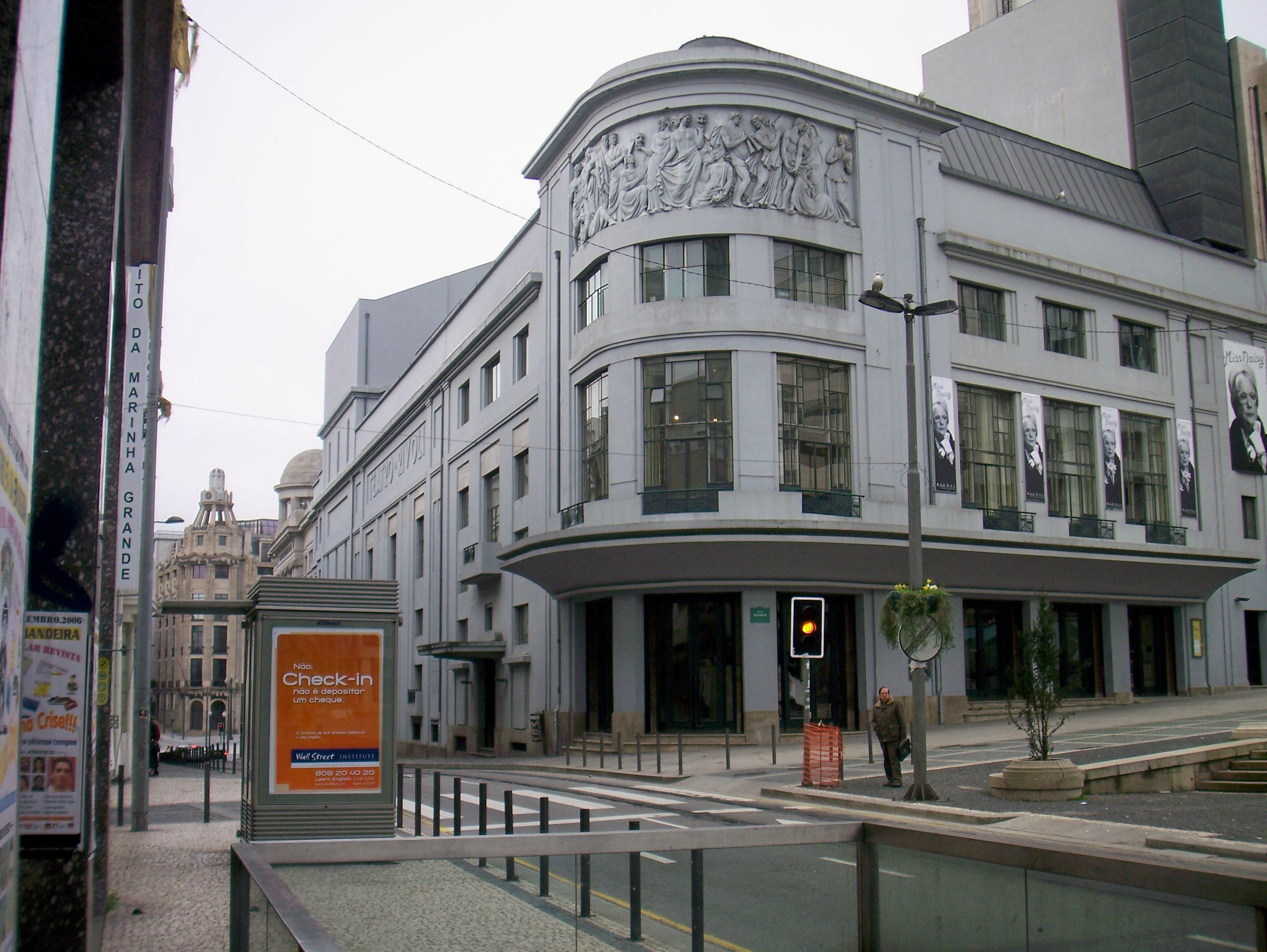
Art Deco façade of Rivoli Theatre

Rivoli Theatre is a municipal theatre in Porto, Portugal.

== History ==
In 1913 a new theatre called Teatro Nacional opened in Porto. Over the next several years, changes in the urban center led to modernization of the property, and in 1923 the new Rivoli Theatre appeared, remodelled, adapted to cinema and with programming of opera, dance, theater and music. The new theatre, in Art Deco style, was the responsibility of the Architect and Engineer Júlio Brito.

As of 2015 Rivoli Theatre is a municipal theater, Teatro Municipal do Porto.
