= Gil Vicente Theatre =

Theatre and art association in Guimarães, Portugal

- Teatro Gil Vicente
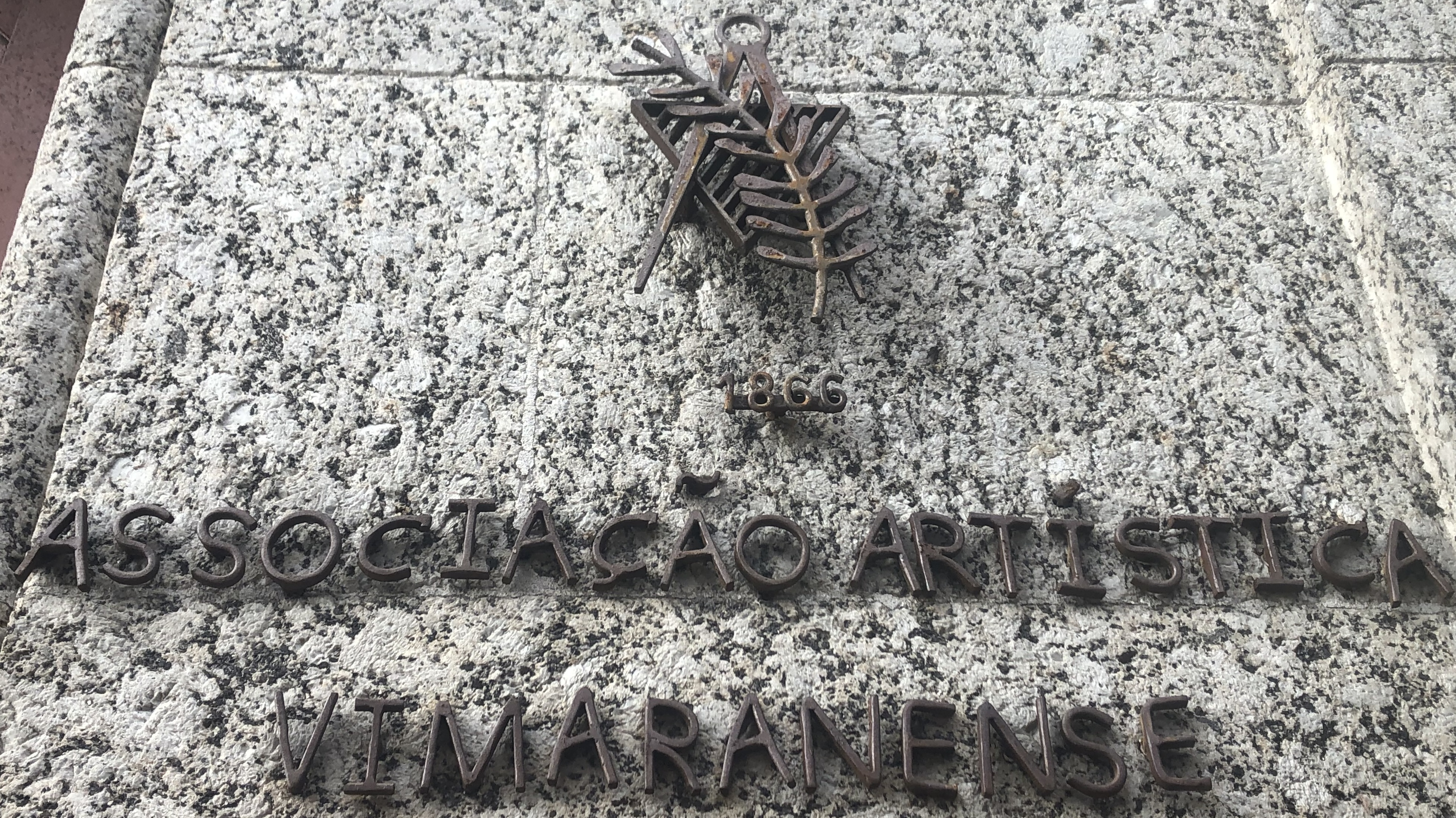

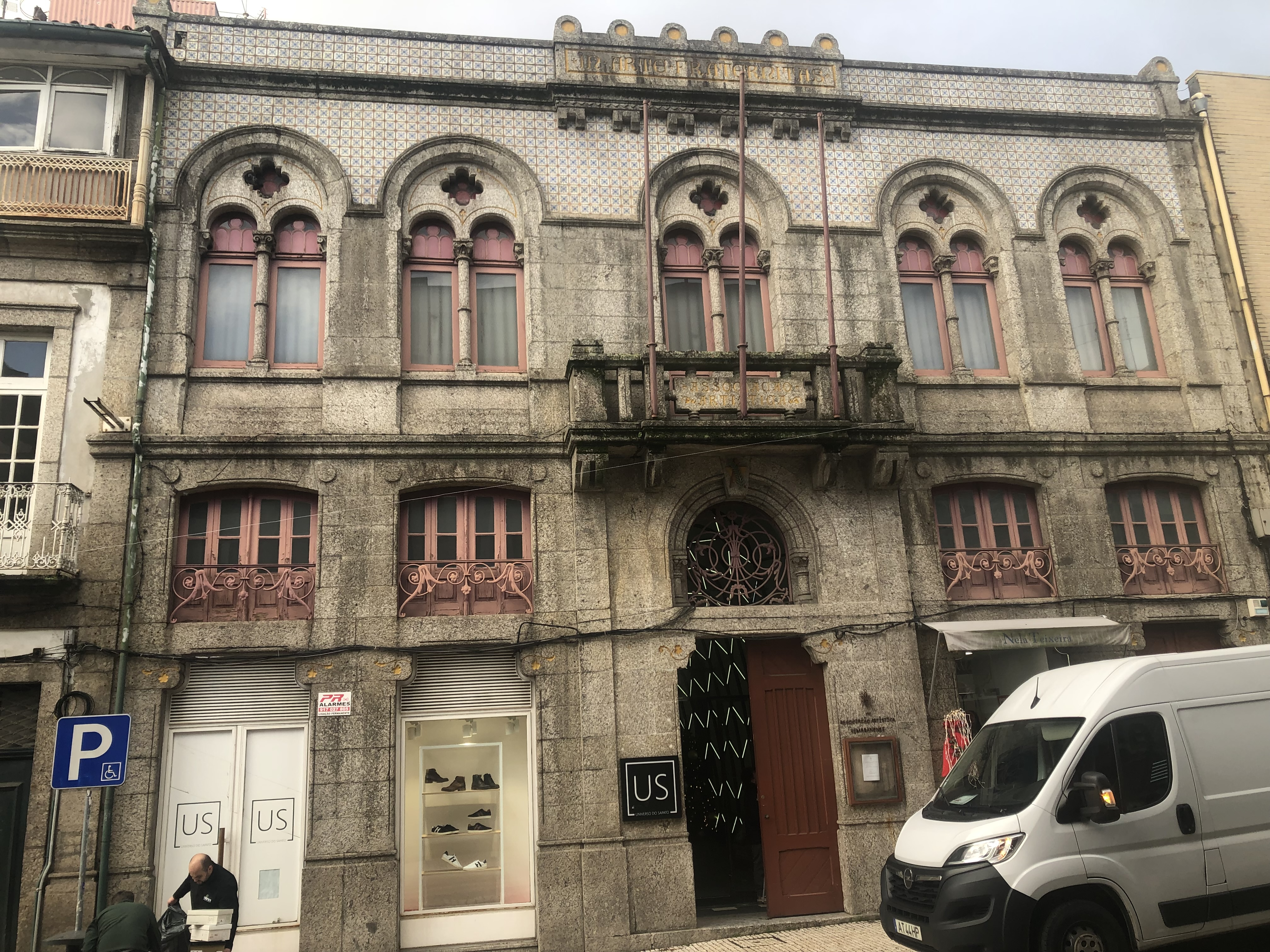
- The Gil Vicente Theatre in 2024
- Interactive map of the Gil Vicente Theatre area
- Alternative names: Associação de Socorros Mútuos Artística Vimaranense (Mutual Aid and Artistic Association of Guimarães, or ASMAV)

General information
- Status: Protected landmark
- Type: Theatre, Cinema, Artistic Association
- Architectural style: Venetian Gothic Revival
- Location: Gil Vicente Street, Guimarães, Portugal
- Coordinates: 41.44418°N 8.29604°W
- Years built: Sometime between 1888 and 1908
- Renovated: Early 2000s

Design and construction
- Architect: Nicola Bigaglia

Website
- Associativismo Guimarães – ASMAV

The Gil Vicente Theatre, currently known as Associação de Socorros Mútuos Artística Vimaranense (Mutual Aid and Artistic Association of Guimarães, or ASMAV), is a historic building at the Gil Vicente Street, in Guimarães, Portugal.

== History ==
It was built by the Venetian architect Nicola Bigaglia sometime between 1888 and 1908 in the Venetian Gothic Revival style, unique in the city.

On 26 February 1866, the ASMAV was installed at the Afonso Henriques Theatre and remained there until their headquarters were transferred to the Gil Vicente Theatre a few decades later.

The legal dispute between the tenants and owners over who owned the rights to the use of the Gil Vicente Theatre, on 25 July 1935, led to the temporary closure of the only cinema/theatre in the city (at the time), a situation that lasted for the next 18 months. Meanwhile, the cinemaphiles of Guimarães had to satiate their love for cinema in other places, outside the city.

In the early 2000s the ASMAV, after a decline in membership and notability between the 1960s and 1990s that resulted in a shortage of funds and the deterioration of the building, finally restored the asset.

It currently functions both as a retail space and an event venue, hosting activities such as concerts, theatrical pieces, movie screenings, political rallies and debates, and parts of the annual Rhetoric Tournament of Guimarães, that includes both the municipal and school level phases of the 4 highschools of the city: Martins Sarmento, Francisco de Holanda, Santos Simões and Taipas.
