= Castle of Guimarães =

Medieval castle in Guimarães, Portugal

- Castelo de Guimarães
- Braga, Ave, Norte in Portugal
- The 10th-century Castle of Guimarães, a national symbol referred to as the Cradle of Portugal

Site information
- Type: Castle
- Owner: Portuguese Republic
- Open to the public: Public

Location
- Location of the Castle of Guimarães within the municipality of Guimarães
- Coordinates: 41°26′52.47″N 8°17′25.29″W

Site history
- Materials: Granite, Wood, Tile

UNESCO World Heritage Site
- Part of: Historic Centre of Guimarães
- Criteria: Cultural: ii, iii, iv
- Reference: 1031
- Inscription: 2001 (25th Session)

Portuguese National Monument
- Type: Non-movable
- Criteria: National Monument
- Designated: 27 August 1908
- Reference no.: IPA.00001060

Aerial view of Monte Latito, featuring the Palace of the Dukes of Braganza (left) and Guimarães Castle (right)

The keep and surrounding ramparts of the castle

The Castle of Guimarães (Portuguese: Castelo de Guimarães) is the principal medieval castle in the municipality Guimarães, in the northern region of Portugal. It was built under the orders of Mumadona Dias in the 10th century to defend the monastery from attacks by Moors and Norsemen.

The castle is a military fortification grounded primarily in the late Romanesque period, and elaborated during the early Gothic epoch of Portuguese architecture. Its area is delineated by walls forming a pentagram, similar to a shield, that includes eight rectangular towers, military square and central keep. Originating in the foundations of a Roman structure, from the writings of Alfredo Guimarães, it was later elaborated on the French model, in its current the form of a shield, with reduced central yard and difficult accesses. It includes several Gothic characteristics, owing to its remodelling at the end of the 13th century, when the keep and residences were constructed (possibly over pre-existing structures).

== History ==
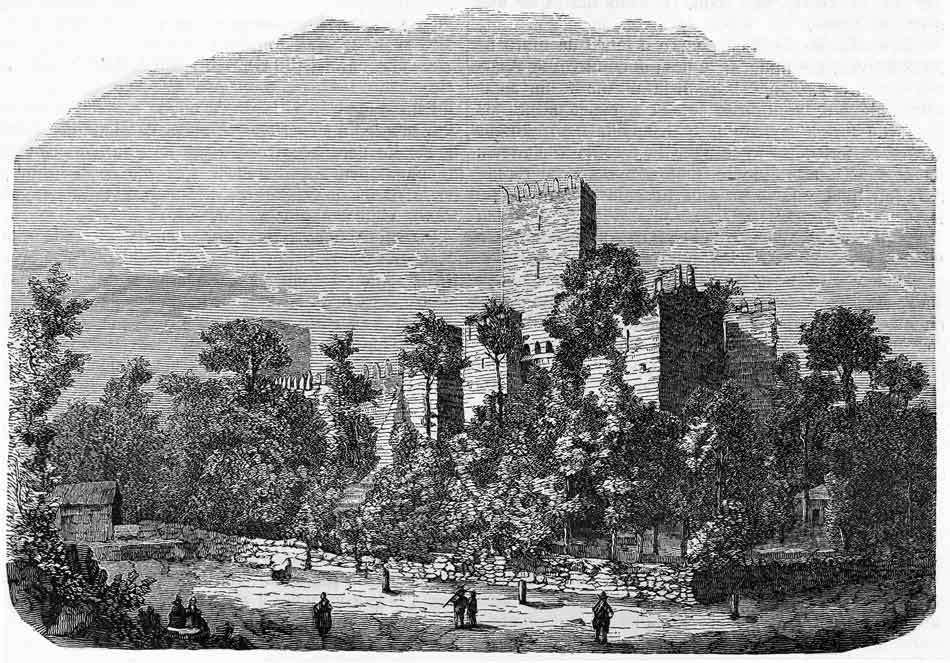
An 1863 engraving of the battlements and keep at Guimarães

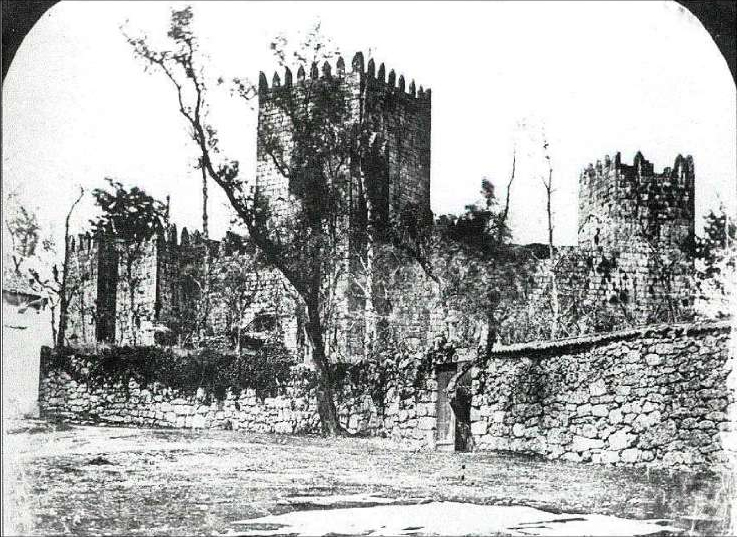
Photo of the Castle of Guimarães, 1845

=== Early history ===
Emblematic of the medieval Portuguese castle, Guimarães is associated with the origins of the Portuguese nation. Yet, the phases and organization involved in its construction, from the 10th century onwards is very deficient, with many of its present structure resulting from its reconstruction in the second half of the 13th century. The examination of its walls and remains led Carlos A. F. de Almeida to proclaim, for example, that the flanking towers were constructed during the late Romanesque, early Gothic period.

In the second half of the 10th century, owing to the death of Count Hermenegildo Gonçalves, the property of Vimaranes (today Guimarães) was inherited by his daughter Oneca. Countess Mumadona Dias, the count's widow, traded her property in Creiximir for the land in Vimaranes, and ordered the construction of a monastery situated on land today occupied by the Collegiate and Church of Nossa Senhora da Oliveira (PT010308340007). Later, in order to defend the curate at the monastery, the countess ordered the construction of the castle. By 4 December 968, a codicil, the countess referred to the castle (then designated as the Castle of São Mamede) as just having been constructed, in order to defend the friars and nuns in the monastery.

At the end of the 10th century, Dias's eldest son, Gonçalo Mendes, takes possession of the lands following her death and maintaining her wishes to support the monastery. But, Gonçalo Muniuz, son of Múnio (fourth son of Mumadona Dias) attempted to seize the town and castle, but he was impeded by his uncle Gonçalo, then family patriarch. These family squabbles continued, when Ordonho Ramírez, great-grandson of Mumadona, (Note: This Ordoño Ramírez was the son of Ramiro Menéndez, son of Count Gonçalo Mendes) took the castle and town, later bequeathing them to his daughter Mumadona, on her marriage to Fernando Gundemáriz, son of Gundemaro Pinióliz. The town and castle were eventually sold to Gontrode Ordonhes, the other daughter of Ordonho Ramírez and sister-in-law of Fernando Gundemáriz who was married to Mendo Folienz, who eventually donated the monastery in 1045 to the curate.

=== Medieval Era ===
At the end of the 11th century the castle was heavily expanded and remodeled, under the direction of Count Henry, to act as his residence. The vestiges of the work are found near the entrance, and includes consisting of five rows of large ashlars, defining an arched wall, that were part of bastion between granite outcrops, within a castle with walled courtyard. The fortress, then over a century old, needed renovation. The nobleman chose to destroy what remained from Mumadona's construction, while extending the area of the castle and adding two entrances. The castle became the official royal residence from 1139, when Portugal became independent from the Kingdom of León, until circa 1200. It was at this residence that Afonso Henriques was born in 1111, living his life in the castle, which became the residence of the Counts of Portucale.

Following years of family rivalries, in 1128, the Battle of São Mamede (fought within the fields of the same name) gave origin to the independence of Portucale and the formation of the nucleus of what would become Portugal.

The main flanking towers at the main gate: built at the end of the 13th century, following French influences

Between the end of the 13th and beginning of the 14th century, the castle was remodelled by King Denis, resulting in the form that stands to this day. The alcalde Mem Martins de Vasconcelos, siding with the king, resisted the siege by the Infante D. Afonso. In 1369, King Henry II of Castile invaded Portugal and encircled the castle of Guimarães, but was defeated by its population and forces loyal to then-alcaide Gonçalo Pais de Meira. Yet, several years (1385) King John I encircled the castle, and it was the alcaide Aires Gomes da Silva, supporter of Beatriz, who defended its walls. Sometime between 1383 and 1433, the two towers that flank the main entrance were order built by King John I of Portugal.

In 1653, the town prosecutors of Guimarães within the Cortes petitioned "it was worth the village castle, the most sumptuous of the kingdom, which is becoming ruined, and if care is not taken, will become completely ruined, at the cost of the alcalde's rents. And the walls, also the best in the kingdom, if they are not repaired, will fall into ruin, equally the two towers without a little repair." Yet, by 1793, Alberto Vieira Braga referred to the "inutility" of the walls that circled the town, owing to their state of ruin. This changes marked the slow decline of the structure as a defense fortification.

By 1836, the councilmen of Guimarães were already looking to demolition the castle, and reuse the stone to repave the roadways. A member of the Sociedade Patriótica Vimaranense (Patriotic Society of Guimarães) defended the demolition of the castle, and suggested the use of its stones to pave the streets of Guimarães, as the fortress had been used as a political prison during the reign of King Miguel. However, this was never accepted. 45 years later, on 19 March 1881, the Diário do Governo (Official Journal) listed the Guimarães Castle as the most unusual historic monument of the whole region of Minho. After the castle's demolition was abandoned in the 19th century, many of the houses, estates and lodgings around the castle were expropriated.

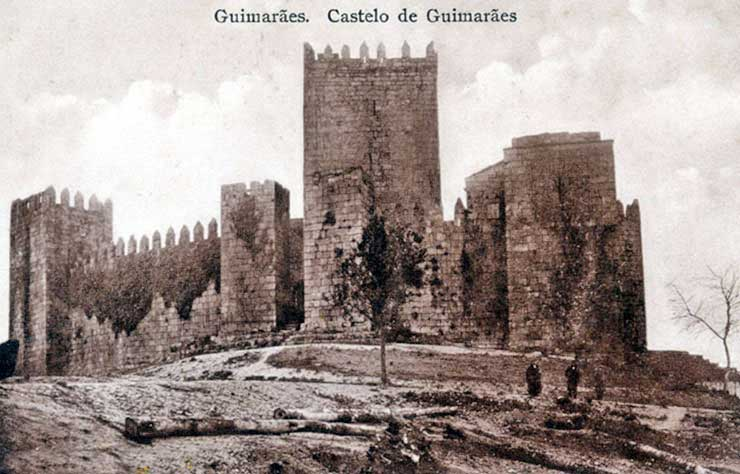
A view of the Cradle of Portugal in 1910: at the time of the formation of the First Portuguese Republic

The first attempts at restoration occurred during the mid-20th century, specifically in 1936. In 1910, the castle was declared a national monument. In 1937, the General Service for National Buildings and Monuments started its restorations. The structure was re-inaugurated on 4 June 1940, on the occasion of the centenary of the castle.

On 20 April 1952, a special protection zone was established that included the castle, Church of São Miguel and the Palace of the Dukes of Braganza. Further elaboration of a plan for the area was completed within the 1957 landscaping of the area around the chapel by Viana Barreto.

In the course of installing new electrical systems at the castle, a medieval well was discovered.

On 1 June 1992, the building became the property of the Instituto Português do Património Arquitetónico (IPPA), under decree 106F/92 (Diário da República, Série 1A, 126). Further excavations in 2004, in the castle interior allowed the dating of structures to 10th century.

== Architecture ==

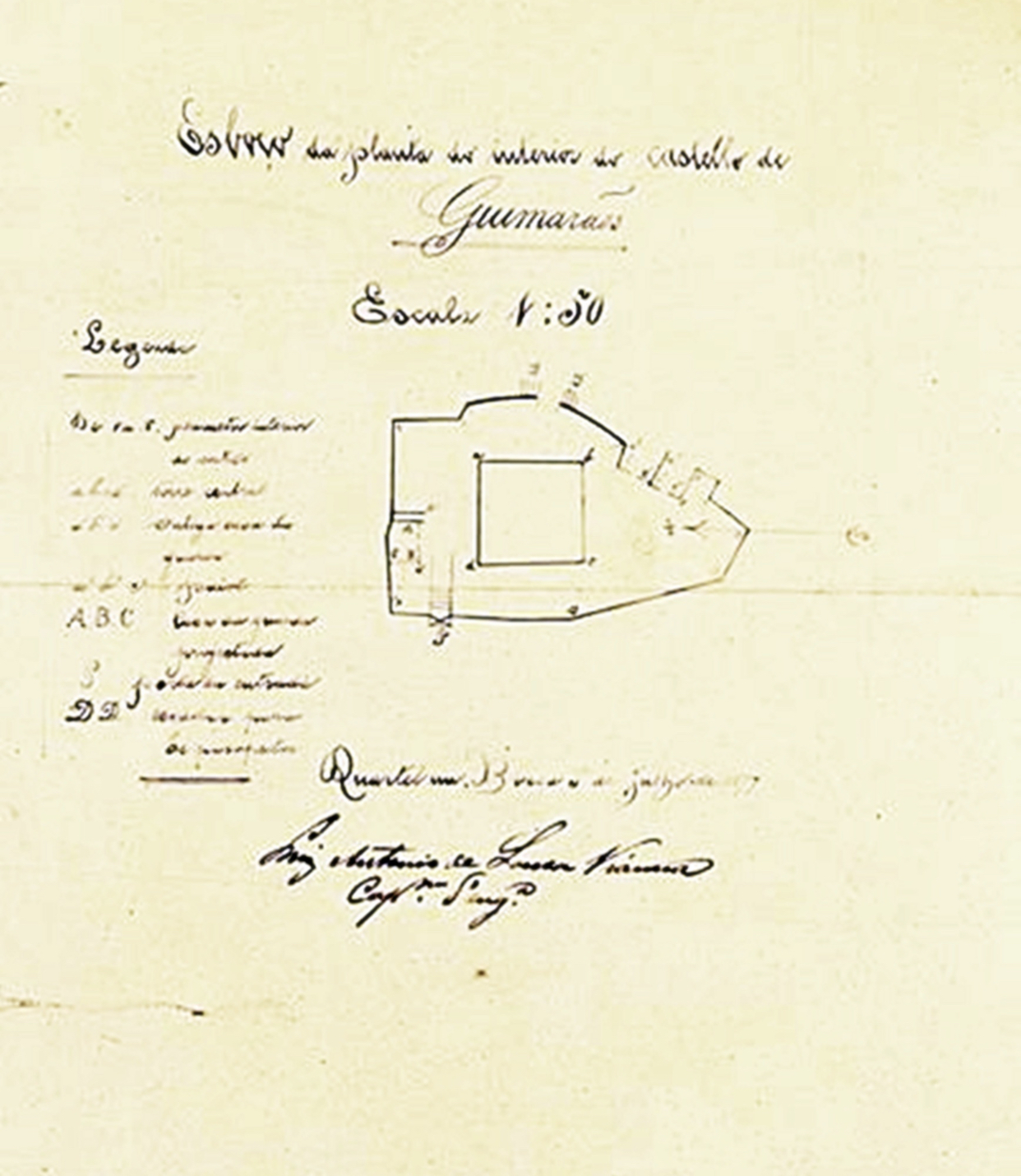
Blueprint showing the inner parts of the castle, 1877

The castle is located within the northern limits of the urban area of Guimarães, isolated on a small hill formed from granite, and encircled by a small forest park, accessed by several pedestrian trails. Alongside the southern tower is a bronze medallion of D. Afonso Henriques, over a large rock. In the vicinity, on the hillside, is the Romanesque church of São Miguel do Castelo, the Palace of the Dukes of Braganza and some sections of wall that surrounded the city, and that were originally integrated into the castle.

== Bibliography ==
- Almeida, Carlos; Ferreira, Alberto de (1986), Implantação do Românico: Arquitectura militar e civil in História da Arte em Portugal (in Portuguese), vol. 3, Lisbon, Portugal, pp. 132–145
- Barroca, Mário Jorge (1990–1991), "Do Castelo da Reconquista ao Castelo Românico (séc. IX a XII)", Portugália (in Portuguese), vol. XI–XII (Nova Série ed.), pp. 114–115
- Cachada, Armindo (1992), Guimarães: Roteiro Turístico (in Portuguese), Guimarães, Portugal
- Carvalho, A.L. (1937), Castelo de Guimarães: Sua História Dramática e Militar (in Portuguese), Guimarães, Portugal
- Forte, Joaquim (18 January 2004), "Encontrada no castelo estrutura edificada", Jornal de Notícias Minho (in Portuguese), p. 8
- García Álvarez, Manuel Rubén (1960). "¿La Reina Velasquita, nieta de Muniadomna Díaz?" (PDF). Work de Guimarães (70): 197–230. Archived from the original (PDF) on 2013-10-06.
- Gil, Júlio (1986), Os Mais Belos Castelos de Portugal (in Portuguese), Lisbon, Portugal
- Guimarães, Alfredo (1940), O Castelo e as Muralhas de Guimarães: Notícia Histórica (in Portuguese), Porto, Portugal
- Lacerda, AArão (1942), História da Arte em Portugal (in Portuguese), vol. 1, Porto, Portugal, OCLC 40678737
- Mattoso, José (1981). "As famílias condais portucalenses dos séculos X e XII". A nobreza medieval portuguesa: a família e o poder (in Portuguese). Lisbon: Editorial Estampa. OCLC 8242615.
- Pereira, Paulo (1995), História da Arte em Portugal (in Portuguese), vol. I, Lisbon, Portugal
- Pina, Luís de (1933), O Castelo de Guimarães (in Portuguese), Vila Nova de Gaia, Portugal
- DGEMN, ed. (1937), O Castelo de Guimarães (in Portuguese), Lisbon, Portugal: Direcção Geral dos Edifícios e Monumentos Nacionais
- Património Arquitectónico e Arqueológico Classificado, Inventário (in Portuguese), vol. II, Lisboa: Distrito de Braga, 1993, p. 47
- Relatório da Actividade do Ministério no ano de 1952 (in Portuguese), Lisbon, Portugal: Ministério das Obras Públicas, 1953
- Relatório da Actividade do Ministério no Ano de 1962 (in Portuguese), Lisbon, Portugal: Ministério das Obras Públicas, 1963
- Tesouros Artísticos de Portugal (in Portuguese), Lisbon, Portugal, 1976
