= O Comércio de Guimarães =

Newspaper from Guimarães, Portugal

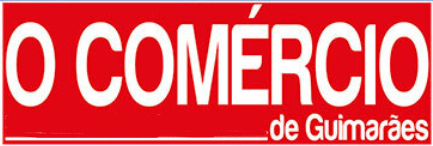
- Type: Weekly newspaper
- Owner: Santiago Group (Grupo Santiago)
- Founder: António Joaquim de Azevedo Machado
- Founded: May 15, 1884; 141 years ago
- Ceased publication: Temporarily from December 1985 to March 1986
- Headquarters: Guimarães
- Country: Portugal
- Website: https://www.guimaraesdigital.pt/index.php/grupo-santiago/o-comercio-de-guimaraes

O Comércio de Guimarães is a regionalist weekly newspaper from the city of Guimarães, in Portugal, whose first edition dates back to 1884.

== History ==
The first issue came out on 15 May 1884. It was founded and directed by António Joaquim de Azevedo Machado. It remained in the possession of his family until its publication was suspended in December 1985.

Its fortnightly publication was resumed in March 1986, on the initiative of the Santiago Group, the current owner, and it became a weekly publication in 1989.
