= Palace of the Dukes of Braganza =

Ducal Palace of the Braganza
- Paço dos Duques de Bragança
- Aerial view of the Palace

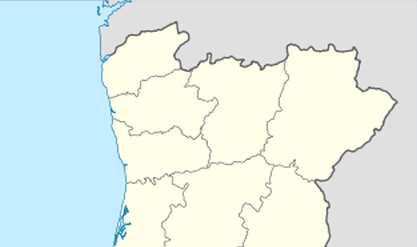
- Location within Norte Region, Portugal

General information
- Type: Palace
- Location: Guimarães, Portugal
- Coordinates: 41°26′47.27″N 8°17′27.64″W
- Opened: c. 1420
- Owner: Portuguese Republic

Technical details
- Material: Masonry

Design and construction
- Architect: Mestre Antom

Website
- www.pacodosduques.gov.pt

UNESCO World Heritage Site
- Part of: Historic Centre of Guimarães
- Criteria: Cultural: (ii), (iii), (iv)
- Reference: 1031
- Inscription: 2001 (25th Session)

The Ducal Palace of the Braganza or Palace of the Dukes of Braganza (Portuguese: Paço dos Duques de Bragança) is a medieval estate and former residence of the first Dukes of Braganza, located in the historical centre of Guimarães (Oliveira do Castelo), in the north-western part of Portugal.

It was initiated between 1420 and 1422 by Afonso, Count of Barcelos, the illegitimate son of John I of Portugal (and future Duke of Bragança), after his marriage to his second wife. His descendants would occupy the space until the Dukes of Braganza moved to Vila Viçosa, abandoning the palace. The 16th Century marked the beginning of period of ruin, which was aggravated during the 19th century, when the local population used the palace as a personal quarry. During the Estado Novo regime, a controversial restoration restored the Palace, while implying a grandeur that may not have existed. The Palace of the Dukes was classified as a National Monument (Portuguese: Monumento Nacional) in 1910, and has been an official residence for the Presidency.

== History ==
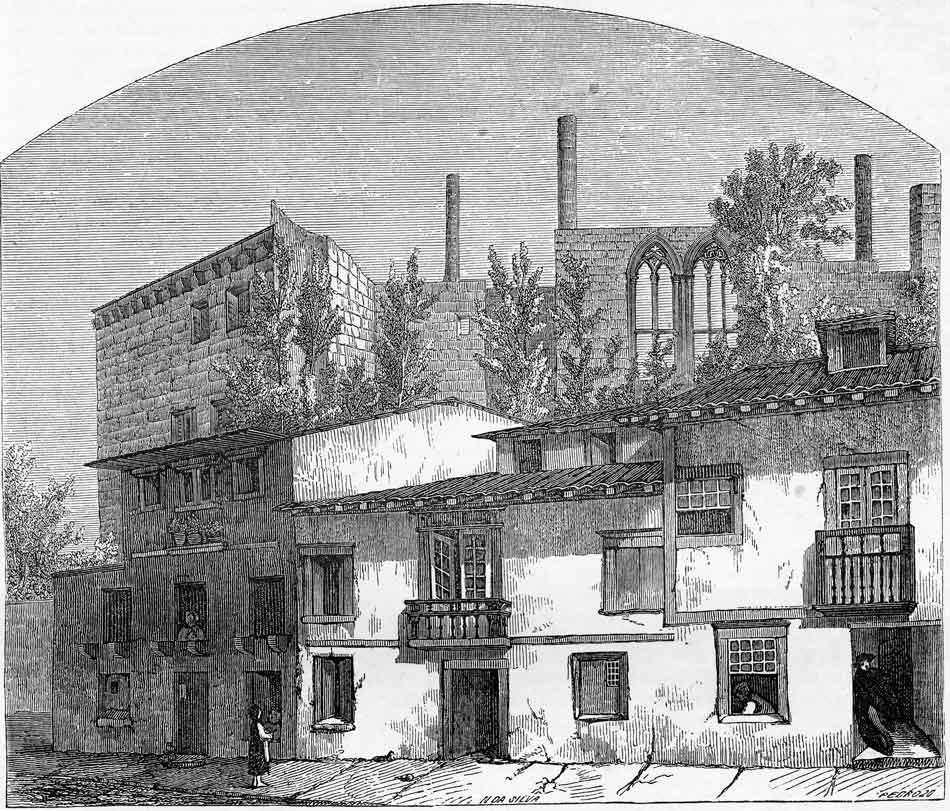
An engraving showing the ruins of the Paços dos Duques de Bragança

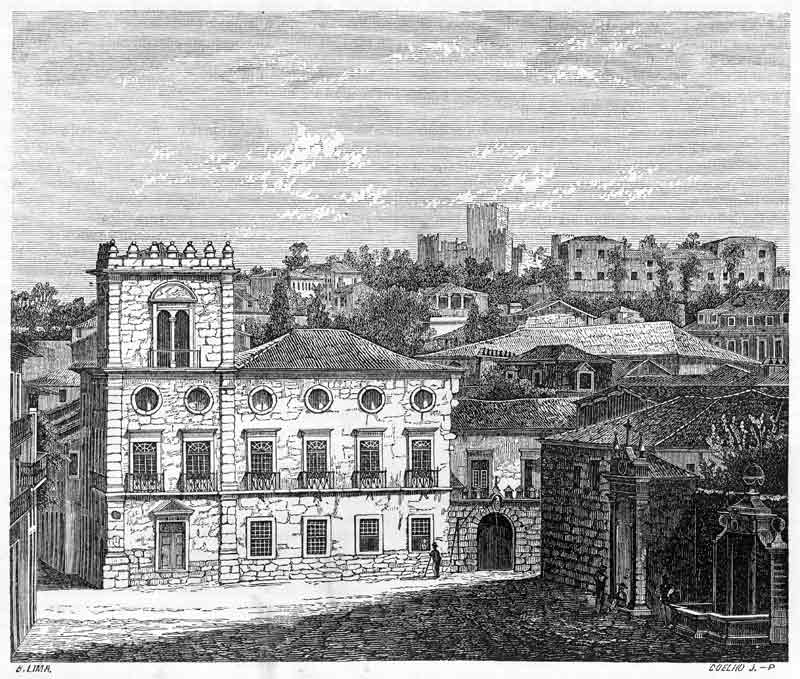
The Terreiro da Misericórdia, showing the shadowy figure of the Palace in the background (right)

The residence was ordered to be built in the first quarter of the 15th century (likely 1420 to 1422) by Afonso, Count of Barcelos, the illegitimate son of John, and future Duke of Braganza, following his return to Portugal after a series of diplomatic missions to the Courts of France, Venice, Aragon and Castile. The construction of this building marked the concretization of his second marriage, when he took residence in the town. The project was given, as some authors have suggested, to French architect Antom. Yet, by 1442, it was still under construction when the Regent Peter came to Guimarães and stayed at the Palace, at the time conferring on his half-brother the title of 1st Duke of Braganza. The commission continued into 1461, when Afonso died: the property and titles passed on to his brother, Fernando, although the widow, Constança de Noronha, continued to live at the residence and received the land rents from the holdings in Guimarães.

In 1464, the title of Count of Guimarães is given to Fernando II, son of the Duke of Braganza, by King Afonso V (which was later renovated in 1475). Three years later, on 1 April 1478, the 2nd Duke of Branganza, died, followed two years later by the death of the widow of the 1st Duke of Braganza: the titles and vast land holdings passed on to Fernando II. During the 16th century there was a move towards monumental construction, increasing at the time the main floor over the principal gate. This was a period when the second Duke of Braganza, Fernando who pushed for a symmetrical design and layout. The functional organization of the spaces, dates from these renovations and included: the first floor, its servants' quarters and support rooms, and the second floor, that was devoted to the residence of the nobles, structured around the chapel and divided into individual spaces for the Duke and Duchess. But, Fernando's move to Vila Viçosa during the 16th century, meant that the residence was closed for long periods. Most records on the buildings construction include the fact that the Palace was incomplete at the time that it was abandoned: Father Torcato Peixoto de Azevedo indicated that the residence had never really been completed in his Memórias (1692); which was also complemented by Father António de Carvalho da Costa (1706), who mentioned the same in his work Corografia Portuguesa; and Father Manuel da Mialhada also referred to the incomplete Palace of the Dukes. Transcribed in 1900 by Albano Bellino, a 29 December 1761 document indicated the plan and elevation of the Palace, without referencing the central courtyard.

King John II at the time was very interested in curbing the seigneurial power of the nobility and concentrating his power. Fernando (supported by the King's cousin, the Infante Diogo, Duke of Viseu) protested and conspired with Isabella I of Castile, which resulted in his being accused of treason by King John II, when the Duke's correspondence was intercepted by the King's spies. By order of the King, the Duke's properties and possessions were confiscated, and his residence in Guimarães continued to be looked after as Crown property, even as Duke Fernando was judged and executed on 20 June 1483 in Évora. The house was cared for by carpenters João Domingos, and later his son-in-law Afonso Anes, who were appointed to head the renovations of the property by John II.

In 1496, the properties of the House of Braganza were restored to Fernando II's oldest son Jaime, three years after returning from exile in Spain. Yet, Jaime chose to remain in Vila Viçosa after the family restoration, and as a result, the residence in Guimarães were closed.

The Dukedom of Guimarães was given as dowry to Isabel, sister of the 5th Duke Teodósio I, in her marriage to her cousin the Infante Edward (on 21 August 1536), thus-by passing the palace onto a peripheral branch of hereditary successors to the House of Aviz.

A century later, the space began a slow decline, which began innocently enough. On 20 October 1611, the Poor Clares nuns requested rock and stone from around the palace in order to repair their monastery. A similar request was made in 1666 by the Order of Friars Minor Capuchin to King Afonso VI (10th Duke of Braganza), to utilize rock from the interior walls of the palace to construct the Convent of Piedade. On January 31, the municipal chamber intervened over the destruction occurring to the Palace, and on 4 February inspected and evaluated its condition in order to inform the King of the need to conserve its structure. The local government purposed funding the friars, and providing the stone from the barbican in the Castle of Guimarães, in exchange for stone in the Palace. As conditions continued to deteriorate the municipal chamber requested the roaming magistrate determine who stole stone from near the gate of Santa Cruz. On 26 November 1672, Pedro Vaz de Sampaio, master mason, was requested to replace the gate, since it was already ruined. There was a profound degradation in the following centuries, with more and more of its stone taken for construction in the city and its re-purposing as a barracks in 1807. At that time, the inhabitable part of the Palace was retiled by the almoxarife Jerónimo de Matos Feijó and served as the barracks for the 20th Regimental Infantry.

Several public works were completed on 8 January 1819. By 30 December 1880, its importance as a historical building was made clear by the Portuguese Royal Association of Civil Architects and Archeologists (Portuguese: Real Associação de Arquitectos Civis e Arqueólogos Portugueses), as a second-order historical monument.

Father António José Ferreira Caldas, writing in 1881, referred to the site as being in a state of ruins, serving as a barracks for various regiments and battalions. He made detailed description of what existed, including the grande courtyard, its main façade with one floor, lateral and posterior façades slightly taller, chapel door, the columns that supported the courtyard's gallery, its Flemish stained-glass windows in the chapel and diverse tiled chimneys. This was complimented in a similar report in 1886 by Vilhena Barbosa who also mentioned the columns in the northeastern lateral façade that supported the porch.

=== Republic ===
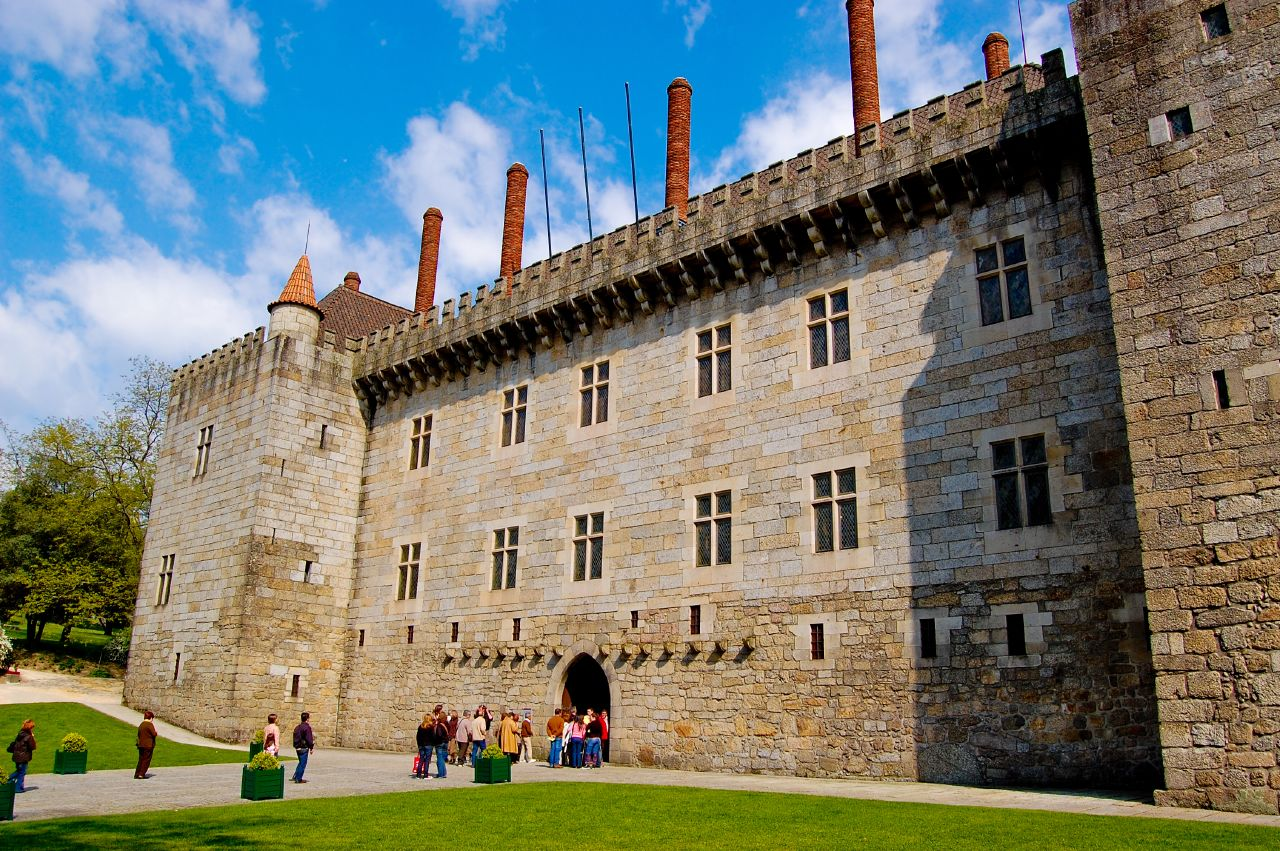
The front façade of the Palace, with its main gate

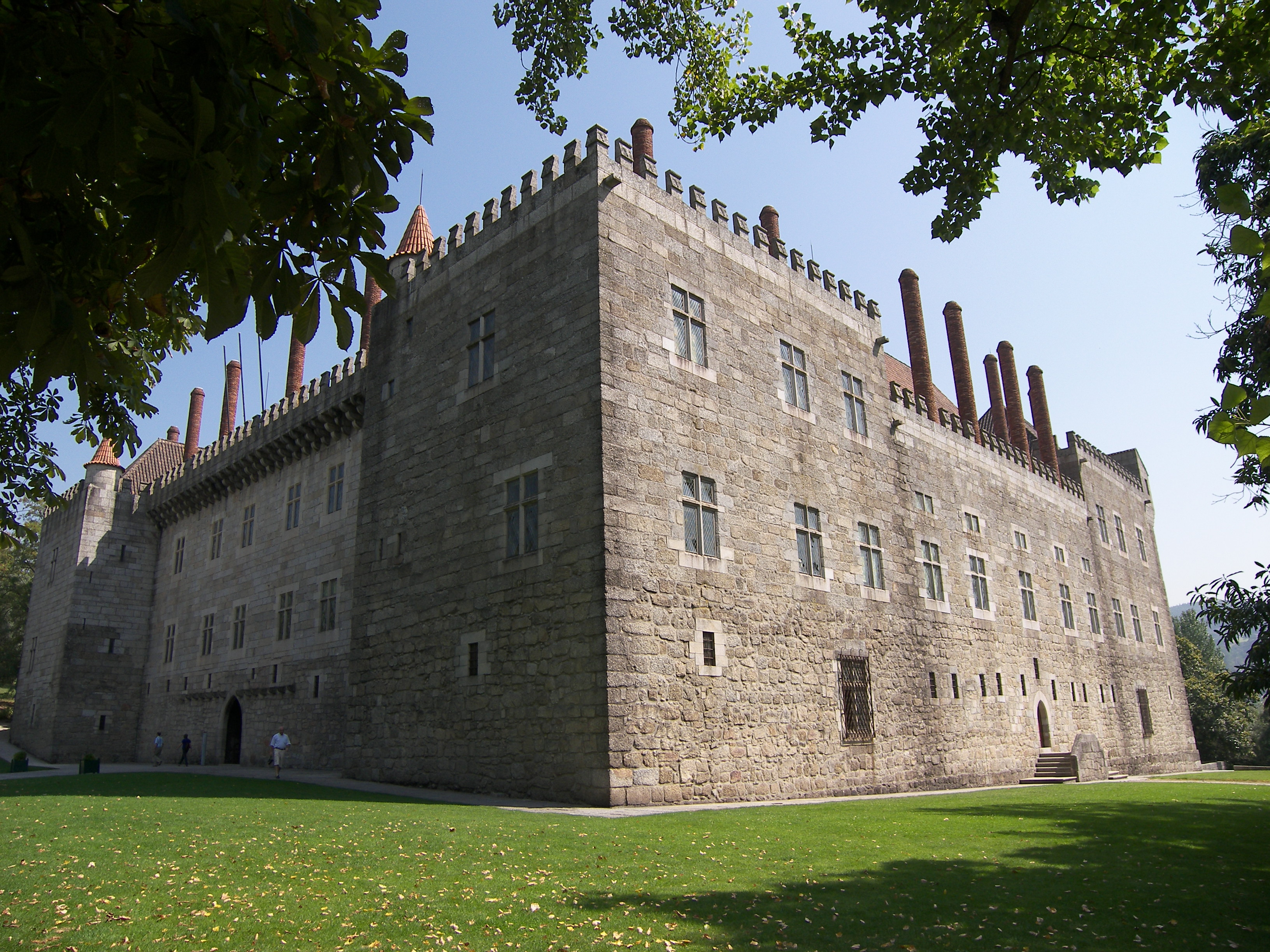
The southeast corner of the Palace, showing a clear division between building styles

At the beginning of the 20th century, the medieval structure was irredeemably corrupted.

On 26 September 1933, the conservational director of the Alberto Sampaio Museum, Dr. Alfredo Guimarães, requested from António de Oliveira Salazar visit the ruined palace, which helped to motivate the reconstruction of the building. Architect Rogério de Azevedo was commissioned in 1936 to complete the restoration, forcing the abandonment of the space by the military. What would become a radical restoration was started in 1937, under the architect Rogério de Azevedo, which was both restorative and controversial.

In 1940, a statue of Afonso Henriques is transferred to the ramp/entranceway of the Palace, alongside Rua Conde D. Afonso Henriques, by the municipal authority.

The restoration was based on the analysis of other medieval palaces of the period, but influenced by the monumentalism of the period architects. As part of the ongoing restoration, the courtyard railing from the Monastery of São Miguel de Refojos is recycled for the palace in 1943. Also, as part of the project, in 1952 and again in 1955, the architects travelled to Brussels, Antwerp and to Loire region, to study the decorative solutions for the palace. Further, there was a confluence of other styles and motifs associated with the Estado Novo regime, including a politico-religious nationalism that saw Guimarães as the centre of the modern Portuguese nation. It is not surprising, therefore, that the Palace was later transformed into an official residence of the Presidente do Conselho and President of the Republic.

In 1957, the landscaping of the space is undertaken (which also included the Campo de São Mamede) by landscape architect António Viana Barreto. As the restoration of the building was coming to an end, in 1958, the chapel was renovated (by sculptor Manuel Ventura Teixeira and Pintor António Lino) and the furniture was collected and installed by the Comissão para Aquisição de Mobiliário (Commission for Furniture Acquisition) in 1959.

By 24 June 1959, the new Palace of the Dukes of Braganza was inaugurated and finally open to the public.

Pastrana Tapestries displayed at the Palace of the Dukes of Braganza

Today, part of the property has been reconverted into a Museum, whose collection and disposition are to educate the public on its history during the 16th and 17th century. In its vast collection, are the tapestries of Pastrana, which narrate some of the events in North African conquests, attributed to Nuno Gonçalves (author of the polyptych in the Monastery of São Vicente de Fora; a collection of porcelains from the Portuguese East India Company; a group of Portuguese dinner sets from important factories (such as Prado, Viana, Rocha Soares and Rato); and a collection of Flemish tapestries by Peter Paul Rubens, among others.

== Architecture ==
The Palace is located in the urban setting of the historic centre of Guimarães on the top of Monte Latito, encircled by a forested park and green-space, intersected by several pedestrian trails. In its proximity to the southeast, the Chapel of Santa Cruz, to the north the Church of São Miguel do Castelo and the Castle of Guimarães. In a space to the left of the main ramp/entranceway is a monument erected to Afonso Henriques.

=== Exterior ===
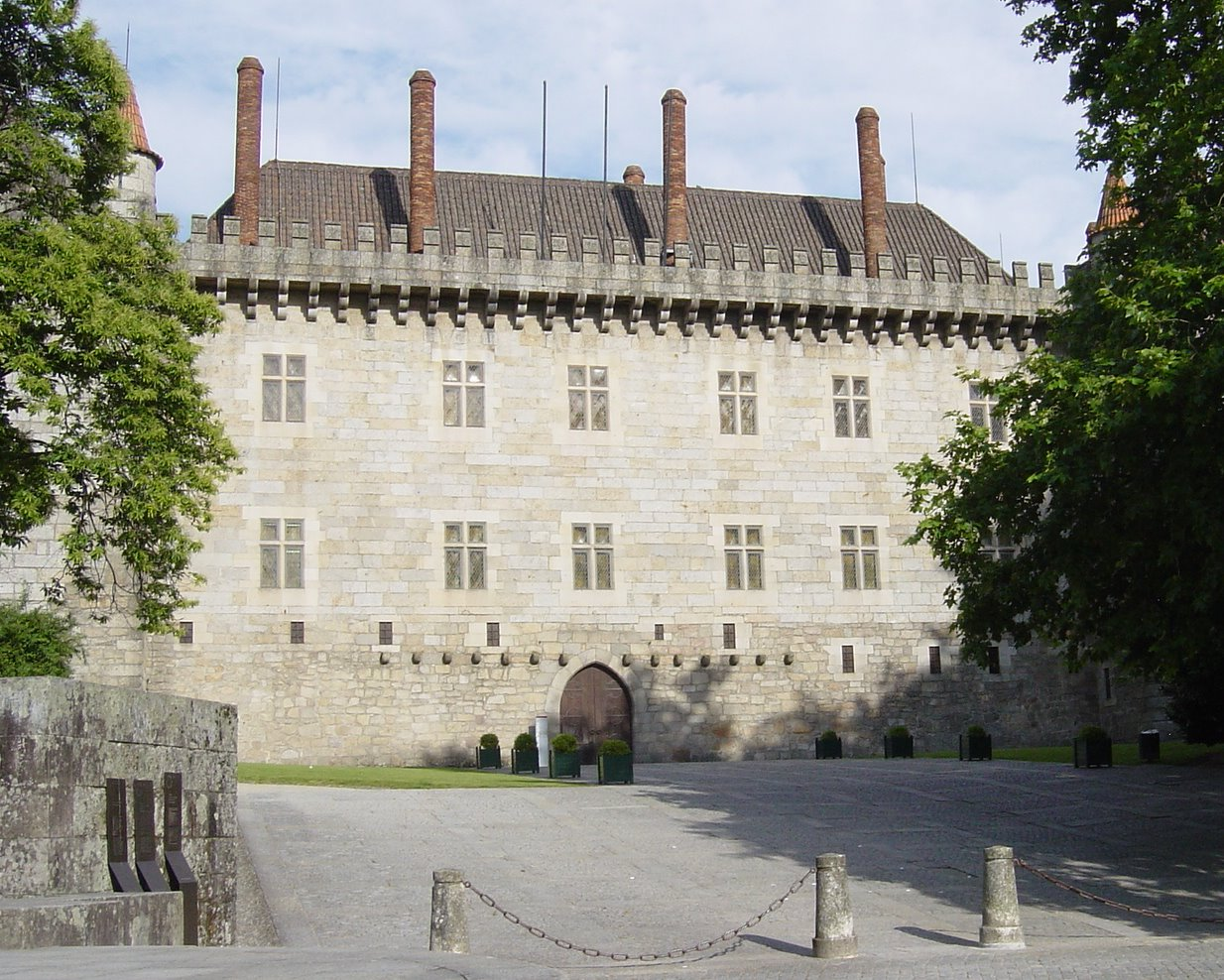
The main entrance and ramp showing the two floors and entrance

Structured around a central rectangular courtyard, the lateral buildings housing the official residences, while a chapel is located opposite the entrance. Its simple/basic form is one of the best examples of Portuguese late-medieval construction used by the nobility, comparable to the 14th century French palaces/buildings of the time. It was also used as an example for the Palace of the Kings of Majorca, in Perpignan, of which it is a faithful model.

The plan developed around a rectangular building with four rectangular towers, around an interior courtyard dominated by the chapel on the southeast wing. The spaces are articulated and staggered horizontal floors, covered with different roof tiles, in addition to with six tall chimneys. Each façades is made of granite, masonry block and interspersed by rectangular windows of varying styles: cruciform, stained-glass, standard and oblique. A few of the first floor windows are covered in metal grating. The northwest façade has an arch doorway surmounted by corbels and is recessed from the two towers. The superior floor is a balcony that runs the length of the interior courtyard, supported by corbels, which unite the guard towers. The lateral (northeast and southwest) façades are of a lower height and covered by trim and corbels, that supports the covered balcony, interspersed by openings at floor level. The southwest wing is broken by the body of the chapel, which extends away from the façade (identifiable by two large Flemish stained-glass windows), and is highlighted by a cantilever roof within the courtyard.

The towers are all closed rectangular bodies, with watchtowers, interspersed by small windows.

The courtyard and chapel entrance, showing the Romanesque era portico and exaggerated influences dating from the Estado Novo era

The interior patio, accessible from the main doorway, is a balcony that overlooks the courtyard: supported by Gothic arches on the main floor and columns on the second. At the roof-line, on all interior façades are balconies supported by granite corbels, while the chapel-side façade is highlighted by two isolated balconies (covered by tiled awnings) supported by similar corbels. The same façade is highlighted by a cantilever roof, supported by a rounded wooden arch and two supports decorated with columns. In the interior of this awning is a portal (consisting of four inset arches) preceded by a staircase, which gives access to the chapel. The gallery is covered by masonry stone on the main floor, and tiles on the second, with interior covering in wood.

=== Interior ===
Interior of the chapel at the Palace of the Dukes of Braganza

The austere interior spaces include simple granite walls with ceilings and floors in wood.

Spaces on the first floor are divided into several rooms, separated by narrow corridors that run perpendicular to the façades. In these spaces are the visitors reception area, storage, carpenters space, main hall and office of the director of the site. In the main wing is the unique staircase in the palace, consisting of four flights in granite.

The intermediary floor, corresponds to the museum space, consisting of the towers and halls with rock fireplaces, including the Salão de Banquetes (Banquet Hall) and the Salão dos Passos Perdidos ("Hall of Lost Steps"), with roofs designed like the interior wooden keel of a boat.

The last floor, was dedicated for the use of the President of the Republic, and is characterized by a succession of bedrooms with private bathrooms, between two suites located within the towers (for the President and Prime Minister. This floor is immediately accessible via the small elevator on the ground floor and staircase from the second floor cloister.

The last floor of the posterior wing is marked by a succession of rooms and the chapel. The chapel has a single nave, which is covered by a wooden ceiling presenting visible joists. A straight narrow wooden choir, allows access to balconies which extend to the front of the church and the exterior facade, as well as the corridors of the remaining wards. The richly carved wood benches in the nave precede the elevated presbytery, which is delimited by a wooden guardrail.
