= Ludeiros =

Village in Galicia, Spain

Coordinates: 41.880°N 8.142°W

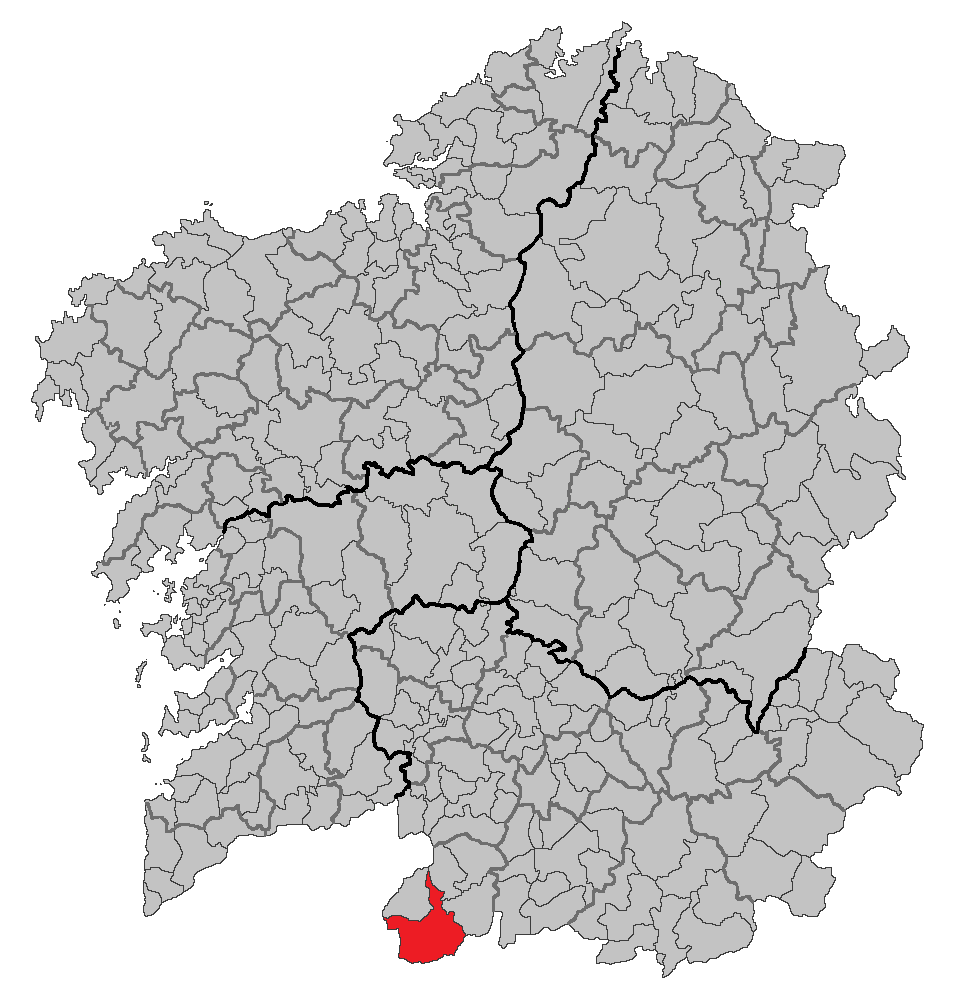
Ourense in Galicia

Ludeiros is a village in northwestern Spain in Ourense Province, and the autonomous region of Galicia. The village is in the municipality of Lobios and in the hills of the Peneda-Gerês National Park. It overlooks the Lindoso Reservoir, with the Rio Limia being the main river that drains into and out of the reservoir. Ludeiros is less than 500 metres (550 yd) from the Spanish-Portuguese border. The village is home to 35 residents.
