= Scaevia gens =

Ancient Roman family

The gens Scaevia was an obscure plebeian family at ancient Rome. Few members of this gens are mentioned in ancient writers, but several are known from inscriptions.

== Origin ==
The nomen Scaevius is derived from the cognomen Scaeva, left-handed, or by extension someone strongly affected by fate, whether for good or ill. The nomina Scaevinius and Scaevilius seem to have been derived from the same root, either from the derivative cognomen Scaevinus, or directly from Scaevius, using the gentile-forming suffixes -inius and -ilius.

== Praenomina ==
The Scaevii used a wide variety of the most common praenomina, including Lucius, Gaius, Marcus, Publius, and Quintus, as well as the more distinctive Manius. Aulus, a common name, and Numerius, relatively uncommon, are found in a filiation.

== Branches and cognomina ==
There is no evidence that the Scaevii were ever divided into distinct families. Their cognomina all appear to have been personal surnames, many of which were the original names of freedmen who had assumed Roman names upon their manumission. Among the other surnames of this family, Laevinus, left-handed, alludes to the etymology of the nomen Scaevius. Maximus was a common surname typically given to an eldest son, or to the most illustrious member of a family. Cervinus is derived from cervus, a stag, and belongs to a common type of cognomen derived from familiar objects and animals. Hospes, a host, belongs to a class of surname deriving from the character or occupation of an individual.

== Members ==
This list includes abbreviated praenomina. For an explanation of this practice, see filiation.

- Publius Scaevius, one of the soldiers in Caesar's command, when he was governor of Hispania in 60 BC.
- Scaevius Cervinus, built a tomb at Rome for himself, his wife, Papiria Primitiva, and their son.
- Scaevia Chreste, a freedwoman named in an inscription from Rome.
- Gaius Scaevius Curiatius, one of the municipal duumvirs at Veii in AD 26.
- Scaevia A. N. l. Fausta, a freedwoman named in an inscription from Rome.
- Manius Scaevius Hospes, named in an inscription from Rome.
- Scaevia Italia, named in an inscription from Rome.
- Lucius Scaevius L. f. Laevinus, named in an inscription from Clusium in Etruria.
- Quintus Scaevius Maximus, a frumentarius, or quartermaster, serving in the seventh legion, who dedicated a monument at Rome to his colleague, Lucius Pontius Nigrinus, a native of Bracara in Lusitania.
- Scaevius Nicephorus, a freedman named in an inscription from Rome.
- Manius Scaevius Stephanus, a freedman named in an inscription from Rome.
- Marcus Scaevius Vaelio, named as tesserarius, or officer of the day, in an uncertain cohort, named in a libationary inscription from Aquae Originae in Hispania Tarraconensis.

== See also ==
- List of Roman gentes

== Bibliography ==
- Lucius Cassius Dio Cocceianus (Cassius Dio), Roman History.
- Dictionary of Greek and Roman Biography and Mythology, William Smith, ed., Little, Brown and Company, Boston (1849).
- Theodor Mommsen et alii, Corpus Inscriptionum Latinarum (The Body of Latin Inscriptions, abbreviated CIL), Berlin-Brandenburgische Akademie der Wissenschaften (1853–present).
- Giovanni Battista de Rossi, Inscriptiones Christianae Urbis Romanae Septimo Saeculo Antiquiores (Christian Inscriptions from Rome of the First Seven Centuries, abbreviated ICUR), Vatican Library, Rome (1857–1861, 1888).
- George Davis Chase, "The Origin of Roman Praenomina", in Harvard Studies in Classical Philology, vol. VIII, pp. 103–184 (1897).
- Hispania Epigraphica (Epigraphy of Spain), Madrid (1989–present).
- John C. Traupman, The New College Latin & English Dictionary, Bantam Books, New York (1995).
