= Touvedo Dam =

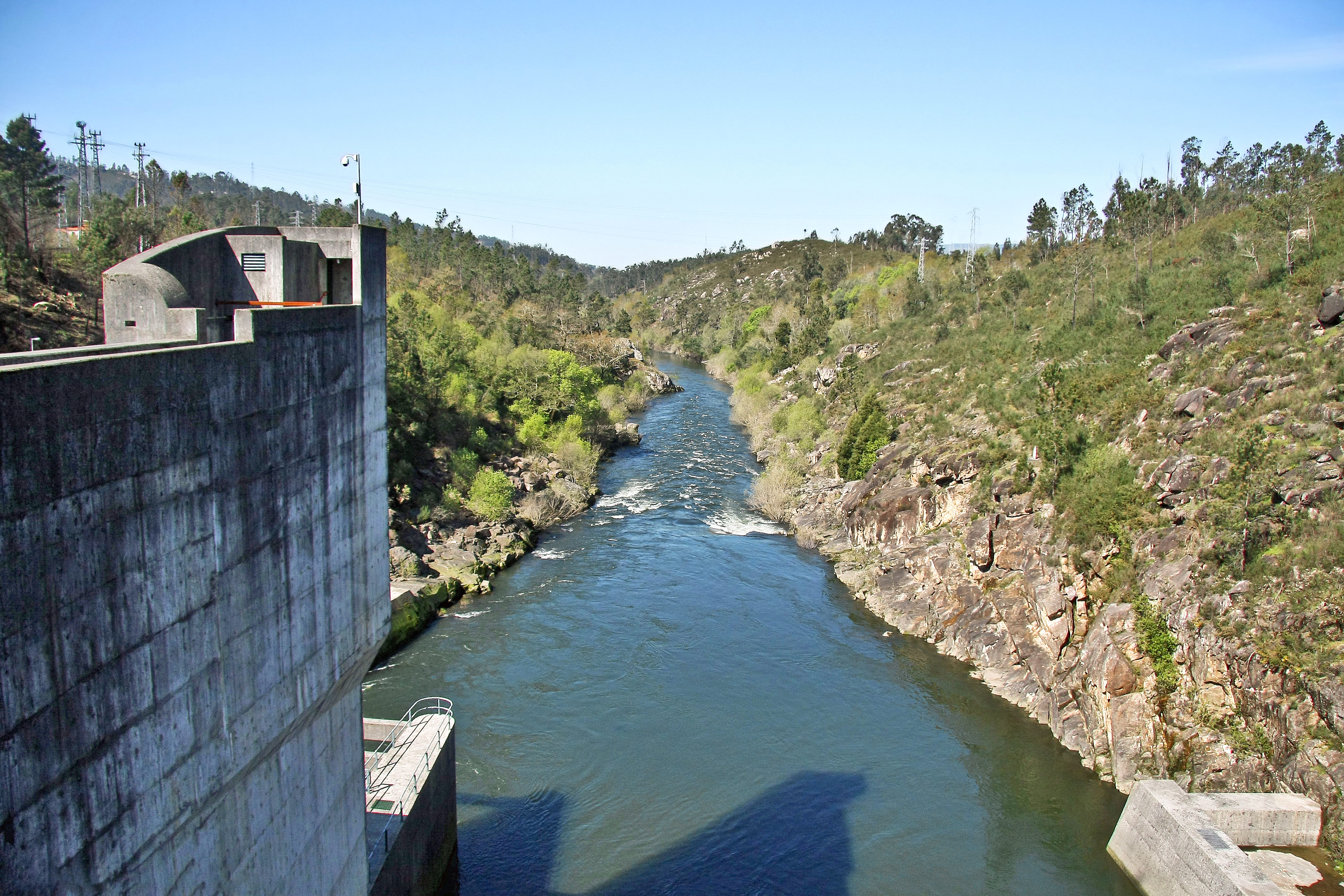

- Location within Portugal
- Official name: Barragem de Touvedo
- Country: Portugal
- Location: Ponte da Barca and Arcos de Valdevez, Viana do Castelo District
- Coordinates: 41°48′44.9″N 8°21′13.5″W
- Purpose: Power, irrigation, flood control
- Status: Operational
- Construction began: 1987
- Opening date: 1993
- Owner: Companhia Portuguesa de Produção de Electricidade
- Operator: Energias de Portugal

Dam and spillways
- Type of dam: Concrete gravity dam
- Impounds: Limia
- Height (foundation): 42.5 m (139 ft)
- Length: 133.5 m (438 ft)
- Elevation at crest: 55 m (180 ft)
- Dam volume: 74,620 m^{3} (2,635,000 cu ft)
- Spillway type: Over the dam
- Spillway capacity: 3,200 m^{3}/s (110,000 cu ft/s)

Reservoir
- Total capacity: 15,500,000 m^{3} (12,600 acre⋅ft)
- Active capacity: 4,500,000 m^{3} (3,600 acre⋅ft)
- Surface area: 1.72 km^{2} (0.66 mi^{2})
- Normal elevation: 50 m (160 ft)

Power Station
- Operator: Energias de Portugal
- Commission date: 1993
- Hydraulic head: 25 m (82 ft) (max)
- Turbines: 1 x 22.2 MW Kaplan-type
- Installed capacity: 22 MW
- Annual generation: 66.8 GWh

Touvedo Dam (Portuguese: Barragem de Touvedo) is a concrete gravity dam on the Limia. It is located in the municipalities of Ponte da Barca and Arcos de Valdevez, in Viana do Castelo District, Portugal.

Construction of the dam began in 1987. The dam was completed in 1993. It is owned by Companhia Portuguesa de Produção de Electricidade (CPPE). The dam is used for power generation, irrigation and flood control.

== Dam ==
Touvedo Dam is a 42.5 m tall (height above foundation) and 133.5 m long gravity dam with a crest altitude of 55 m. The volume of the dam is 74,620 m^{3}. The spillway with 3 cradial gates is part of the dam body (maximum discharge 3,200 m^{3}/s). There is also a bottom outlet which can discharge up to 50 m^{3}/s.

== Reservoir ==
At full reservoir level of 50 m the reservoir of the dam has a surface area of 1.72 km^{2} and a total capacity of 15.5 mio. m^{3}. The active capacity is 4.5 (4.0) mio. m^{3}. Minimum operating level is 47.5 m.

The reservoir of Touvedo Dam serves as lower reservoir for the Alto Lindoso pumped-storage power plant.

== Power plant ==
The hydroelectric power plant was commissioned in 1993. It is operated by EDP. The plant has a nameplate capacity of 22 MW. Its average annual generation is 66.8 (61, 67, or 78) GWh.

The power station contains one Kaplan turbine-generator with 22.2 MW (24 MVA) in a dam powerhouse located on the left side of the dam. The turbine rotation is 187.5 rpm. The minimum hydraulic head is 20 m, the maximum 25 m. Maximum flow per turbine is 100 m^{3}/s.

The turbine and generator were provided by GEC-Alstom.

== See also ==
- List of power stations in Portugal
- List of dams and reservoirs in Portugal
