= Church of São Salvador (Bravães) =

- Parochial Church of Bravães
- Igreja de São Salvador
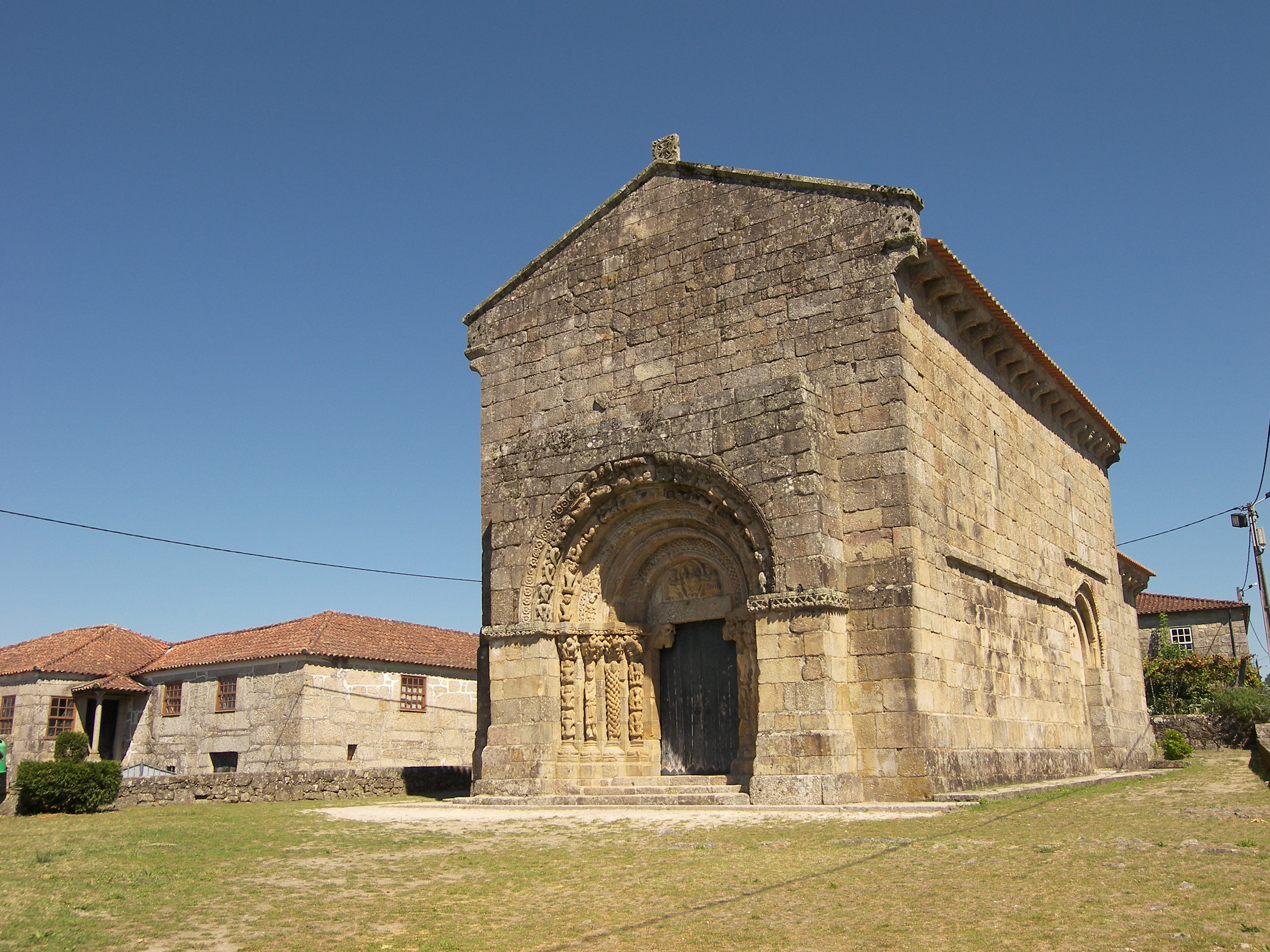
- The long oblique facade of the austere Romanesque church of Bravães
- Church of São Salvador
- 41°47′52.3″N 8°27′11.3″W
- Location: Viana do Castelo, Alto Minho, Norte
- Country: Portugal

Architecture
- Architect: Baltazar de Castro
- Style: Romanesque

The Church of São Salvador (Portuguese: Mosteiro de Bravães/Igreja de Bravães/Igreja de São Salvador) is a Romanesque era Portuguese religious building located in the civil parish of Bravães, municipality of Ponte da Barca, in the northern Portuguese district of Viana do Castelo.

== History ==
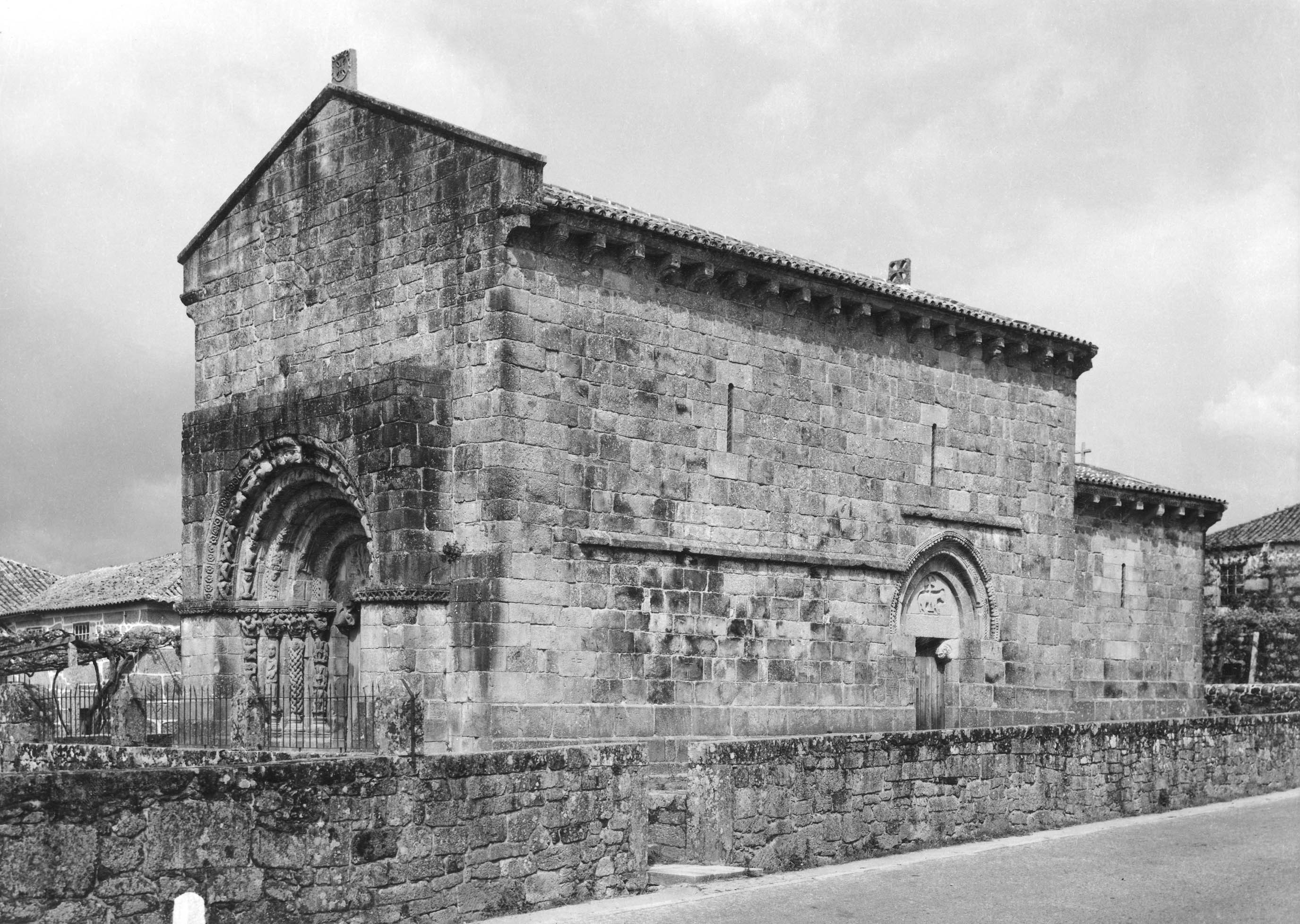
The lateral facade of the church, identifiable for its long nave and austere Romanesque decoration

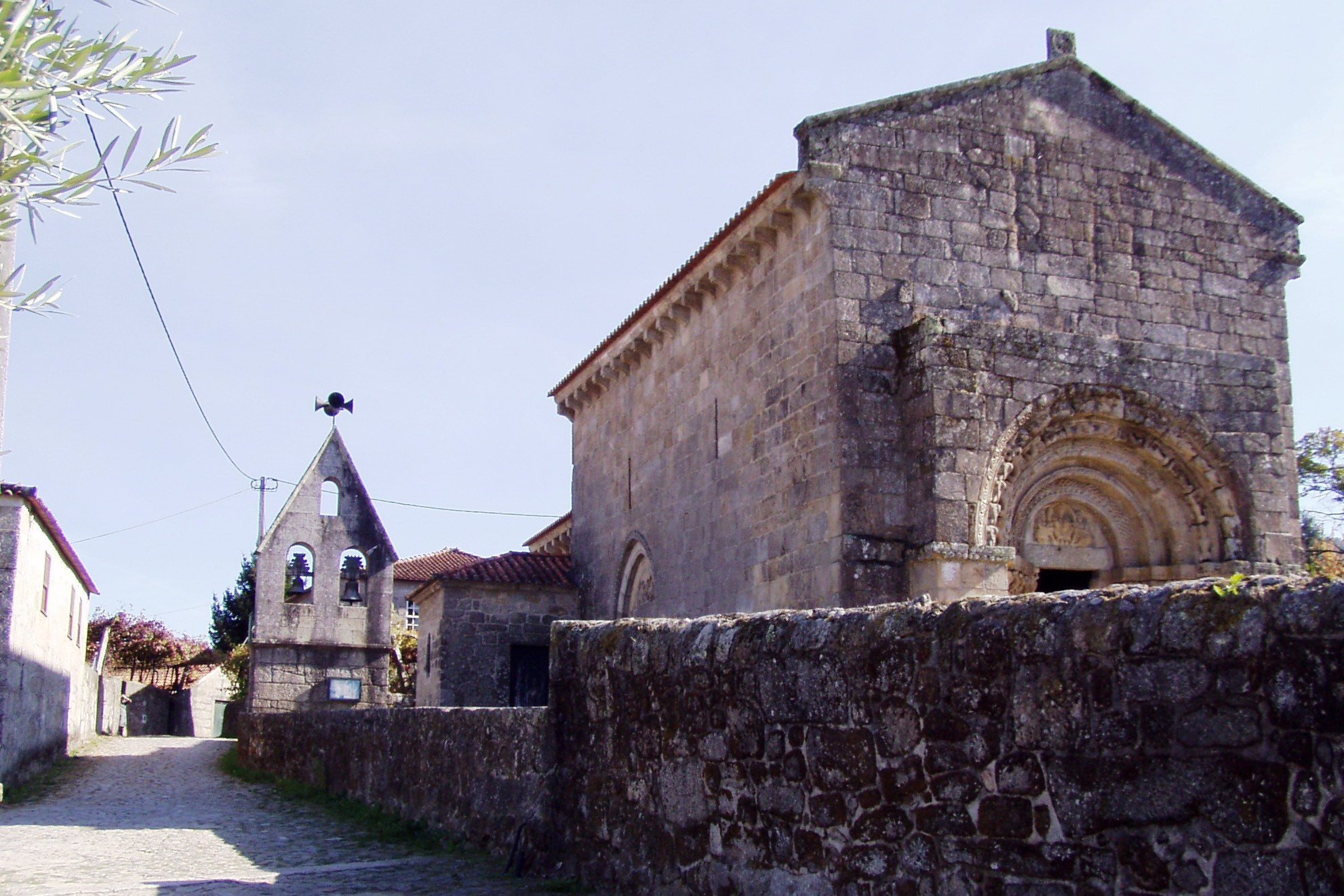
The oblique lateral facade (opposite the Estrada Nacional) with the bell tower to the rear

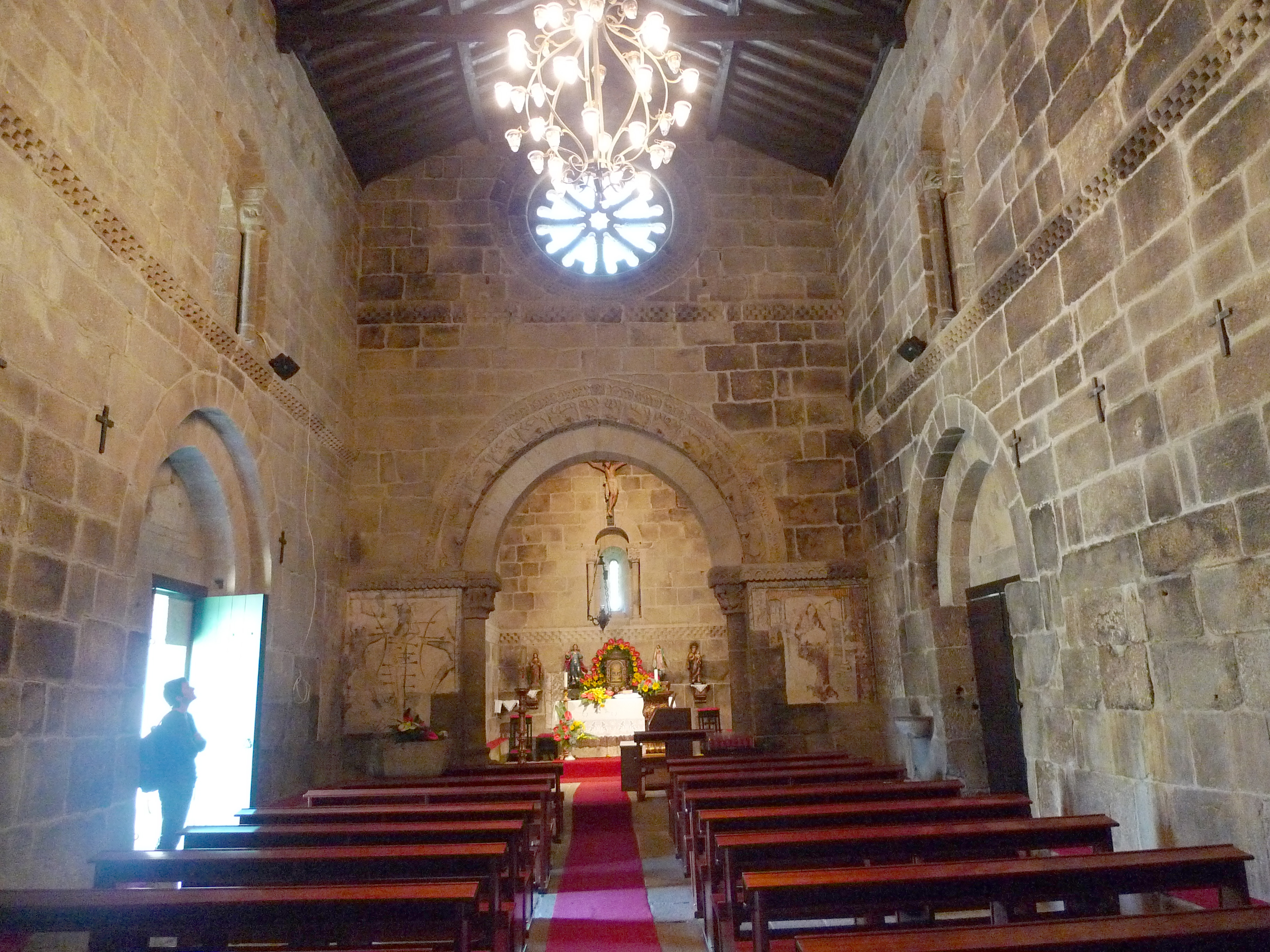
The nave interior showing the triumphal arch flanked by two murals and main altar

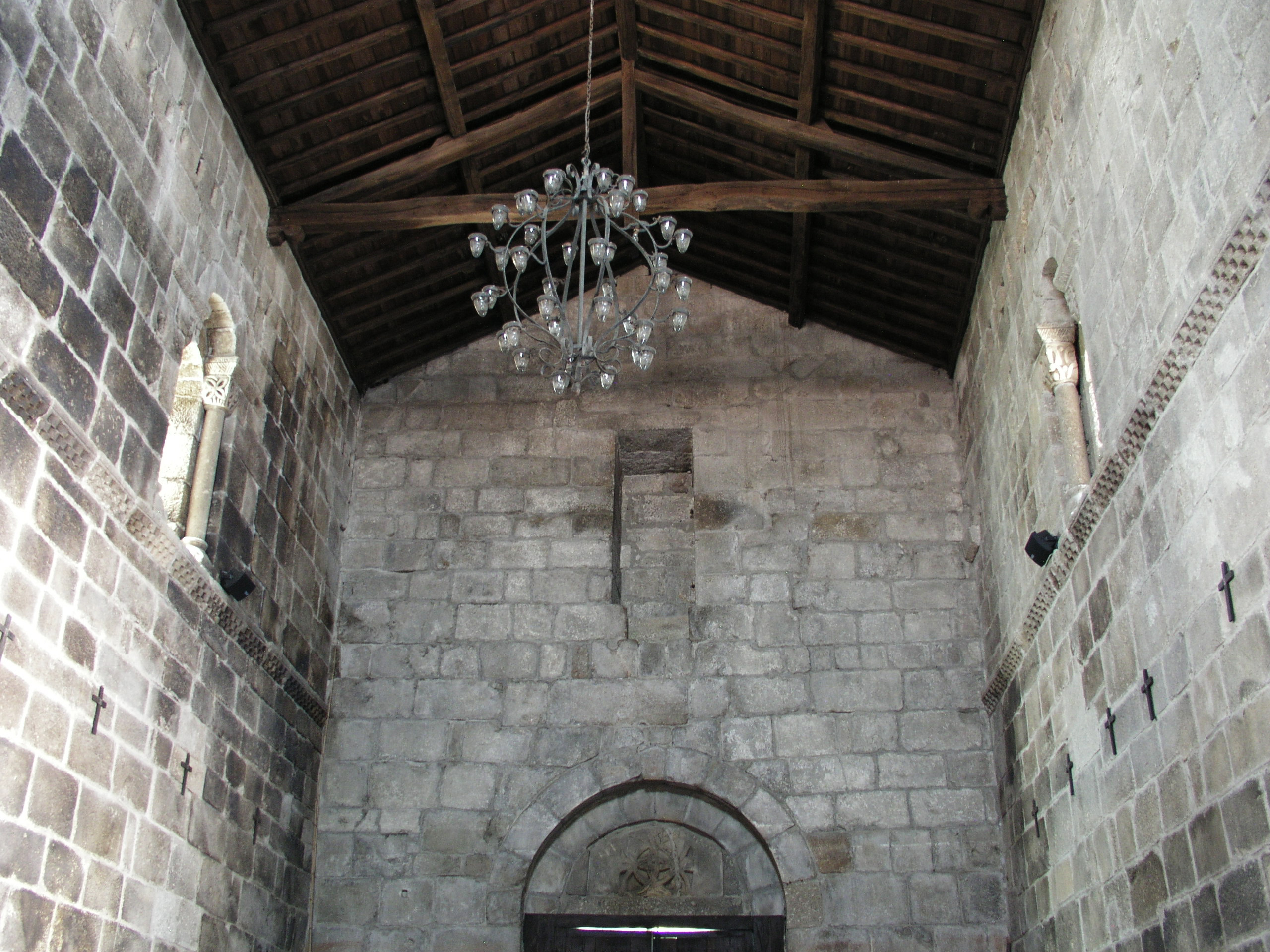
Over the main doorway is the slit or niche surmounting the sculpted cord of Solomon and archivolt

The date indicated for the foundation of the institution in Bravães was 1080. An 1140/1141 letter between D. Afonso Henriques and Prior Egeas (who was notary) on the transaction for the monastery of Villa Nova de Muia, suggests a level of importance for the monastery. By 28 July 1180, the monastery at Bravães was already autonomous; from a letter by Avelino de Jesus da Costa, it had already been granted special privileges by the same monarch. In the 1258 Inquirições (Inquiries) identified it as a Couto granted by D. Afonso Henriques to D. Pelágio Velasquez.

By the end of the 13th century, following an inscription in the church, prior D. Rodrigo ordered the construction of the northern tower.

The Commandery of Bravães was transferred from the Order of the Knights Templar to the Order of Christ, who remained at the site until the beginning of the 15th century. Of the monastery of Bravães, only the church remains, and was reconstructed completely during the first half of the 13th century.

By letter dated 1420, Bishop of Braga D. Martinho V secularized the institution's monastic and instructional services, resulting in the institutionalization by D. Fernando da Guerra of a secular rectory. It was succeeded on 12 February 1434 by the de-institutionalization of the monastery to the status of parochial church.

Around 1500 the mural painting with the depiction of São Salvador was completed. Between 1540 and 1550, other mural paintings were executed, most notably the Martírio de São Sebastião (Martyr of St. Sebastian), and by the end of the last quarter of the 15th century, the probable work on the main chapel and the execution of the pictorial composition of the religious patron and paintings along the nave. A triptych over the main chapel was also added at the beginning of the 16th century, along with grotesque 1535 Romanesque paintings (images similar to that of Nossa Senhora da Azinheira in Outeiro Seco) and other paintings in the nave.

In 1639, the lands alongside the main chapel were annexed by local.

On 27 November 1755, there was a contract signed to remodel the church between Francisco Vieira Pinto (Lisboeta businessman and Solicitor for the Kingdom) and carpenter Tomás de Araújo (resident of Ponte da Barca) and Jerónimo da Costa (resident of Pedreiro/Bravães) for 147$000 rési. The work included adjustments to the church roof, a staircase to the choir, ceiling and all the church's interior woods, to be completed in chestnut: the painting of the ceiling would be the responsibility of carpenters.

This work became a function of the civil parish of Bravães later, as on 12 January 1843, they established a budget to be used in the maintenance of the parochial church.

In the middle of the 20th century, work on the church was carried-out under the direction of architect Baltazar de Castro.

Beginning in 1931, the DGEMN Direcção-Geral de Edifícios e Monumentos Nacionais (General Directorate for Buildings and National Monuments) started various restoration works on the church. This included the demolition of the northern chapel (where the sacristy functioned) and the construction of a larger annex; the demolition of the old sacristy; opening of the lateral northern doorway (which was blocked); dismantling of the choir, frontispiece, nave altars and substitution of the altar; the consolidation and repositioning of the architrave of the main chapel; removal of the pulpit, existing tiles and reconstruction of the same; cleaning and repairs to the stonework (interior and exterior); consolidation and restoration of Rosetta window; reconstruction of the granite slab pavement and leveling; regularization of the churchyard; construction and replacement of the doorways and the placement of the windows. In the course of these repairs, in 1936, a study was made of the frescoes within the church, and two years later, the cemetery was moved.

Restoration work was also carried-out in 1946 along with repairs to the roof, two years later.

Between 1951 and 1952, the tabernacle from the cathedral of Miranda do Douro were moved and adapted to the church. Yet, the following year, urgent work was needed in the ceiling of the nave.

The spaces were modernized in 1960, with the installation of electrical lighting in the structure, that were expanded in 1961. Along with repairs to the ceiling and painting of the doors in 1968, corbels were installed in 1967, to install images. Work on the roof and ceiling were ongoing in the next few years, that included a major cleaning and repair between 1970 and 1971, especially in 1972, following damage caused by a storm.

Work in 1973 included the integration with the old cemetery and churchyard. While the remainder of the 1970s, work was instituted to conserve the stonework, colonnades and cornerstones, in order to offset erosion. Meanwhile, in the interior, work was undertaken to restore and preserve the various frescoes. This work ultimately lead to the 1995 project by the IPPAR to restore two frescoes that flanked the triumphal archway, in addition to consolidation and cleaning.

The municipal council of Ponte da Barca continues to study the possibility of creating a museological centre alongside the church, along with many of the frescoes that were removed to the Museu Nacional de Arte Antiga (National Museum of Ancient Art).

== Architecture ==
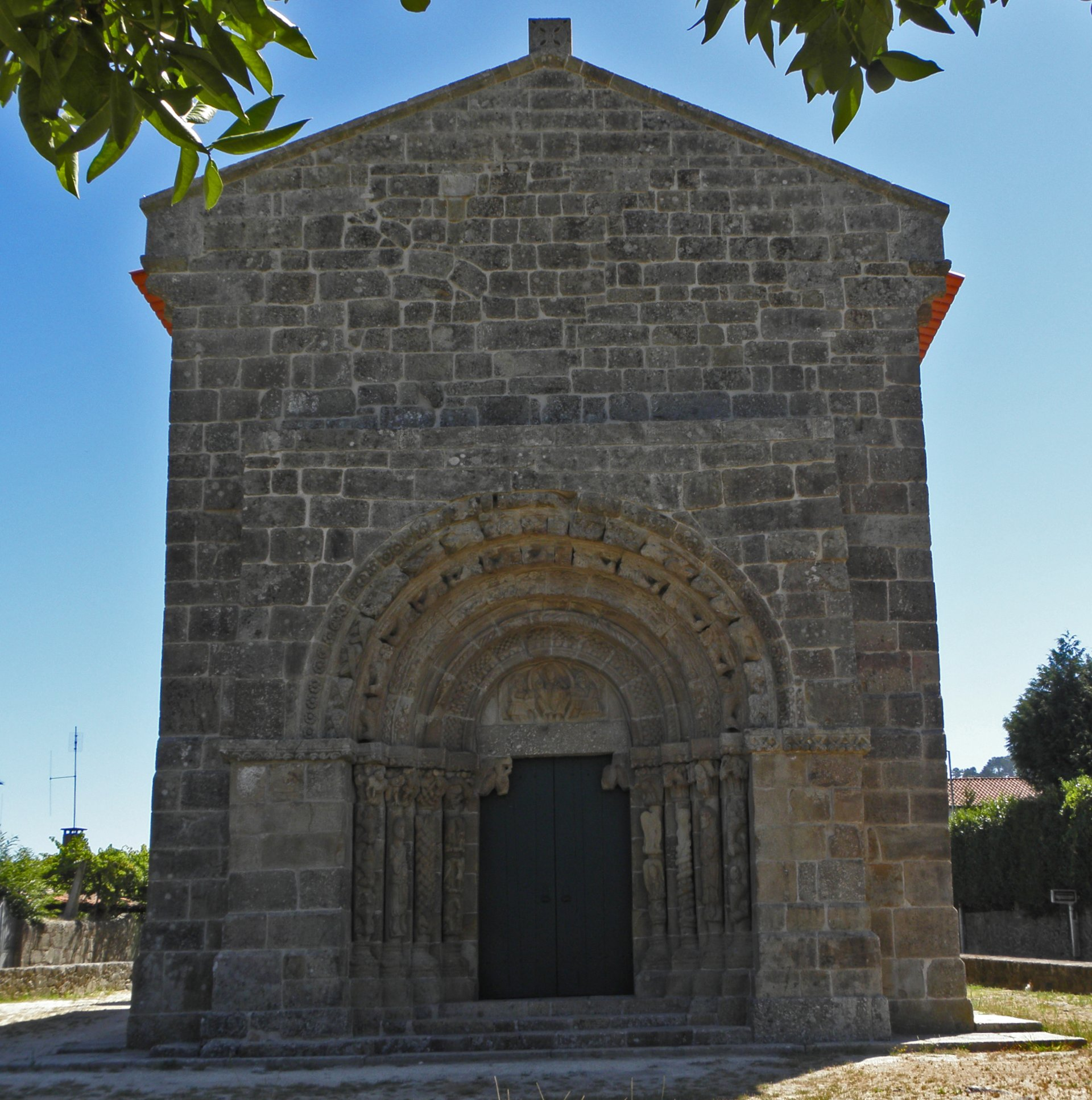
The front facade of the two-register church and decorated architrave

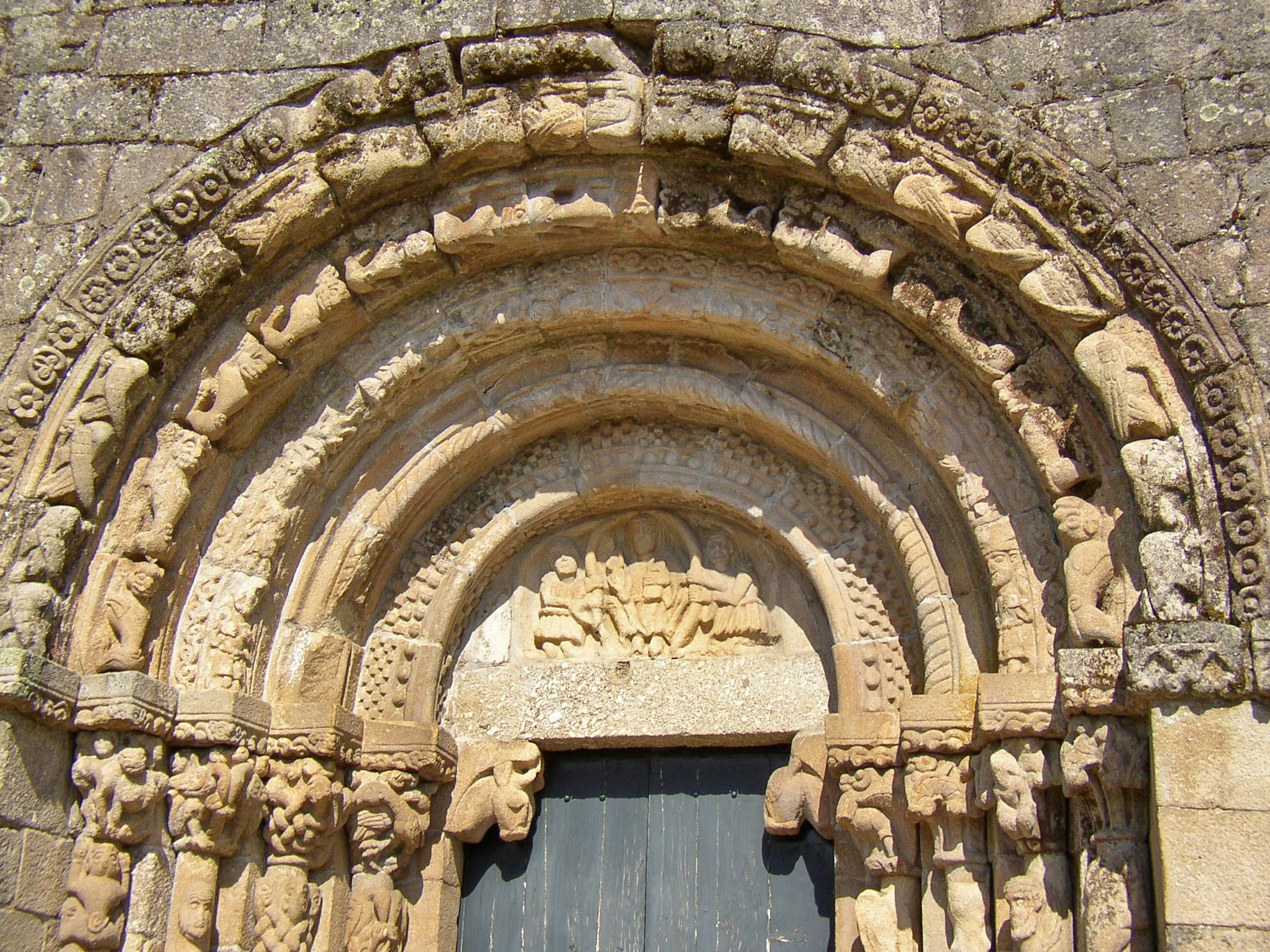
The elaborate architrave of the main portico

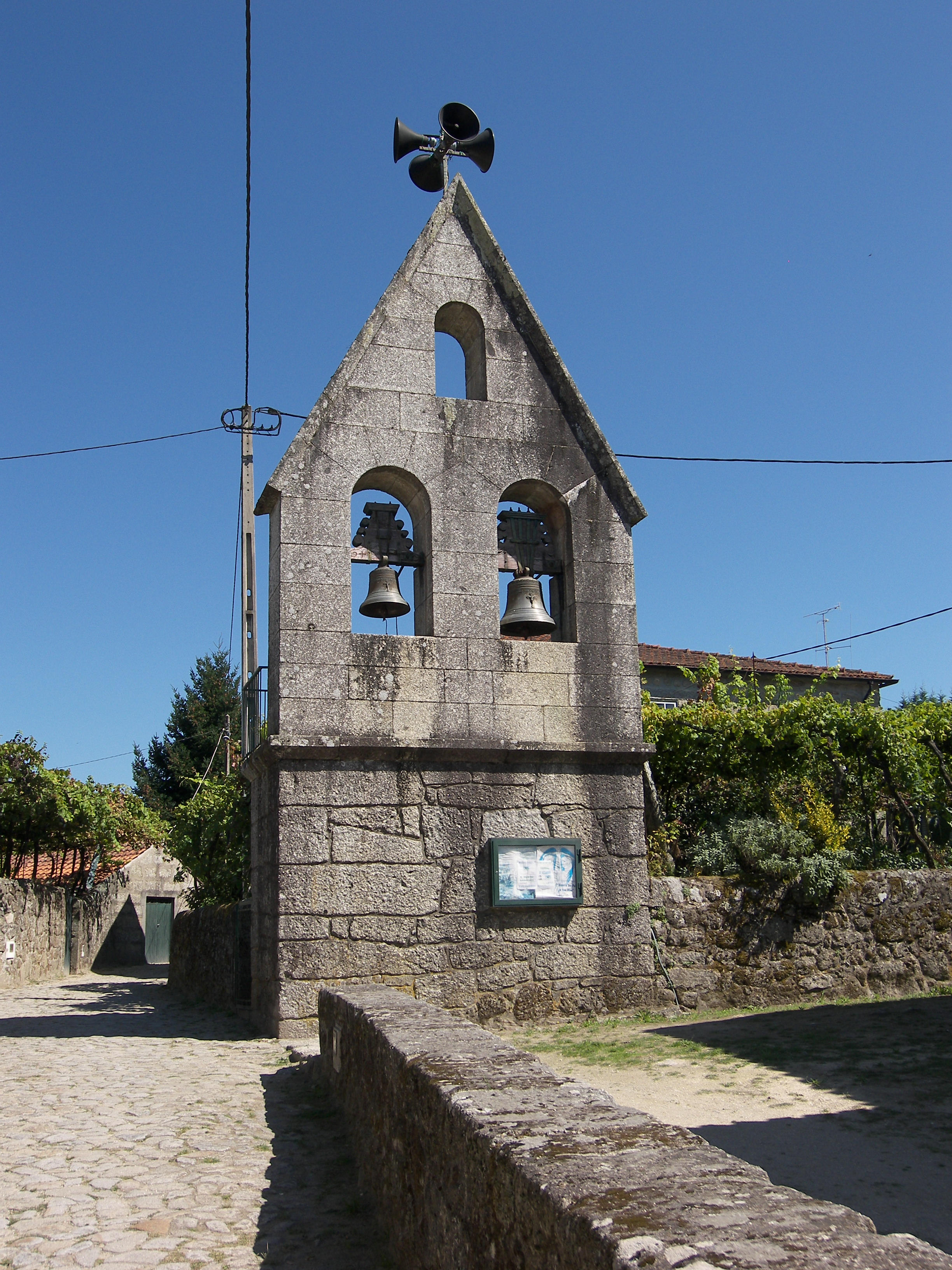
The detached belltower located in along the south facade of the church

The rural church is located in the Lima valley along the main roadway between Ponte da Barca and Ponte de Lima. The church courtyard is encircled by a stone wall and the southern extent includes a belltower with other structures situated around the building.

The longitudinal plan of the church is composed of a single-nave and rectangular presbytery (which is lower and narrower), with northern sacristy and tiled roof. Its principal facade terminates in the gabled roof and includes a central portico on the ground floor, consisting of four columns supporting an architrave with decorative zoomorphic motifs. The columns of this portico are decorated with monkeys, human figures (interpreted as the Virgin Mary and Angel Gabriel), entwined serpents and eagles with their beaks within a cornucopia. The capitals are decorated in vegetal forms or zoomorphic patterns. The first archivolt has a rosetta and rings, the second monkeys, the third monoliths and human figures. The tympanum includes a central figure of Christ secured by two angels. These images imply a level of universal surrender of the human forms by figures within the archivolt, while others suggest that the figures represent the figures of the Apostles of Christ, who were depicted as being represented by the types of images. Also problematic in this interpretation are the two figures of Mary and angel Gabriel (normally associated with the Annunciation) and who Lourenço Alves interprets as monks.

The lateral facades with simple cornice circles the building. On the south facade is a Romanesque doorway with zoomorphic forms and tympanum with Agnus Dei and cross under a double archivolt that consists of decorated pearl fillets. Meanwhile, the north facade is decorated with a cross and two animals. Both doorways used a standard door, but the stonework suggests a double rectangular form.

The interior nave is circled by frieze, with four slits flanked by columns and capitals, decorated with vegetal and geometric shapes over archways. The frontispiece likely included slits, with vestiges clearly visible in the interior. Over the axial portico is a double archivolt and tympanum with the cord of Solomon, surmounted by a covered slit or niche, and the ceiling is covered in wood. The triumphal archway to the presbytery is decorated by lions and leaves, columnar capitals and sculpted race, flanked by two frescoes representing Martírio de São Sebastião (Martyr of St. Sebastian) and Virgem de pé, com o Menino nos braços (Virgin Mary and Child). Above these features in the gabled-end is a sculpted Rosetta window.

The original mural paintings include the following: Martírio de São Sebastião 171 centimetres (67 in) high by 140 cm (55 in) wide; Lava-pés 215.5 × 172.5 cm (h×w, 84.8 × 67.9 in); Deposição no túmulo 216 cm (85 in) high by 119 cm (47 in) wide; Descida da cruz 216 cm (85 in) high by 180 cm (71 in) wide; Sagrada Família 150.5 × 130.7 cm (h×w, 59.3 × 51.5 in), date between 1540 and 1550; and the image of São Salvador 172 × 67.5 cm (67.7 × 26.6 in), date to 1500: these were transferred to the Alberto Sampaio Museum in Guimarães.
