= Scaevinia gens =

Ancient Roman family

The gens Scaevinia, sometimes written Scaevina, was an obscure plebeian family at ancient Rome. Members of this gens are not mentioned in ancient writers, but several are known from inscriptions.

== Origin ==
The nomen Scaevinius belongs to a class of gentilicia formed using the suffix -inius, typically derived from cognomina ending in -inus. The root of the name is probably Scaevinus, although -inius came to be regarded as a regular gentile-forming suffix, and might have been applied directly to Scaevius, an existing gentile name. The nomen Scaevilius seems to have arisen in the same manner. All of these are ultimately derived from the cognomen Scaeva, originally referring to someone left-handed, or by extension someone strongly affected by fate, whether for good or ill.

== Branches and cognomina ==
Of the cognomina borne by the Scaevinii, Capito originally described someone with a large or prominent head, while Quadratus, literally "square" might describe someone stocky, or particularly angular. Proculus, of which Procilla is a diminutive, was an old Roman praenomen that later became a surname. It was usually explained as a name given to a child born while his father was abroad, but might perhaps have been a diminutive of Proca, a name known from Roman myth, possibly referring to a suitor, or from procer, a prince or leader.

== Members ==
This list includes abbreviated praenomina. For an explanation of this practice, see filiation.

- Scaevinia, named in a second century inscription dedicated to Hercules at Nomentum in Latium.
- Scaevinius, the master of Saturio, a slave named in an inscription from Interamna Lirenas in Latium, dating to AD 38.
- Scaevinius L. f. Capito, a veteran buried at Garda in Venetia and Histria, with a monument dedicated by the sodales Marcus Turallasius and Satyrius Culicionis.
- Scaevinia Procilla, buried at Ravenna in Cisalpine Gaul, aged eighteen, with a monument from her parents, Scaevinius Proculus and Caecilia Quinta.
- Scaevinius Proculus, together with his wife, Caecilia Quinta, dedicated a monument at Ravenna to their daughter, Scaevinia Procilla.
- Lucius Scaevinus L. l. Quadratus, a freedman buried at Verona in Venetia and Histria, together with his sister, Aucta.

== See also ==
- List of Roman gentes

== Bibliography ==
- Theodor Mommsen et alii, Corpus Inscriptionum Latinarum (The Body of Latin Inscriptions, abbreviated CIL), Berlin-Brandenburgische Akademie der Wissenschaften (1853–present).
- René Cagnat et alii, L'Année épigraphique (The Year in Epigraphy, abbreviated AE), Presses Universitaires de France (1888–present).
- George Davis Chase, "The Origin of Roman Praenomina", in Harvard Studies in Classical Philology, vol. VIII, pp. 103–184 (1897).
- John C. Traupman, The New College Latin & English Dictionary, Bantam Books, New York (1995).
