= Castle of Lindoso =

Medieval castle in Viana do Castelo, Portugal

Coordinates: 41.8669°N 8.1992°W

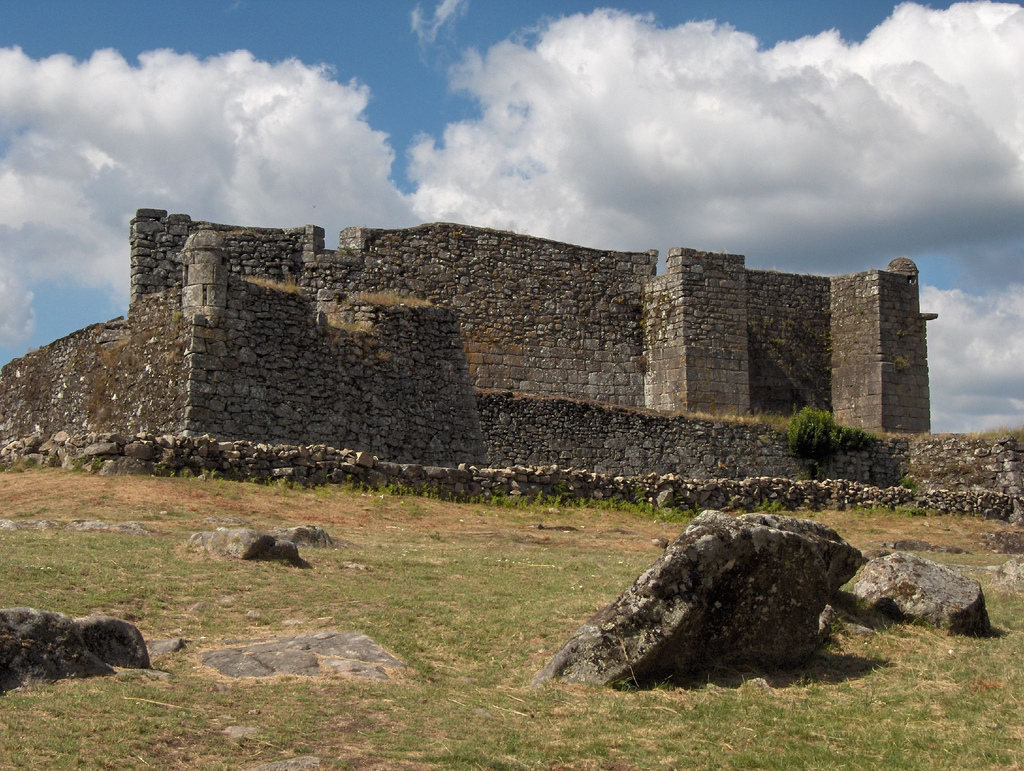
Castle of Lindoso

The Castle of Lindoso (Portuguese: Castelo de Lindoso) is a medieval castle in the civil parish of Lindoso, municipality of Ponte da Barca, in the Portuguese district of Viana do Castelo.

It is classified as a National Monument.

== History ==
=== Medieval Era ===
Little is known of the early era. It is believed the fortress was started under the 13th century reign of Afonso III of Portugal, entered in strengthening efforts of the defensive system of borders, undertaken by that ruler.

The castle was constructed and was of low importance.

=== Post Middle Ages ===
During the time of the Restoration of Portuguese independence, the castle and its location gained importance in view of its border location. For this reason, the location was used as a support base in the context of Portuguese incursions in Galicia by the military forces of Portugal in September 1641. As the war progressed, the castle received modernization and restoration works, which were completed around 1666 (date inscribed on the lintel of a door). It was only three years after briefly falling into the hands of Spanish troops. It is believed that the works have been dragged for a few more decades, since 1720 to date of completion of the main ravelin that defends the main entrance.

=== 20th century to modern day ===
The castle saw a defensive state in the Napoleonic Wars but never saw action. It has never been used since.

Peacetime took its toll. Neglect and lack of maintenance saw the castle slowly wear away from the weather and elements. The Castle of Lindoso was declared a National Monument by the Portuguese Government in a decree on June 23, 1910.

== Architecture ==
The structure is constructed using stone masonry walls, the top of which is surrounded by a battlement. The north and south ends of the tower are accessible by doors opened by drawbridge.

The keep still stands, having been divided into two floors.
