= Nito (footballer, born 1967) =

Portuguese footballer

Personal information
- Full name: Adelino da Rocha Vieira
- Date of birth: 5 July 1967 (age 59)
- Place of birth: Ponte da Barca, Portugal
- Height: 1.74 m (5 ft 9 in)
- Position: Defender

Senior career*
Years	Team	Apps	(Gls)
1986–1987	Ponte da Barca		
1987–1990	Sporting Espinho		
1990–1995	Belenenses		
1996	Tirsense	14	(0)
1996–2002	Rio Ave	155	(2)
2002–2004	Valdevez		
- * Club domestic league appearances and goals

Adelino da Rocha Vieira (born 5 July 1967), known as Nito, is a Portuguese former footballer who played as a defender. He played 11 seasons and 285 games in the Primeira Liga for Belenenses, Rio Ave, Sporting Espinho and Tirsense.

== Career ==
Nito made his Primeira Liga debut for Sporting Espinho on 23 August 1987 in a game against Marítimo.
