= Ponte da Barca =

- Municipality
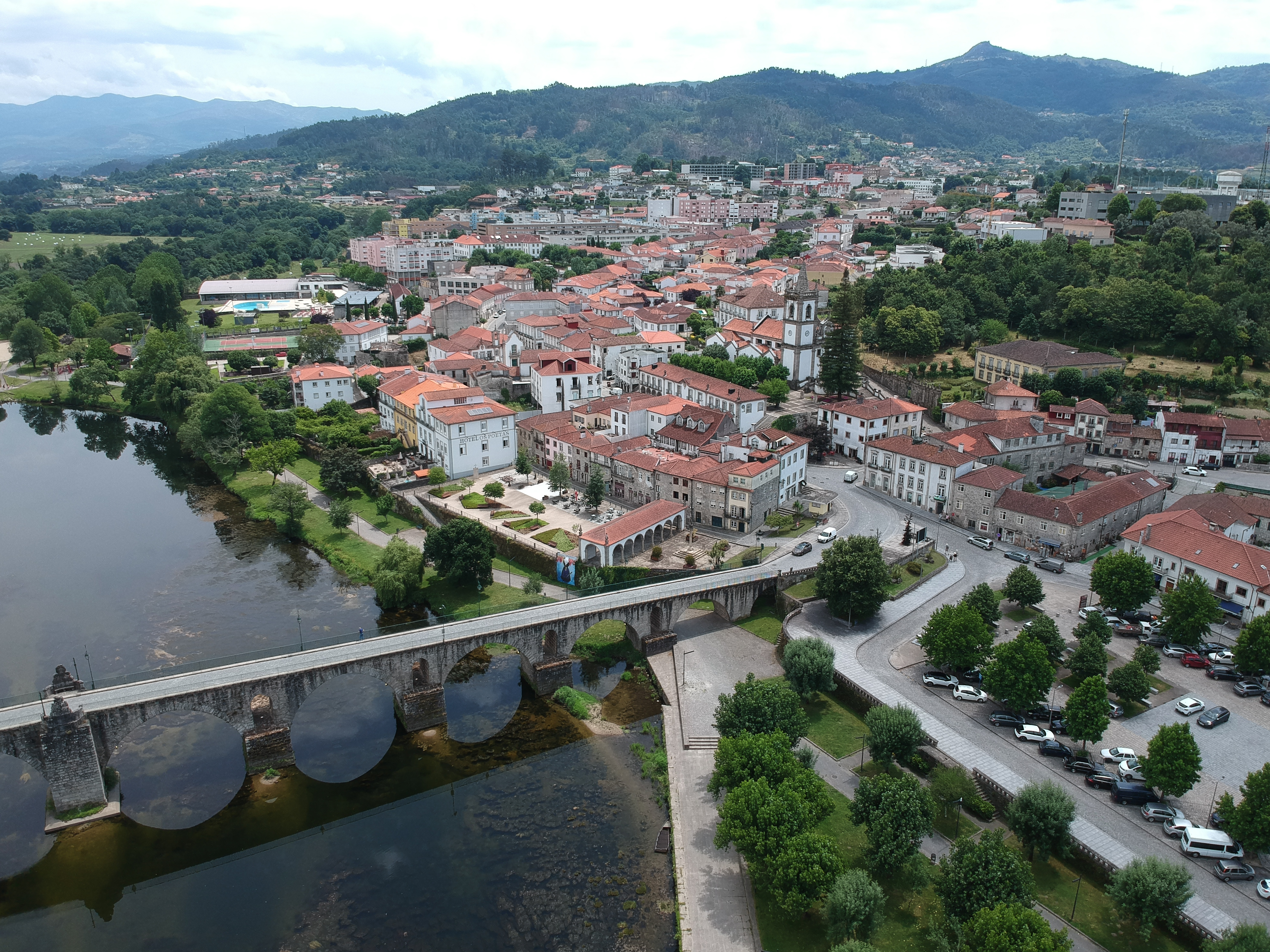
- Aerial view of Ponte da Barca

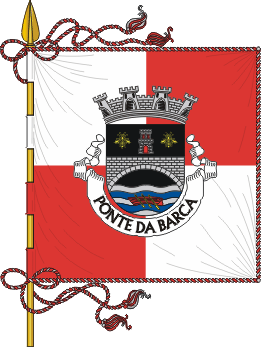
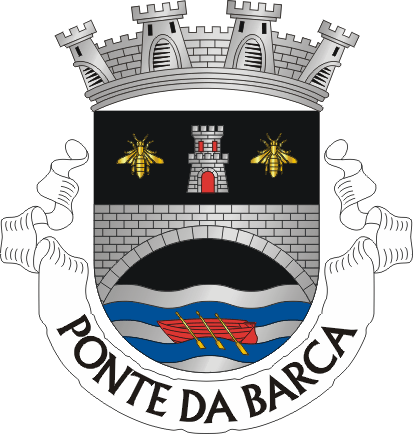
- Flag Coat of arms
- Interactive map of Ponte da Barca
- Coordinates: 41°48′N 8°24′W
- Country: Portugal
- Region: Norte
- Intermunic. comm.: Alto Minho
- District: Viana do Castelo
- Parishes: 17

Government
  - President: Augusto Manuel Dos Reis Marinho (PSD)

Area
  - Total: 182.11 km^{2} (70.31 sq mi)

Population (2021)
  - Total: 11,044
  - Density: 60.645/km^{2} (157.07/sq mi)
- Time zone: UTC+00:00 (WET)
  - Summer (DST): UTC+01:00 (WEST)
- Local holiday: S. Bartolomeu; August 24
- Website: http://www.cmpb.pt/

Ponte da Barca (Portuguese pronunciation: [ˈpõtɨ ðɐ ˈβaɾkɐ]; lit. '"Bridge of the Boat"') is a town and a municipality in the district of Viana do Castelo in northern Portugal. It spans an area of 182.11 square kilometres (70.31 mi^{2}) and had a population of 11,044 as of the 2021 census. The town itself is located in the parish of Ponte da Barca, Vila Nova da Muía e Paço Vedro de Magalhães, which had 4,192 residents in the same year.

The area has been inhabited since prehistoric times and was known in the Middle Ages as Terra da Nóbrega, a name linked to a fortified hilltop settlement in the parish of Sampriz. The town of Ponte da Barca developed between the 12th and 13th centuries around a key river crossing on pilgrimage routes to Santiago de Compostela. It was originally known as Barca, in reference to a boat used for crossing the Lima River, and later renamed after the construction of a bridge in the 14th century.

Part of the municipality is located within the Peneda-Gerês National Park, Portugal’s only national park. This includes the historic village of Lindoso, home to a medieval castle and traditional granaries.

The present Mayor is Augusto Manuel Dos Reis Marinho, elected by the Social Democratic Party (PSD). The municipal holiday is August 24.

== History ==
Archaeological findings in the municipality of Ponte da Barca indicate human presence dating back to prehistoric times. The area was inhabited during the Roman period, as evidenced by archaeological finds such as ceramics, coins, and sculptures discovered primarily in the Serra Amarela area. A particularly notable find is the Pedra dos Namorados (Lovers' Stone), found in the parish of Ermida, a low-relief sculpture of a man and woman.

During the medieval era, the region was known as "Terra da Nóbrega." The name of this medieval administrative division, likely of Celtic origin, signifies a fortified place and refers to a defensive hillfort in the parish of Sampriz. Ourigo Ourigues, the presumed first governor, later rebuilt the Nóbrega Castle on the site of this hillfort.

The town itself was founded between the 12th and 13th centuries as the population migrated towards the riverbanks. It was positioned at a crossroads of two pilgrimage routes to Santiago de Compostela. The town's name is derived from the way people crossed the Lima River. Initially, a boat ("barca") was used for crossing, and the locality was known as "Barca." The name changed to "Ponte da Barca" (Bridge of the Boat) after the construction of its first bridge, likely in the mid-14th century, which significantly increased its commercial importance.

The municipality experienced its most severe flood on record in 1909, when the water in the Lima River reached up to 2 metres (6.6 ft) high inside buildings. The flooding caused damage to homes, businesses, and communication routes, especially in the riverside areas near Curro and Jardim dos Poetas. Subsequent floods have occurred but of lesser magnitude, with water levels reaching up to 1.5 metres (4.9 ft) inside buildings.

In July 2025, a major wildfire consumed over 7,500 hectares (19,000 acres) within the Peneda-Gerês National Park, across the municipalities of Ponte da Barca and Terras de Bouro. The fire caused extensive environmental damage to the Serra Amarela and surrounding areas, leading to the destruction of habitats and the loss of animals and beehives. The economic impact was also significant, affecting tourism and damaging infrastructure.

== Climate ==
Ponte da Barca has a Mediterranean climate with oceanic/humid subtropical influences. It has warm to hot summers and mild, very wet winters.

Climate data for Ponte da Barca, 1981-2021, altitude: 39 m (128 ft)
Month	Jan	Feb	Mar	Apr	May	Jun	Jul	Aug	Sep	Oct	Nov	Dec	Year
Daily mean °C (°F)	8.2 (46.8)	9.3 (48.7)	11.7 (53.1)	13.6 (56.5)	16.2 (61.2)	19.3 (66.7)	21.5 (70.7)	21.7 (71.1)	19.4 (66.9)	15.6 (60.1)	11.9 (53.4)	9.4 (48.9)	14.8 (58.7)
Average precipitation mm (inches)	173.8 (6.84)	140.1 (5.52)	113.6 (4.47)	145.0 (5.71)	108.3 (4.26)	50.0 (1.97)	21.9 (0.86)	33.3 (1.31)	80.4 (3.17)	191.5 (7.54)	198.1 (7.80)	227.1 (8.94)	1,483.1 (58.39)
Source: Portuguese Environment Agency

Since at least 1909 and as recently as 2024, floods have occurred in the Lima River, causing significant damage in the municipality. The most problematic and frequent damage occurred in the town's center, particularly in the Curro and Jardim dos Poetas areas, both situated along the riverbanks. In the Curro, homes, commercial businesses, historical buildings, and a parking lot were all damaged by the floods. In the Jardim dos Poetas, the damage was mainly to the green areas and public structures, but it also impacted buildings like the Bar do Rio.

== Parishes ==
Administratively, the municipality is divided into 17 civil parishes (freguesias):

- Azias
- Boivães
- Bravães
- Britelo
- Crasto, Ruivos e Grovelas
- Cuide de Vila Verde
- Entre Ambos-os-Rios, Ermida e Germil
- Lavradas
- Lindoso
- Nogueira
- Oleiros
- Ponte da Barca, Vila Nova da Muía e Paço Vedro de Magalhães
- Sampriz
- Vade São Pedro
- Vade São Tomé
- Touvedo (São Lourenço e Salvador)
- Vila Chã (São João Baptista e Santiago)

== Landmarks ==
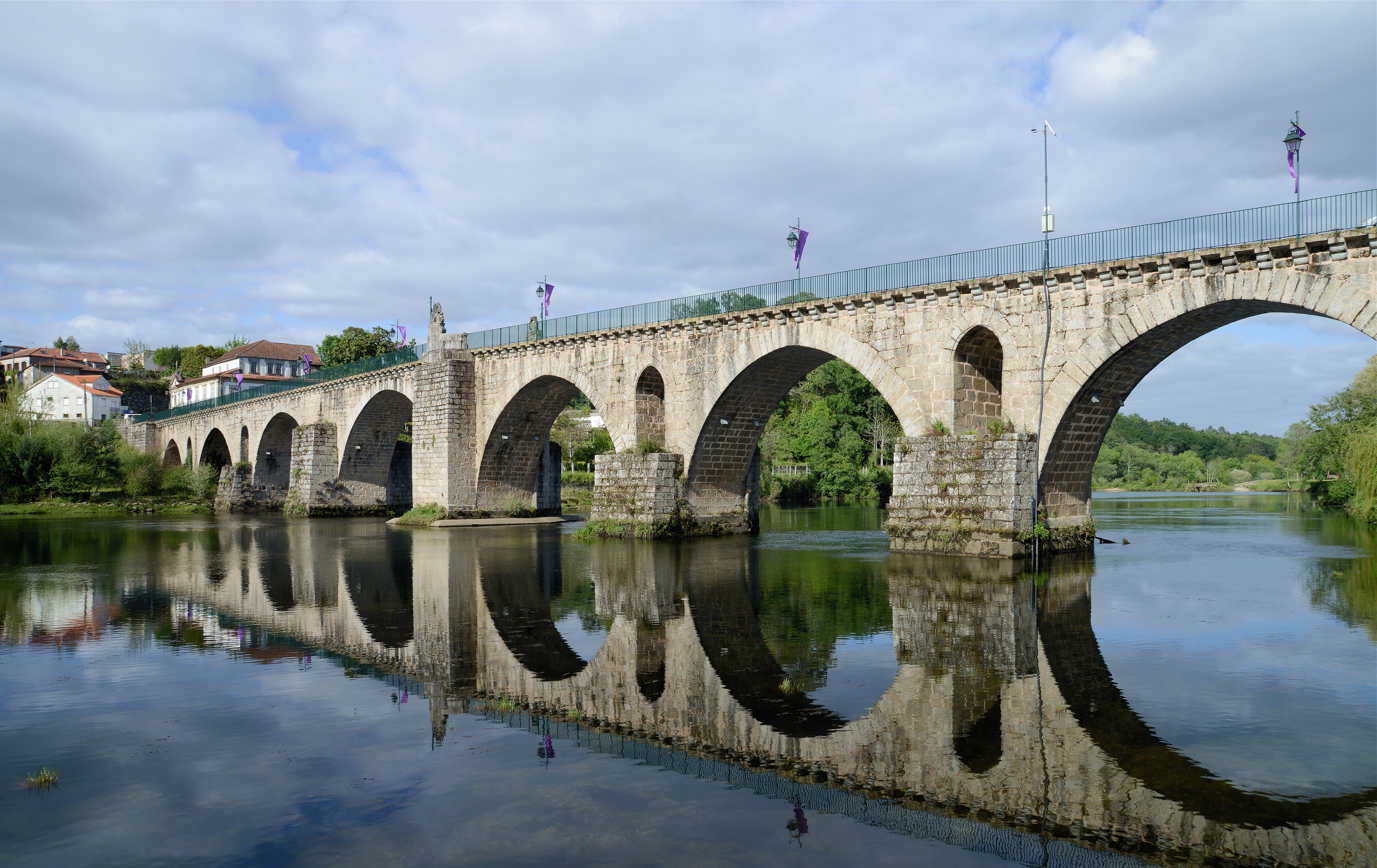
The bridge over the Lima River in Ponte da Barca.

The municipality of Ponte da Barca includes part of the Peneda-Gerês National Park, Portugal's only national park, which encompasses the Serra Amarela mountain range. Within this protected landscape in Ponte da Barca lie several notable sites, including the megalithic necropolis of Serra Amarela and the historic village of Lindoso. The Porta de Lindoso (Lindoso Gate), one of the park's official visitor centers, is located here and focuses on the region’s water resources and geological features.

Within the village of Lindoso lie the Castle of Lindoso and surrounding granaries (espigueiros), which have been classified as a National Monument since 1910. The fortress was originally built around 1250 during the reign of King Afonso III, and later expanded under King Dinis, as part of a broader strategy to defend Portugal’s frontier. The castle overlooks the Lima River and it retains its medieval layout, with a small quadrangular plan, rounded corners, and two square towers.

Other landmarks include the Church of São Salvador in the parish of Bravães and the bridge over the Vade River classified as a Property of Public Interest.

== Infrastructure ==
There are two hydroelectric dams within the territory of Ponte da Barca, Alto Lindoso Dam and Touvedo Dam. They are both located on the Lima River, which serves as the municipality's northern border.

== Notable people ==
- Adérito Esteves (born 1985) a Portuguese rugby union player.
- Manuel Bento de Sousa (1835 – 1899) a physician, anatomist, and polemicist writer.
- João Uva (born 1980) a former rugby union footballer.
- Adelino Vieira (born 1967) known as Nito, a former footballer.
