= Manuel Bento de Sousa =

Manuel Bento de Sousa OSE
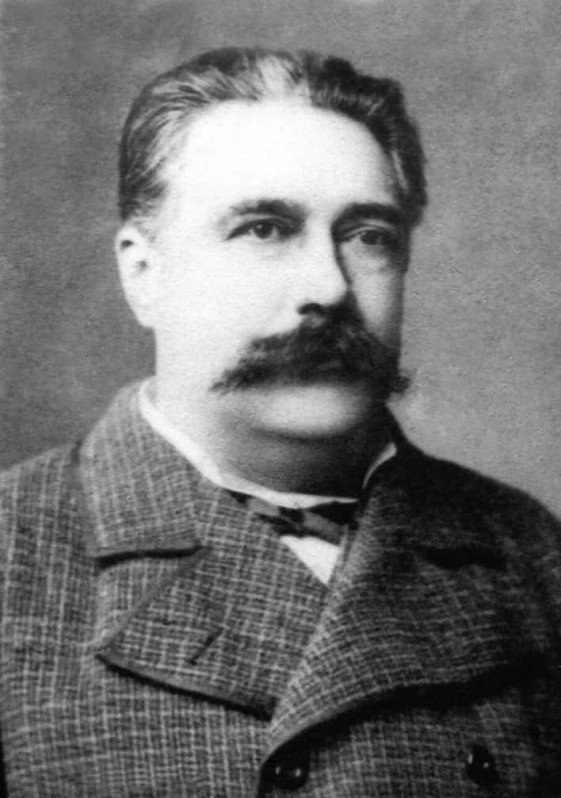
- Born: 5 December 1835; Ponte da Barca, Viana do Castelo, Portugal
- Died: 29 April 1899 (aged 63); Lisbon, Portugal
- Occupations: Physician and professor

Manuel Bento de Sousa OSE (5 December 1835 – 29 April 1899) was a Portuguese physician, anatomist, and noted polemicist writer.

A most prestigious clinician and surgeon in his day, his most important scientific works were conducted in the field of anatomophysiology: notably, in 1870, a purely intellectual inquiry led him to correctly postulate (though without scientific confirmation) the taste sensory component of the intermediate nerve of Wrisberg. This hypothesis was later confirmed by the findings of Carlos Tavares in 1883, leading to the description of the gustatory nerve of Sousa.

In 1875–1876, Bento de Sousa served as President of the Lisbon Society of Medical Sciences.

As a writer, he penned A Parvónia in 1868 (under the pseudonym "Marcos Pinto"), a satirical account of the vices of Lisbon society, and O Doutor Minerva in 1894, mocking the current teaching of the History of Portugal.

== Distinctions ==
=== National orders ===
- Officer of the Order of Saint James of the Sword
