= Alto Lindoso Dam =

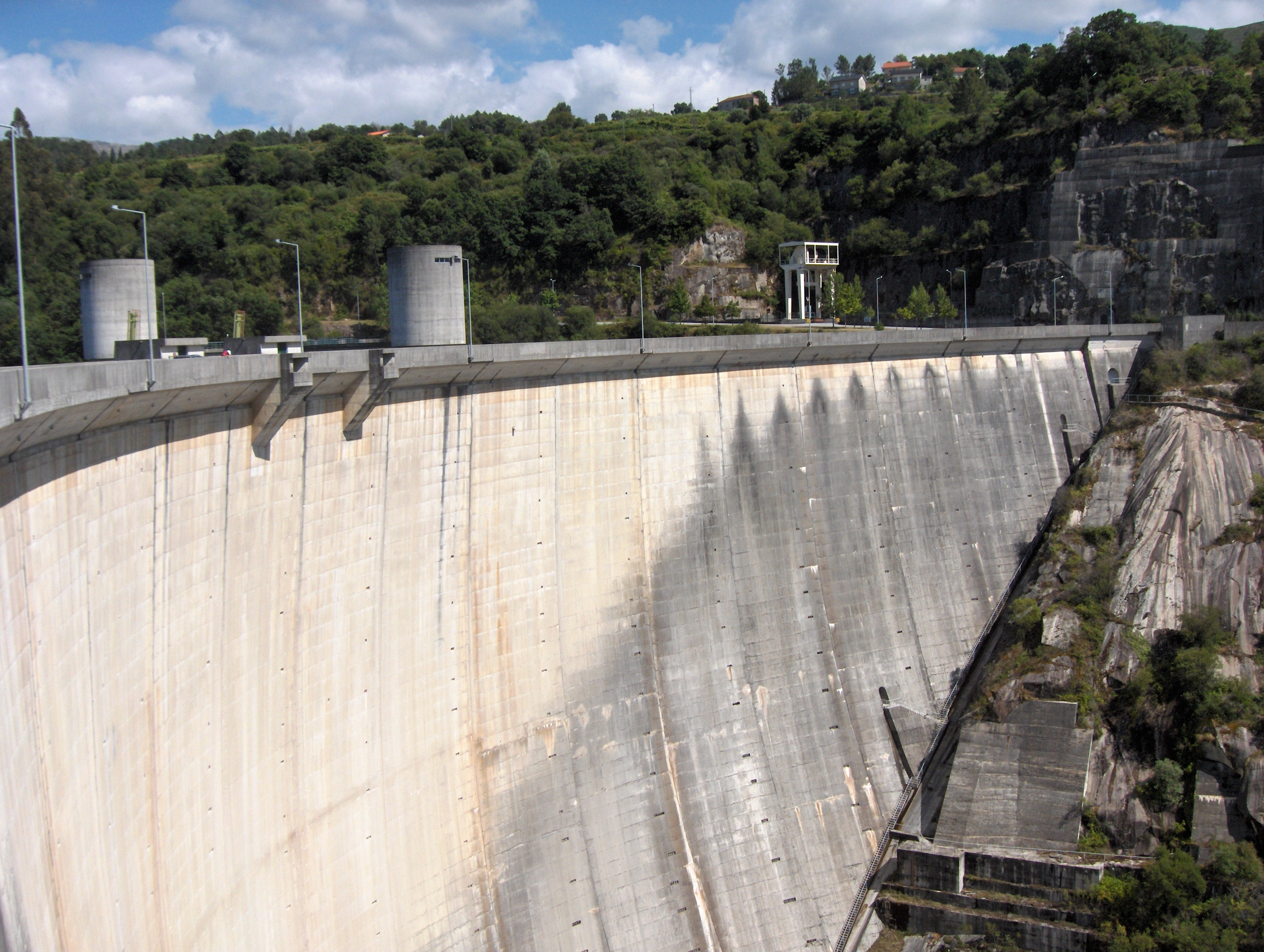

- Location within Portugal
- Official name: Barragem do Alto Lindoso
- Location: municipality Ponte da Barca, Viana do Castelo District, Portugal
- Coordinates: 41°52′19.2″N 8°12′9″W
- Purpose: Power
- Status: Operational
- Construction began: 1983
- Opening date: 1992
- Owner: Companhia Portuguesa de Produção de Electricidade

Dam and spillways
- Type of dam: Concrete double curvature arch dam
- Impounds: Lima
- Height (foundation): 110 m (360 ft)
- Length: 297 m (974 ft)
- Elevation at crest: 339 m (1,112 ft)
- Width (crest): 4 m (13 ft)
- Width (base): 21 m (69 ft)
- Dam volume: 308,500 m^{3} (10,890,000 cu ft)
- Spillway type: 2 shaft spillways
- Spillway capacity: 2,760 m^{3} (97,000 cu ft)

Reservoir
- Total capacity: 379,010,000 m^{3} (307,270 acre⋅ft)
- Active capacity: 347,910,000 m^{3} (282,060 acre⋅ft)
- Surface area: 10.72 km^{2} (4.14 mi^{2})
- Normal elevation: 338 m (1,109 ft)

Power Station
- Operator: Energias de Portugal
- Commission date: 1992
- Type: Pumped-storage
- Hydraulic head: 288 m (945 ft) (max)
- Turbines: 2 x 317 MW Francis-type
- Installed capacity: 630 MW
- Annual generation: 933.8 GWh

Alto Lindoso Dam (Portuguese: Barragem do Alto Lindoso) is a concrete double curvature arch dam on the Lima River in Ponte da Barca, Viana do Castelo District, Portugal. The dam lies in Peneda-Gerês National Park close to the border with Spain. The reservoir created by the dam is known as Alto Lindoso reservoir or Lindoso reservoir.

== History ==
Construction of the dam began in 1983. On 15 August 1991 the land behind the dam lying in Spain was compulsorily acquired by Portuguese company EDP (Electricidade de Portugal), based on an old deal between dictators General Franco of Spain and António de Oliveira Salazar of Portugal. Residents of the five villages which were going to be drowned by the dam, Aceredo, Buscalque, O Bao, A Reloeira and Lantemil, supported by left-leaning political parties, immediately began protests against the building of the dam, including a ten-day hunger strike. In the end, with no option but to move, the residents of Aceredo (a town with 70 houses and 120 citizens) relocated bodies from their cemetery, and a historic church was moved to a different town. Some moved to nearby villages, others far away.

The dam was completed in 1992 and drowned the five villages. It is owned by Companhia Portuguesa de Produção de Electricidade (CPPE). The dam is used for power production.

== Dam ==
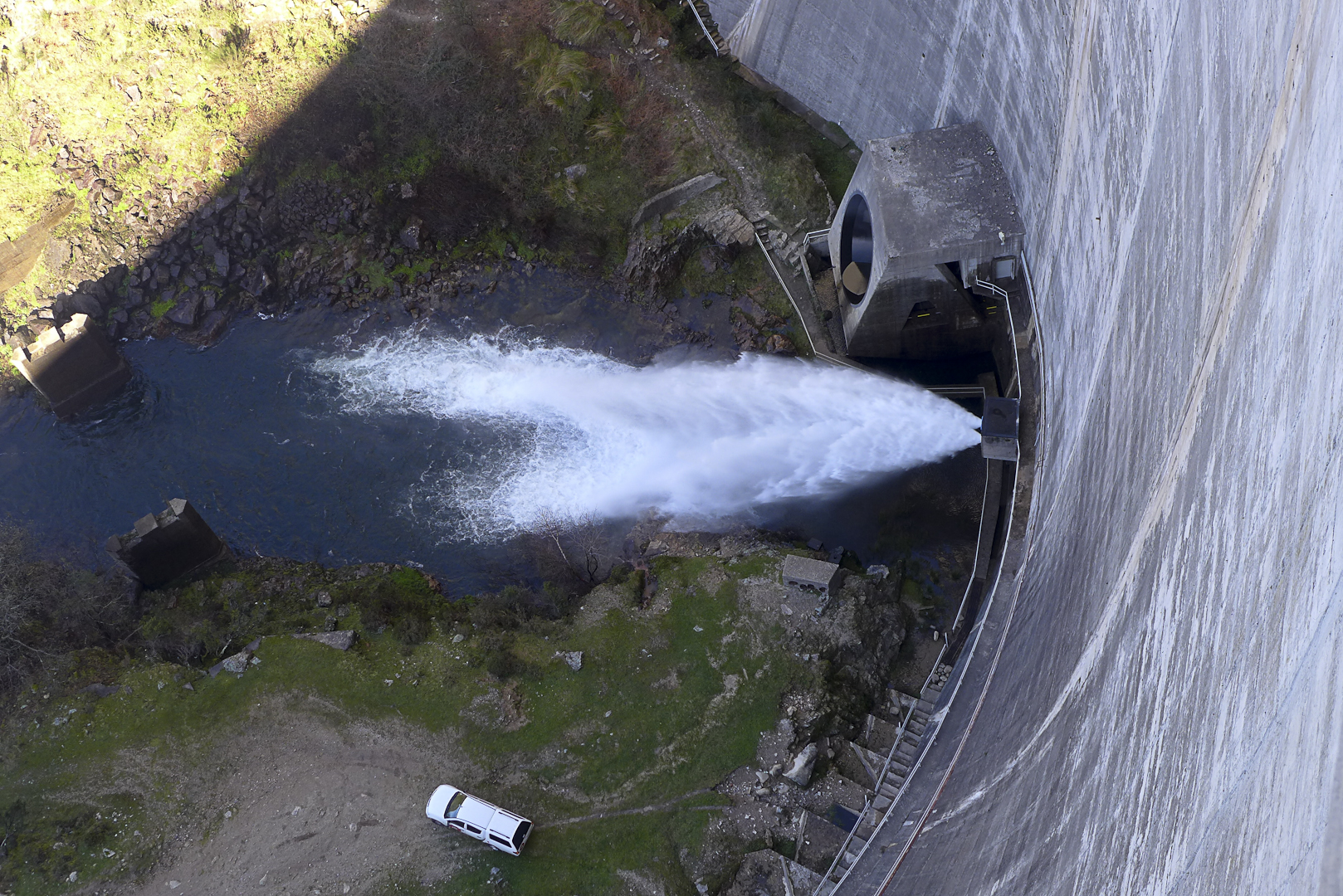

Alto Lindoso Dam is 110 m (360 ft) tall (height above foundation) and 297 m (974 ft) long double curvature arch dam with a crest altitude of 339 m (1,112 ft). The width at the base is 21 m (69 ft) (crest 4 m (13 ft)). The volume of the dam is 308,500 m^{3} (10,890,000 cu ft). The dam contains two shaft spillways with three gates each (combined maximum discharge 2,760 m^{3} (97,000 cu ft)/s) and two bottom outlets (combined maximum discharge 400 m^{3} (14,000 cu ft)/s.

== Reservoir ==
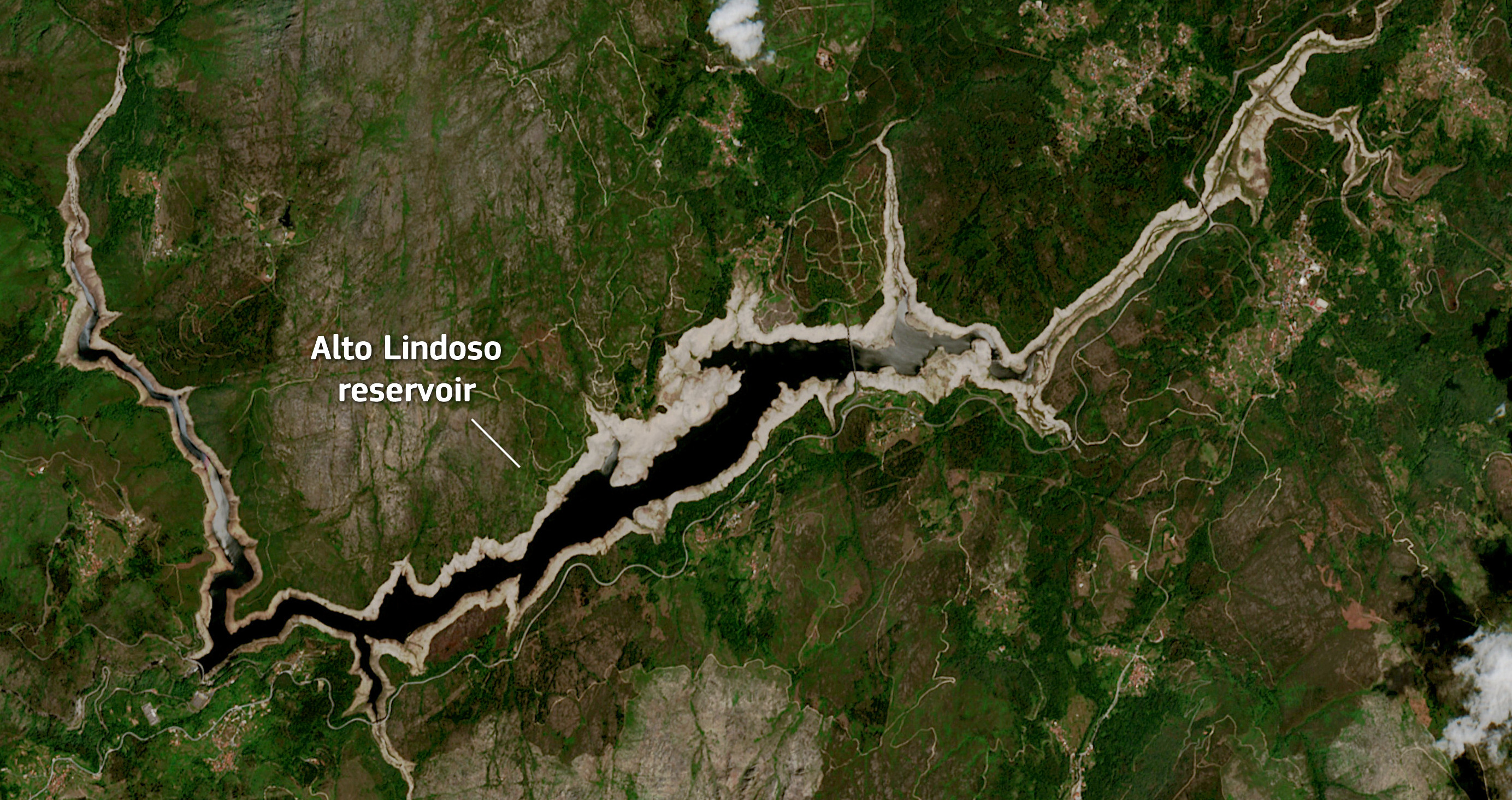
A Sentinel-2 image of the reservoir.

At full reservoir level of 338 m (1,109 ft) (maximum flood level of 339 m (1,112 ft)) the reservoir of the dam has a surface area of 10.72 km^{2} (4.14 sq mi) and its total capacity is 379.01 million m^{3} (13.385 billion cu ft). Its active capacity is 270 hm^{3} (9.5×10^{9} cu ft). Minimum operating level is 280 m (920 ft). With the 347.9 million m^{3} (12.29 billion cu ft) of water, 224.6 GWh of electricity can be produced.

The formerly drowned village of Aceredo in 2022 emerged again after prolonged drought.

== Power plant ==
The pumped-storage hydroelectric power plant went operational in 1992. It is owned by CPPE, but operated by EDP. The plant has a nameplate capacity of 630 (634) MW. Its average annual generation is somewhat more than 900 GWh.

The power station contains 2 Francis turbine-generators of 317 MW (350 MVA) each in an underground powerhouse 340 m (1,120 ft) below the surface. The turbine rotates at 214.3 rpm. The minimum hydraulic head is 227 m (745 ft), the maximum 288 m (945 ft). Maximum flow per turbine is 125 m^{3} (4,400 cu ft)/s.

As lower reservoir for Alto Lindoso the reservoir of Touvedo dam is used, which is connected via a tailrace tunnel with a length of 4,883 m (16,020 ft).

== See also ==
- List of power stations in Portugal
- List of dams and reservoirs in Portugal
