= Lobios =

- Municipality
- Coat of arms

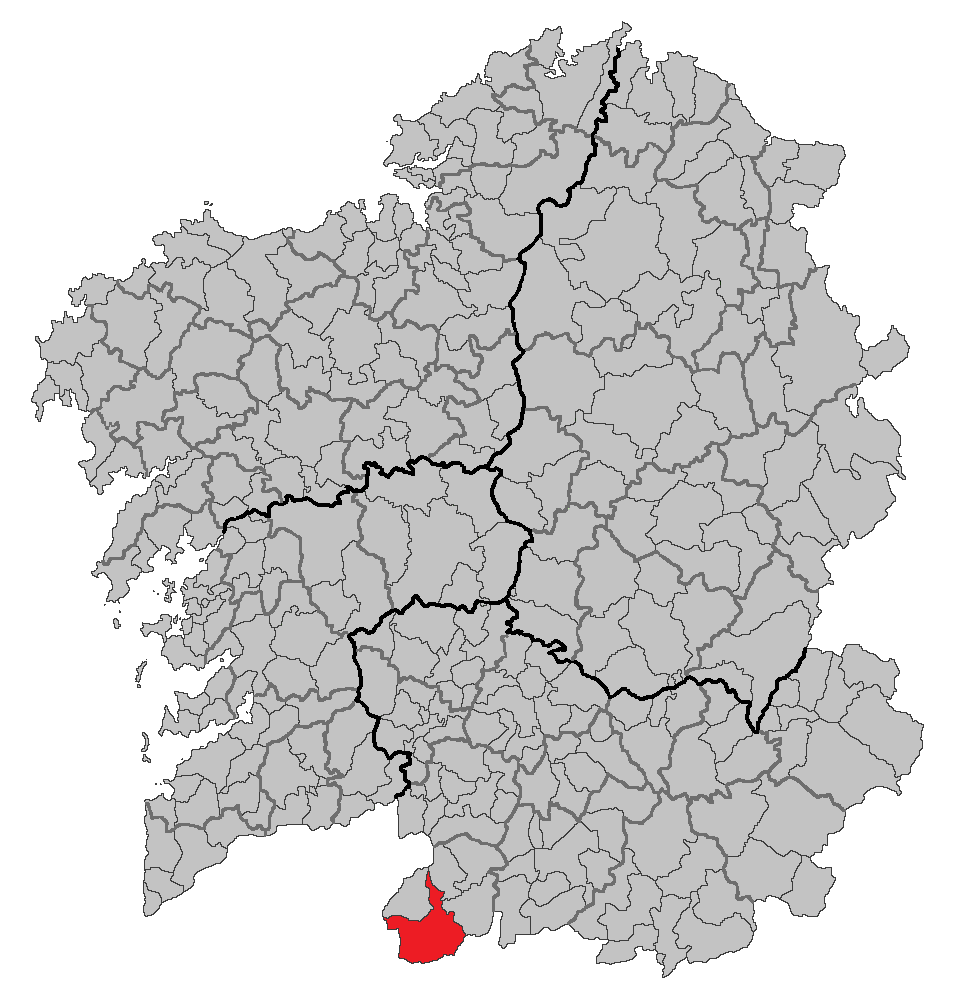
- Location in Galicia

- Location in Spain
- Coordinates: 41°52′31″N 08°05′04″W
- Country: Spain
- Autonomous community: Galicia
- Province: Ourense
- Comarca: A Baixa Limia

Government
  - Mayor: María del Carmen Yáñez Salgado (People's Party of Galicia)

Area
  - Total: 68.9 km^{2} (26.6 sq mi)
- Elevation: 387 m (1,270 ft)

Population (2025-01-01)
  - Total: 1,776
  - Density: 25.8/km^{2} (66.8/sq mi)
- Time zone: UTC+1 (CET)
  - Summer (DST): UTC+2 (CEST)
- Postal Code: 32643
- INE municipality code: 32042

Lobios is a municipality in the province of Ourense, in the autonomous community of Galicia, Spain. It belongs to the comarca of A Baixa Limia. The estimated population in 2021 was 1,672. The town borders Portugal to the south.

== Drowned villages ==
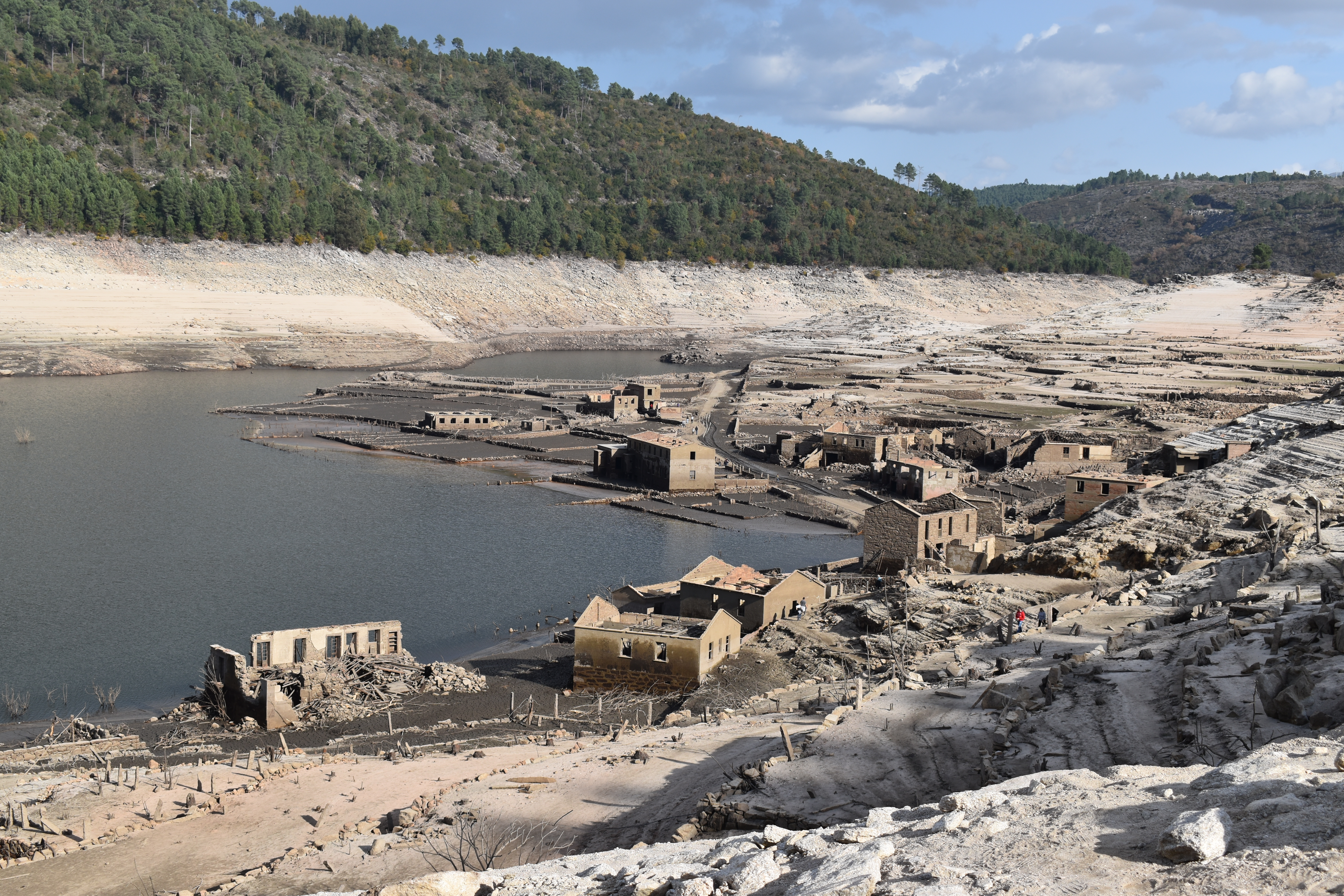
Aceredo exposed in 2021

The village of Aceredo (gl:Aceredo (solagado)) lies within the municipality, but in 1992 it, along with the villages of gl:Buscalque, O Vao, A Reloeira and gl:Lantemil, which together had 250 residents, was drowned by the reservoir behind the Alto Lindoso Dam downstream on the Limia River in Portugal. On 15 August 1991 the land was compulsorily acquired by Portuguese company EDP (Electricidade de Portugal), based on an old deal between Spanish dictator General Franco and Portuguese dictator António de Oliveira Salazar. Residents of all of the villages, supported by left-leaning political parties, immediately began protests against the building of the dam, including a 10-day hunger strike. In the end, with no option but to move, the residents of Aceredo (with 70 houses and 120 citizens) relocated bodies of their deceased loved ones, and an historic church was moved to a different town. Some moved to nearby villages, while others moved far away.

In 2015 a documentary film about the drowning of Aceredo and Buscalque was released, called Os Días Afogados (The Drowned Days).

After prolonged drought in the region in early 2022, the water in the reservoir receded dramatically back to 15% of its capacity, and the "ghost village" once more became visible on dry land. The derelict village became a tourist attraction and made news across the world. As of February 2022, stone buildings are still visible, as well as debris that once made up roofs, doors and beams, and there is a drinking fountain which streams with water, crates of old beer bottles next to an old cafe, and a rusty old car.

The mayor of Lobios, Maria del Carmen Yanez, said in February 2022 that Portugal's power utility EDP, which manages the reservoir, had not managed the use of the water well. On 1 February 2022, after a particularly dry January, the Portuguese Government ordered that Alto Lindoso, along with five other dams, to almost cease using water to generate electricity and for irrigating crops. Experts have said that climate change caused the extreme drought. Spain recorded only 35 per cent of its average rainfall during the same period over the years 1981 to 2010, and there had been no rain at all in 2022 up until mid-February.

== See also ==
- Ludeiros, a village in the municipality of Lobios
