= Lima River =

River arising in Spain and flowing through Portugal

Lima River Limia River, Rio Lima
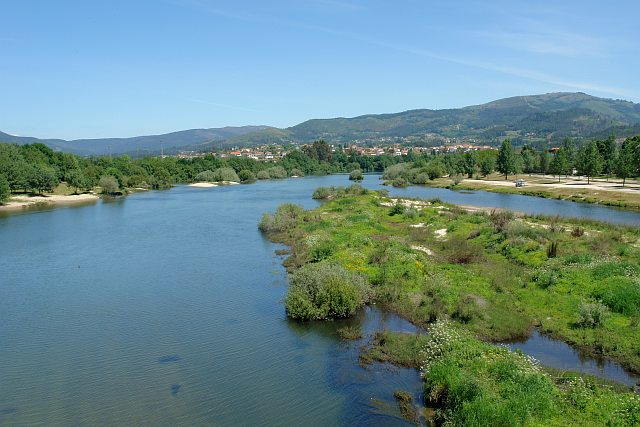
- Lima Bridge on Lima River in Ponte de Lima, Portugal

- Location of river mouth in Portugal

Location
- Country: Portugal, Spain
- County: Norte Region, Portugal

Physical characteristics
- Source
  - location: Norte Region, Portugal
- Mouth
  - location: Viana do Castelo, Norte Region, Portugal
  - coordinates: 41.6824°N 8.8369°W

The Lima River (Portuguese name; known as Limia in Spanish and Galician) runs west from the autonomous community of Galicia in Spain to Portugal, where it enters the Atlantic Ocean at Viana do Castelo, covering 108 kilometres (67 mi).

== Etymology and history ==
The Romans identified the Lima (called Limaeas) with the mythical Lethe and also said that some Celtiberians called it the Belion. Brutus Callaicus became the first Roman to cross the river, carrying his standard with him to convince his frightened soldiers to follow.

== Description ==
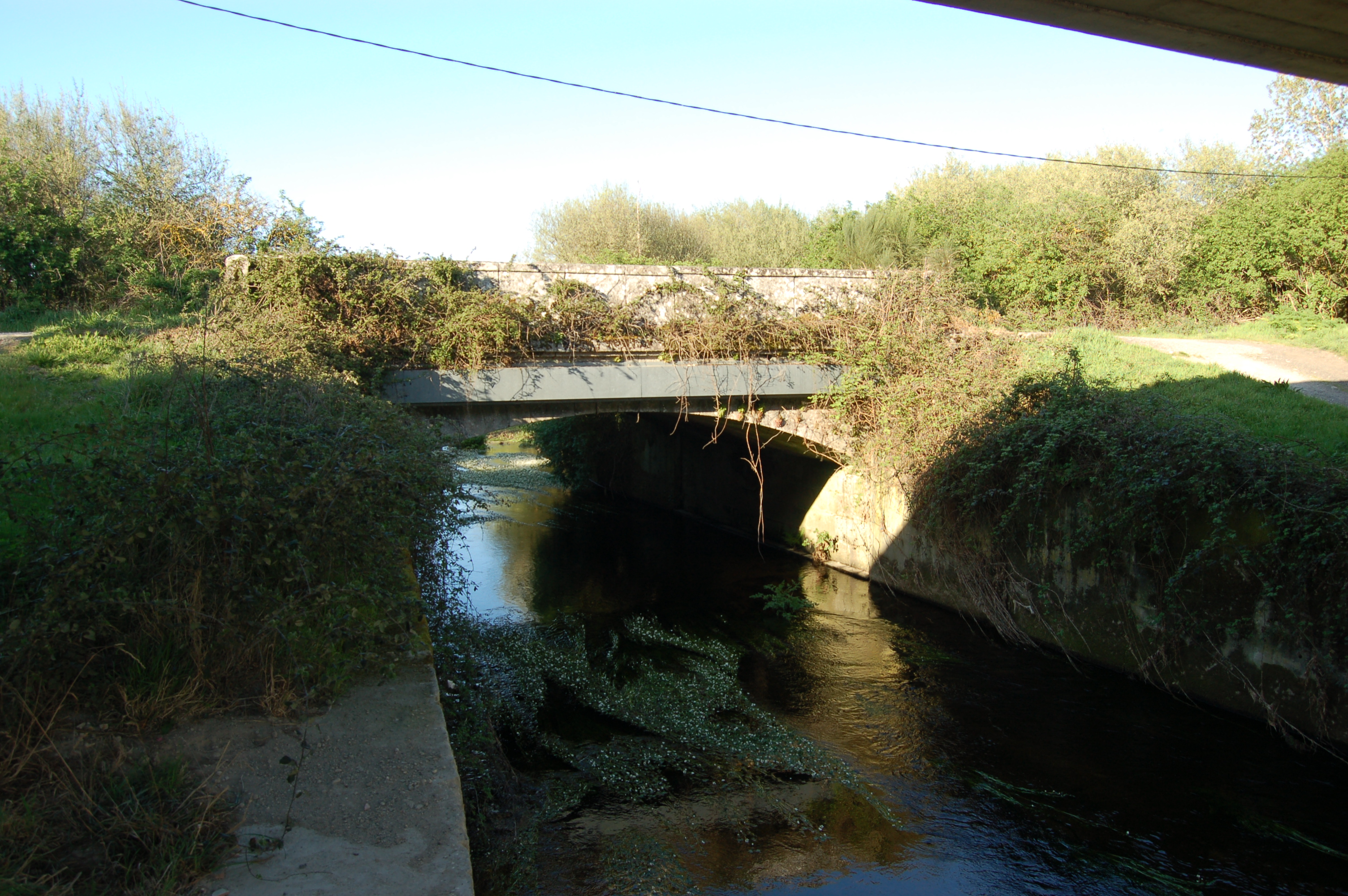
A bridge across the Limia at Boado, Ourense, Spain

The source of the Lima is Talariño Mountain at 975 metres (3,199 ft) above sea level, close to the village of Paradiña in the Sarreaus municipality (Ourense, Spain). In Spain, it extends for 41 kilometres (25 mi) and is known by regional names such as Alariño, Freixo and Mourenzo; however, the official term in Galicia is Limia.

It crosses the border into Portugal through the reservoir created by the Alto Lindoso Dam (Portuguese: Barragem do Alto Lindoso) close to Lindoso village, just west of the border between the two countries. The dam includes a hydro-electric plant, and creates a large reservoir on the Spanish side of the border. The reservoir flooded several villages in the Spanish municipality of Lobios, including Aceredo and Buscalque, O Bao, A Reloeira and Lantemil, in 1992, but after a prolonged drought over the Spanish winter of 2021/2022, the "ghost village" of Aceredo had emerged and was again on dry land by February 2022.

The river runs through the municipalities of Ponte da Barca and Ponte de Lima, before reaching the Atlantic Ocean at Viana do Castelo.

== See also ==
- Rivers of Galicia
