= Igreja Matriz de Caminha =

Church in Caminha, Portugal

Caminha Parish Church
- Igreja Matriz de Caminha
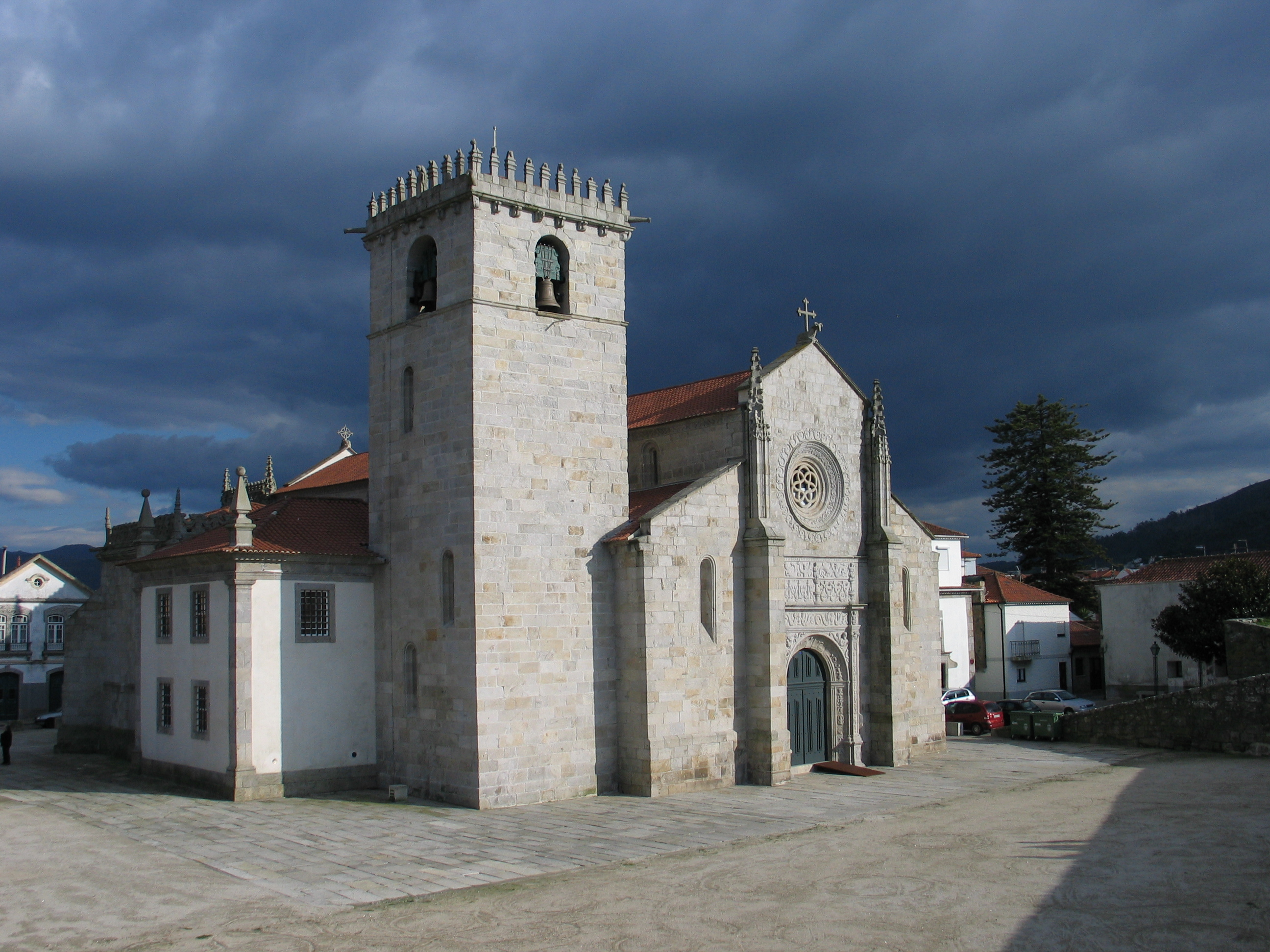
- 15th century church in Caminha / Igreja Matriz de Caminha

Religion
- Affiliation: Catholic Church
- Ownership: Portuguese state
- Status: Main Parish Church

Location
- Location: Caminha
- Country: Portugal
- Coordinates: 41° 52′ 41″ N, 8° 50′ 20″ W

Architecture
- Style: Gothic, Manueline and Renaissance
- Groundbreaking: 1488
- Completed: 18th century

Igreja Matriz de Caminha is a church in Portugal. It is classified as a National Monument.

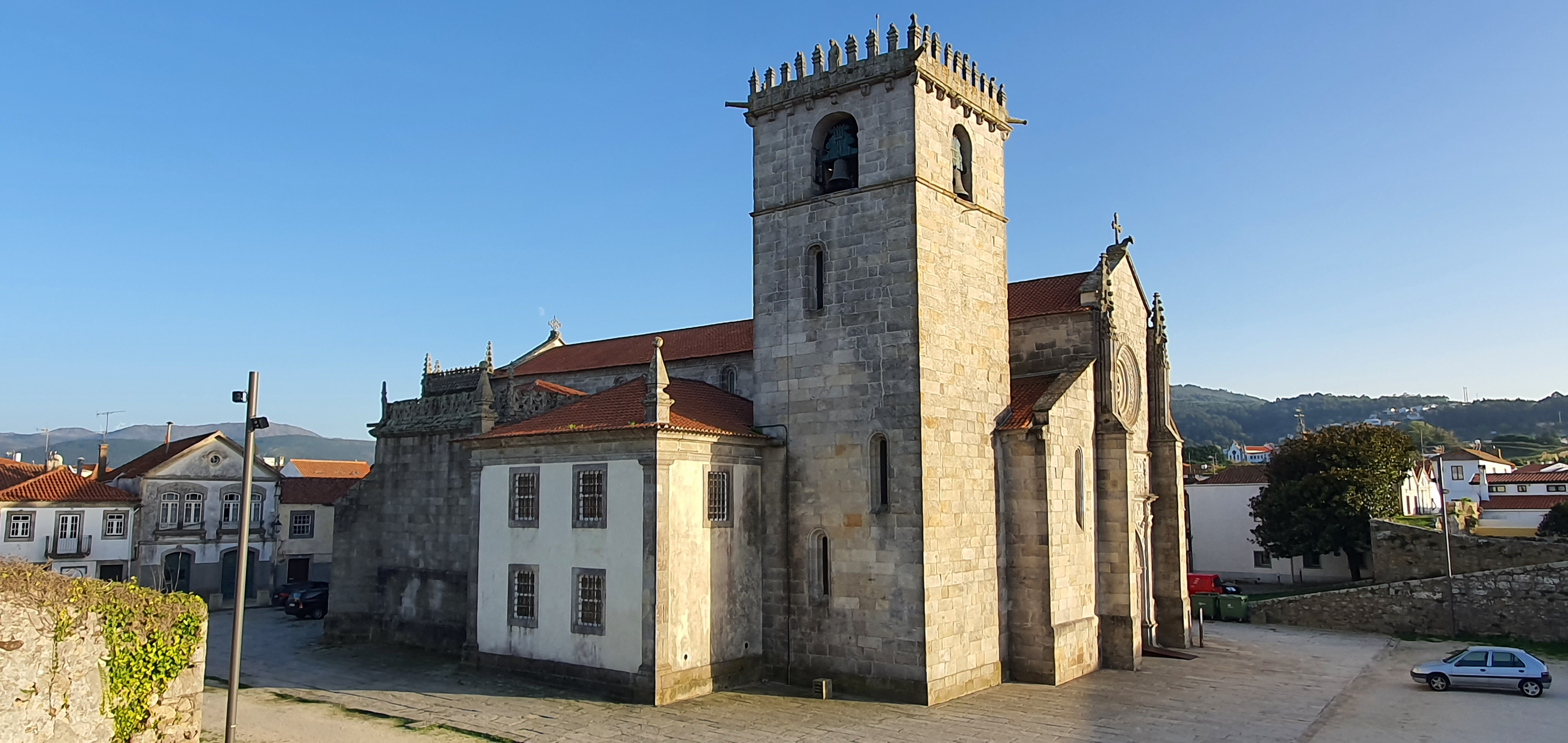
With view

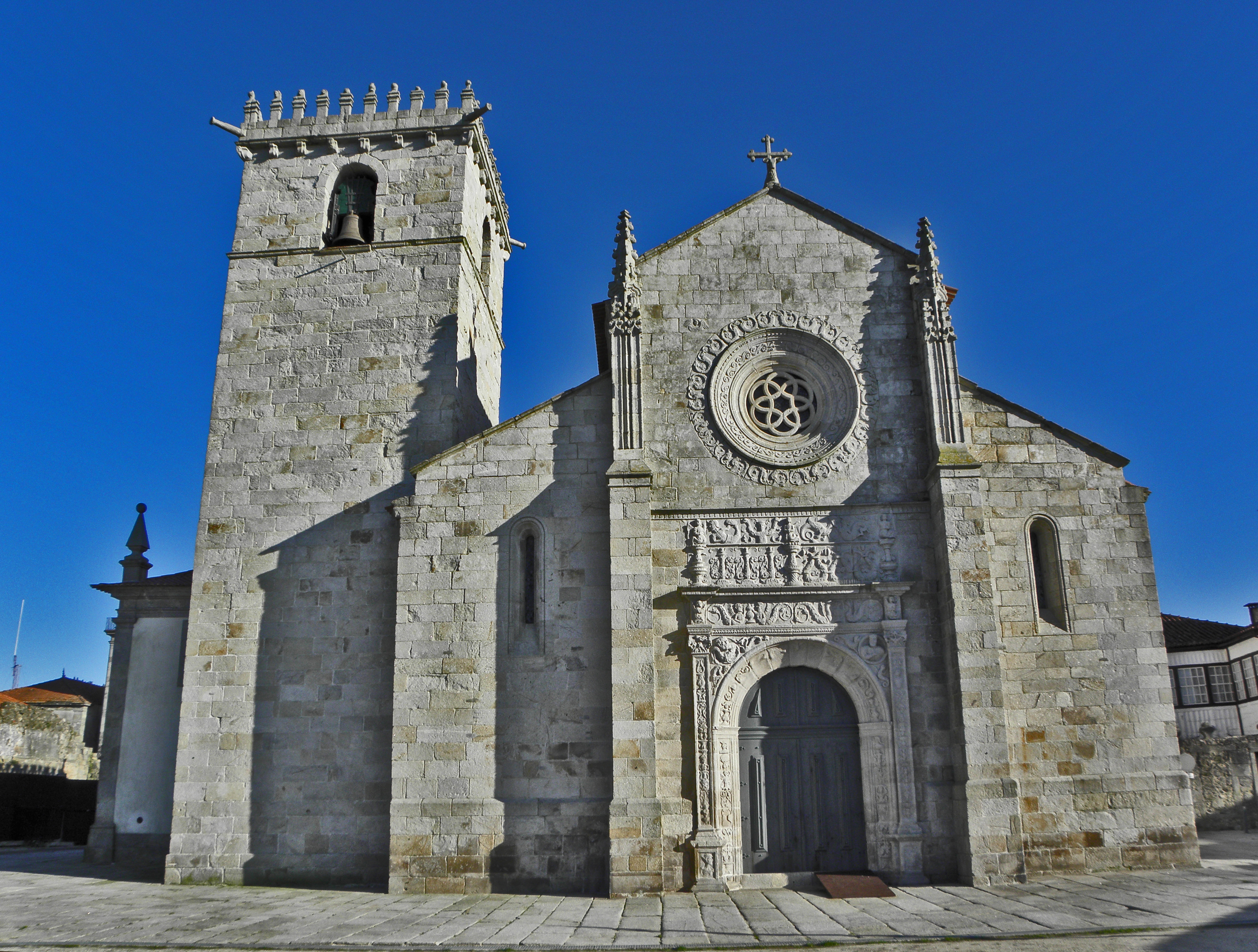
Main façade

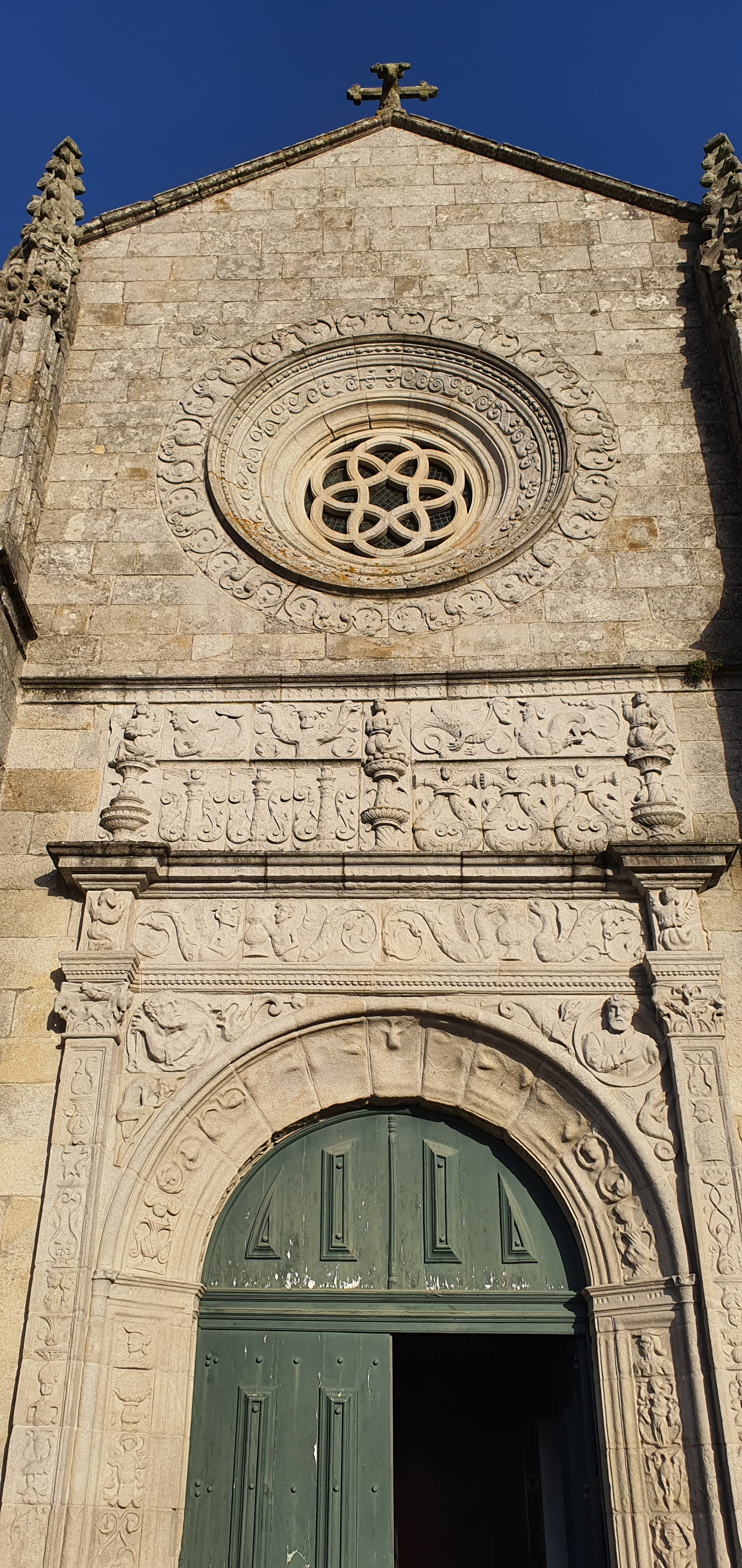
Main door

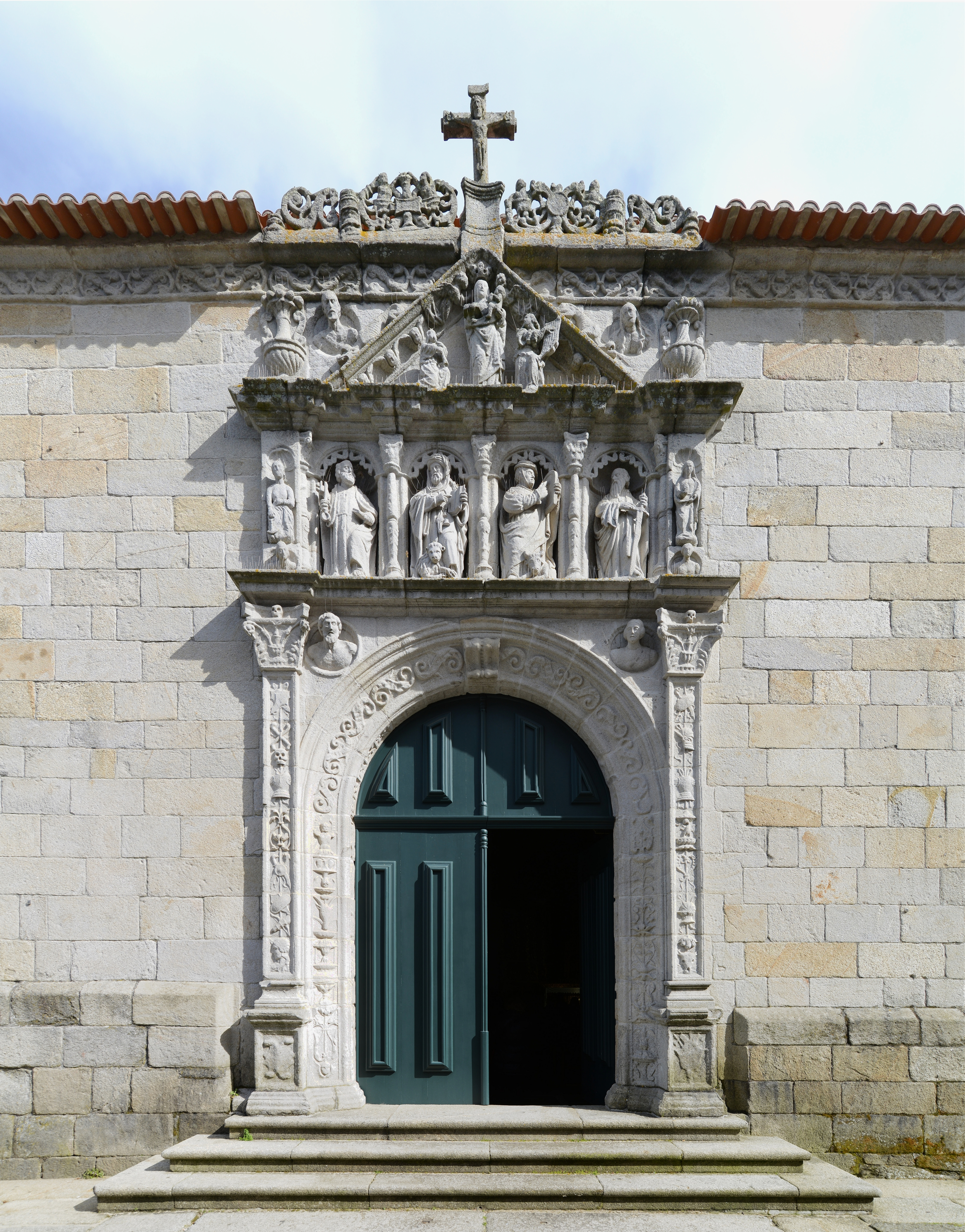
Side door

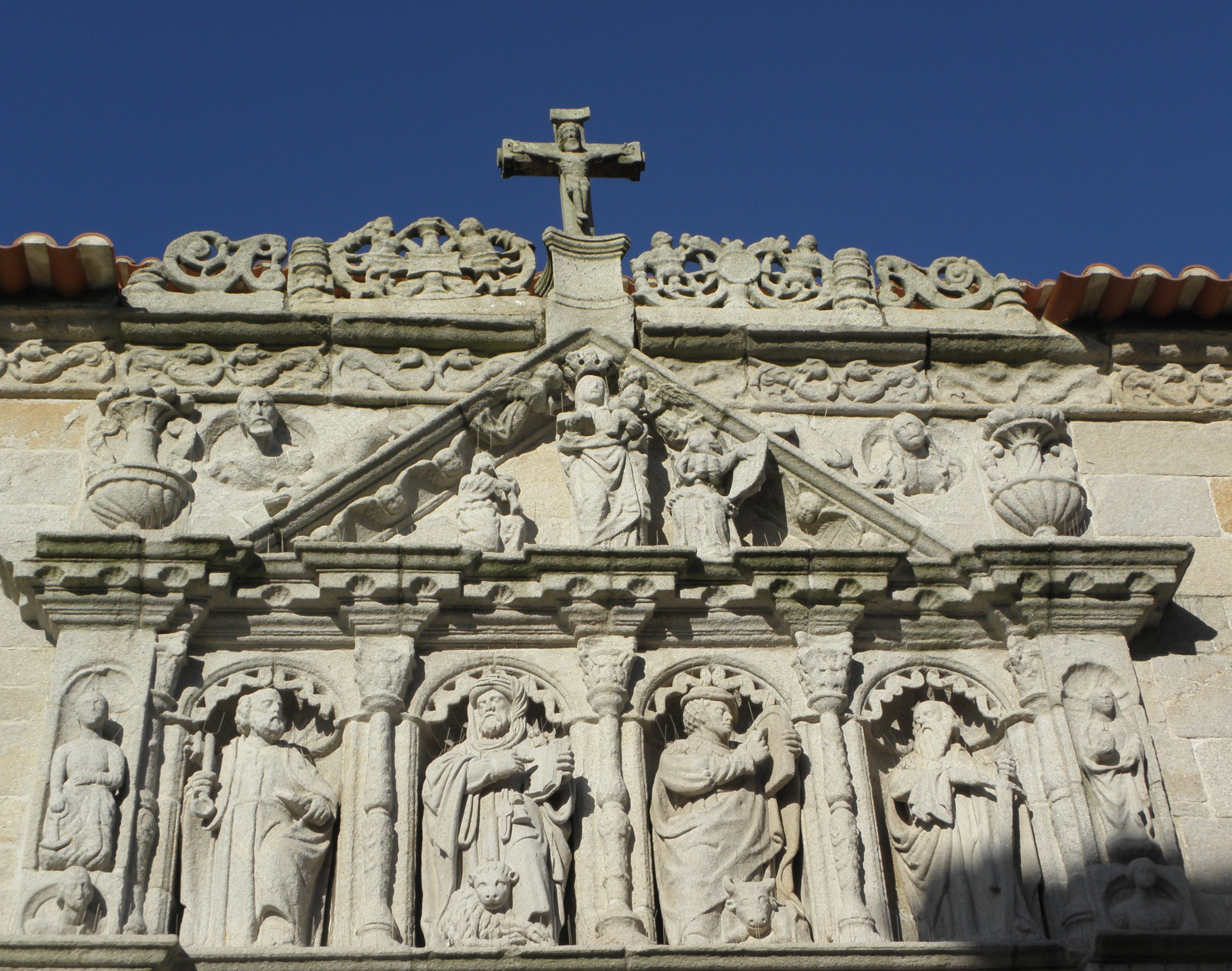
Side door tympanum

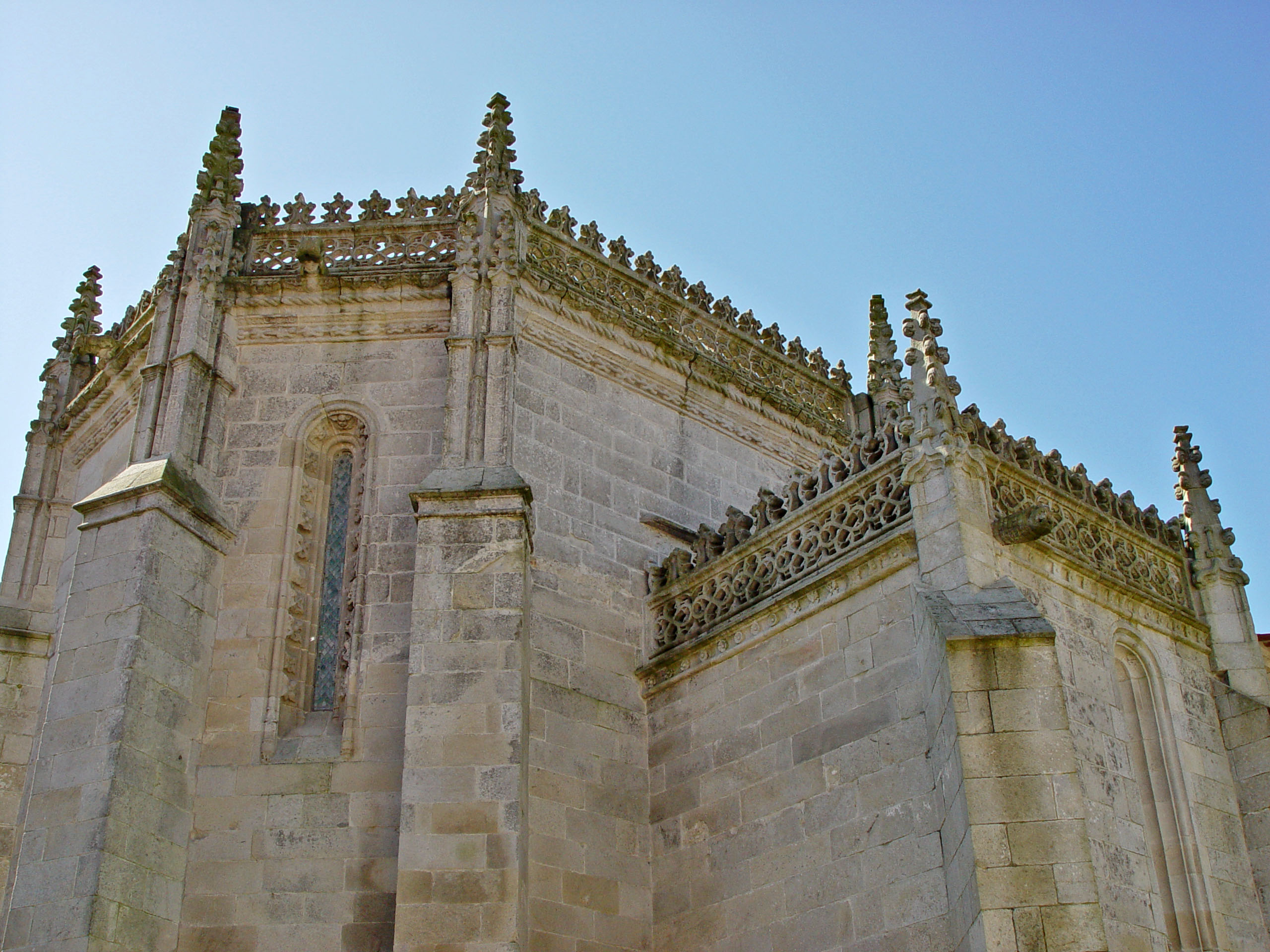
Back of the church

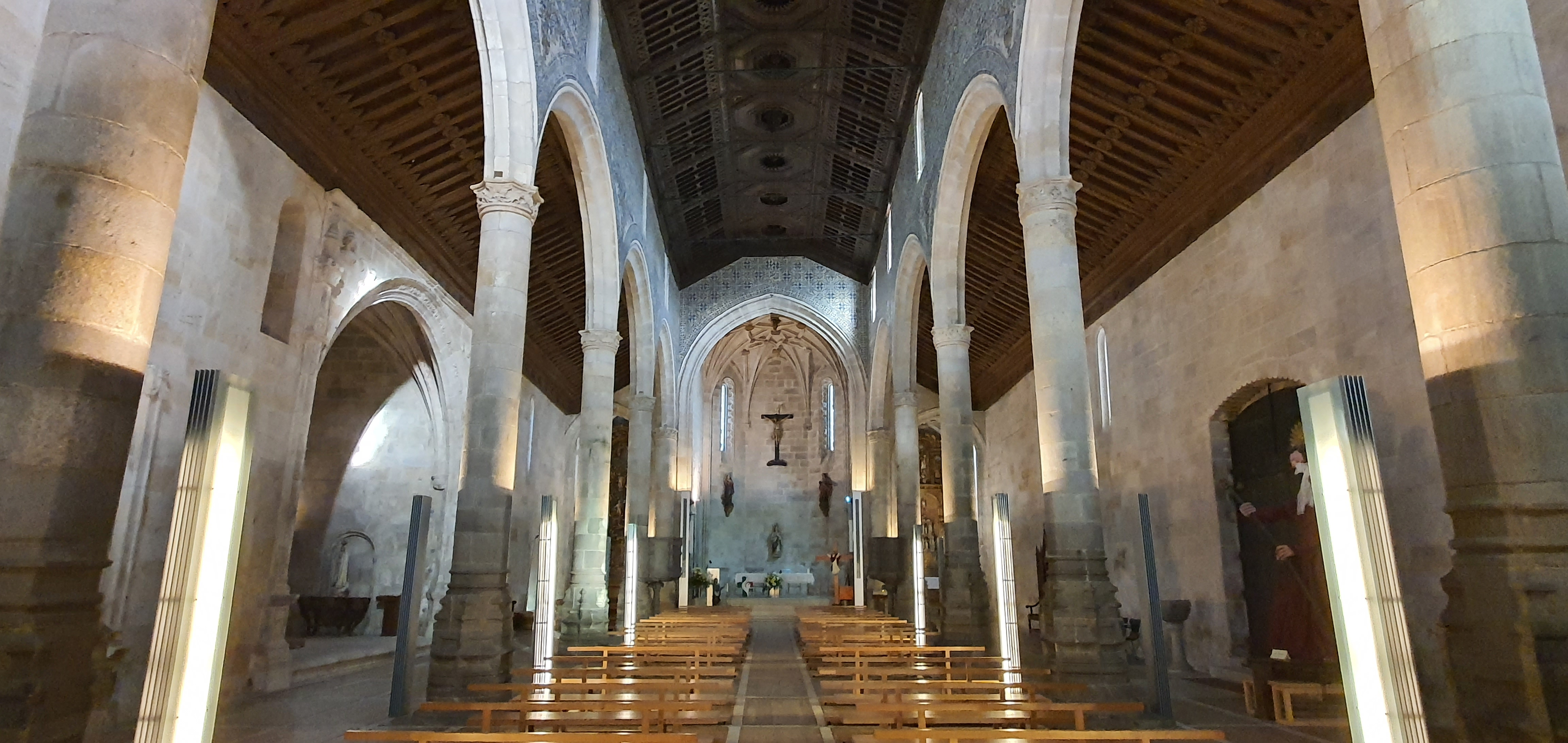
Inside view

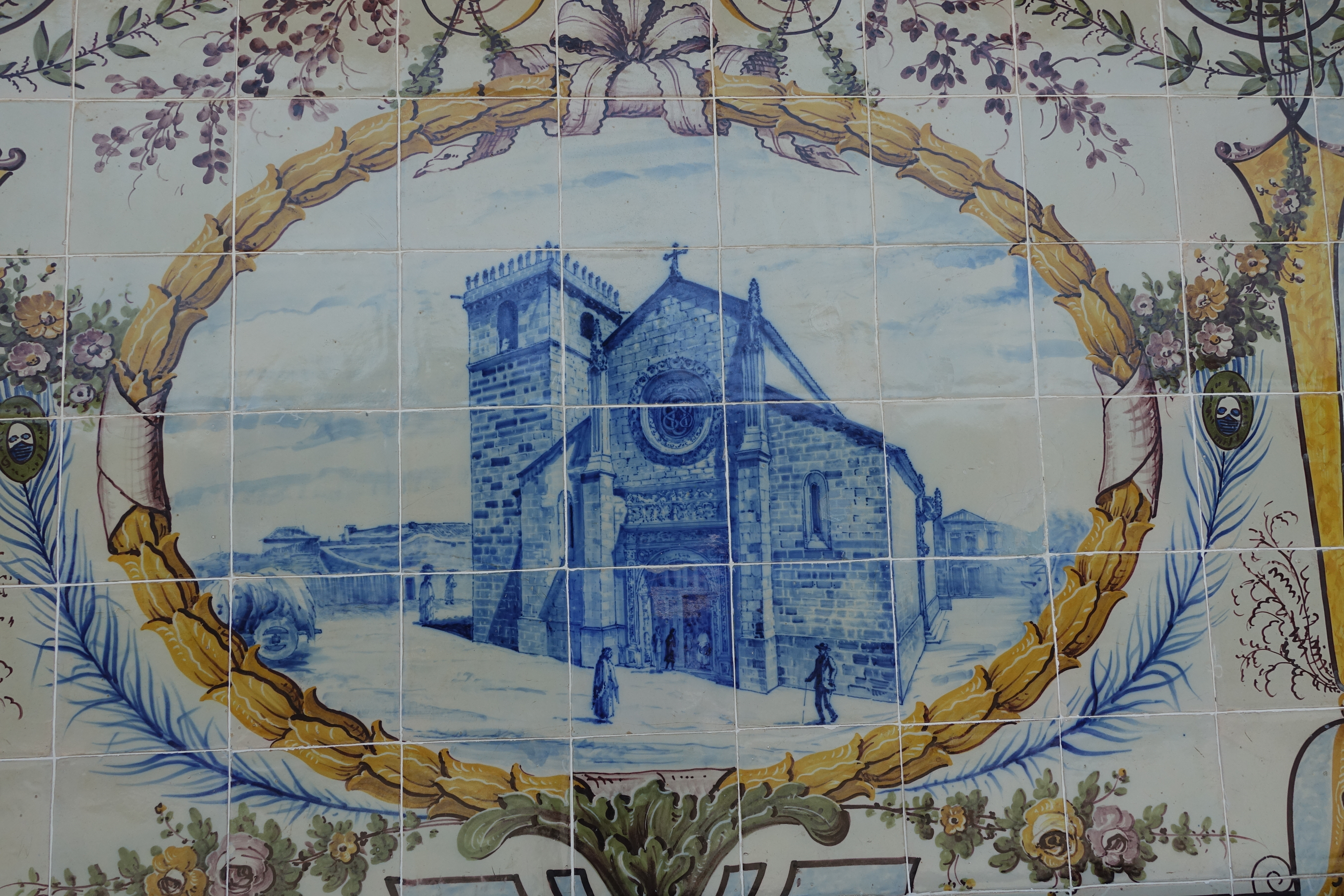
Tile in train station representing the church
