= Portuguese Romanesque architecture =

Architectural style of the 11th–12th centuries

The Old Cathedral of Coimbra with its fortress like appearance and battlemented. The two central openings are deeply recessed.

The Romanesque style of architecture was introduced in Portugal between the end of the 11th and the beginning of the 12th century. In general, Portuguese cathedrals have a heavy, fortress-like appearance, with crenellations and few decorative elements apart from portals and windows. Portuguese Romanesque cathedrals were later extensively modified, among others the Old Cathedral of Coimbra, although it only had some minor changes.

Chronological and geographical distribution of Romanesque buildings in Portugal are intimately connected with the territorial organization emerging from the Reconquista, being the fundamental reason for the differences between a locally influenced artistical phenomenon in the North of the country and a more "international" kind in buildings like Coimbra and Lisbon cathedrals. Romanesque architecture first developed in Minho and Douro regions (with Braga Cathedral being its reference) spreading later southwards to Coimbra. It is in the rural areas of the northwest and center regions that Romanesque buildings are more concentrated, being more dense in the margins of rivers Douro and Mondego.

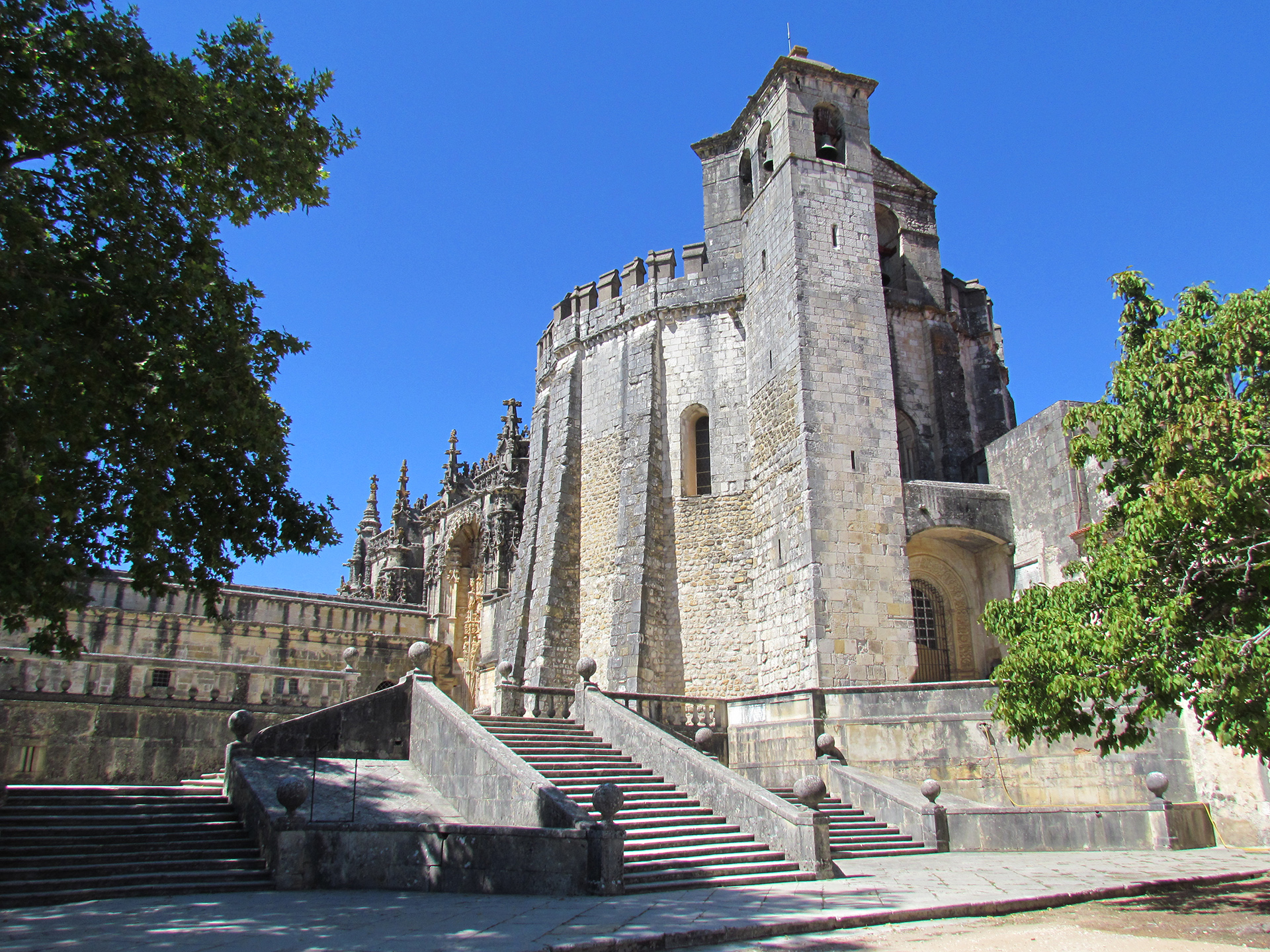
The famous round church (rotunda) of the Convent of Christ was built in the second half of the 12th century. Like some other templar churches throughout Europe, was modelled after the Dome of the Rock in Jerusalem.

== Introduction ==
It was in areas that had been recently added to Portuguese territory, thus more open to foreign influence, places where royal and ecclesiastical sponsorship were stronger, where French monastical communities settled in and foreign artists produced their works (like Coimbra and Lisbon), that we find the most artistically complete forms of Romanesque. As it expanded it became more local, mixing with earlier regional construction techniques and solutions.

Romanesque building construction activity gained pace after 1095, when Count Henry took possession of the County of Portugal. Count Henry came with noblemen and Benedictine monks from the Abbey of Cluny, which was headed by Henry's brother, Hugh. The Benedictines and other religious orders ended up giving great impulse to Romanesque architecture in Portugal during the whole 12th century. Examples of those rural monastical and parish churches, most of them built in the 9th and 10th centuries with late High Middle Ages artistical features and before the expansion of Romanesque architecture, are the Monastery of Rates, one of the best iconographical buildings of this style in Portugal, the churches of Paço de Sousa Monastery, Santa Maria de Airães and the Monastery of São Pedro de Ferreira, among others.

Their communities first followed the Benedictine rule but were later deeply influenced by the monastical reforms in the 11th century, mainly the Cluniac, reflected in the adoption of newly Romanesque architectural features, creating some very regional and rich decorative and architectural solutions.

== Pre-Romanesque architecture: The Mozarabic art ==
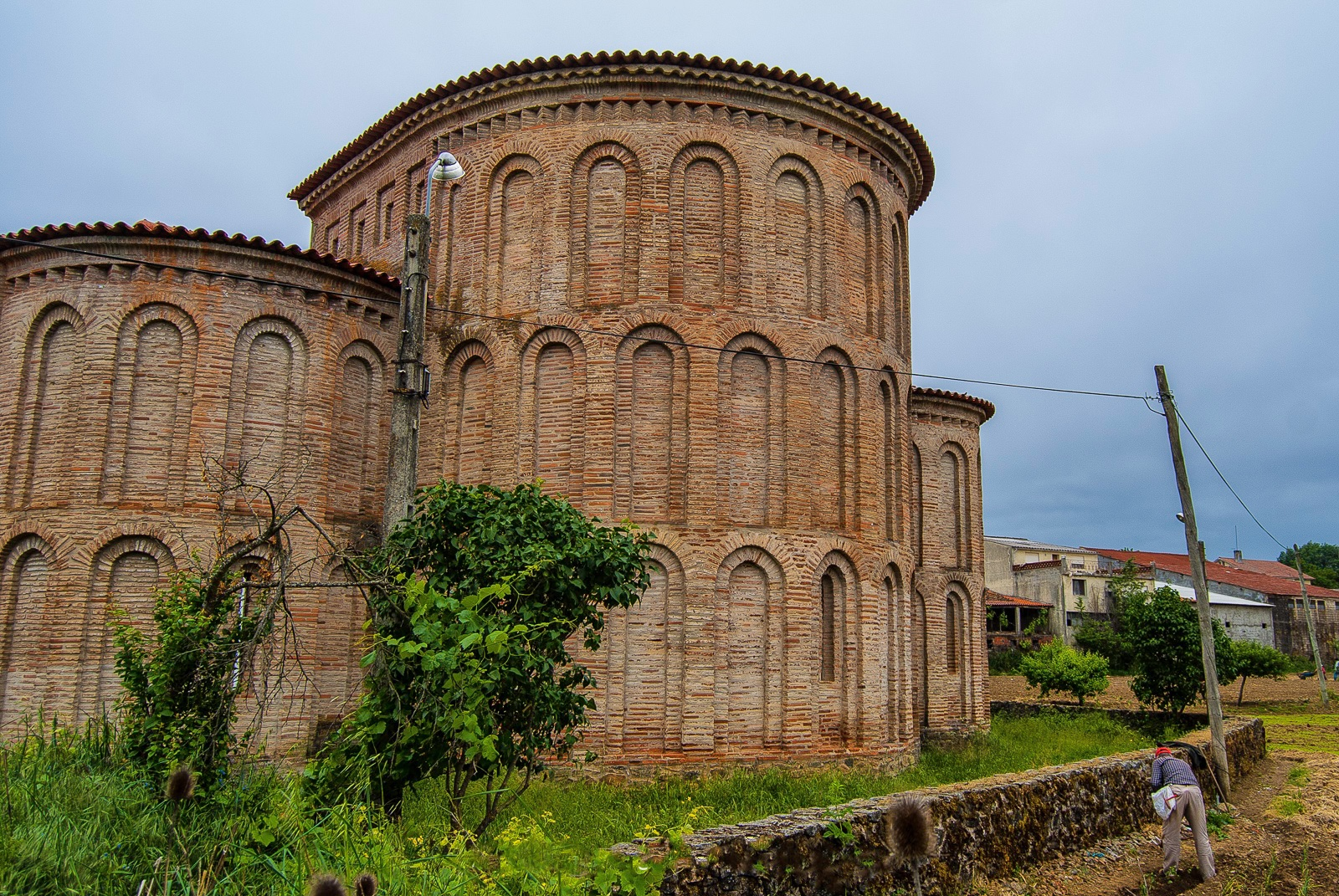
Apse of Castro de Avelãs Monastery, a mix of Mozarabic and Asturian-Leonese style.

Mozarabic art refers not only to the artistic style of Mozarabs (from musta'rab meaning "Arabized"), Iberian Christians living in Al-Andalus who adopted some Arab customs without converting to Islam, preserving their religion and some ecclesiastical and judicial autonomy, but also to those same communities that migrated north to the Christian Kingdoms, bringing with them an architectural phenomenon in which Christian and Islamic artistic elements were fused together.

Although Mozarabic communities maintained for the practice of their religious rites some of the Visigothic churches predating the Islamic occupation, the extent of this Visigothic artistical heritage is hard to pinpoint, as most monuments from the previous period have been lost. Nevertheless, those buildings that did survive seem to hold on tenaciously to traditions of Visigothic architecture with few, if any, Islamic features. All this includes them in the ample concept of Pre-Romanesque architecture. Besides this possible Visigothic connection, Mozarabic architecture in Portugal also came in contact with Asturian art, identified with the artistic creations that were being produced during the 9th century specifically in the territories that comprised the Kingdom of Asturias. However this artistic activity, in general (and architecture specifically) was not limited to this area or this century, it encompassed the whole northern peninsula and continued during the next century.

The most exceptional example of Mozarabic architecture in Portugal is the Church of São Pedro de Lourosa, near Coimbra. There is no doubt that this rural church was founded sometime around 912 AD (950 by the Era of Caesar, corresponds to 912 by Christian Era) according to an authentic inscription found in one of the transept arms. Despite a number of Asturian references to the church's engravings, the influences of the architectural models favoured by the Mozarabs are clearly visible in the modulation of the masonry and mainly in the decorative elements of the cornices (use of the Chambranle) and the design of horseshoe arches, typical of Mozarabic style. Its basilican type structure comprises a small transept separating the chancel from the main body of the building (called a Narthex), and a row of three surmounted arches supported by columns separating the central nave from the side aisles. During restoration works carried out in the mid-20th century, various architectural features were found that would have belonged to an earlier Visigothic church.

Other examples of Mozarabic monuments in Portuguese territory are the Chapel of São Pedro de Balsemão in Lamego, the Cathedral of Idanha-a-Velha, with a more Visigothic influence but still used by the Mozarabic community of the region, the Church of São Gião, near Nazaré, and the unique apse of the old monastery of Castro de Avelãs (Bragança), that presents not only a Mozarabic flavour but also a deep fusion with Asturian-Leonese architectural features. Most scholars had identified its construction from the late 12th and early 13th centuries, although new archeological findings have challenged that date and put its origin back in the 11th century.

Examples of Mozarabic art in Portugal

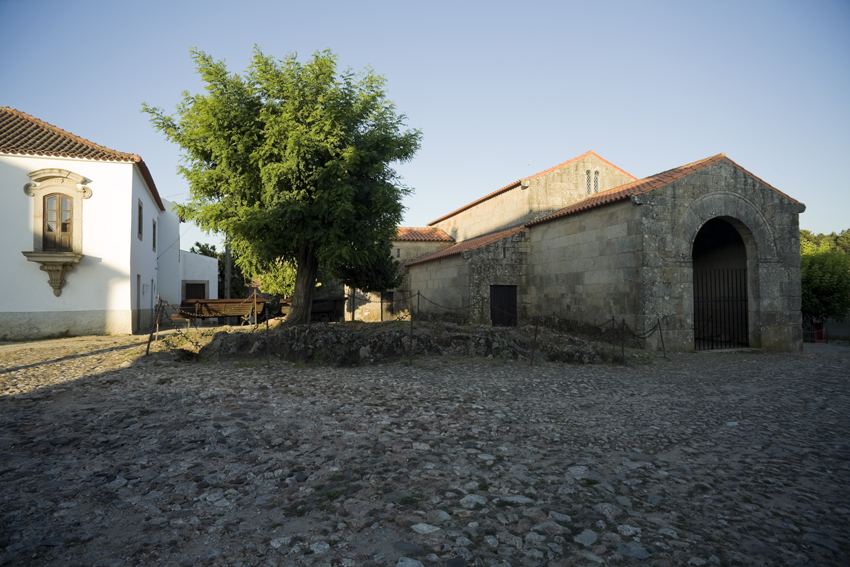
Facade with narthex of São Pedro de Lourosa Church.

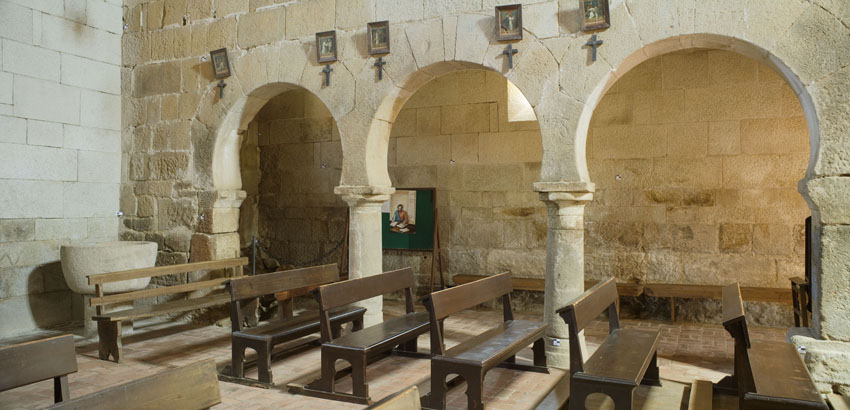
Mozarabic style horseshoe arches in São Pedro de Lourosa Church.

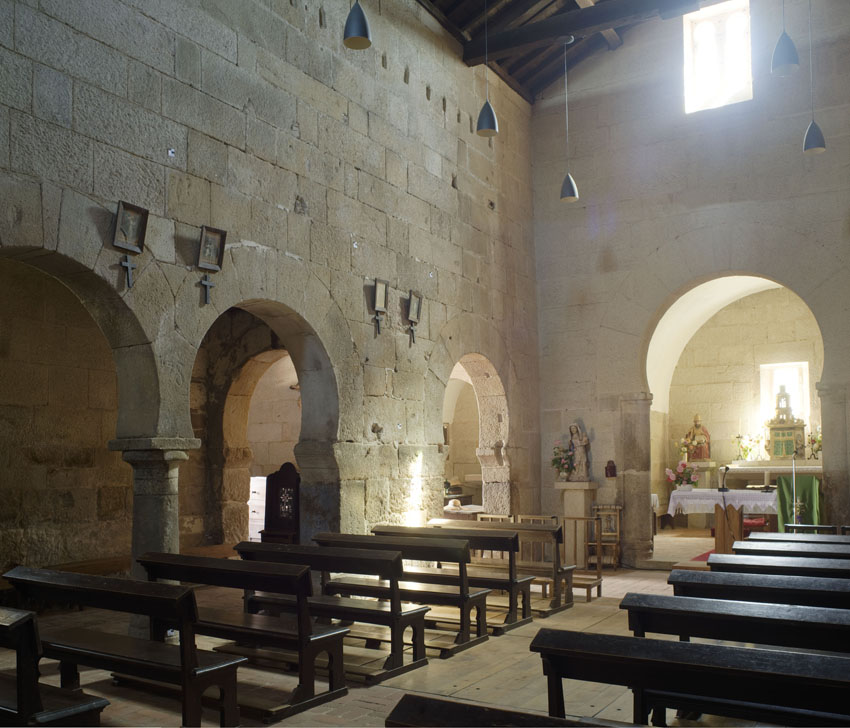
Central nave of the Church of São Pedro de Lourosa (Coimbra)

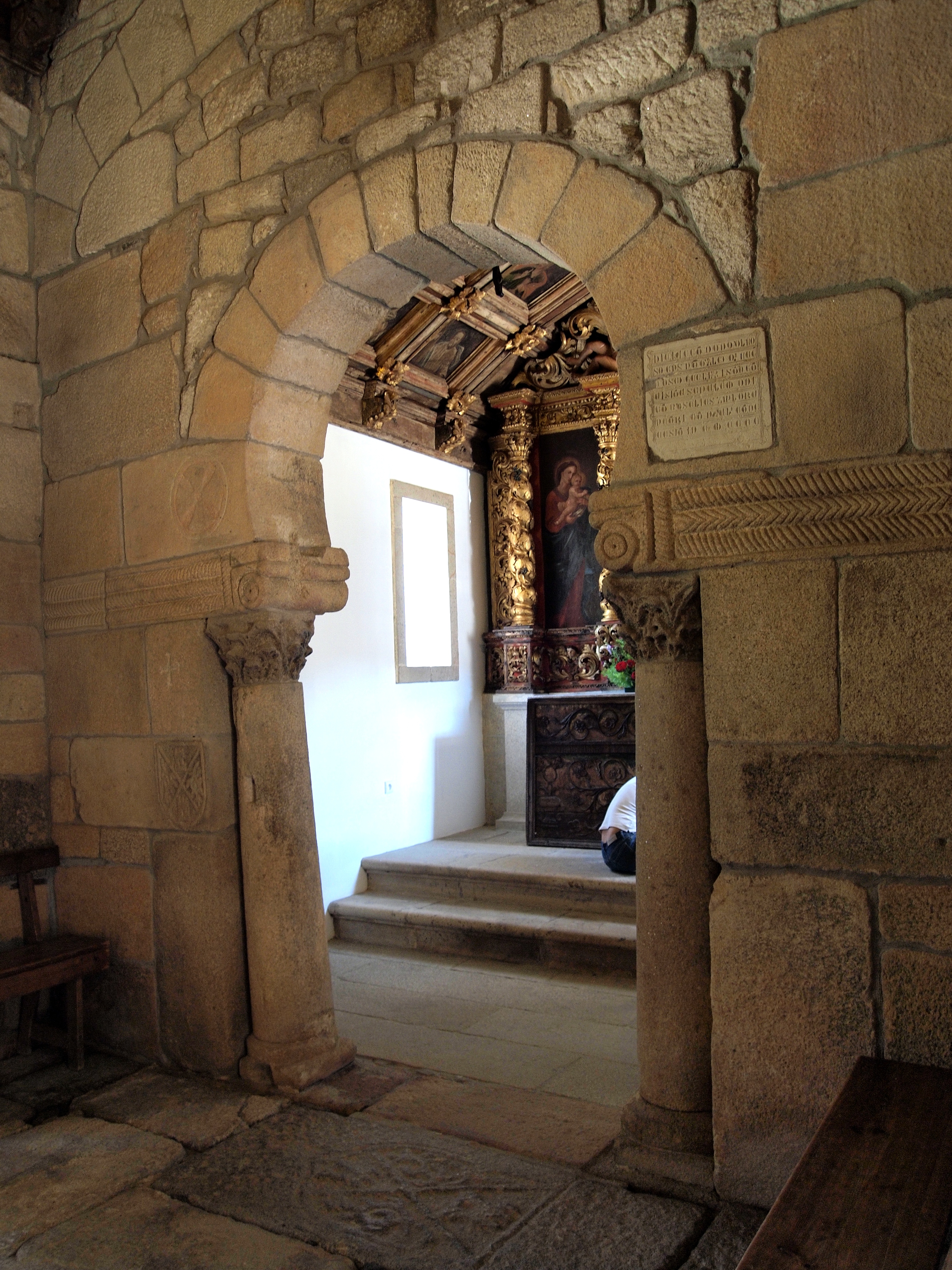
Horseshoe arch and chambranle in São Pedro de Balsemão Chapel (Lamego).

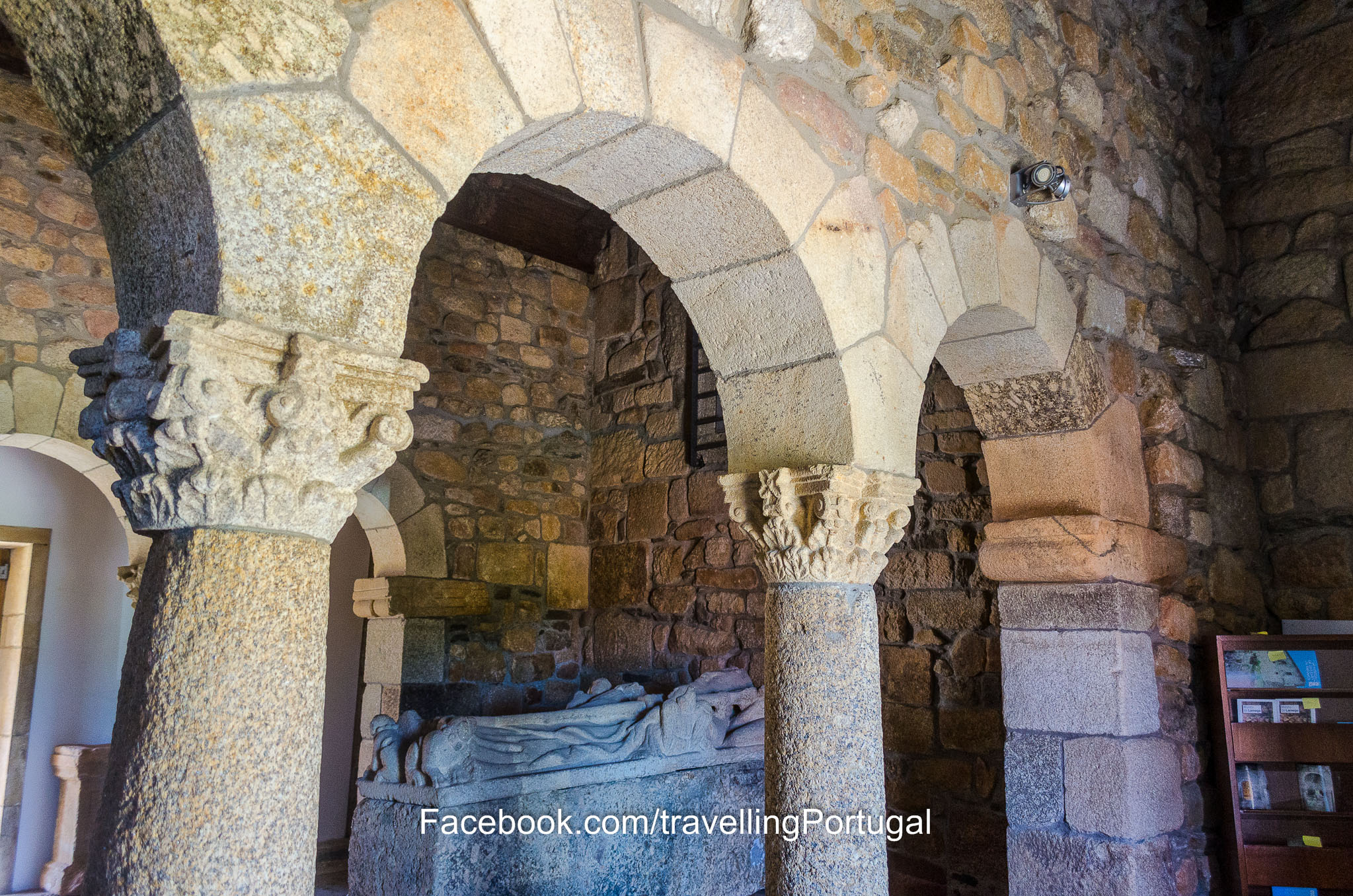
Corinthian-kind capitals from the Visigothic period in São Pedro de Balsemão Chapel.

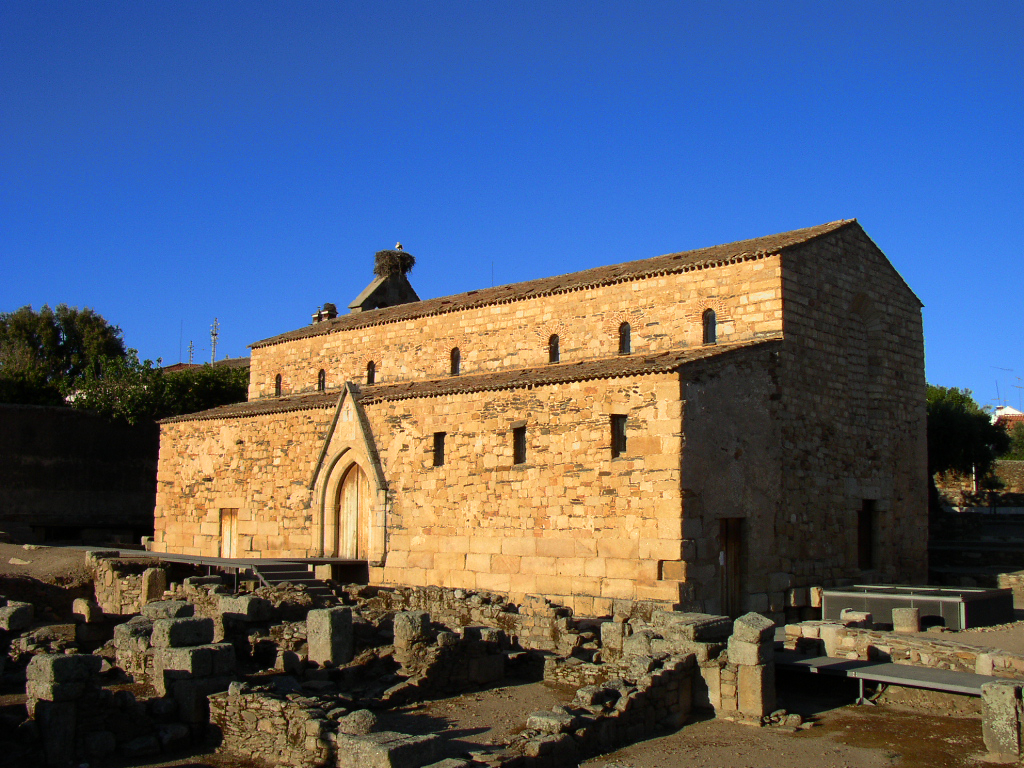
Originally from the Visigothic period, it has some minor Mozarabic (and later Romanesque and Gothic) features (Idanha-a-Velha).

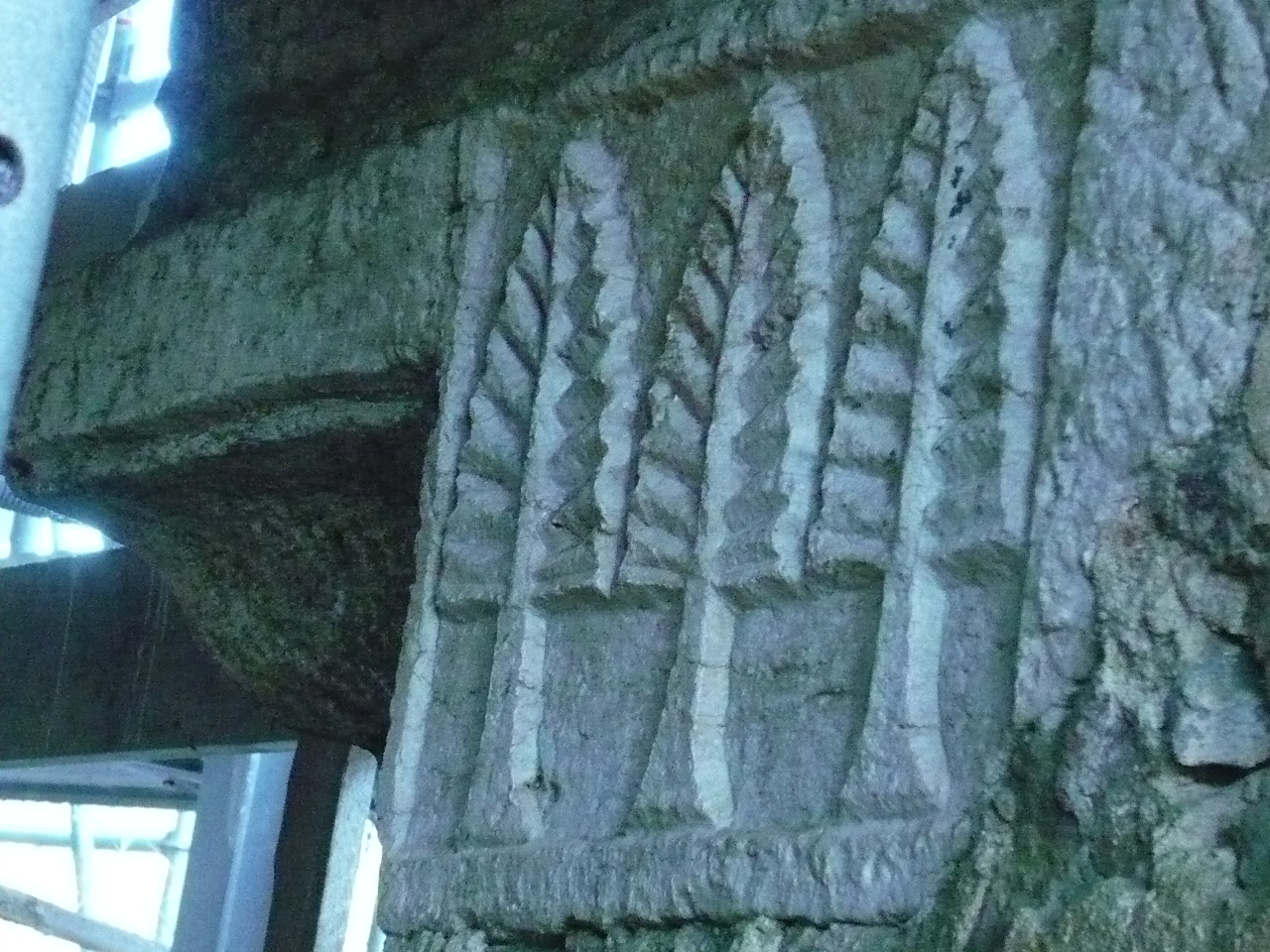
Mozarabic vegetalist motifs in the Church of São Gião.

== Rise and development of Romanesque in Portugal (11th to 13th century) ==
In Portugal, the Romanesque architecture comes in late 11th century within a wider phenomenon of European cultural and religious spreading to the Iberian Peninsula, influenced by the Cluniac monastical reforms and the arrival of the Orders of Cluny (after 1086), Cister (or Citeaux) (1144), St. Augustine (after 1131) and the Military-Religious Orders of the Knights Hospitaller (1121), and the Knights Templar (1126). The Romanesque architecture, through its prestige, relates with the rise and assertion of Portuguese independence.

Developing itself later than witnessed in the rest of Europe, in Portugal it only gained real significance after the second quarter of the 12th century, although previous buildings of the same style already existed. Various factors contribute to this aspect, mainly the unstable environment experienced in the Iberian Peninsula at the time due to the Reconquista and the consequent political reorganisation of peninsular geography. In fact, one of the most significant aspects of Romanesque architecture in the Peninsula, but particularly in Portugal, is the noticeable connotation that we find between its spreading and land organisation and occupation. The arrival in Portugal of the religious orders mentioned above must be understood in the general context of the Reconquista. In fact, those monastical institutions received immense privileges from the Portuguese monarchs and nobility, contributing to the security of the territory, but above all, to its social organization. This Reconquista took place from North to South, resulting in the same spread of Romanesque architecture with a decreasing density to the South. Almost no Romanesque artifacts survive in Southern Portugal.

The first Romanesque churches in the North were simple constructions, consisting of a nave with a timber roof and a rectangular apse. Examples can be found at the Igreja de São Cristóvão de Rio Mau, at the Igreja de Santa Eulália do Mosteiro de Arnoso and at the Church of Fontarcada (with already a semicircular apse at the east end).

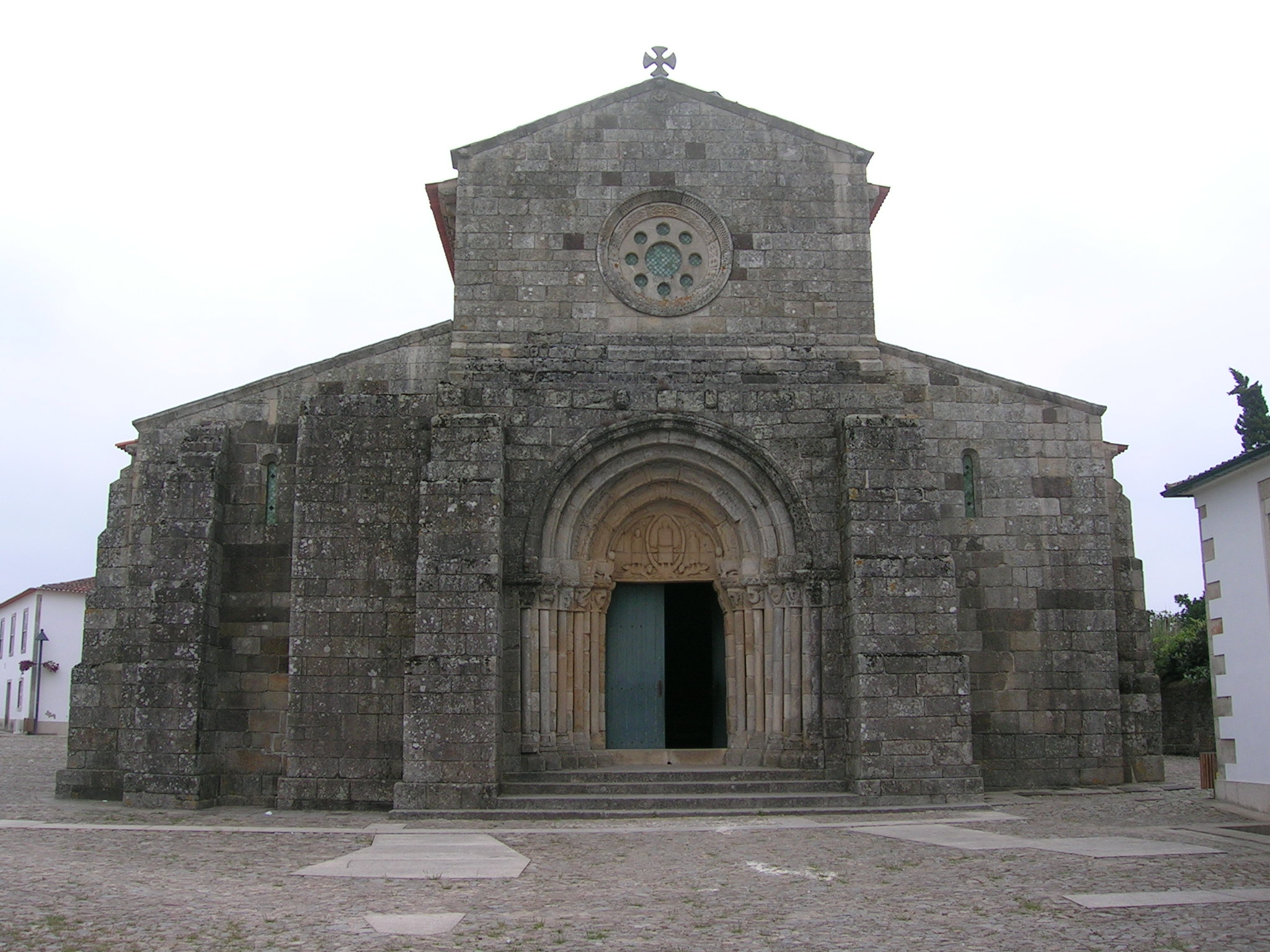
Main façade of Monastery of Rates old church, a Cluniac monastic building.

Expansion of the Romanesque style coincided with the reign of D.Afonso Henriques (1139–1185), a monarch with Burgundian background being the son of Count Henry and great-grandson of Robert II, King of France. During his reign Lisbon, Coimbra, Porto and Viseu Cathedrals were built and also the Augustinian Monastery of Santa Cruz, projected to be a royal pantheon. The construction began in 1131 and by 1150 the nave and its apses were already finished. Its structural shape and decorative features were a novelty in Portugal, showing that its architect was either probably French or came in contact with French Romanesque architecture from Burgundy like Tournus, Cluny, Paray-le-Monial or Romainmôtier.

Being a predominantly religious architecture, Portuguese Romanesque style was deeply related with ecclesiastical rural church parishes and monastic monasteries founded or rebuilt in the 12th and 13th centuries, with bishops, by royal mandate, their biggest sponsors.

== Romanesque cathedrals (Braga, Porto, Viseu, Coimbra and Lisbon) ==
=== Braga Cathedral ===
The Cathedral of Braga was rebuilt in the 1070s by Bishop Pedro and consecrated in 1089, although only the apse was finished at the time. He wished to create a pilgrimage church, with a three aisled nave, an ambulatory and a large transept.

Works increased during the tenure of D.Paio Mendes as archbishop (1118–37), after King D.Afonso Henriques granted a foral chart to the city as well as generous donations for its construction. It was then resumed and lasted until the middle of the 13th century. The original 12th-century building was built in the Burgundian Romanesque style of the monastery church of Cluny and influenced many other churches and monasteries in Portugal in that period. In later times the cathedral was greatly modified, so that today it is a mix of Romanesque, Gothic, Manueline and Baroque styles.

The original Romanesque Western façade of the cathedral has been totally suppressed, except for some archivolts and capitals of the main portal, heavily decorated with animal and human sculptured reliefs. The figures on one archivolt, with hens, foxes and a minstrel, may be telling a moralistic song like the ones from Roman de Renart, of French tradition.

Inside it has three aisles covered by a wooden roof, a transept and five Eastern chapels in the apse. On the north wall outside of the cathedral there is the small Chapel of São Geraldo, in memory of Geraldo of Moissac, Archbishop of Braga (1096–1108), of early Romanesque design, that may be a remnant of the late 11th-century building. This chapel was left outside of the final cathedral, perhaps due to a change of design in the 12th century. The nave is essentially Romanesque thanks to a "purifying" reform in the 20th century that suppressed most later additions, although some original capitals of the columns have been lost. D.Afonso, son of King D.João I, is buried in a 15th-century tomb made of bronze, which can be seen in the nave of the cathedral.

Several chapels were built adjacent to the cathedral in the Middle Ages. The Chapel of Kings (Capela dos Reis) was built around 1374 in the place where Count Henrique and Countess Teresa were buried. Their tombs were replaced in the early 16th century by new ones, with recumbent figures.

Details of Braga Cathedral

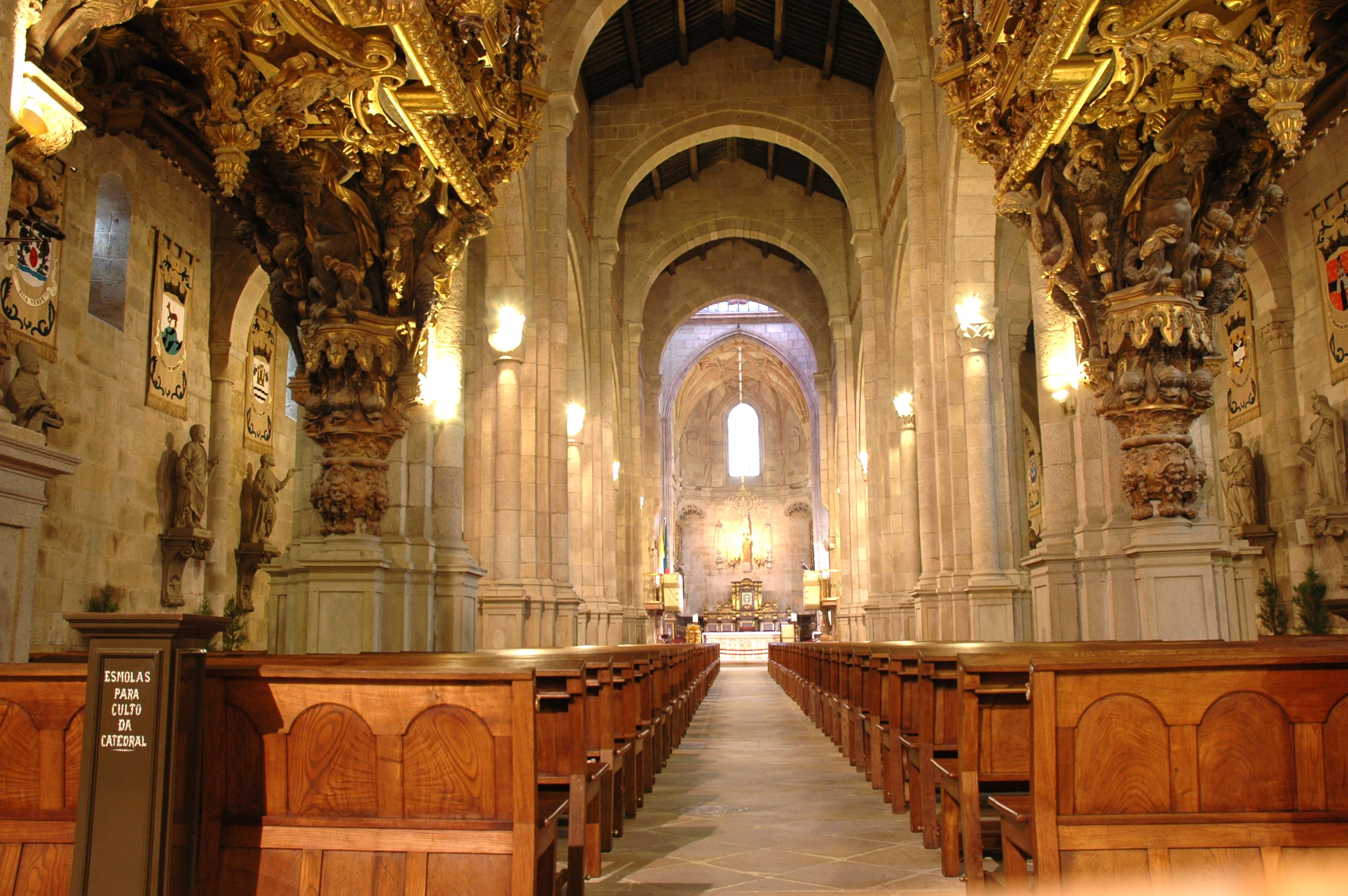
Three-aisled nave with a wooden roof.

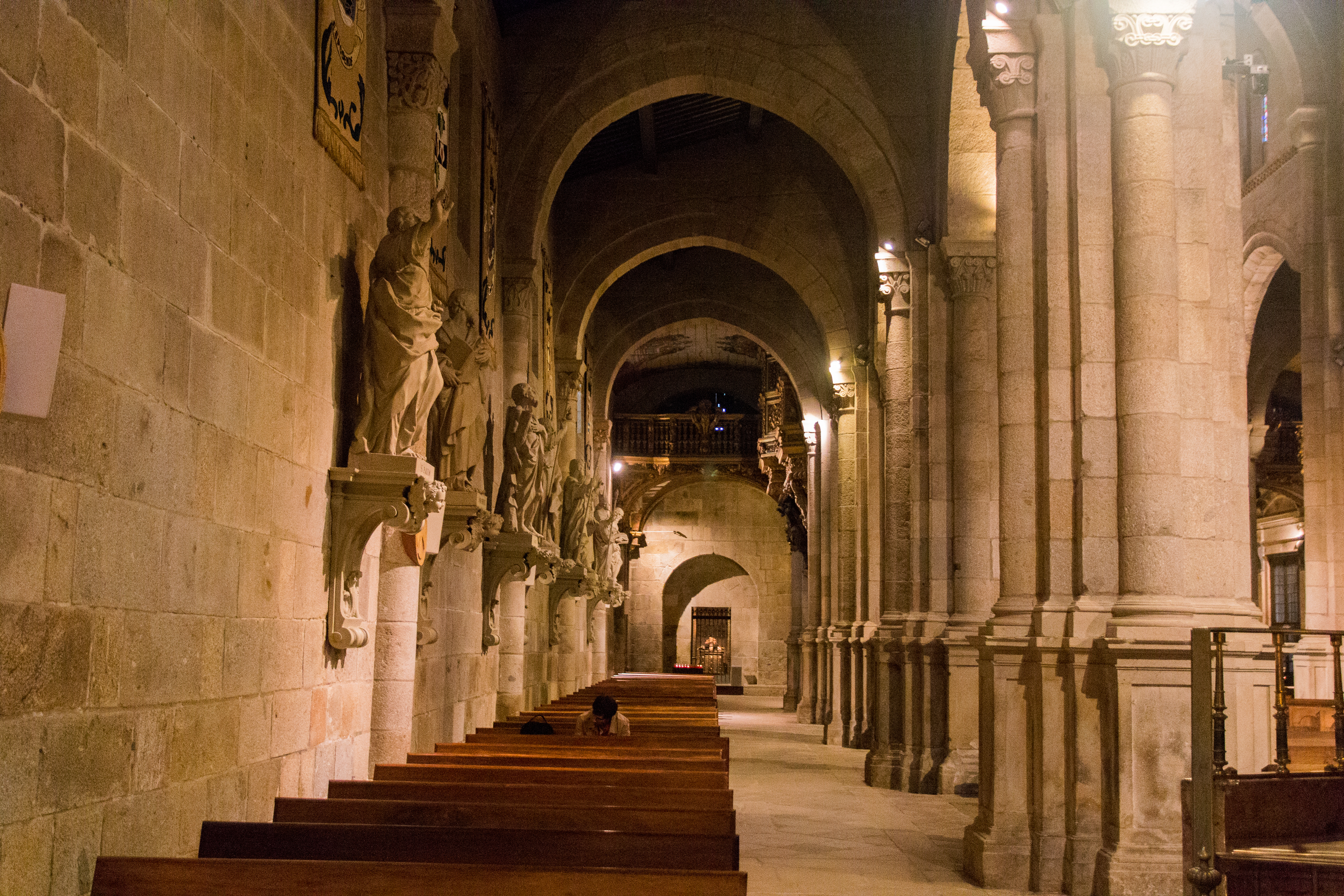
Lateral aisle and their arches.

Southern facade with a Romanesque portal.

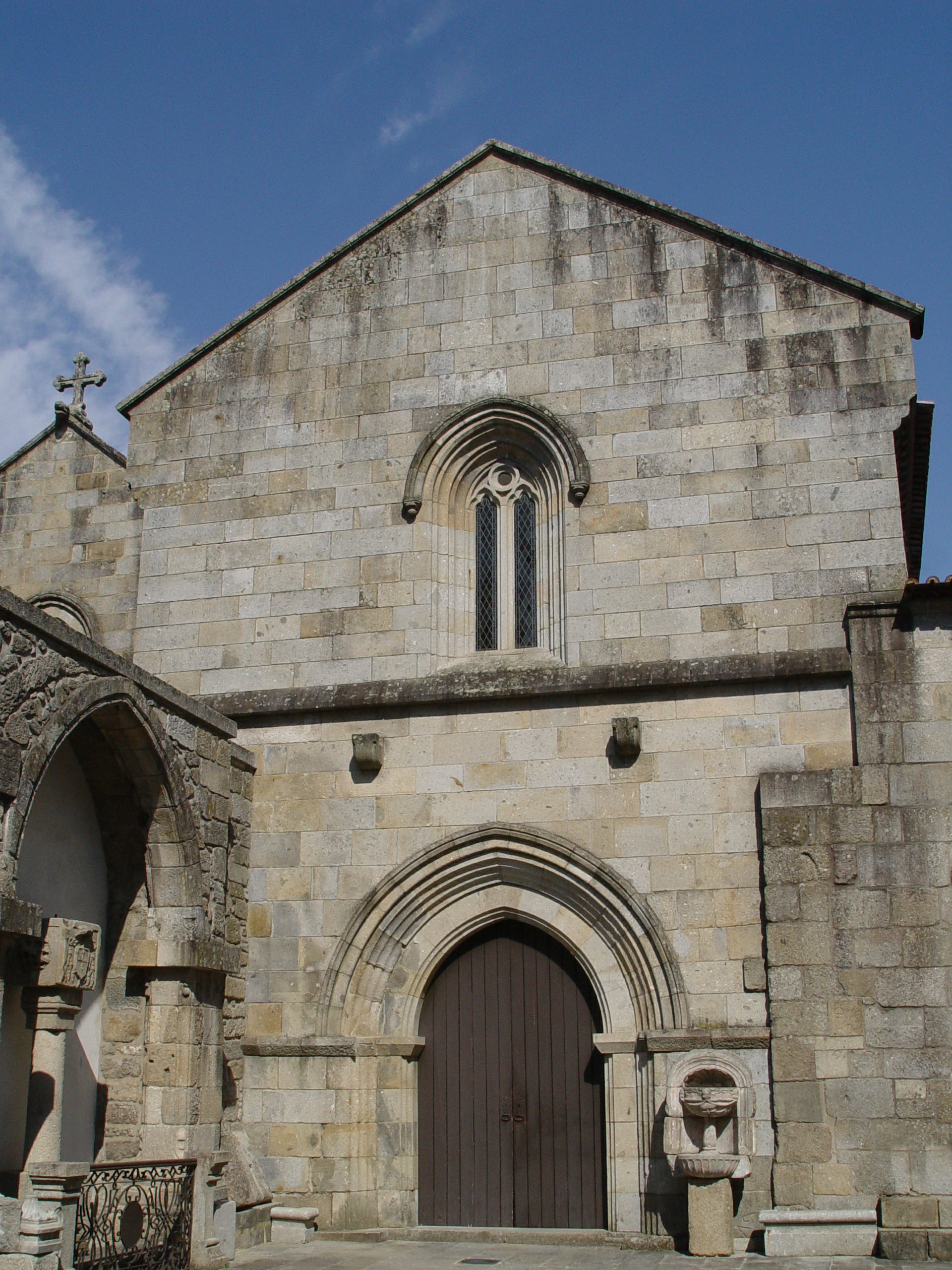
Chapel of São Geraldo.

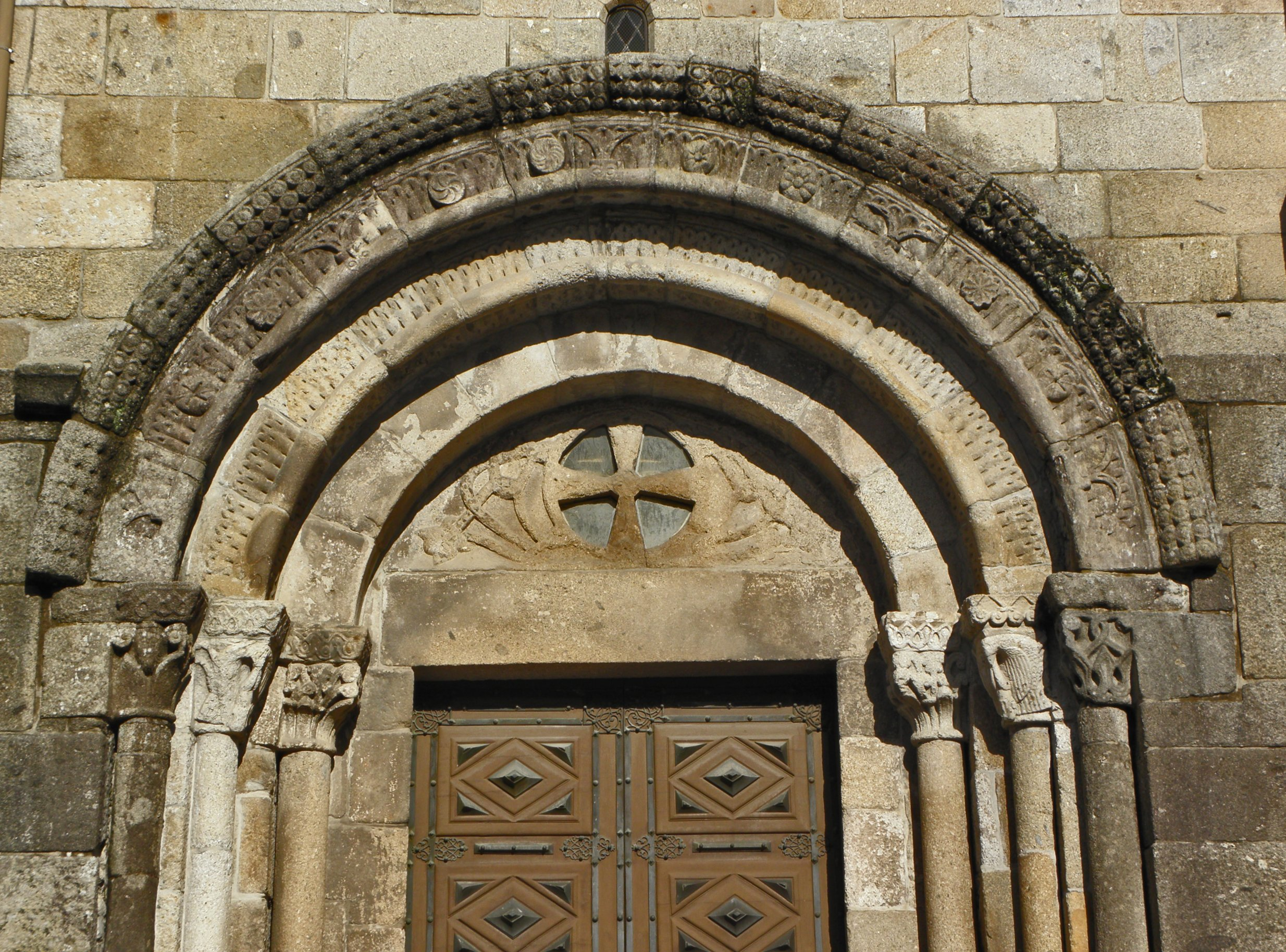
Detail of the tympanum and columns of the south portal.

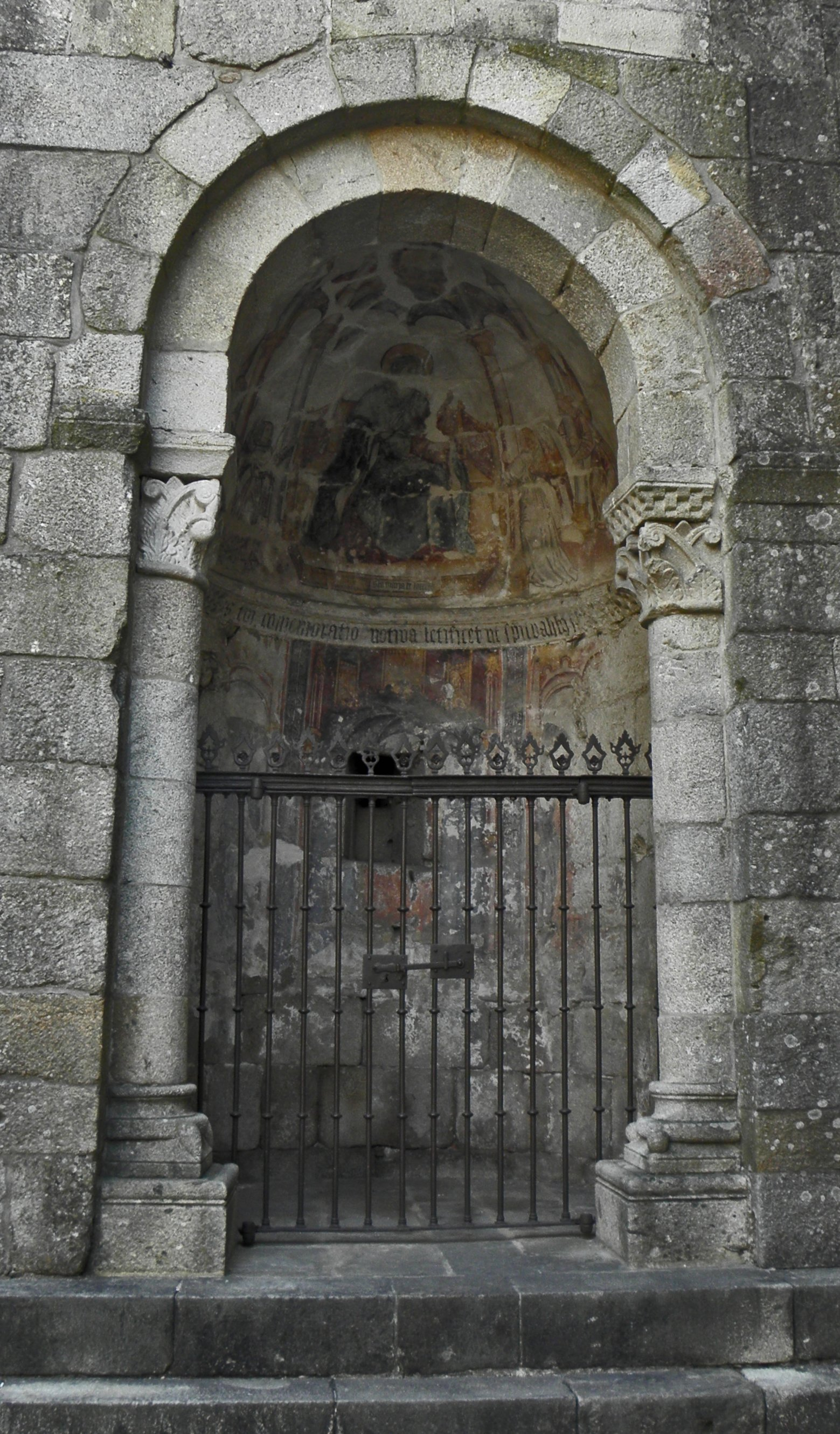
Chapel of Our Lady of Loreto with mural paintings.

=== Porto Cathedral ===
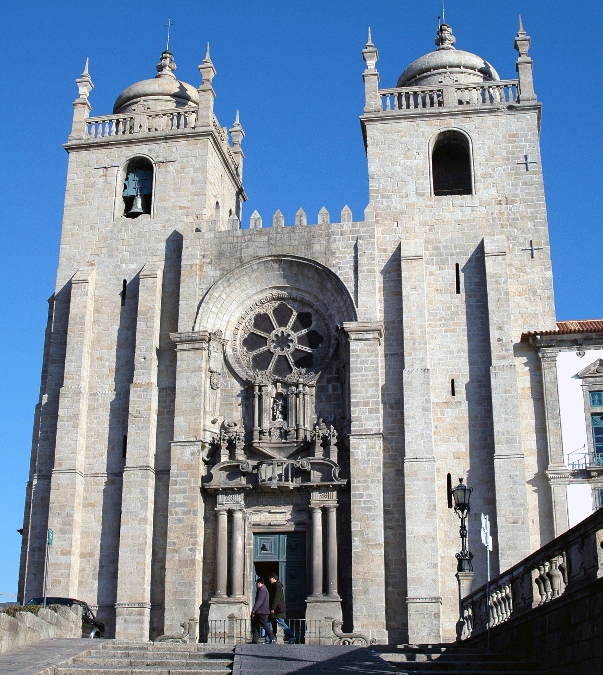
Porto Cathedral, its heavy and imposing facade with thick buttresses was later embellished by a Baroque portal.

The Porto Cathedral, located in the historical centre of the city of Porto, is one of the city's oldest monuments and one of the most important Romanesque monuments in the country. There is evidence that the city has been a bishopric seat since the Suevi domination in the 5th-6th centuries. The current building was built according to tradition around 1110 under the patronage of Bishop Hugo (1112–1136), but apparently the church is likely to have been built in the mid-12th century, after 1147, because the "De Expugnatione Lyxbonensi" appears to describe a small church that appears to match the old pre-Romanesque cathedral built in the 9th-10th centuries. As such, the building was likely built later, as the artistic evidence, that links the Romanesque of this church to the area of La Rochelle, supports. The church was only completed in 1557, when the Manueline lantern tower was installed.

The cathedral is flanked by two square towers, each supported with two buttresses and crowned with a cupola. The façade lacks decoration and is rather architecturally heterogeneous. It shows a Baroque porch and a beautiful Gothic wheel window under a crenellated arch, giving the impression of a fortified church. The Romanesque nave is rather narrow and is covered by barrel vaulting. It is flanked by two aisles with a lower vault. The stone roof of the central aisle is supported by flying buttresses, making the building one of the first in Portugal to use this architectonic feature.

This original building has suffered some alterations (minored by the archaizing restorations of the Estado Novo between 1927 and 1945) but the general aspect of the building has remained a mix of Romanesque and Gothic.

Also to be referenced the elegant Gothic cloister, built between the 14th and the 15th centuries during the reign of King D.João I, who married English Princess Philippa of Lancaster in this cathedral in 1387.

Details of Porto Cathedral

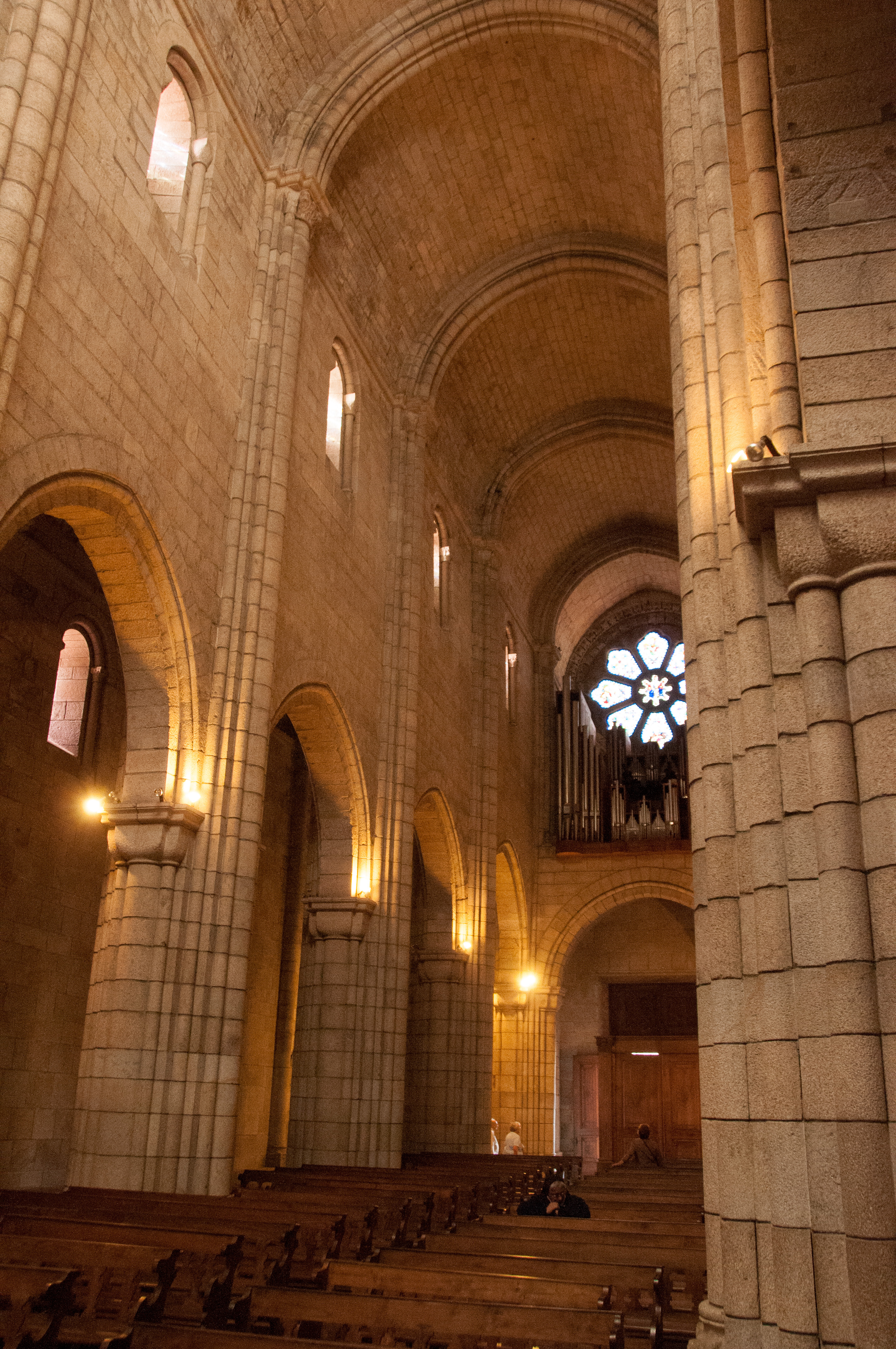
The nave barrel vaulting is supported by thick heavy columns

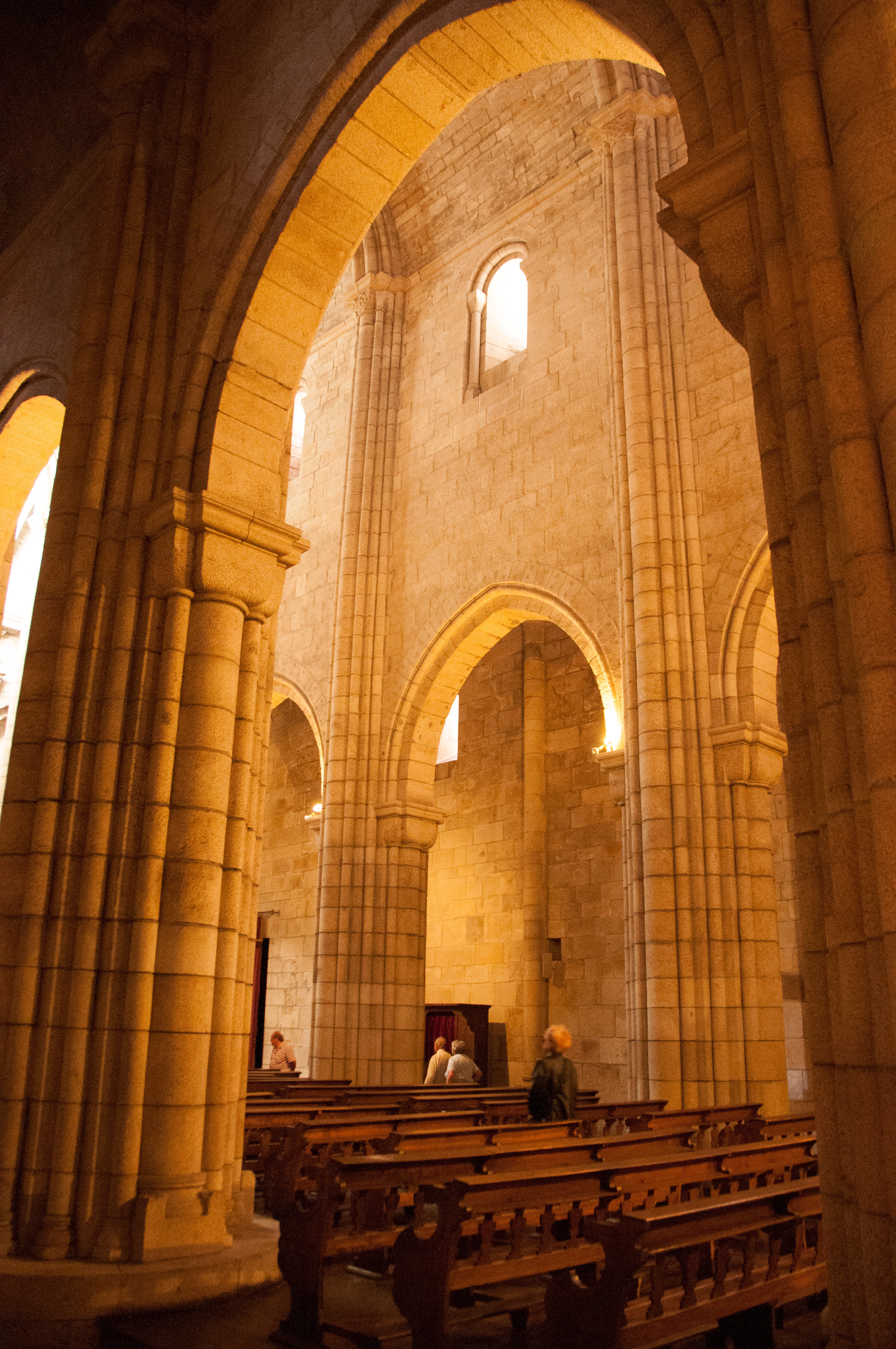
Very few and narrow openings giving it a grim environment, typical of Romanesque style

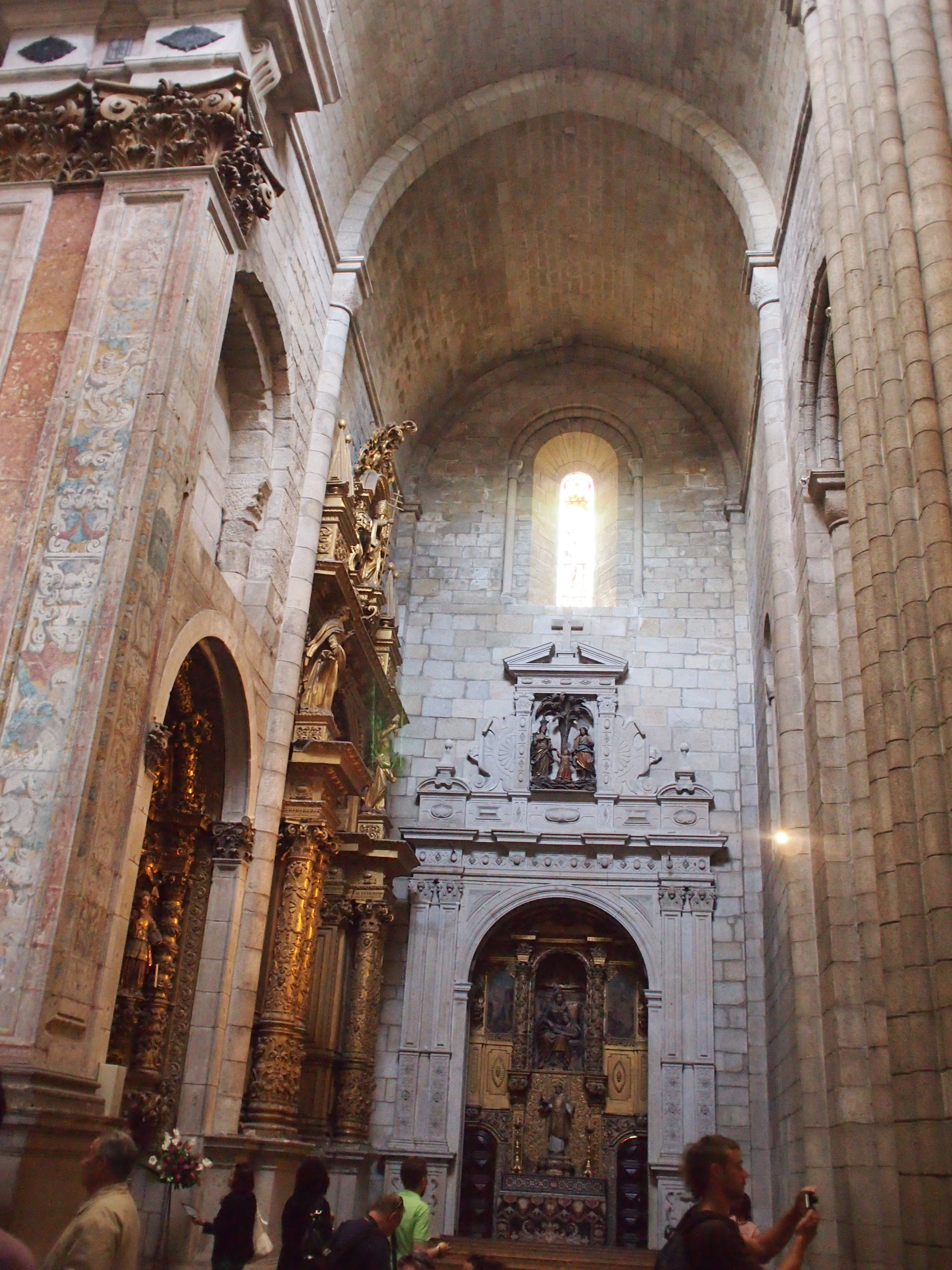
View of the transept

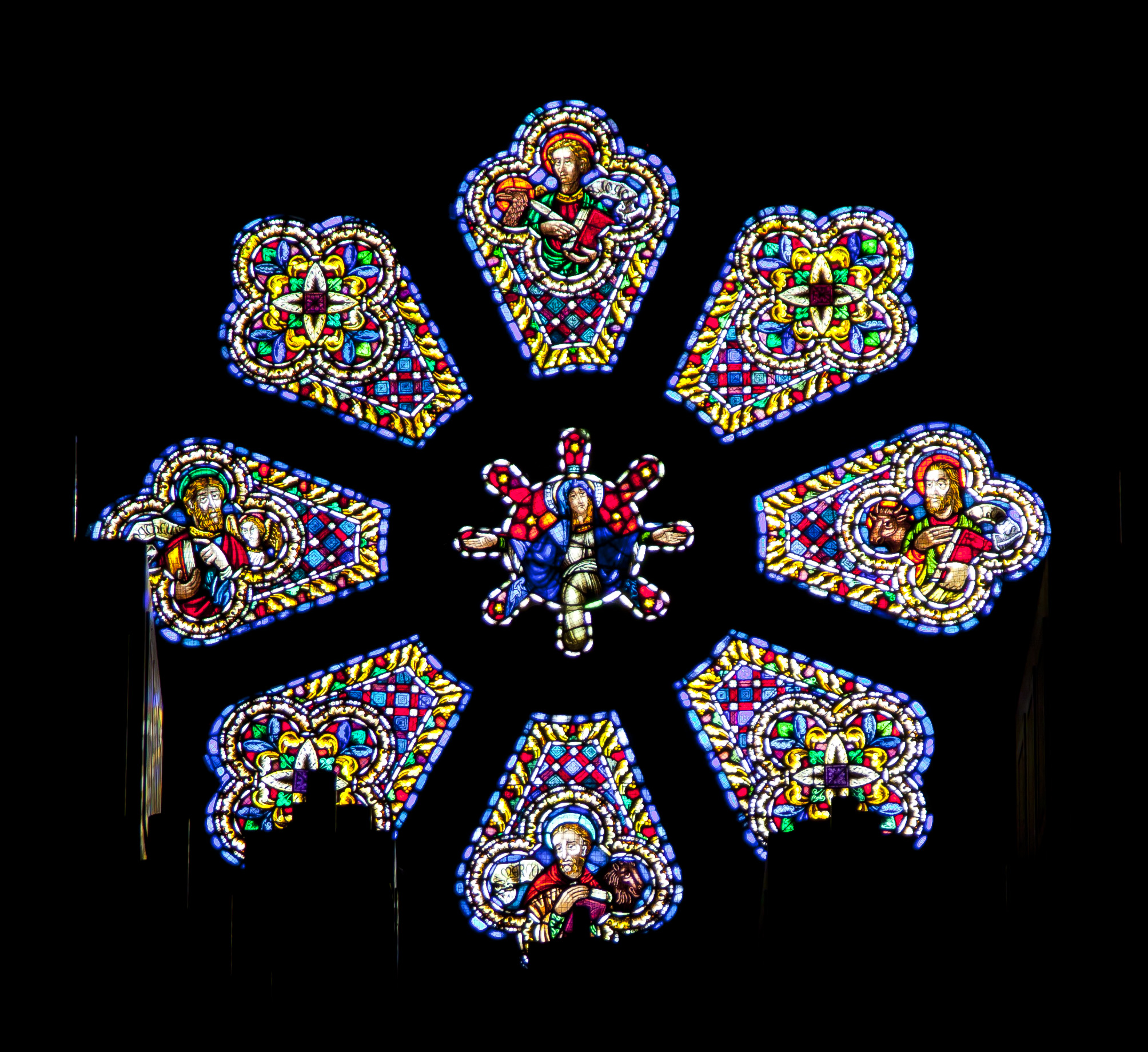
Stained glass window representing the Virgin Mary and various saints

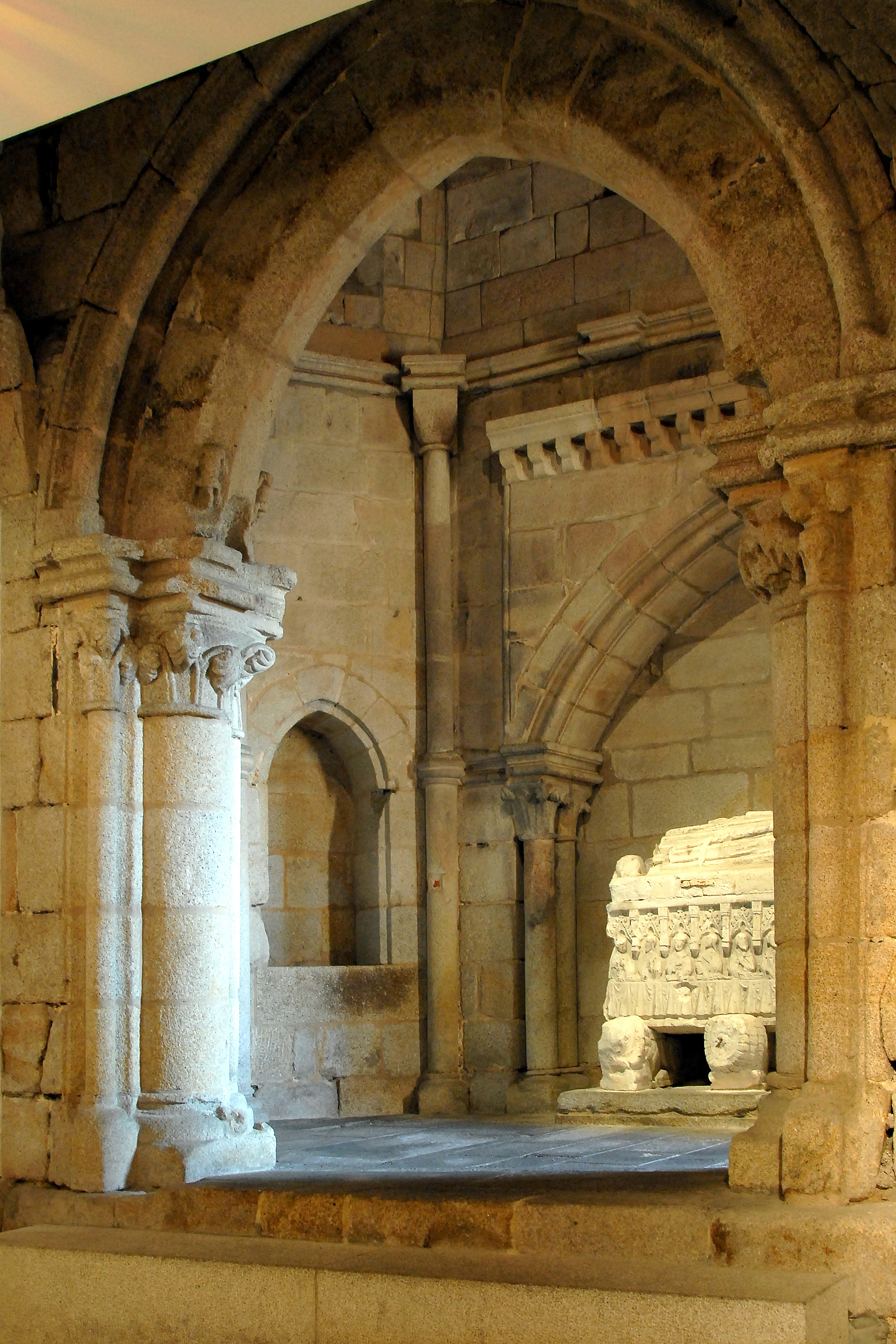
Chapel of St. John the Evangelist

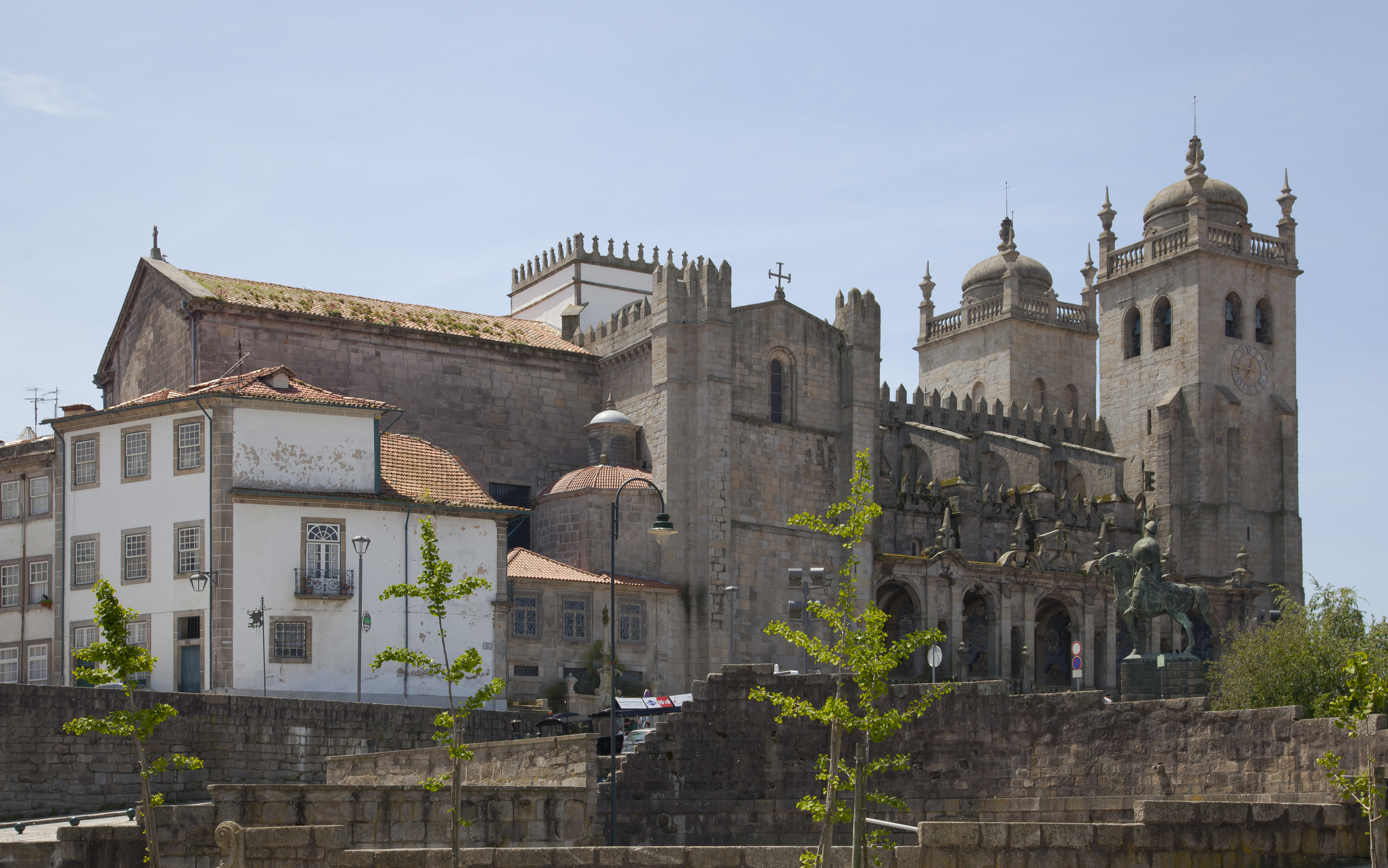
Exterior view of the cathedral showing its imposing towers, very large apse and short transept

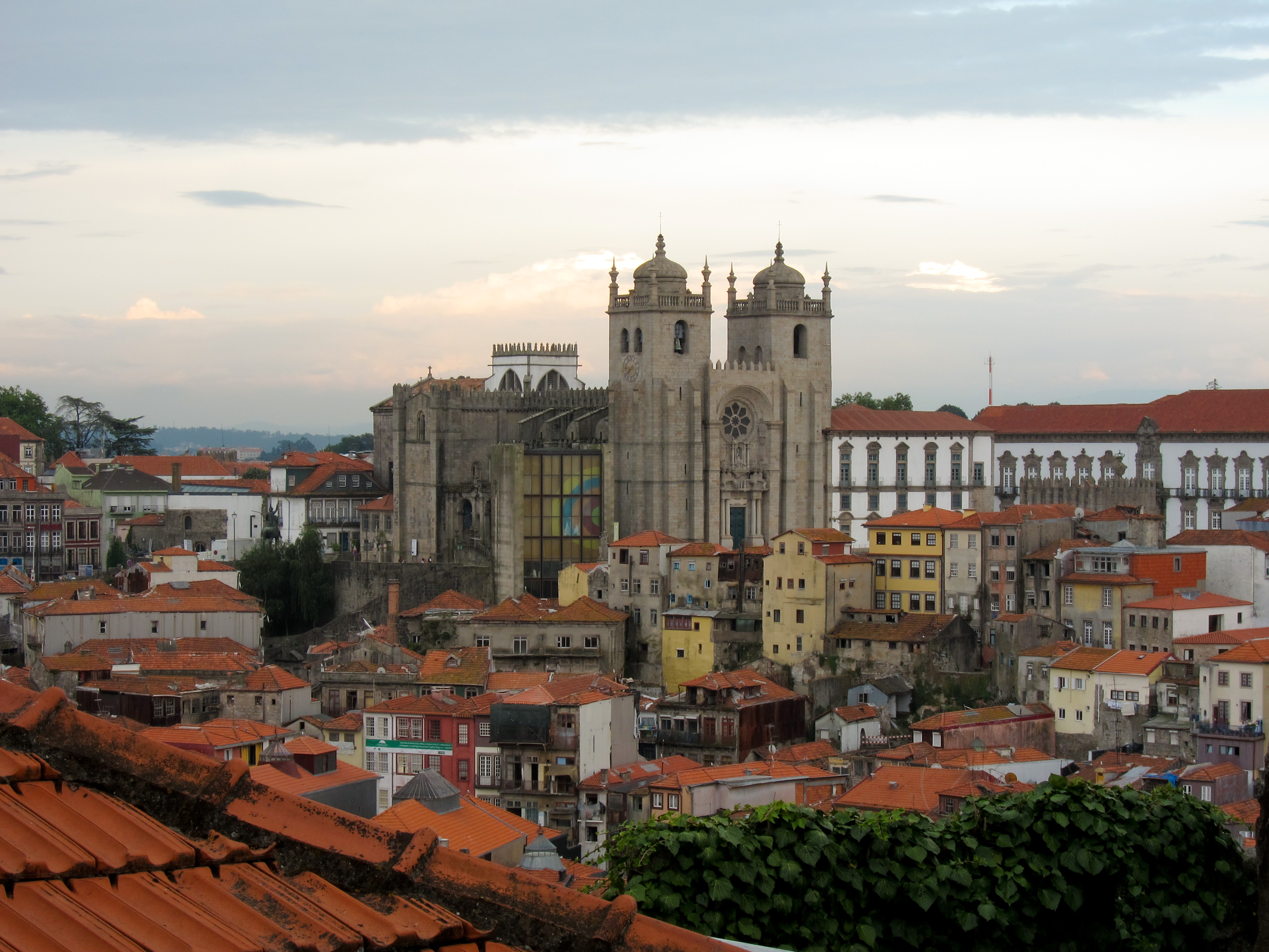
View from the city center

=== Viseu Cathedral ===
Viseu Cathedral started being built in the 12th century and is the most important historical monument of the city. It is currently a mix of architectural styles, specially from the Manueline, Renaissance and Mannerist periods.

The current cathedral building started being erected in the mid-12th century, but little remains from this early Romanesque building except for some architectural details. The church was greatly enlarged in the following centuries of the Middle Ages, assuming its present configuration as a three-aisled building with three Eastern chapels. Some Gothic chapels in the cloisters also date from this period.

Built has a three-aisled nave, transept and three Eastern chapels. The main façade is flanked by two towers. The outer, lateral walls of the church have a heavy, menacing appearance, typical of Portuguese medieval cathedrals, being partially decorated with merlons. The South (clock) tower is still of medieval origin, while the North tower had to be rebuilt in the 17th century after a storm. The storm also destroyed the Manueline façade, which was rebuilt around 1635. The three-storey façade resembles a Mannerist altarpiece and is decorated with niches harbouring statues of the Four Evangelists, as well as the Holy Mary and Saint Theotonius.

Details of Viseu Cathedral

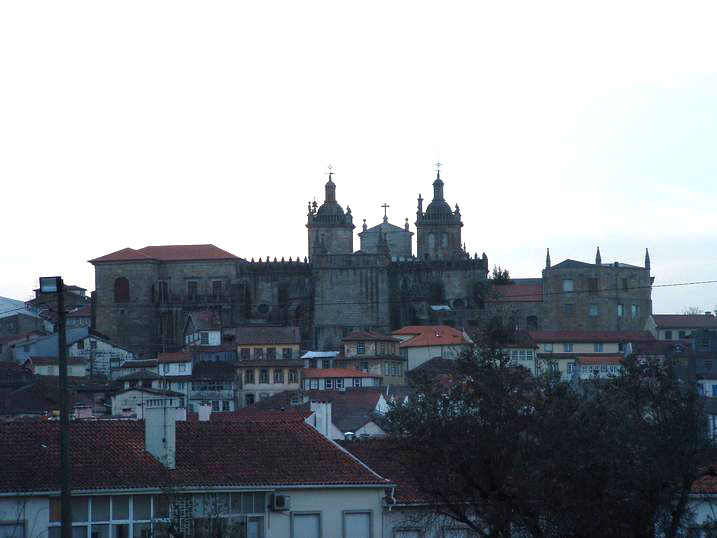
Exterior view of the cathedral with its bishopric dependencies and fortified look.

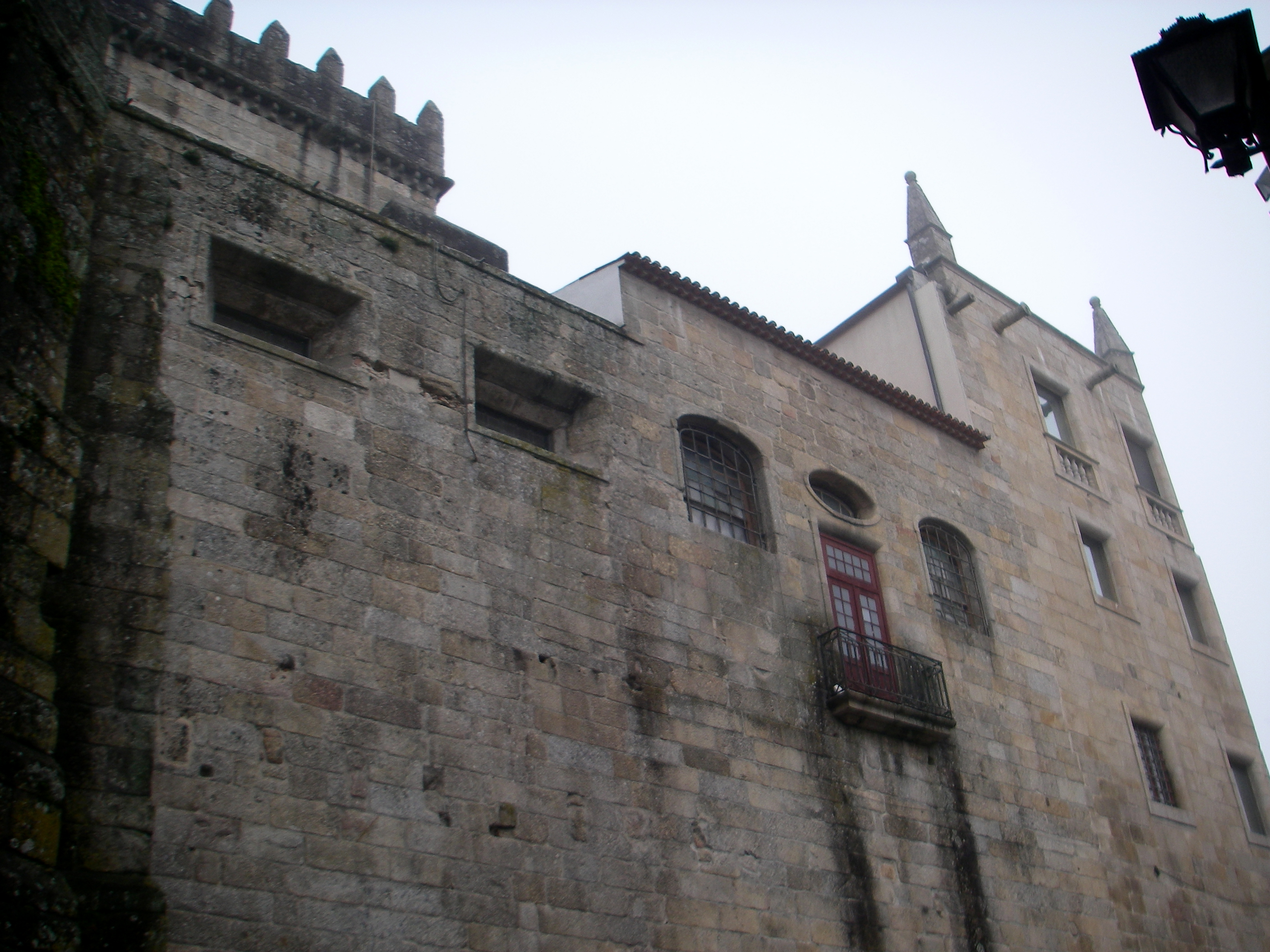
Walls covering the back side of the cathedral.

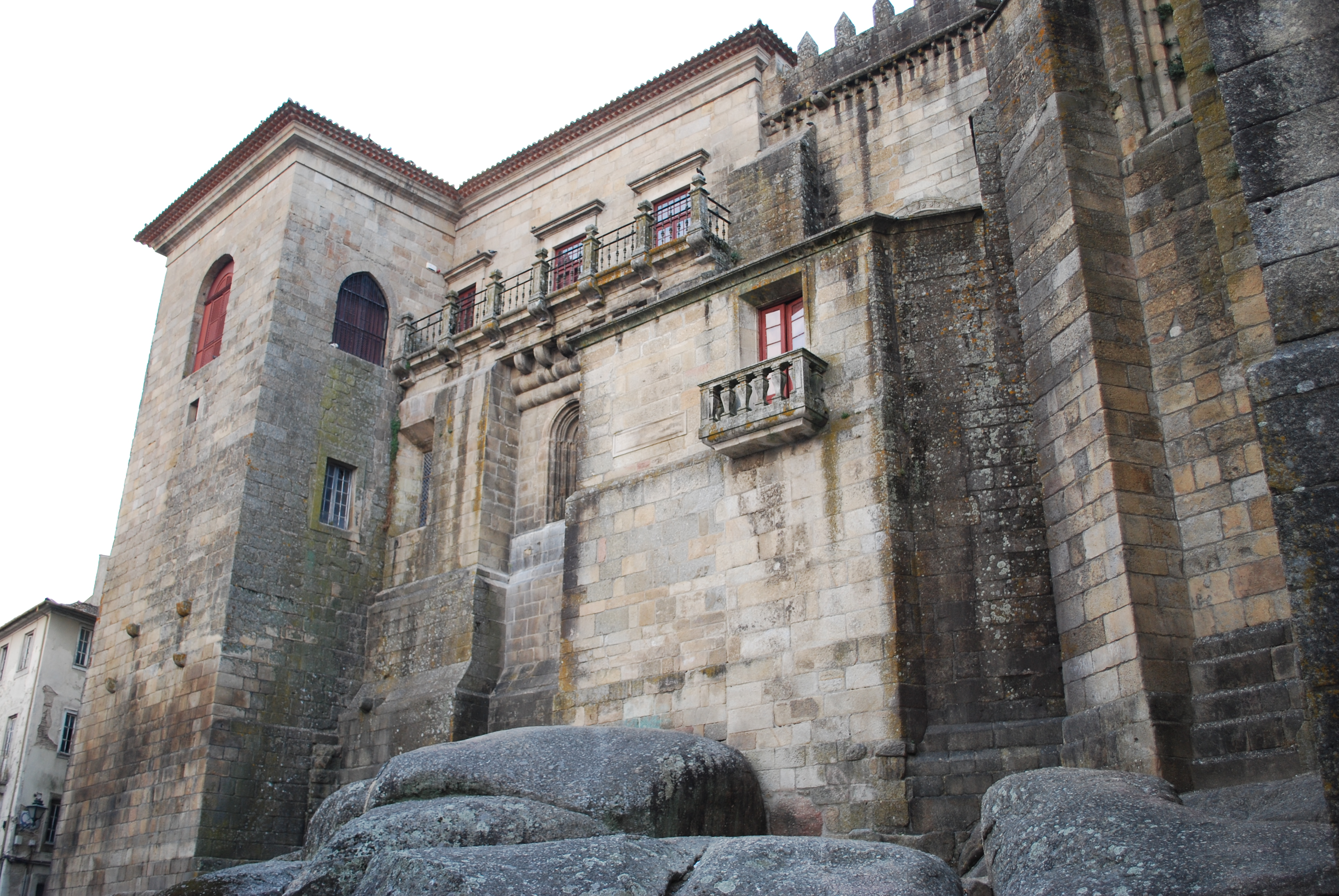
The bishopric dependencies and its castle-like features with towers and austere walls.

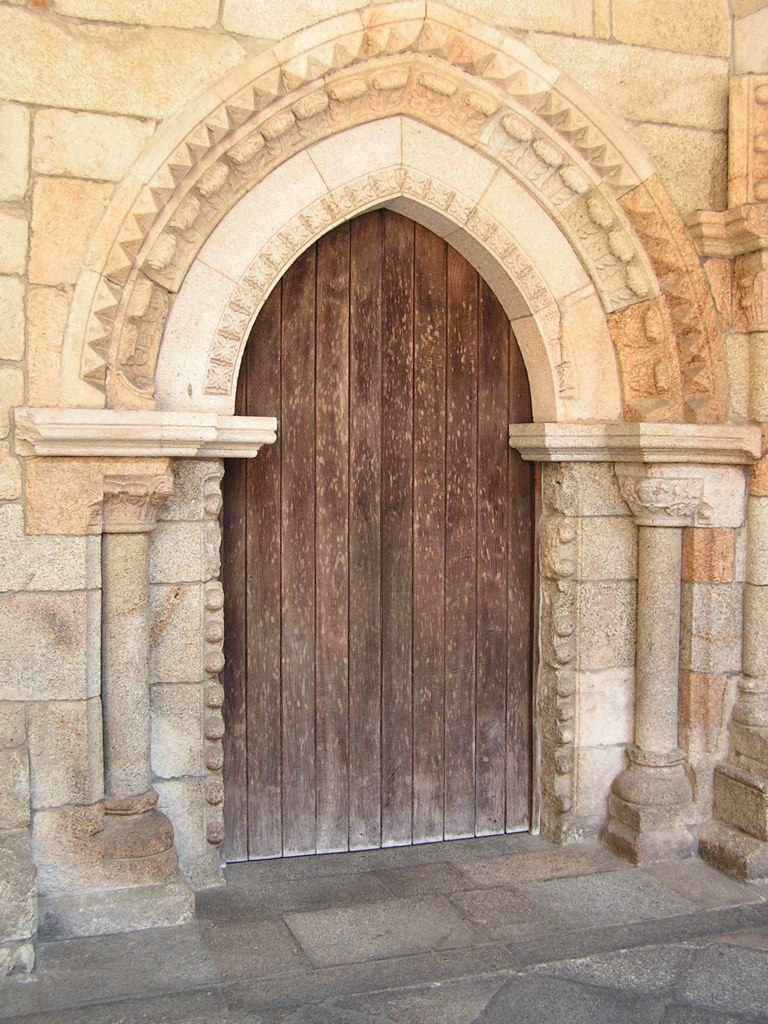
Cloister's entrance door, with a proto-Gothic pointed arch but still from the Romanesque period.

=== Coimbra Cathedral ===
The Old Cathedral of Coimbra (Portuguese: Sé Velha de Coimbra) was built some time after the Battle of Ourique in 1139. The project of this Romanesque cathedral is attributed to Master Robert, a, possibly, French architect who was directing the building of Lisbon Cathedral at that time and visited Coimbra regularly. The works were supervised by Master Bernard, possibly also French, who was succeeded by Master Soeiro, an architect active in other churches around the Diocese of Porto.

From the outside, Coimbra's old cathedral looks like a fortress, with its high, crenellated walls harbouring few, narrow windows. This menacing appearance is explained by the belligerent times in which it was built. There is a tower-like structure in the middle of the western façade with a portal and a similar-looking upper window. Both portal and window are heavily decorated with Romanesque motifs of Mozarabic and Pre-Romanesque influences. The façade is reinforced by thick buttresses at the corners that compensate for the angle of the terrain (the cathedral was built on the slope of a hill). The interior of the cathedral has a nave with two aisles, a small transept, and an eastern apse with three chapels. The nave is covered by barrel vaulting and the lateral aisles by groin vaults. The nave has an upper storey, a spacious triforium (arched gallery), that could accommodate more mass attendants in the tribunes if needed. All columns of the interior have decorated capitals, mainly with vegetable motifs, but also with animals and geometric patterns. The windows of the lantern-tower and the big window in the west facade are the main sources of natural light of the cathedral.

The cloister, built during the reign of Afonso II (early 13th century), is a work of the transition between Romanesque and Gothic. Each of the Gothic pointed arches that face the courtyard encompass two twin round arches in Romanesque style.

Details of Coimbra Cathedral

Barrel vaulted nave with a high placed arched gallery.

Coimbra is the only big cathedral in Portugal that still has the original Romanesque semi-circular apse.

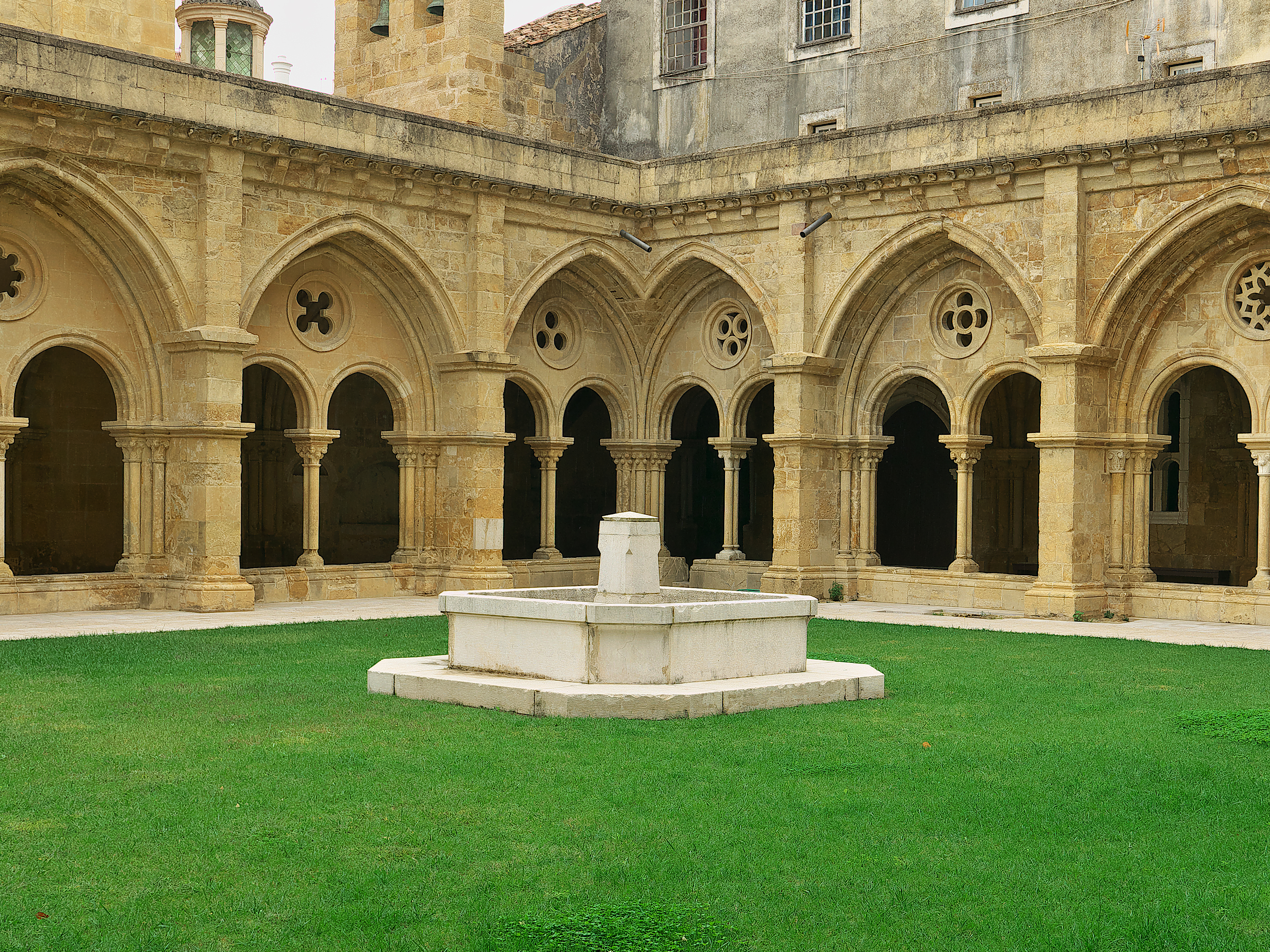
The cloisters were already built in a transition between Romanesque and Gothic, as noticeable in the pointed arches.

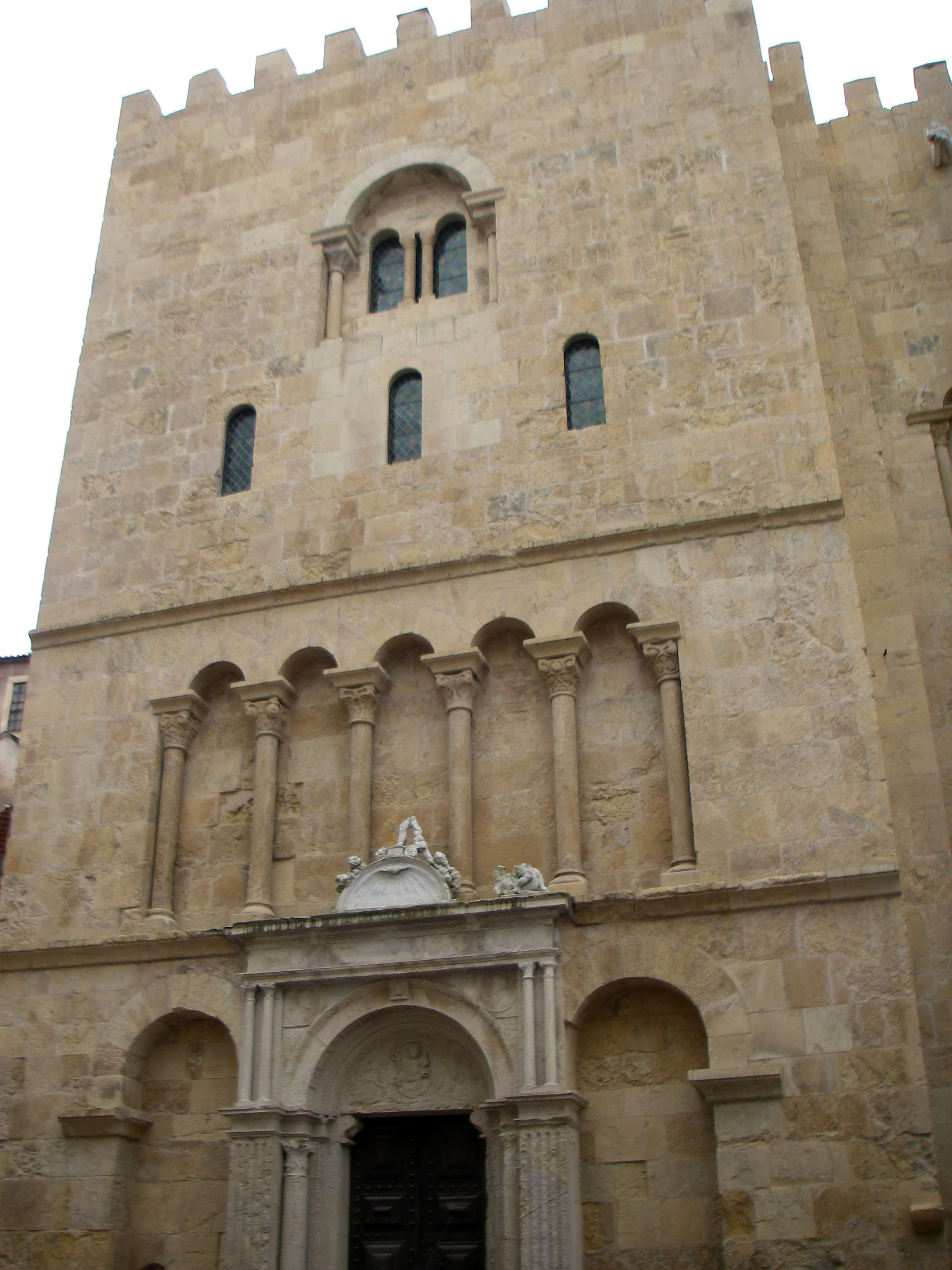
Its northern facade with narrow windows and columns.

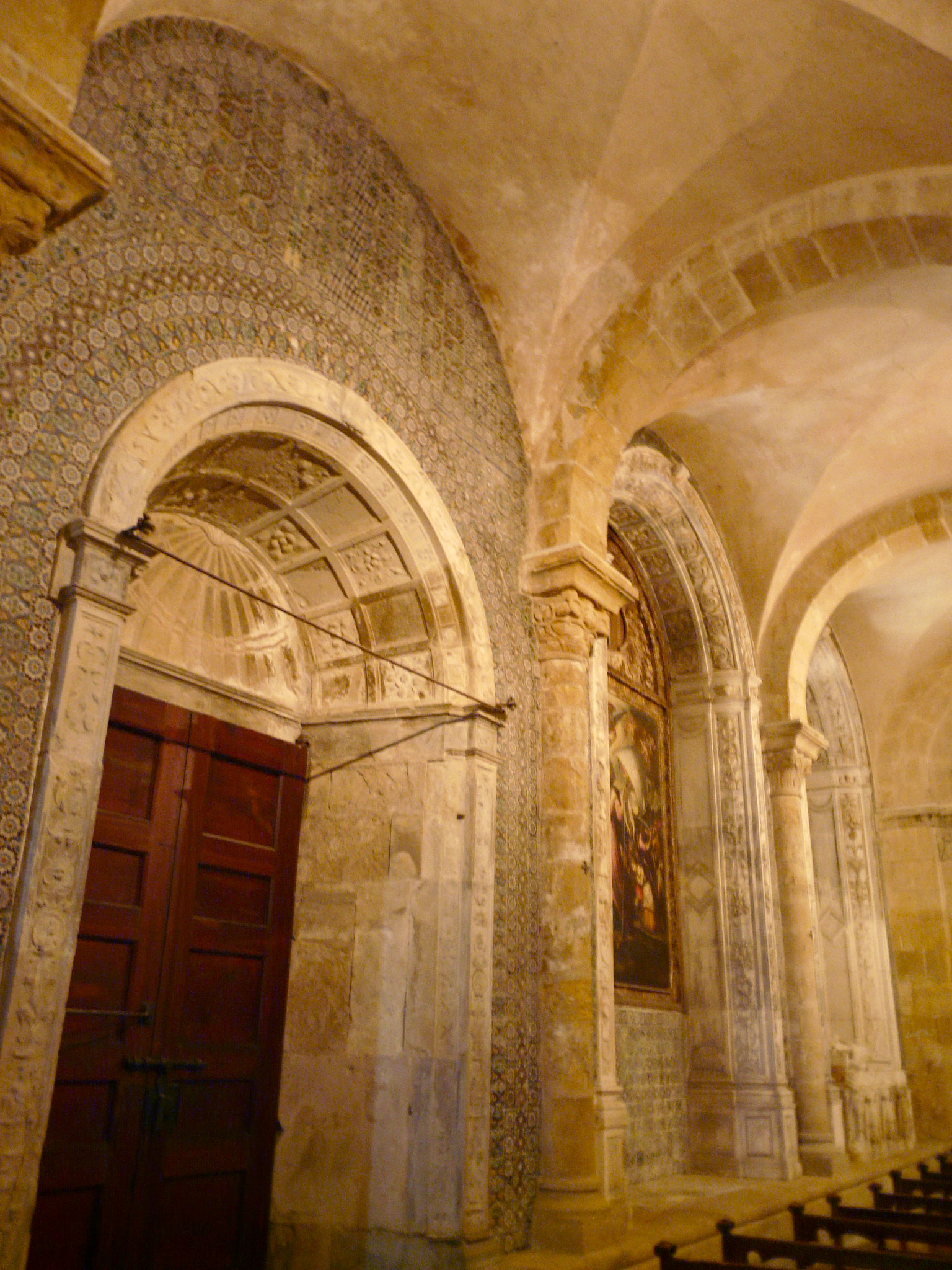
Lateral aisles supported by groin vaulting and walls decorated with 16th-century Mudéjar tiles.

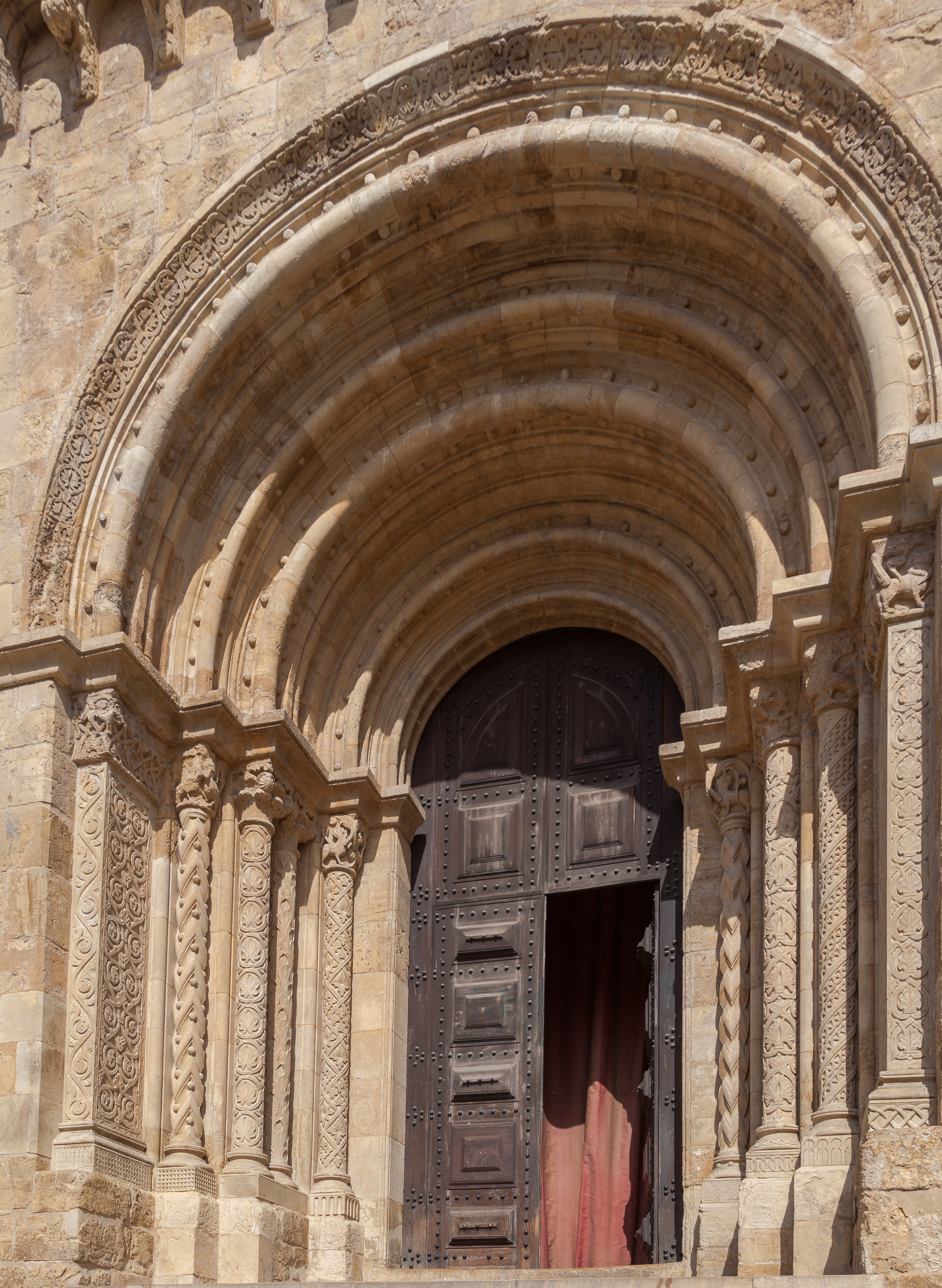
Detail of the main door with its intricate carved columns and arches and a corbel row separating the front window.

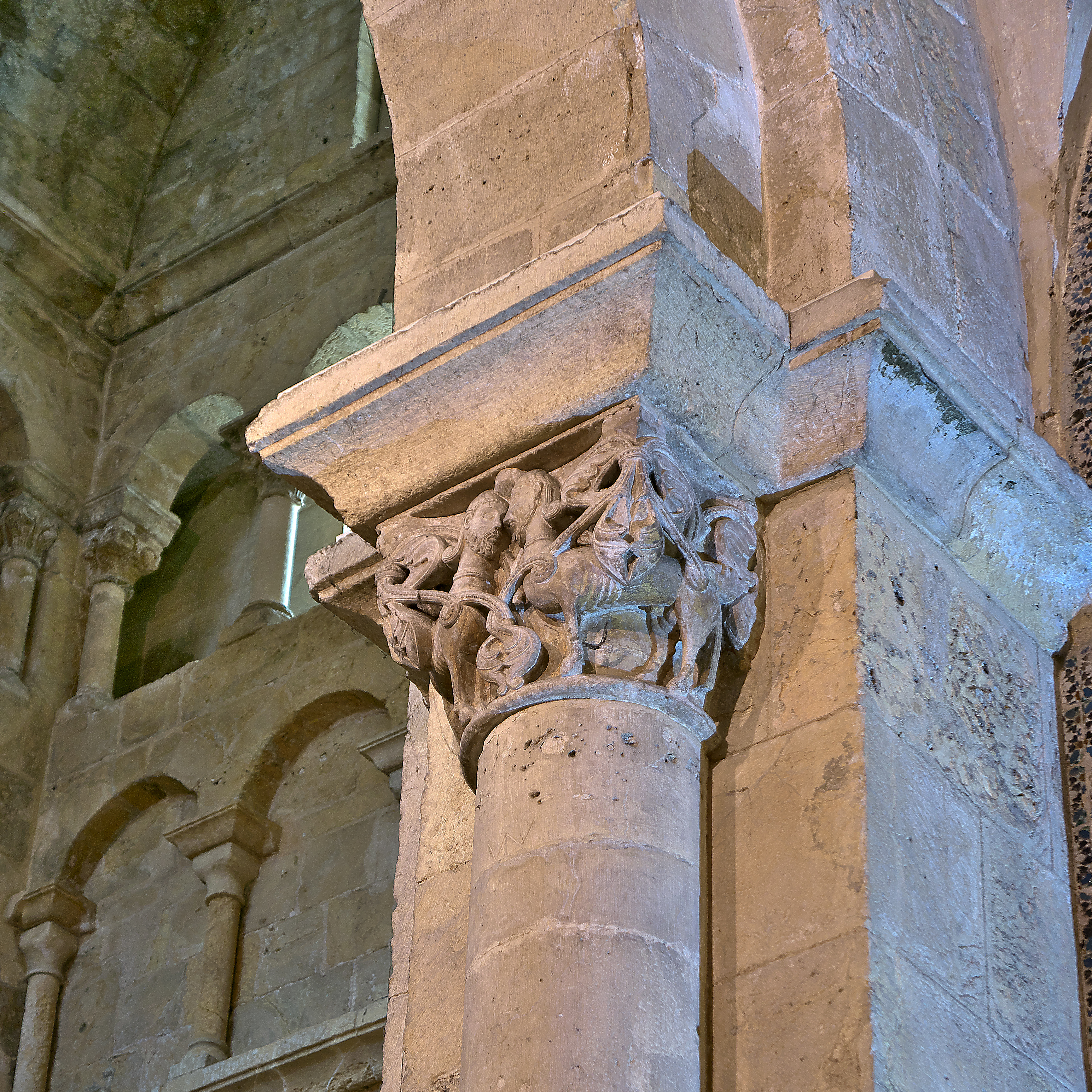
Corinthian capital decorated with anthropomorphic figures.

Coimbra Cathedral, with crenellated tops and heavy buttresses giving it a castle like appearance.

=== Lisbon Cathedral ===
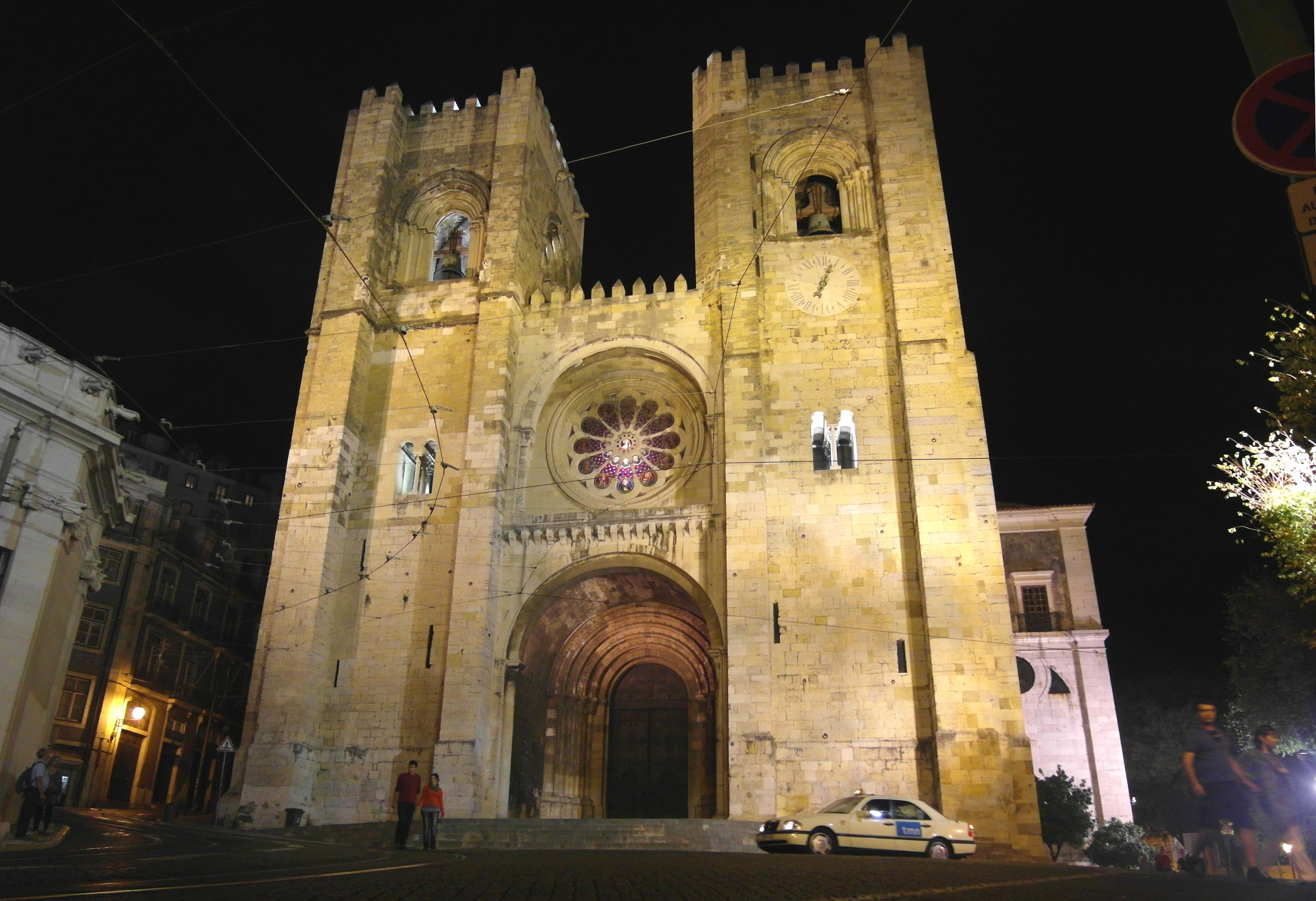
Lisbon Cathedral, severely damaged after the earthquake of 1755, it was rebuilt following the same original 12th-century plan.

The Patriarchal Cathedral of St. Mary Major (Portuguese: Santa Maria Maior de Lisboa or Sé de Lisboa) or simply Lisbon Cathedral is the oldest church in the city and the see of Archdiocese of Lisbon.

This first building was completed between 1147 and the first decades of the 13th century in Late Romanesque style. At that time the relics of St. Vincent of Saragossa, patron saint of Lisbon, were brought to the cathedral from Southern Portugal. This cathedral follows a Latin cross plan with three aisles, a transept and a main chapel surrounded by a Gothic ambulatory. The church is connected with a cloister on the Eastern side. The main façade of the cathedral looks like a fortress, with two towers flanking the entrance and crenellations over the walls. This menacing appearance, also seen in other Portuguese cathedrals of the time, is a relic from the Reconquista period, when the cathedral could be used as a base to attack the enemy during a siege.

From its first building period from 1147 until the first decades of the 13th century, Lisbon cathedral has preserved the West façade with a rose window (rebuilt from fragments in the 20th century), the main portal, the North lateral portal and the nave of the cathedral. The portals have interesting sculptured capitals with Romanesque motifs. The nave is covered by barrel vaulting and has an upper, arched gallery (triforium). Light gets in through the rose windows of the West façade and transept, the narrow windows of the lateral aisles of the nave as well as the windows of the lantern tower of the transept. The general plan of the cathedral is very similar to that of the Cathedral of Coimbra, which dates from the same period. One of the chapels of the ambulatory has an interesting Romanesque iron gate.

Details of Lisbon Cathedral

The nave is covered by barrel vaulting and has an upper, arched gallery (triforium)

The cathedral's columns and arches supporting the barrel vault

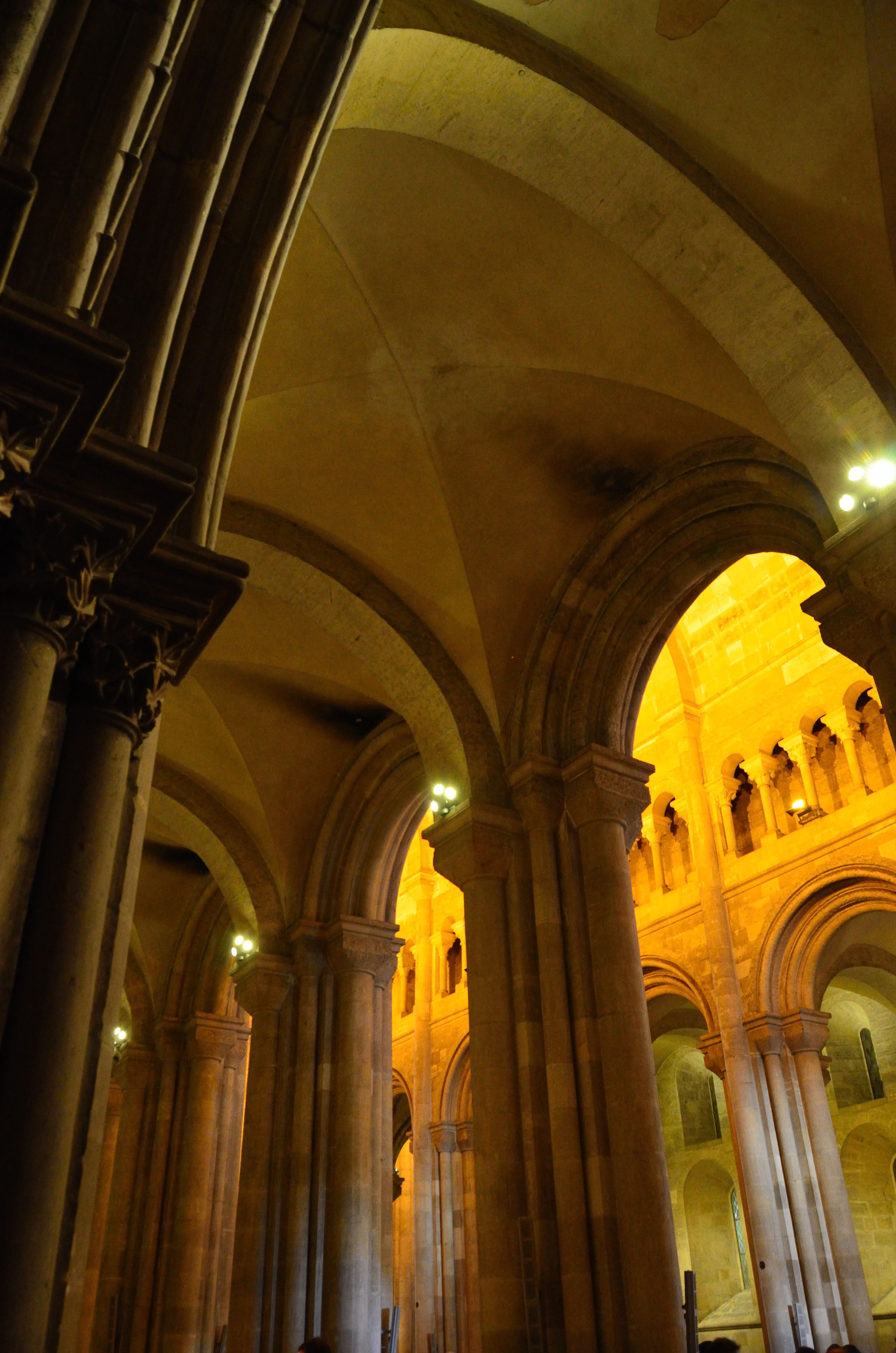
Lateral aisles covered by groin vaults.

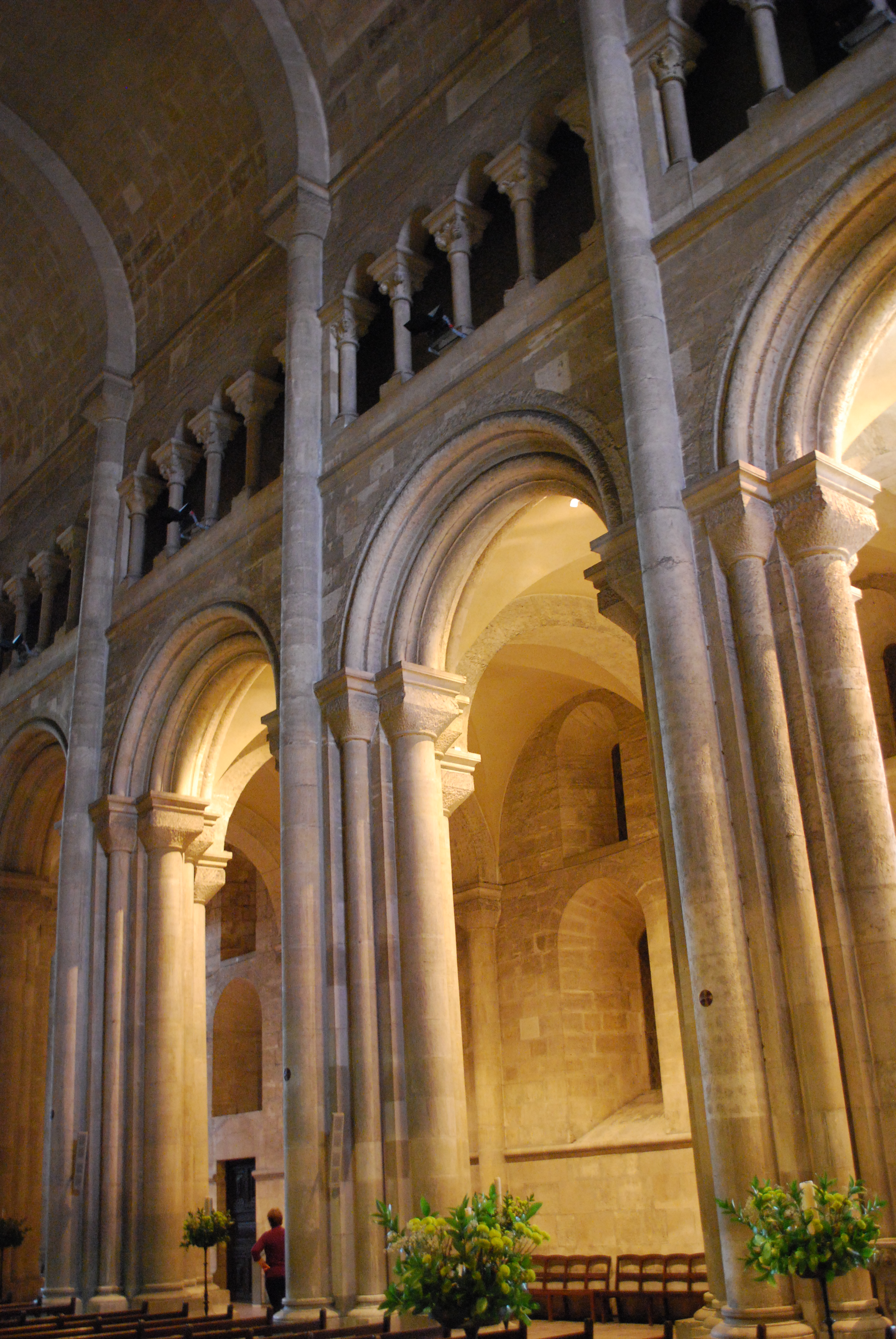
Pillars and arches of the nave.

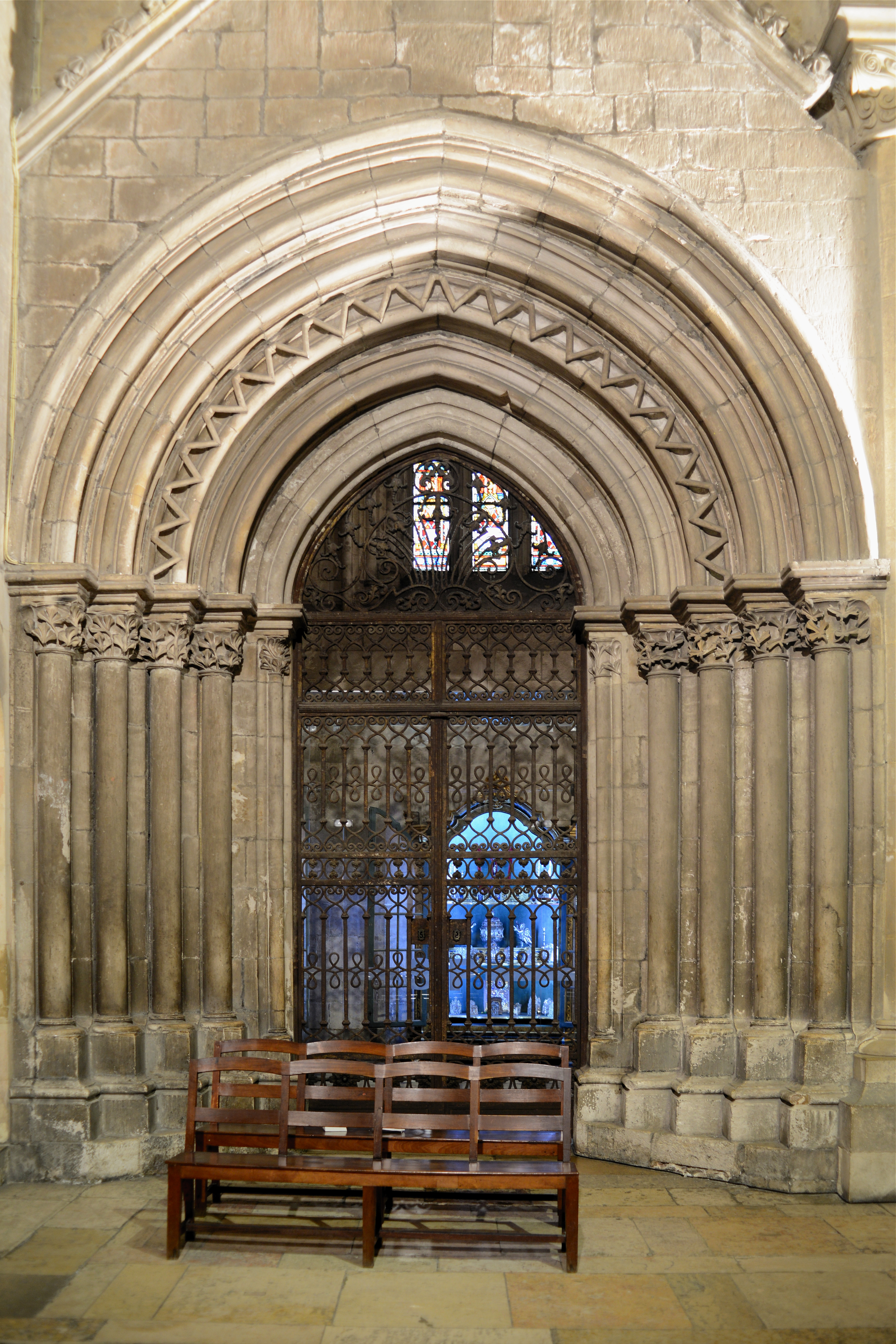
Romanesque door and iron gate leading to the ambulatory.

Rose window representing Jesus and His disciples

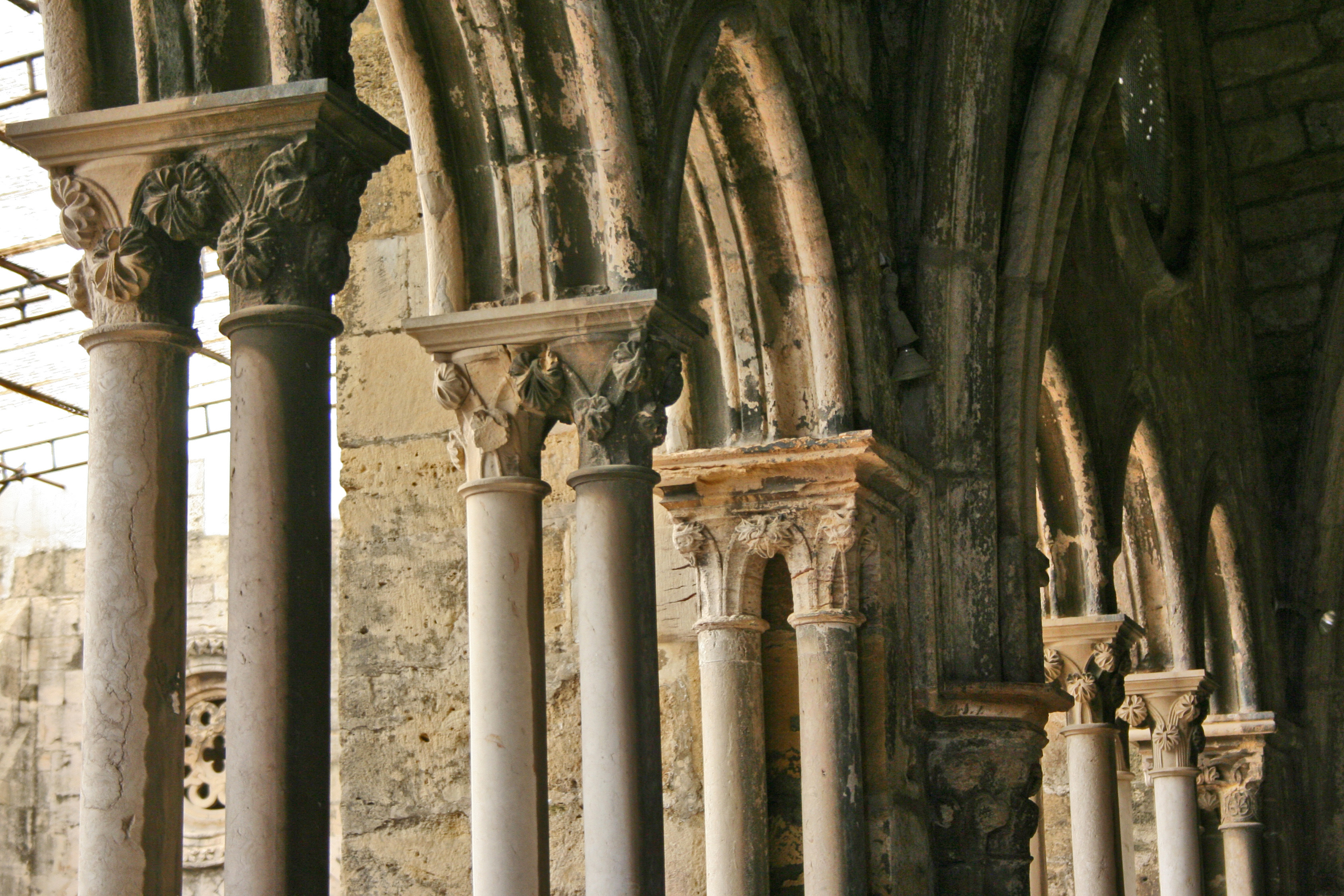
Detail of the cloister's columns and capitals.

The facade of Lisbon Cathedral has two bell towers in the Norman manner and a wheel window

== Knights Templar round church (Charola/Rotunda) at Convent of Christ ==
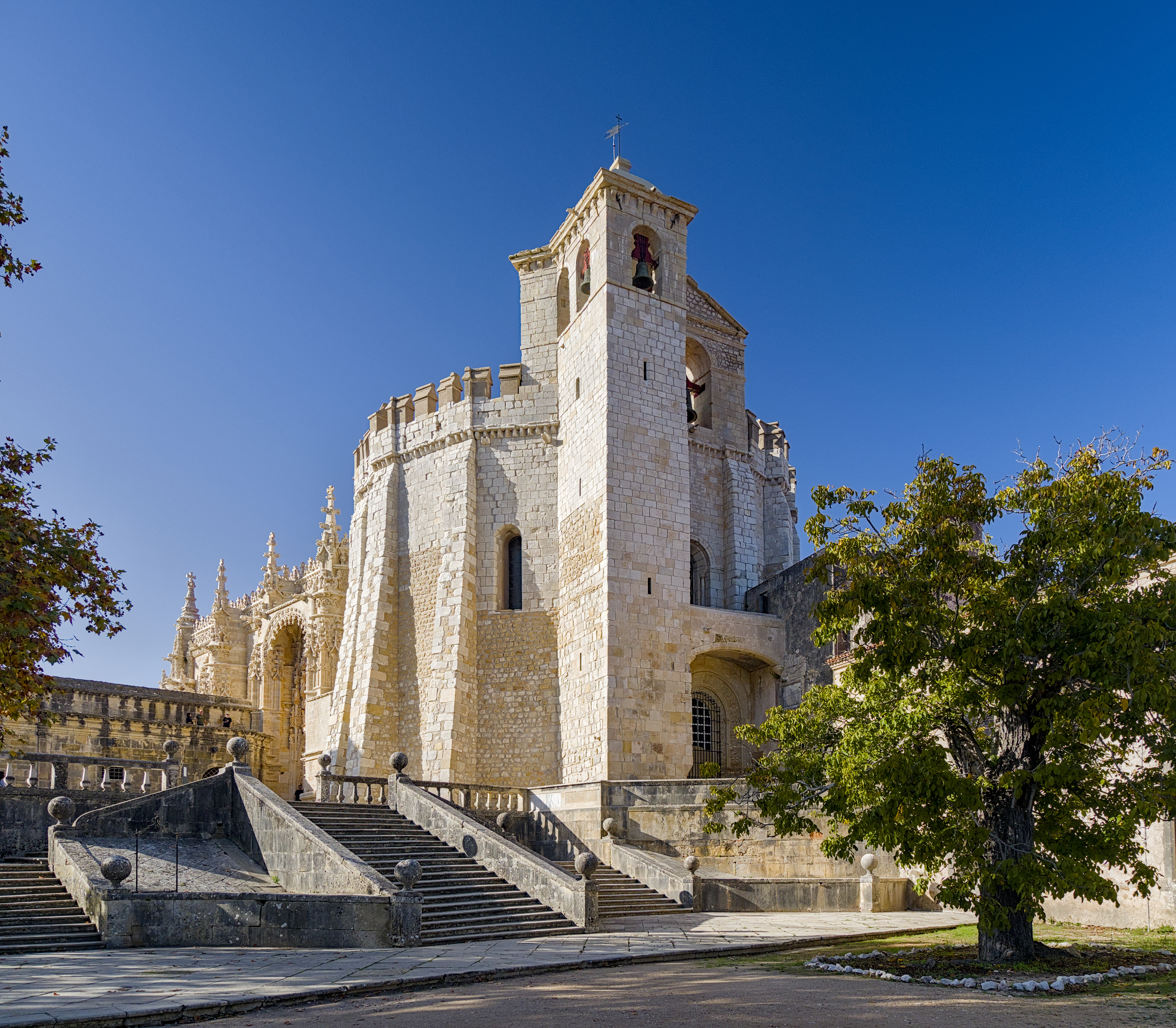
The round church of the Knights Templar in Tomar was built to be a fortified chapel, serving both for praying and defense.

Originally a 12th-century Templar stronghold, when the order was dissolved in the 14th century the Portuguese branch was turned into the Knights of the Order of Christ, that later supported Portugal's maritime discoveries of the 15th century. The Convent and Castle complex in Tomar is a historic and cultural monument which was listed in the list of UNESCO World Heritage list in 1983.

The convent was founded by the Order of Poor Knights of the Temple (or Templar Knights) in 1160. Its construction continued until the final part of the 12th century with the construction of the Charola (oratory), in one of the angles of the castle, completed by the Grand Master Gualdim Pais sometime around 1180.

=== Templar Church ===
The Romanesque round church (charola, rotunda) was built in the second half of the 12th century by the Knights Templar, as a 16-side polygonal structure, with strong buttresses, round windows and a bell-tower. Inside, the round church has a central, octagonal structure, connected by arches to a surrounding gallery (ambulatory). The general shape of the church is modelled after similar round structures in Jerusalem: the Mosque of Omar and the Church of the Holy Sepulchre.

The capitals of the columns are still Romanesque (end of the 12th century) and depict vegetal and animal motifs, as well as a Daniel in the Lions' Den scene. The style of the capitals shows the influence of artists working on the Cathedral of Coimbra, which was being built at the same time as the round church.

The interior of the round church is magnificently decorated with late Gothic/Manueline sculptures and paintings, added during a renovation sponsored by King Manuel I starting in 1499. The pillars of the central octagon and the walls of the ambulatory have polychrome statues of saints and angels under exuberant Gothic canopies, while the walls and ceilings of the ambulatory are painted with Gothic patterns and panels depicting the life of Christ. The paintings are attributed to the workshop of the court painter of Manuel I, the Portuguese Jorge Afonso, while the sculptured decoration is attributed to Flemish sculptor Olivier of Gand and the Spaniard Hernán Muñoz. A magnificent panel depicting the martyrdom of Saint Sebastian, by Portuguese painter Gregório Lopes, was painted for the Round Church and now hangs in the National Museum of Ancient Art in Lisbon.

Details of Convent of Christ

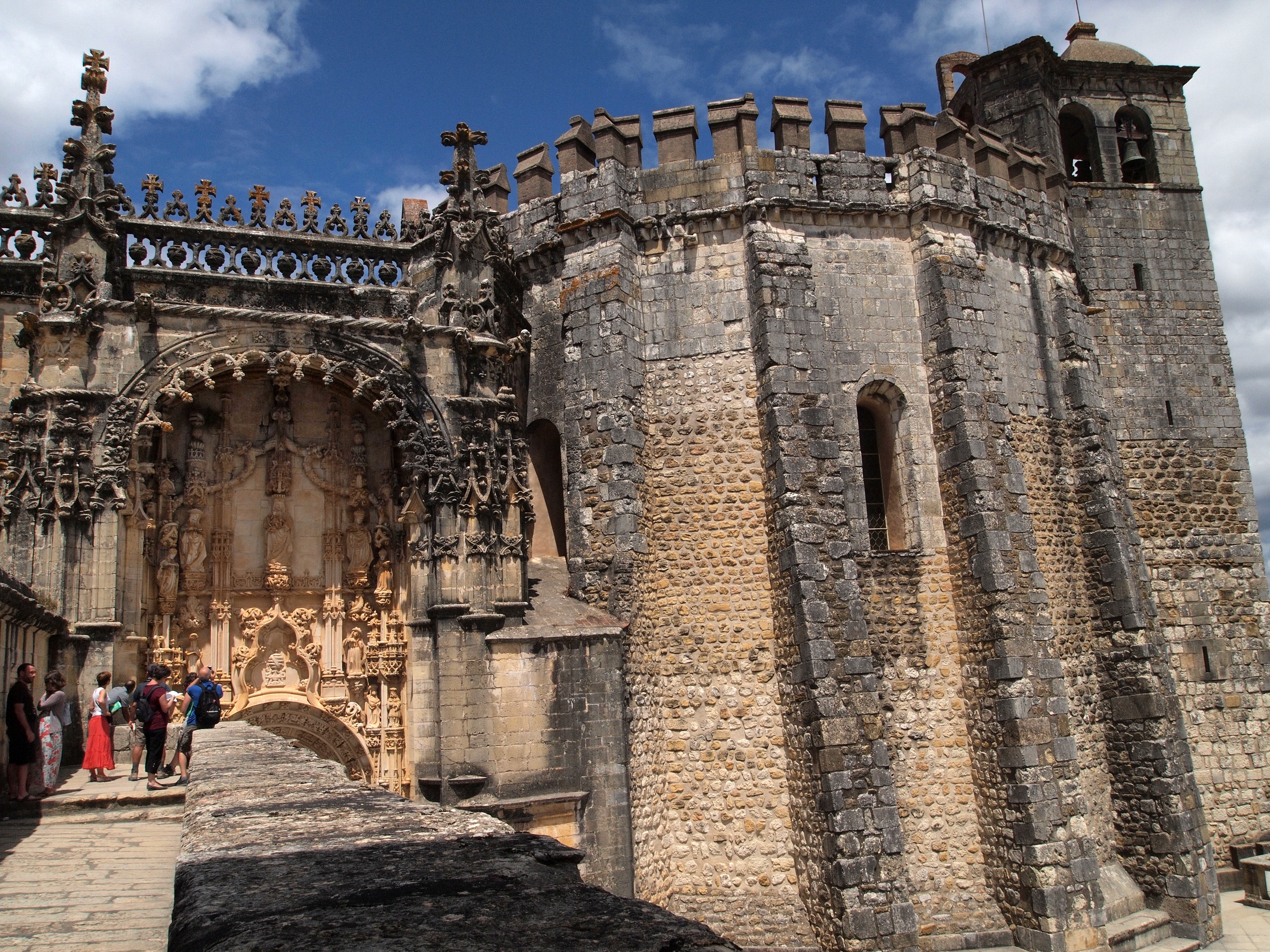
The 12th-century Romanesque Charola (round-church) on the right compared with the 16th-century Manueline church on the left.

Entrance of the Charola, with its mural paintings.

The octagonal structure replicates the Holy Land architecture, specially the Old Temple of Solomon.

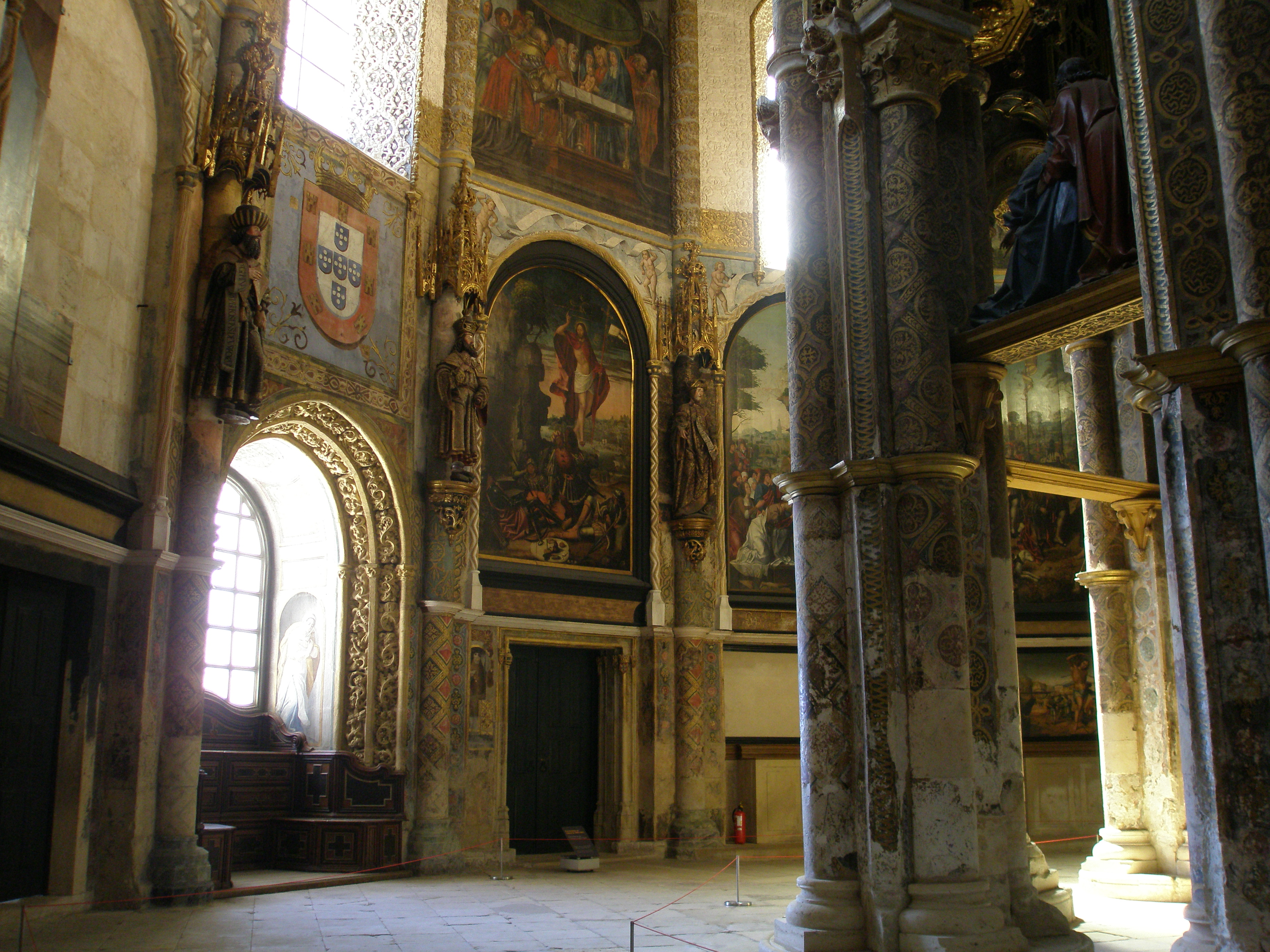
Church ambulatory with Renaissance paintings.

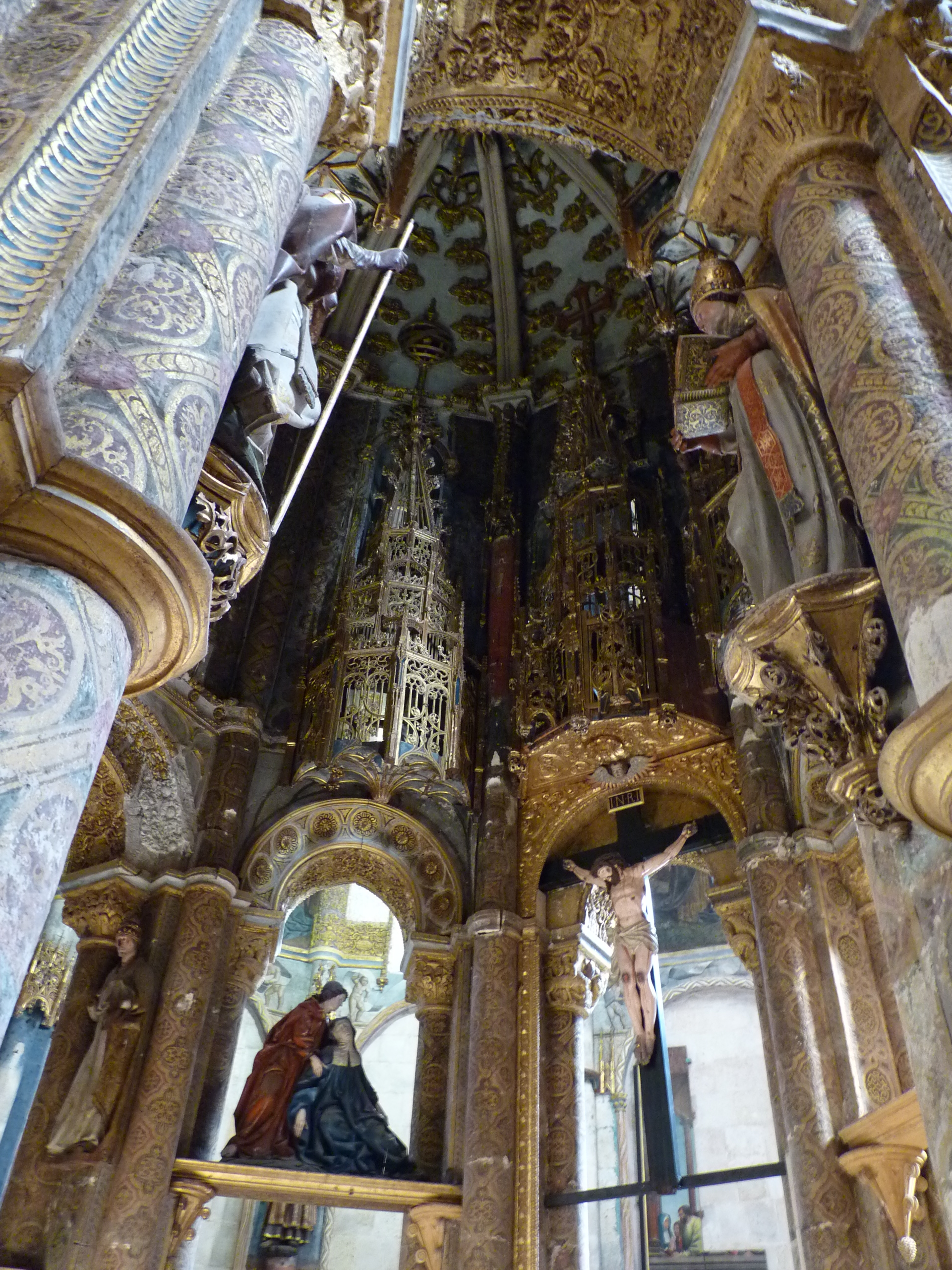
Inside the structure we find Gothic altar pieces and sculptures to portrait Christ's ascension to Heaven.

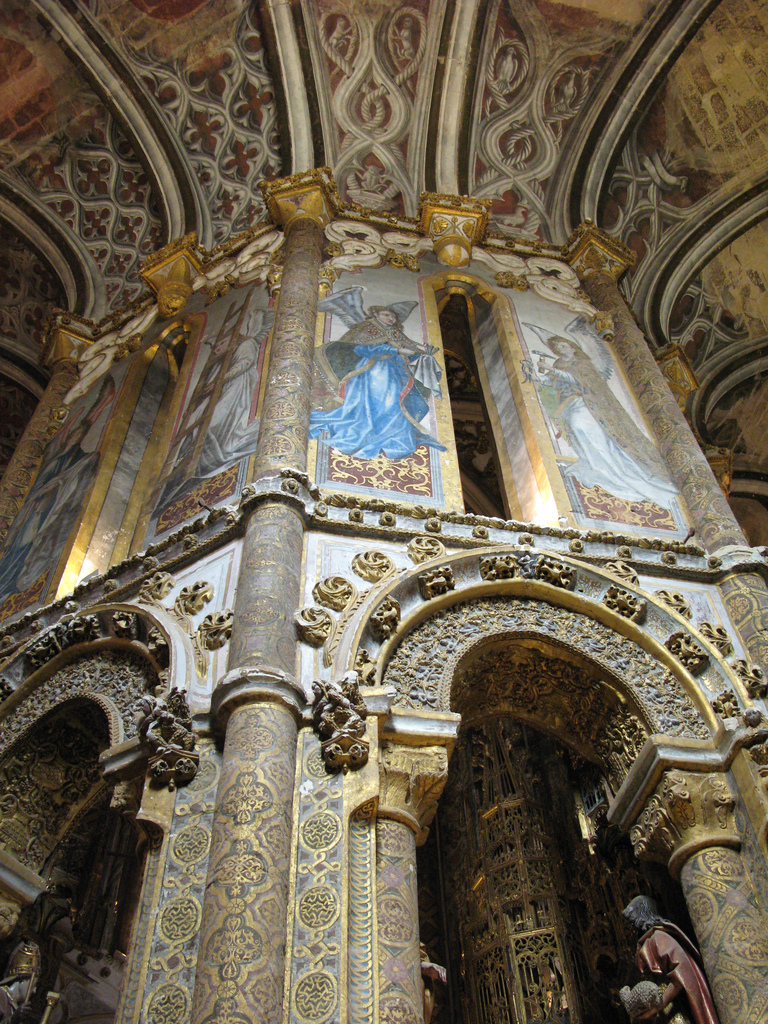
Details of the columns and arches. In the Middle Ages the structure had no decorations, paintings and golden leaves were added in the 16th century during Manueline style.

== Churches and monasteries ==
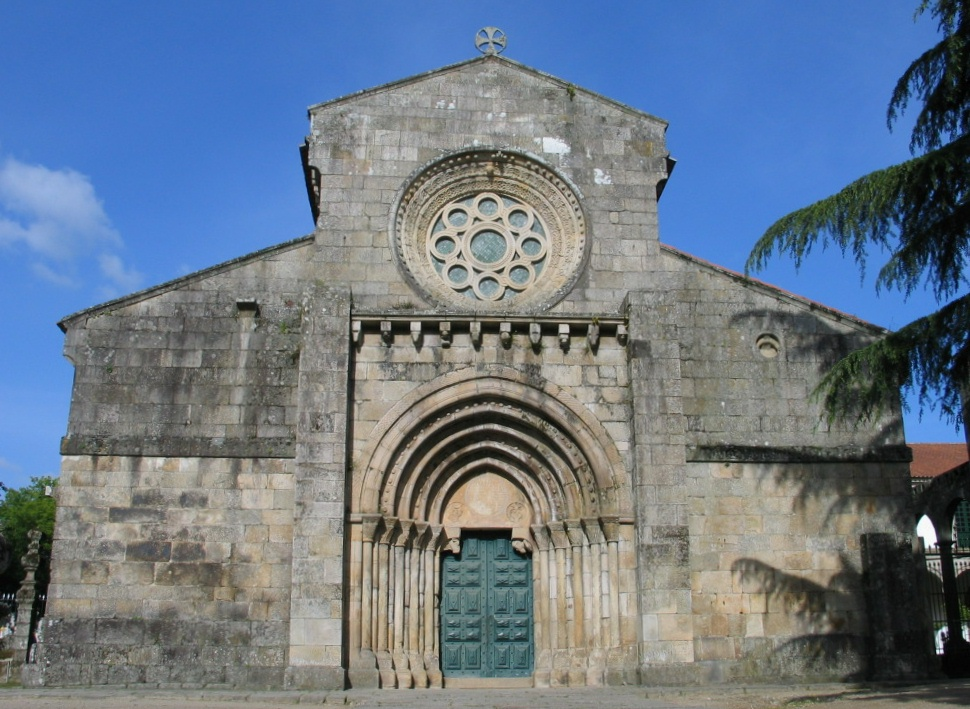
Monastery of Paço de Sousa, built in the 10th century by the Benedictine monks.

As previously stated, Romanesque architecture style reached Portugal by the end of the 11th century by the hand of Cluniac, Cistercian and Augustinian orders, bringing with them the monastical reforms that were already underway in their countries of origin. Their influence and importance on the spreading of this new art form can be asserted by the large number of churches and monasteries, one of the kind of Romanesque buildings that survived until our days.

The introduction of this new style coincided with the advance of the Reconquista to the south and the development of recent Portuguese independence and its territorial changes, reflecting this war paradigm and the need for defense profoundly engraved in the specific kind of Romanesque art found in Portugal: crenelated walls, towers, use of battlements, merlons, narrow slits and decorative austerity, like the church of Travanca Monastery with its heavy tower, the Monastery of Cete, the Church of Airães, São Martinho de Mouros, Paço de Sousa Monastery and the Monastery of Rates, one of the most artistically diverse. Almost every religious building has a fortress-like design because in the absence of castles, churches were always considered the best fortresses.

Therefore, it is not surprising that monastical buildings comprise most of the Romanesque kind, specially in the northern areas of Entre-Douro-e-Minho, Tâmega and Sousa valleys and along the Douro river margins. With a significant rural population dispersed within these regions and organized in villages or concelhos we also find a significant number of parish churches, like São Gens de Boelhe, São Vicente de Sousa, São Pedro de Ferreira or Santa Maria de Cárquere Being very simple and small constructions. Each of them have an iconographic variety of decorative features, being another unique "indigenous" characteristic of Portuguese Romanesque.

Portuguese Romanesque churches have a longitudinal structure, following the basilical plan common throughout Europe: three aisles, transept and apse with two apsidoles, either semi-circular or square shaped, or just with one single aisle and apse. With semi-circular apse and apsidoles we have the churches of Ganfei, Rates, Pombeiro, São Tiago of Coimbra and Castro de Avelãs. The churches of São Cristóvão de Rio Mau and Santa Eulália de Arnoso, among others, present a square-shape apse and apsidoles.

Churches and monasteries

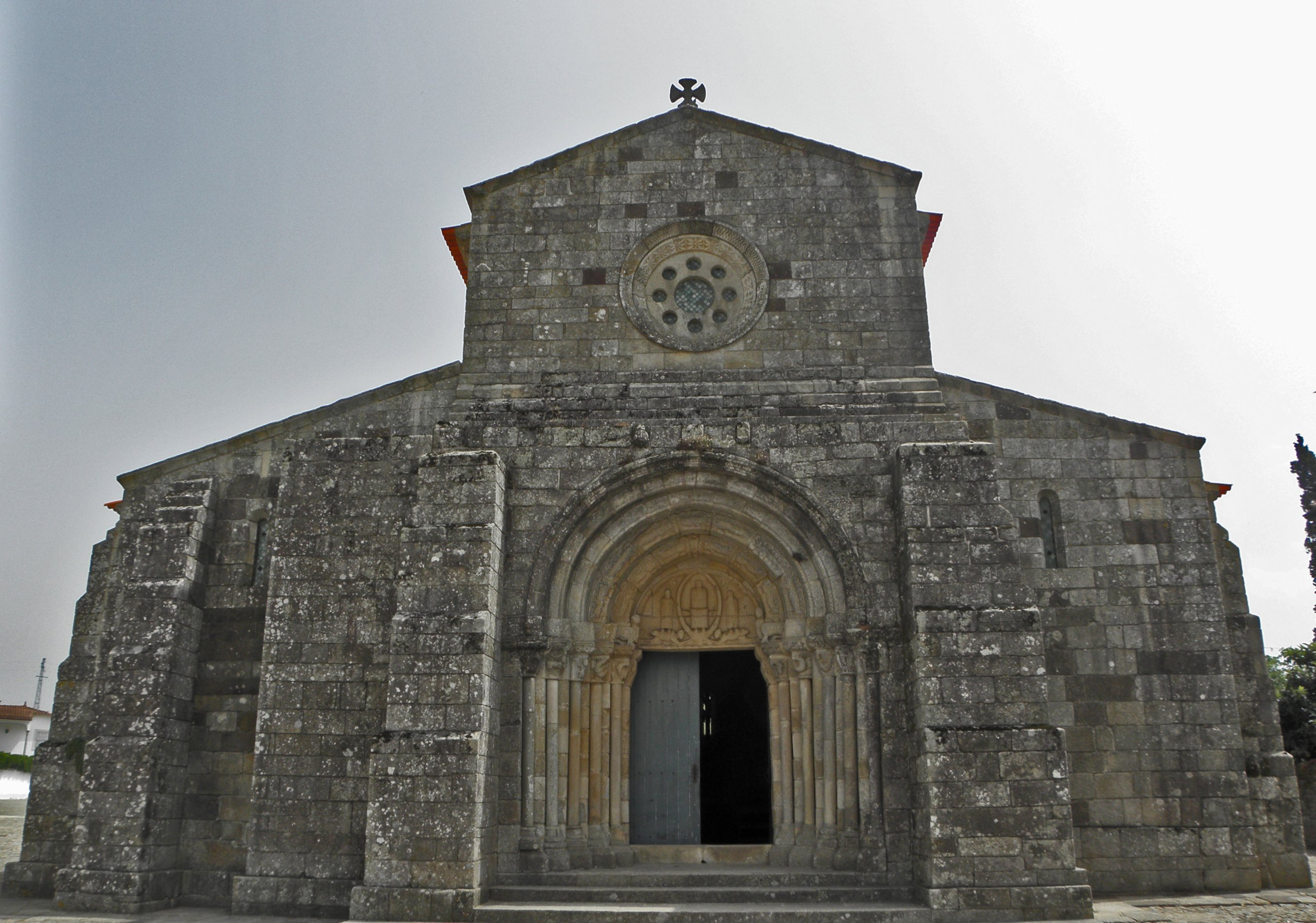
The Monastery of Rates, built by the monks of Cluny, it has a strong and austere facade with heavy buttresses.

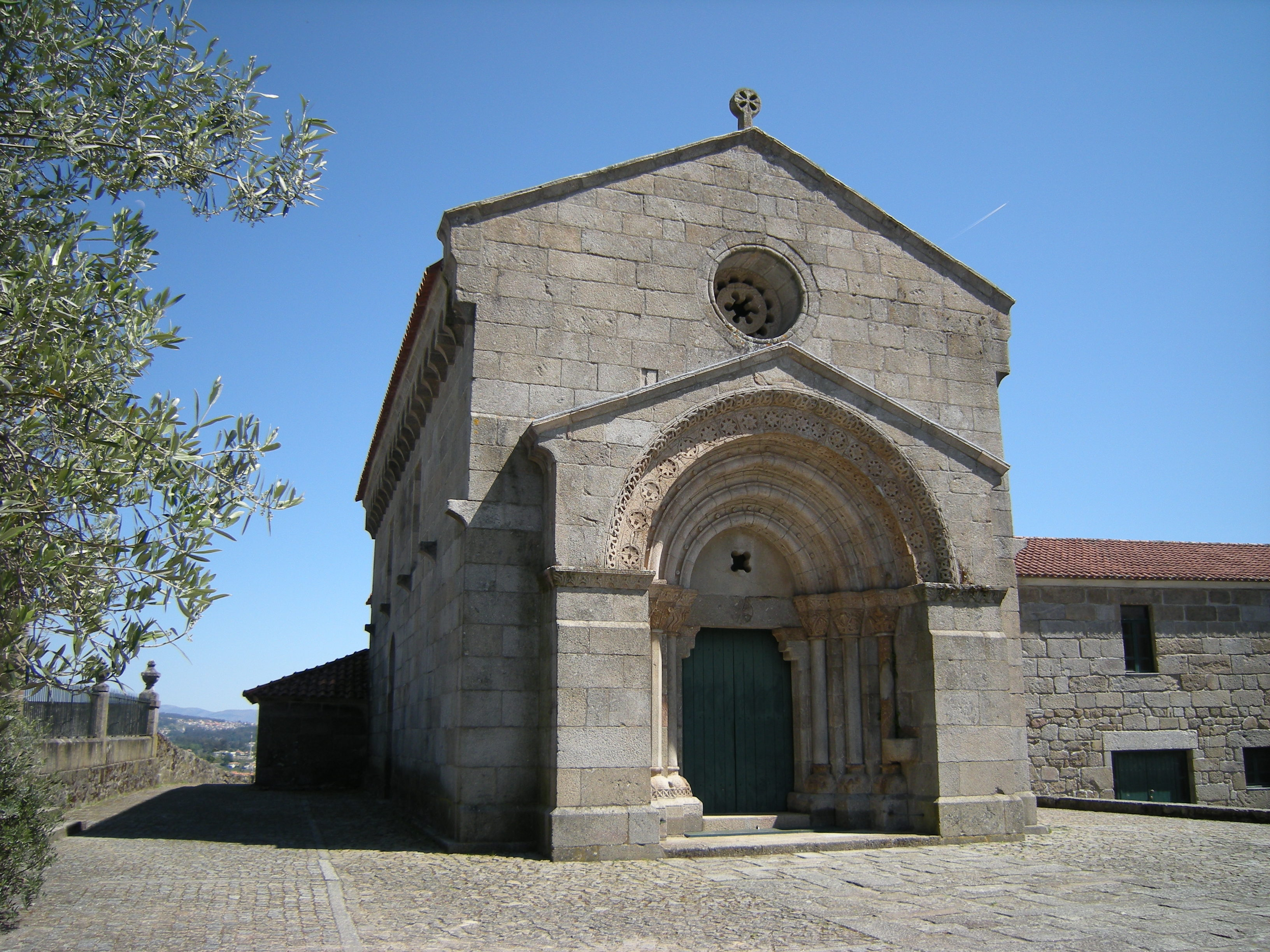
São Vicente de Sousa Church has a projected portal with a small front window.

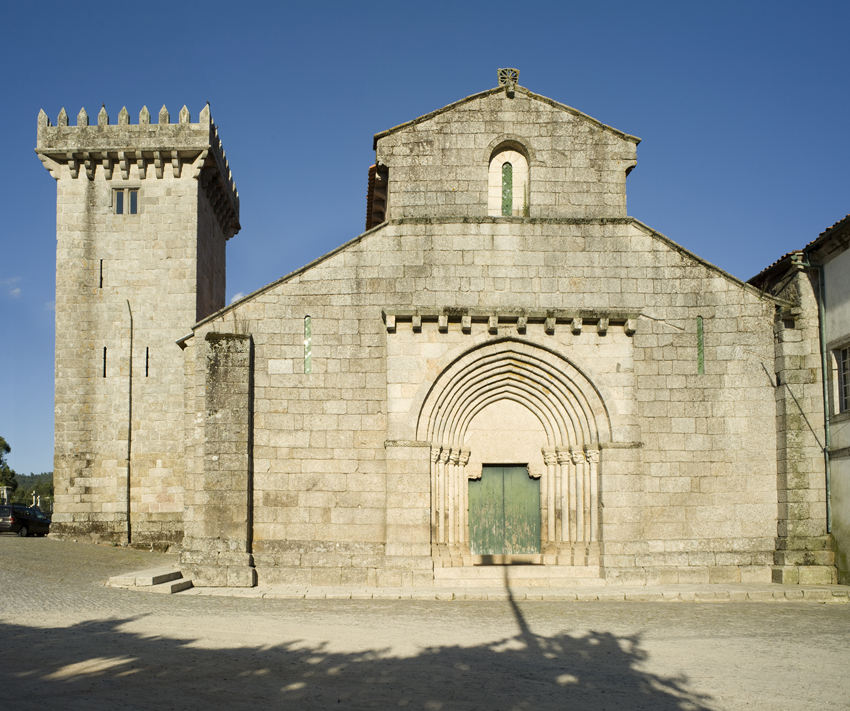
Travanca Monastery facade with a narrow slit window and its unique defensive tower.

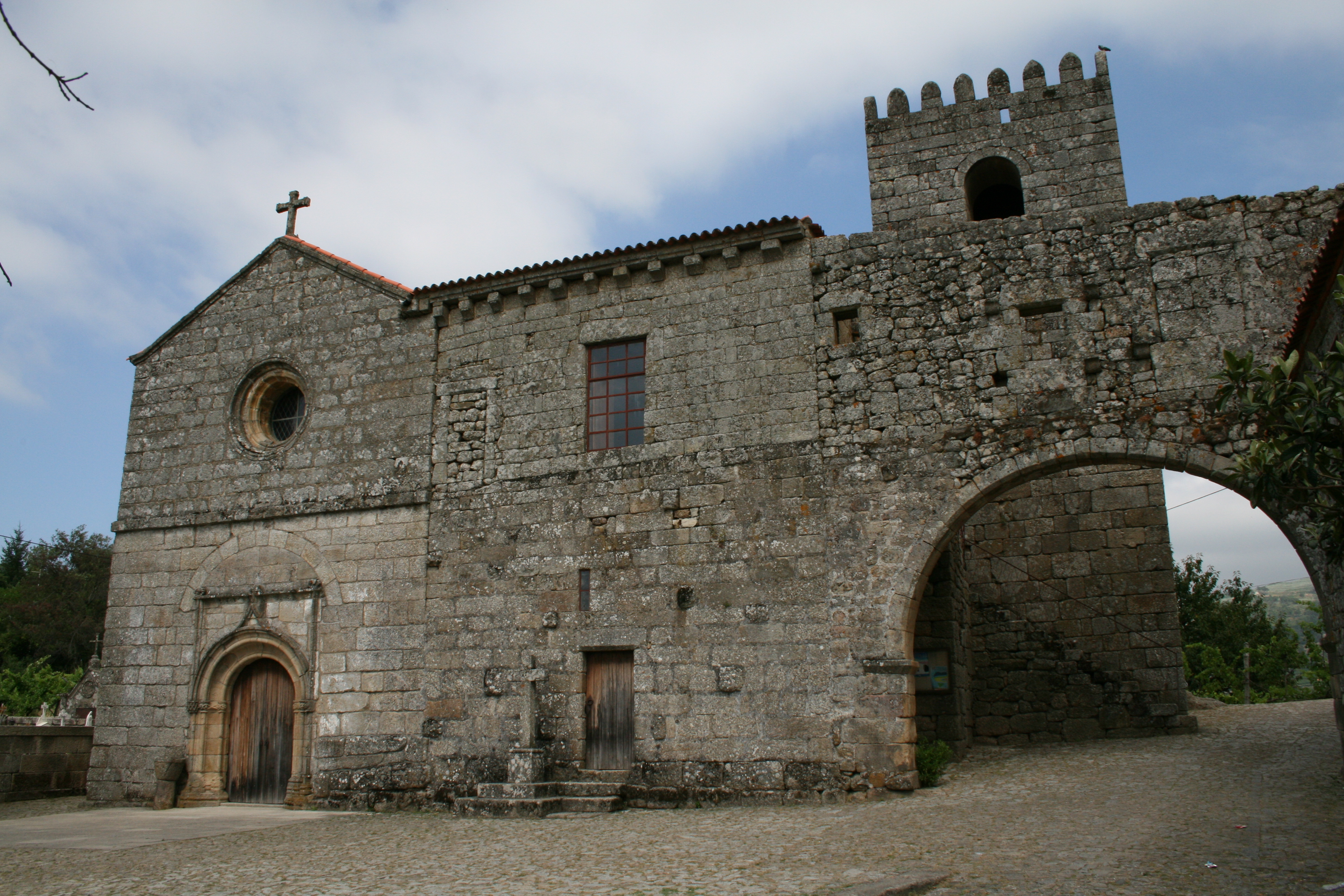
Church of the Monastery of Cárquere, built for the Augustinian Order in the early 12th century.

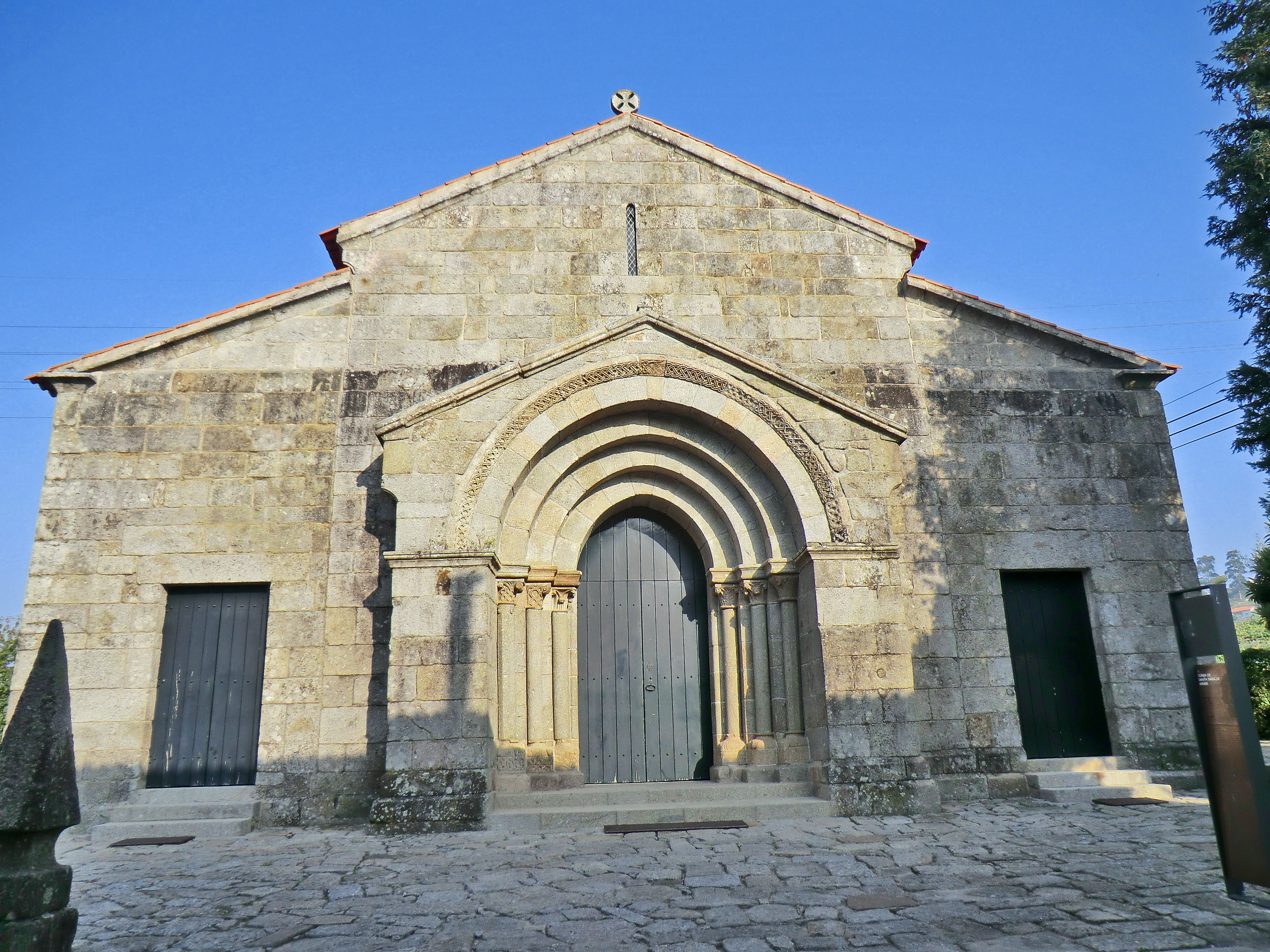
Church of Santa Maria de Airães, with doors for its 3 aisle nave.

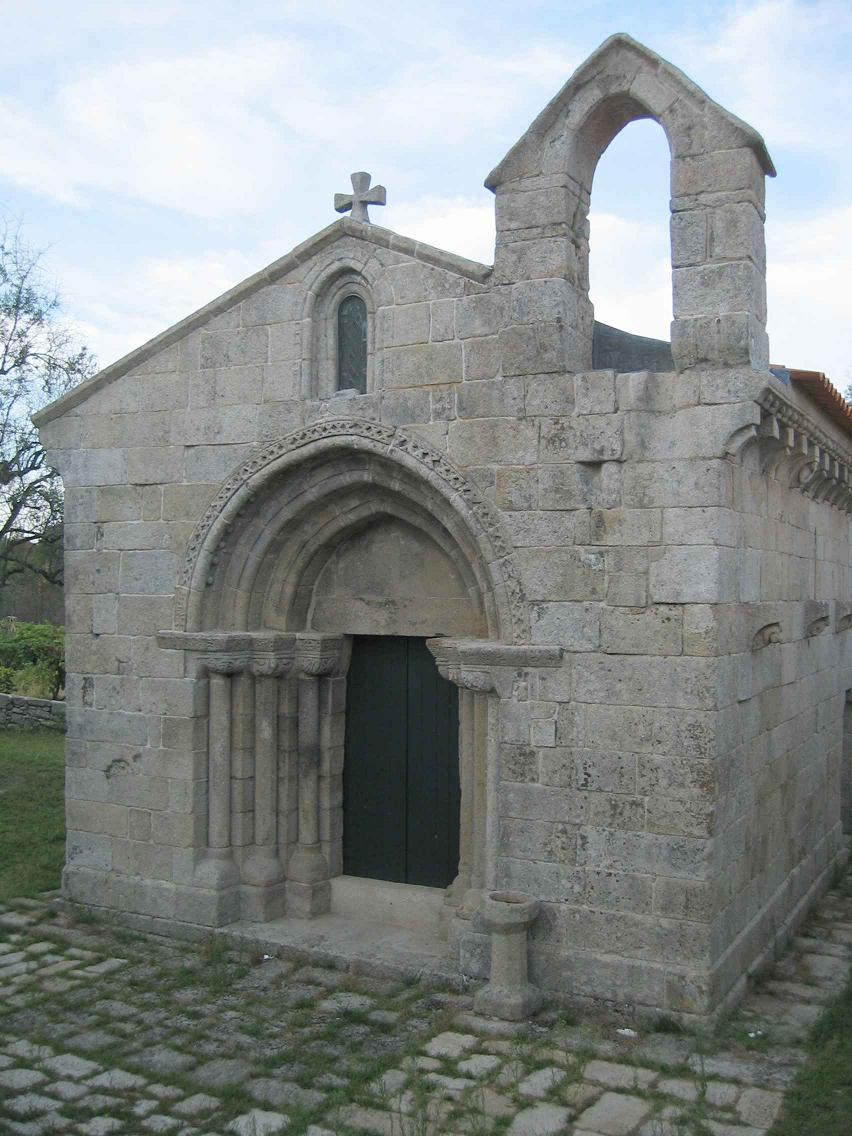
São Gens de Boelhe, a single-nave small parish-church.

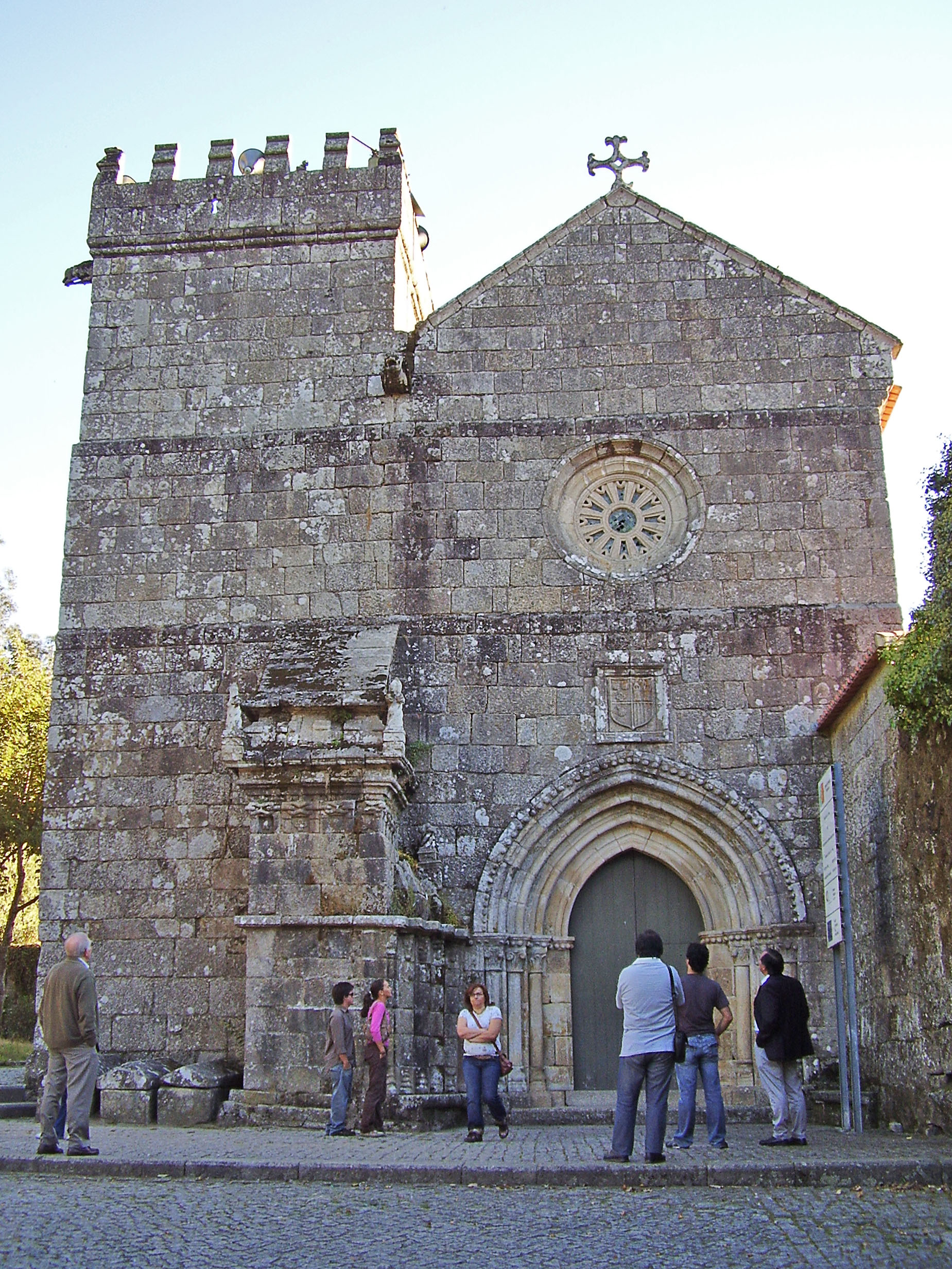
Monastery of Cete, built in the late 9th century, it's one of the oldest surviving monasteries in Portugal.

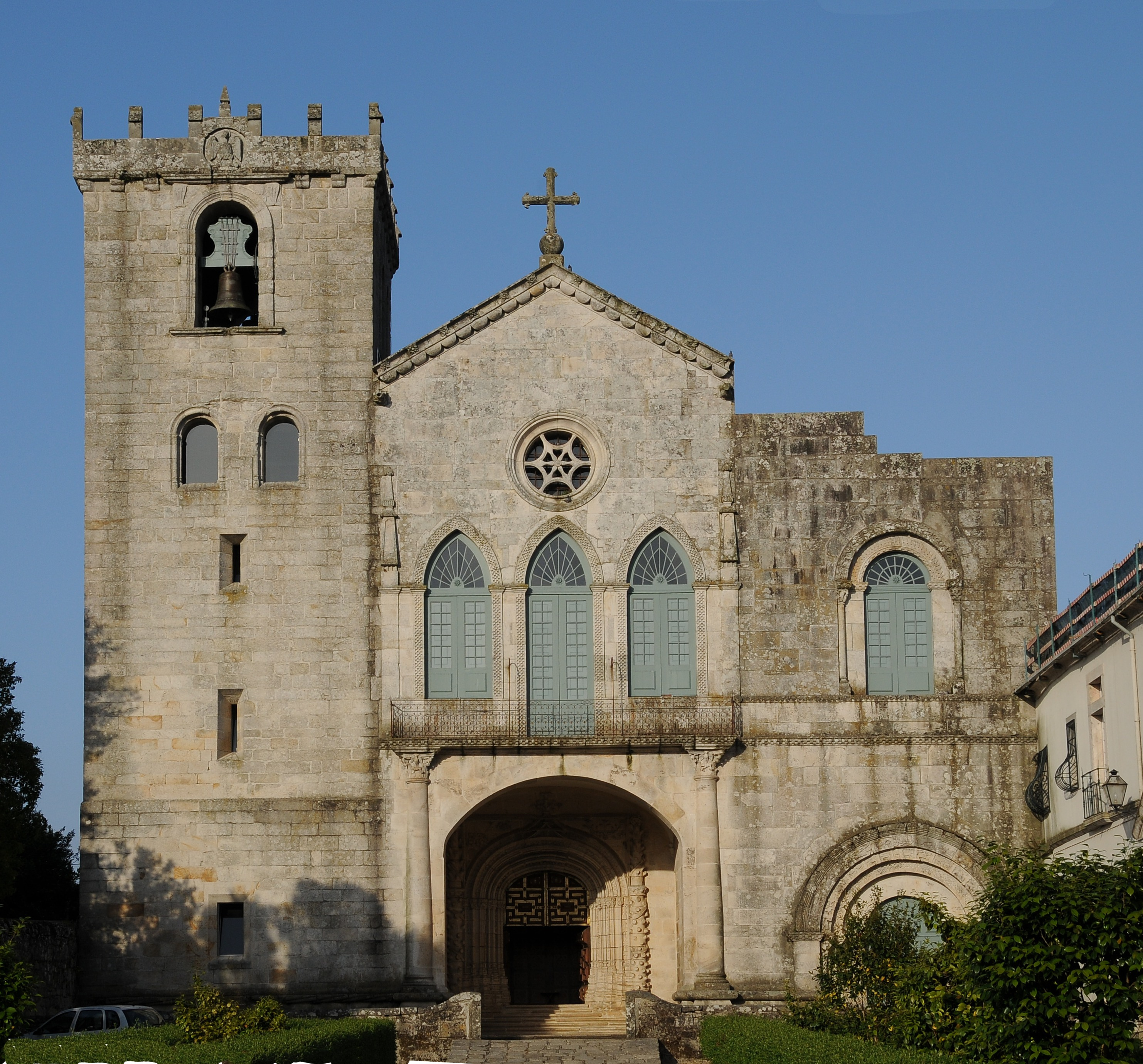
Built in 1057, the Benedictine Monastery of Vilar de Frades is believed to have been founded in 566 AD.

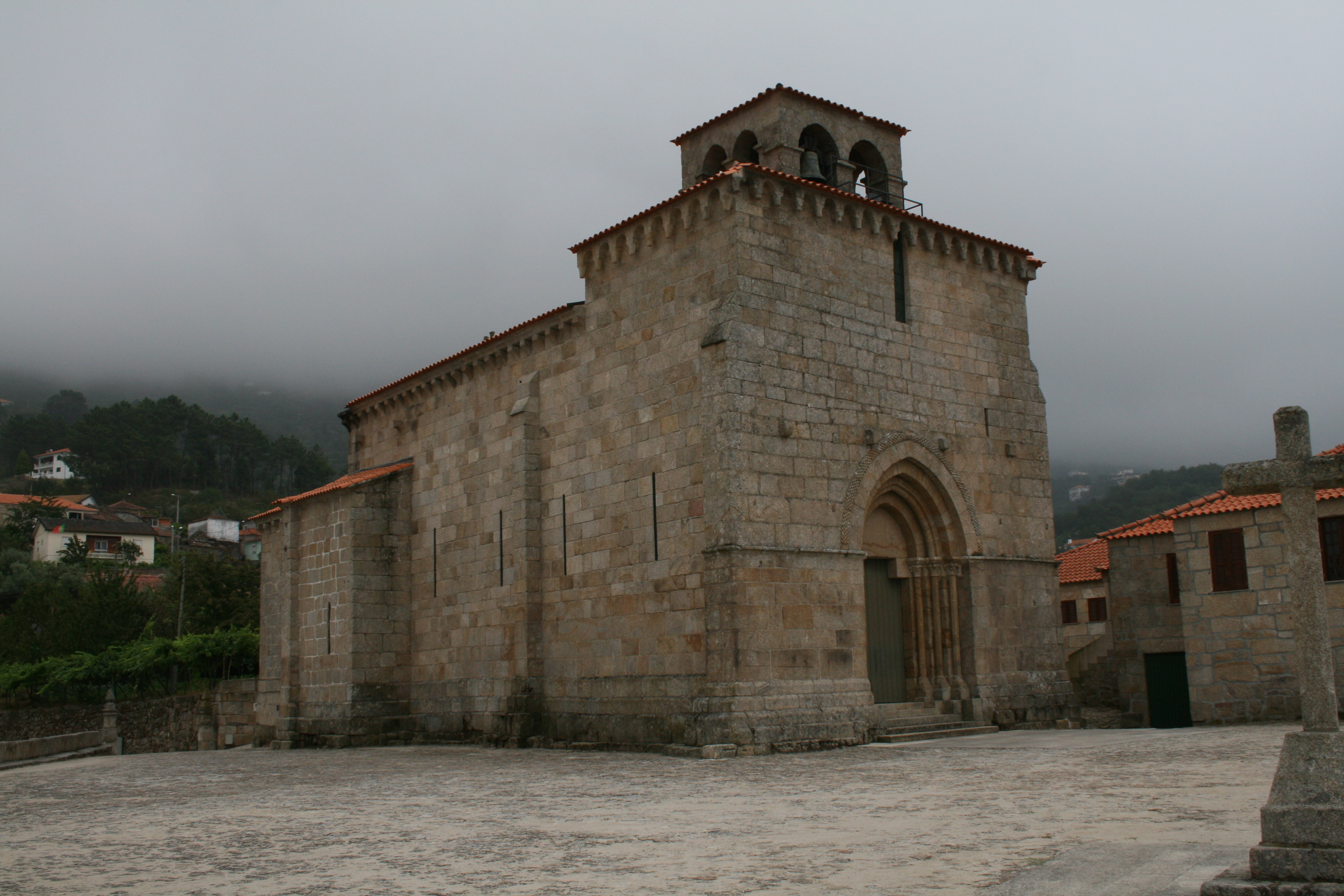
Church of São Martinho de Mouros with its heavy and fortified structure.

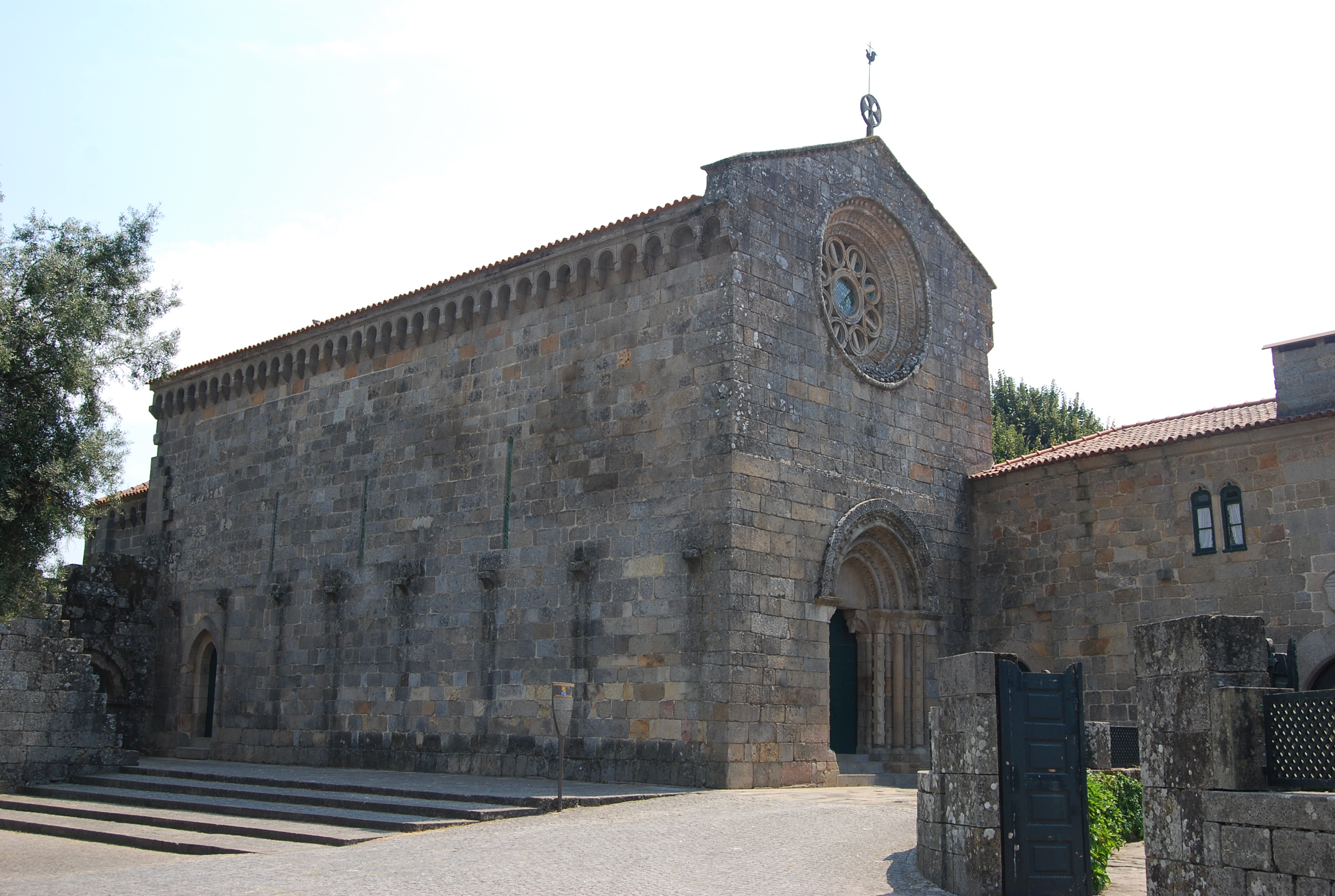
São Pedro de Roriz Church like other Romanesque churches, have a strong and heavy appearance.

=== Interiors ===
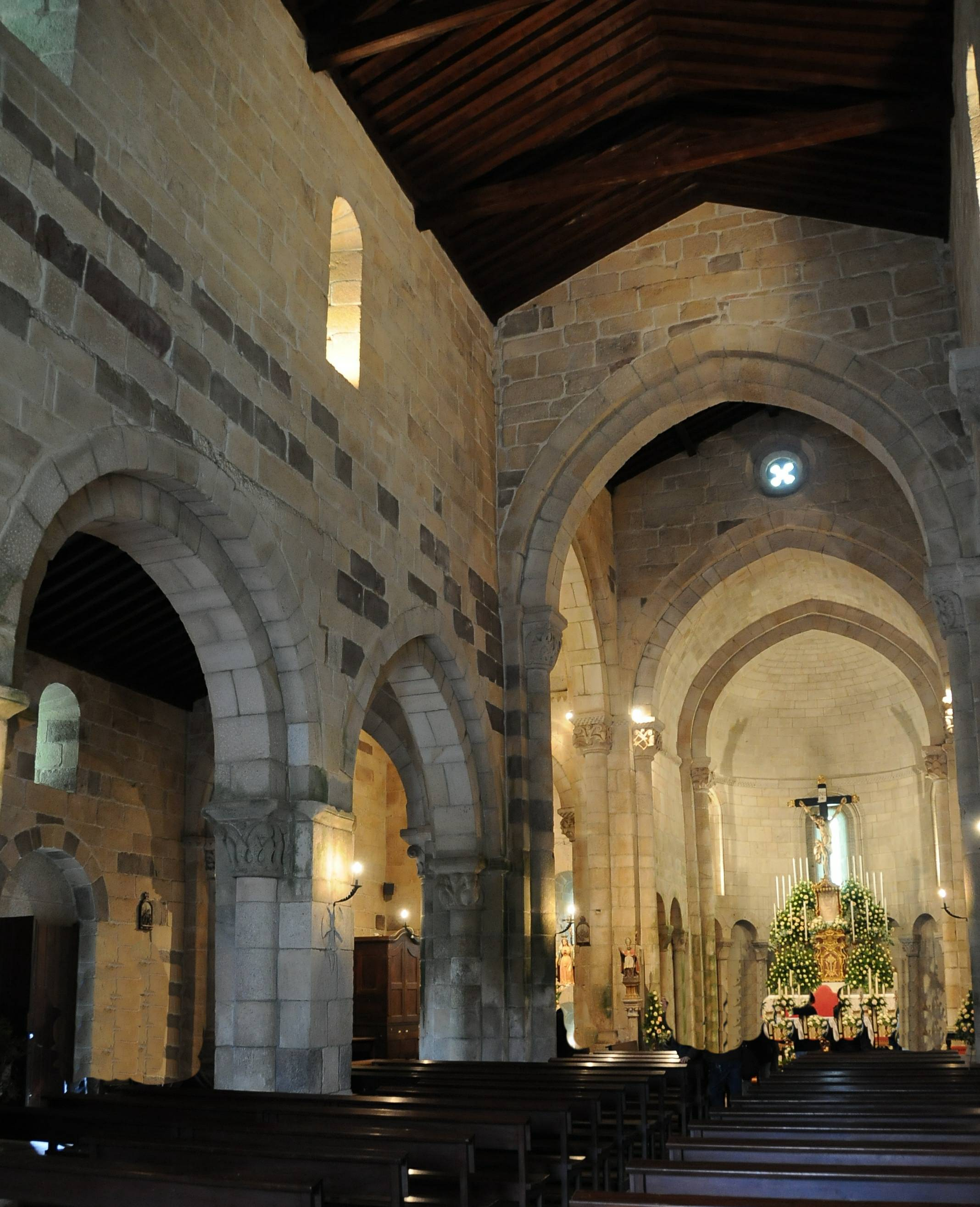
Interior of the church of Monastery of Rates seen towards the main chapel, with its wooden roof and pointed arches.

Most Romanesque monasteries, parish churches and abbey churches in Portugal are aisleless halls with a projecting apse at the chancel end, or sometimes, a projecting rectangular chancel with a chancel arch that might be decorated with mouldings. More ambitious churches have aisles separated from the nave by arcades. The apse is lower or at the same height of the nave. Monasteries are usually larger with 3 aisles supported by decorated columns and piers. The walls are of massive thickness with few and comparatively small openings and almost entirely made out of granite stones.

Arcades can occur in storeys or stages. While the arcade of a cloister is typically of a single stage, the arcade that divides the nave and aisles in a church is typically of two stages, with a third stage of window openings known as the clerestory rising above them. Arcading on a large scale generally fulfils a structural purpose, but it is also used, generally on a smaller scale, as a decorative feature, both internally and externally where it is frequently "blind arcading" with only a wall or a narrow passage behind it.

The arches used in Portuguese Romanesque buildings follow the basic European model and are nearly always semicircular, for openings such as doors and windows, for vaults and for arcades. Wide doorways are usually surmounted by a semi-circular arch, except where a door with a lintel is set into a large arched recess and surmounted by a semi-circular lunette with decorative carving. These doors sometimes have a carved central jamb. Narrow doors and small windows might be surmounted by a solid stone lintel. Larger openings are nearly always arched. A characteristic feature of Portuguese Romanesque architecture, both ecclesiastic and domestic, is the pairing of two arcade openings, separated by a pillar or colonette and often set within a larger arch. There were some number of buildings in which pointed arches have been used extensively, apparently for stylistic reasons and it is believed that in these cases there is a direct influence of Mozarabic and/or Islamic architecture. At other late Romanesque churches the pointed arch was introduced as a structural device in ribbed vaulting. Its increasing application was fundamental to the development of Gothic architecture.

Although basically rectangular, piers can often be of highly complex form, with half-segments of large hollow-core columns on the inner surface supporting the arch, or a clustered group of smaller shafts leading into the mouldings of the arch. Piers that occur at the intersection of two large arches, such as those under the crossing of the nave and transept, are commonly cruciform in shape, each arch having its own supporting rectangular pier at right angles to the other. Columns, colonnettes and attached shafts are also used structurally and for decoration. Arcades of columns cut from single pieces are also common in structures that do not bear massive weights of masonry, such as cloisters, where they are sometimes paired.

The majority of buildings have wooden roofs, generally of a simple truss, tie beam or king post form. In the case of trussed rafter roofs, they are sometimes lined with wooden ceilings in three sections like those that survive at the monasteries of Rates or Paço de Sousa. Some others are completely barrel vaulted or a mix between wooden roofs and a vaulted apse. In later stages rib vaulting started to be used as an experiment in main altar roofs.

Vaults, columns and arches

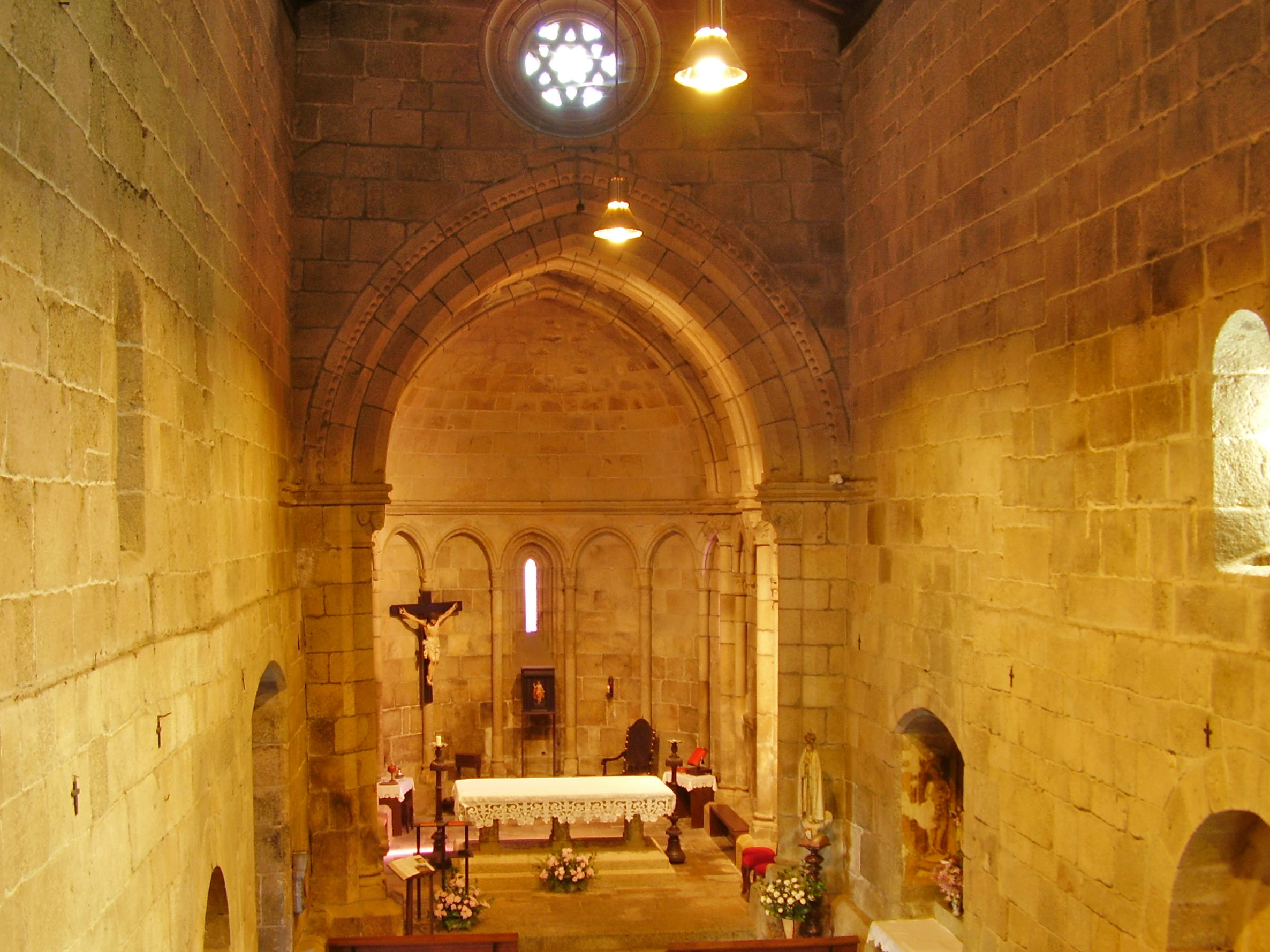
Main altar and single nave of the Monastery of Cete.

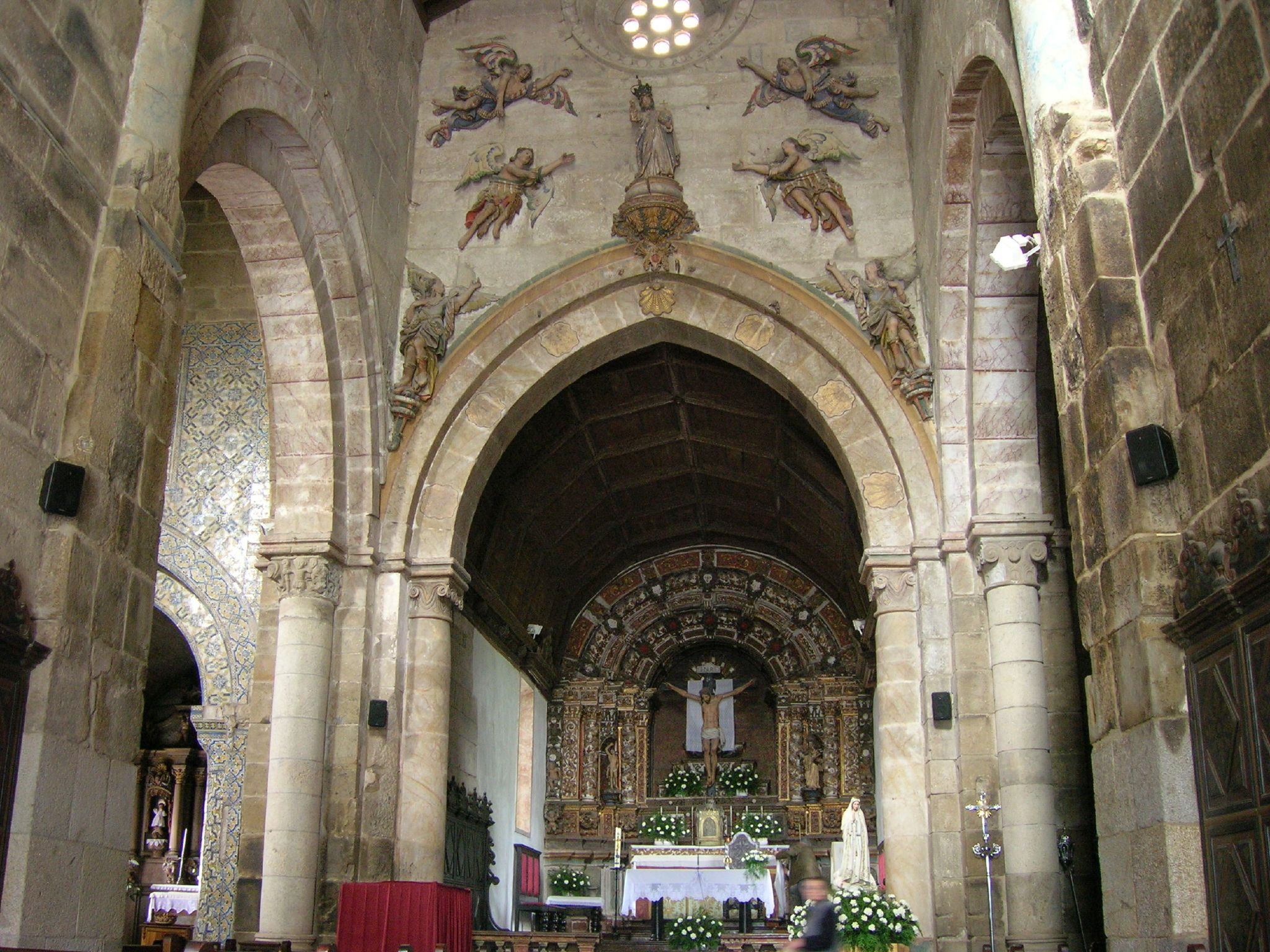
Columns and arches of the Church of São Salvador de Paderne, where groups of attached shafts support each arcade.

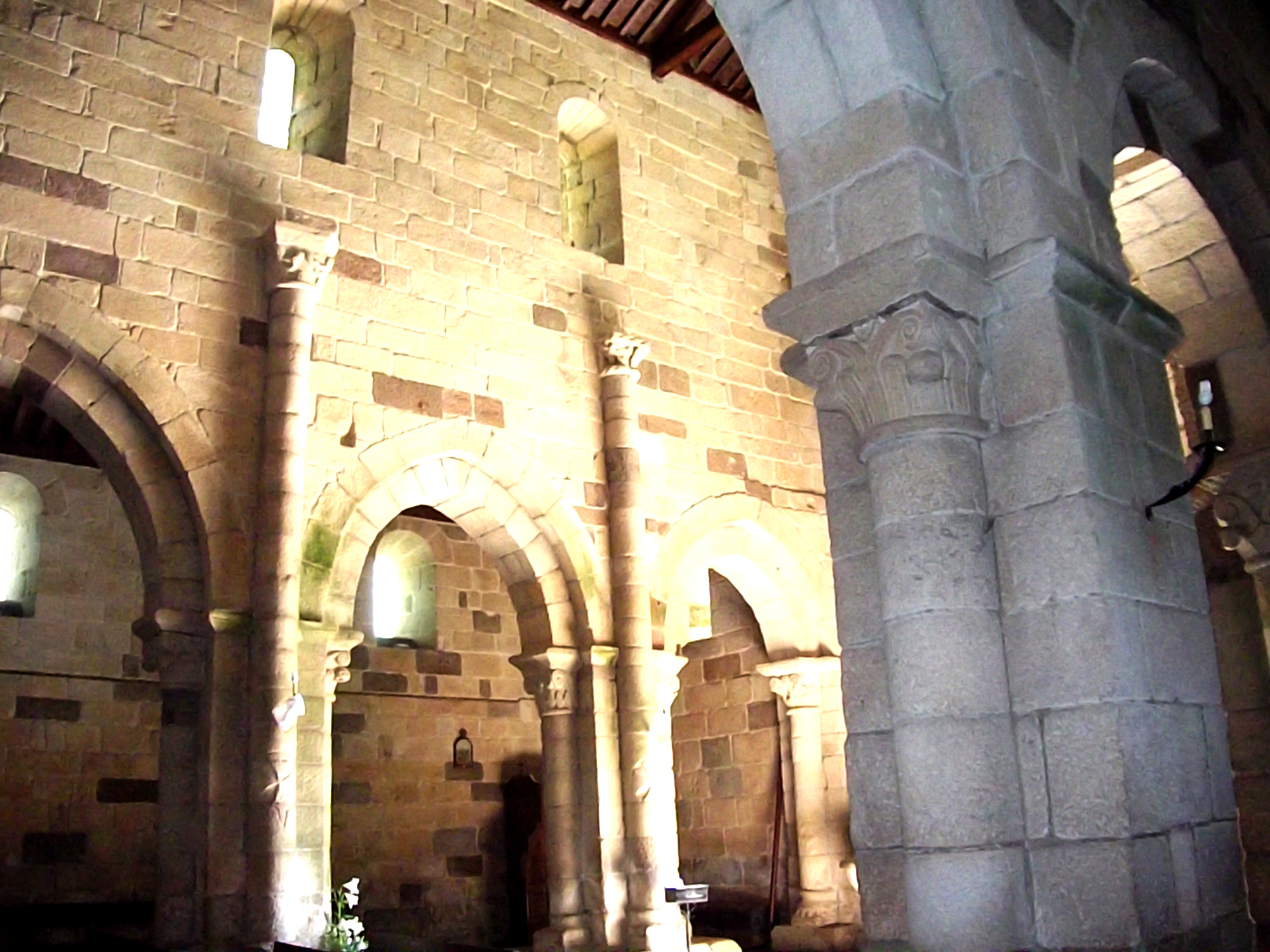
The nave of Rates Monastery with decorative columns that were probably meant to support a barrel vault that was never built.

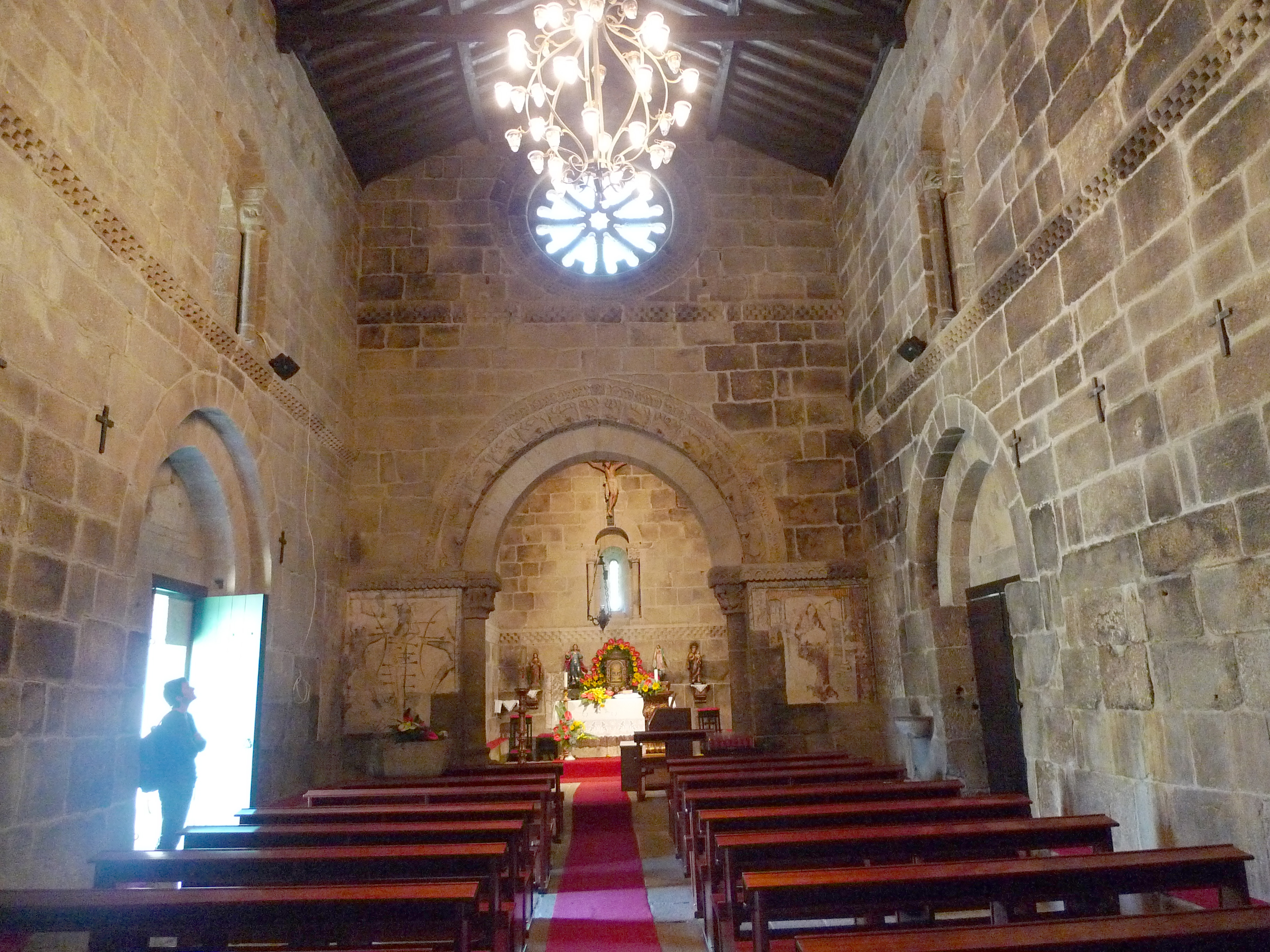
The Church of São Salvador de Bravães and it's mural paintings on the main altar sides.

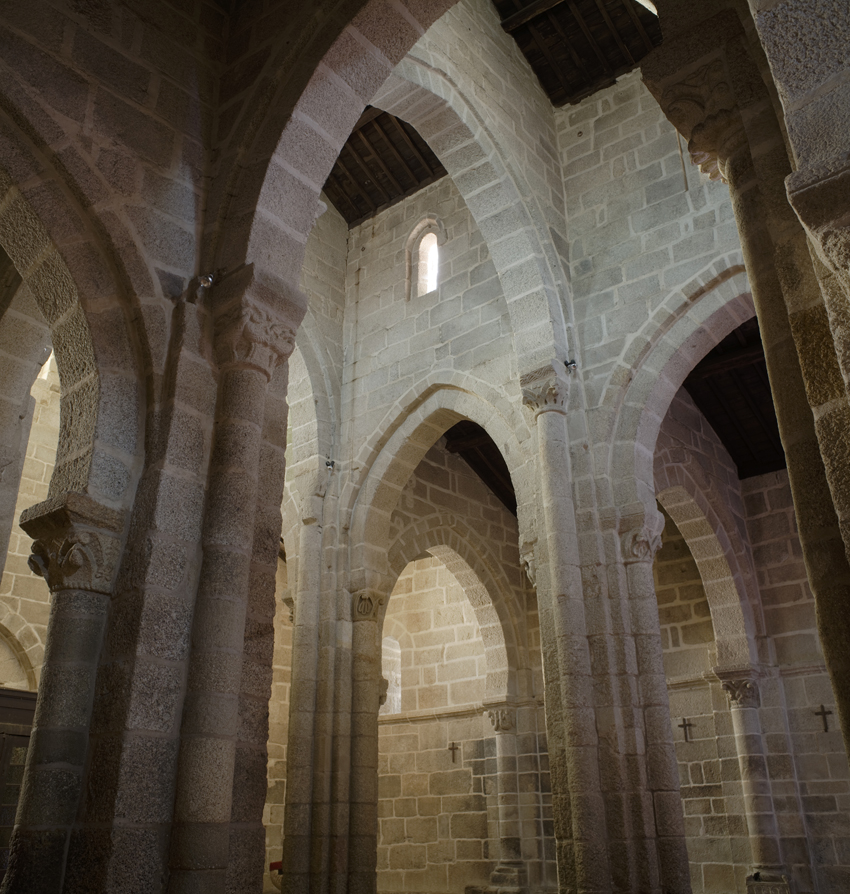
Nave of Travanca Monastery, the use of pointed arches for the arcades is clearly visible.

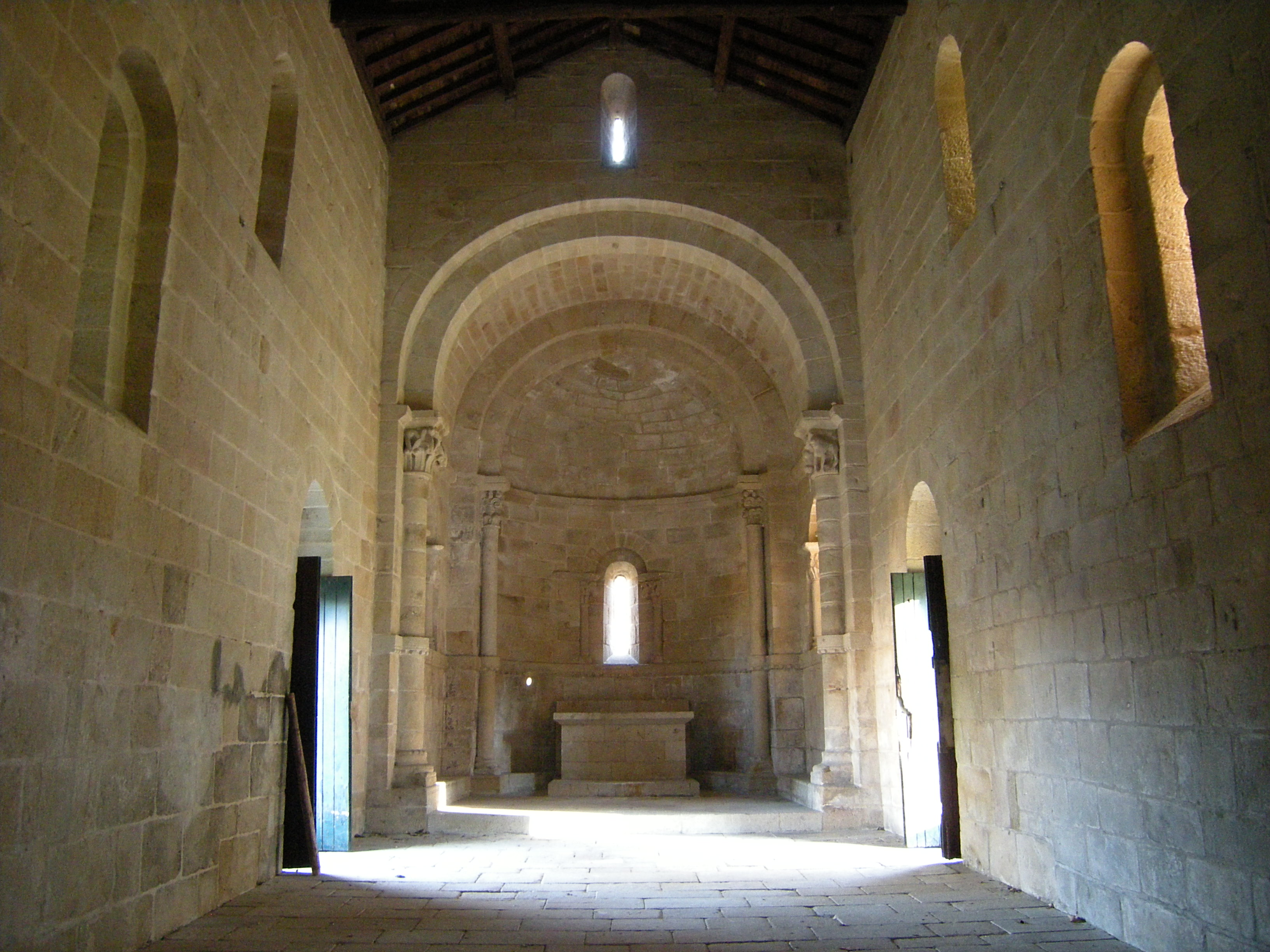
Main altar and nave of the church of Sanfins de Friestas, the narrow lateral and front windows are another Romanesque trademark.

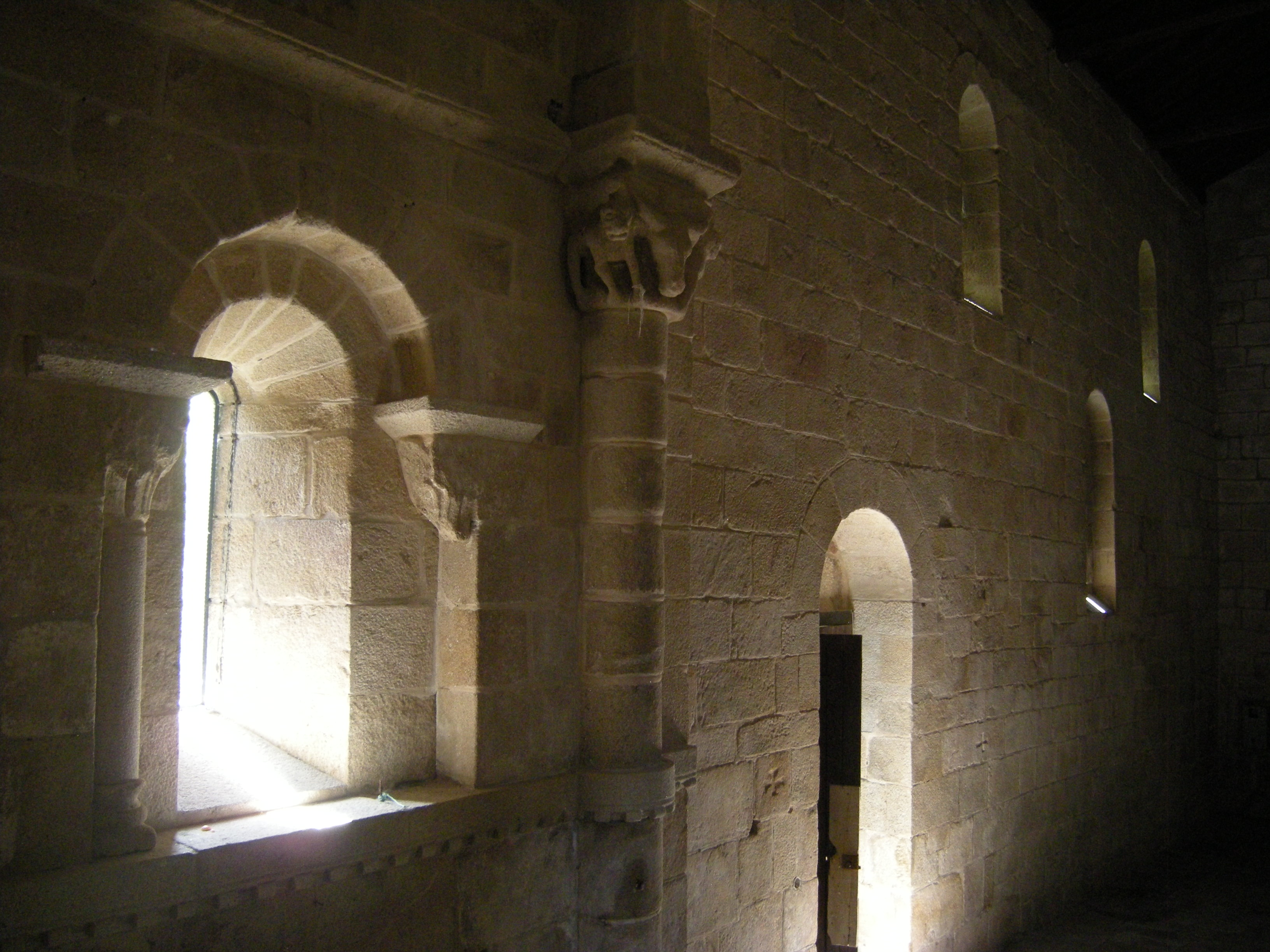
Interior of the church of São Pedro de Ferreira Monastery with small openings and carved capitals.

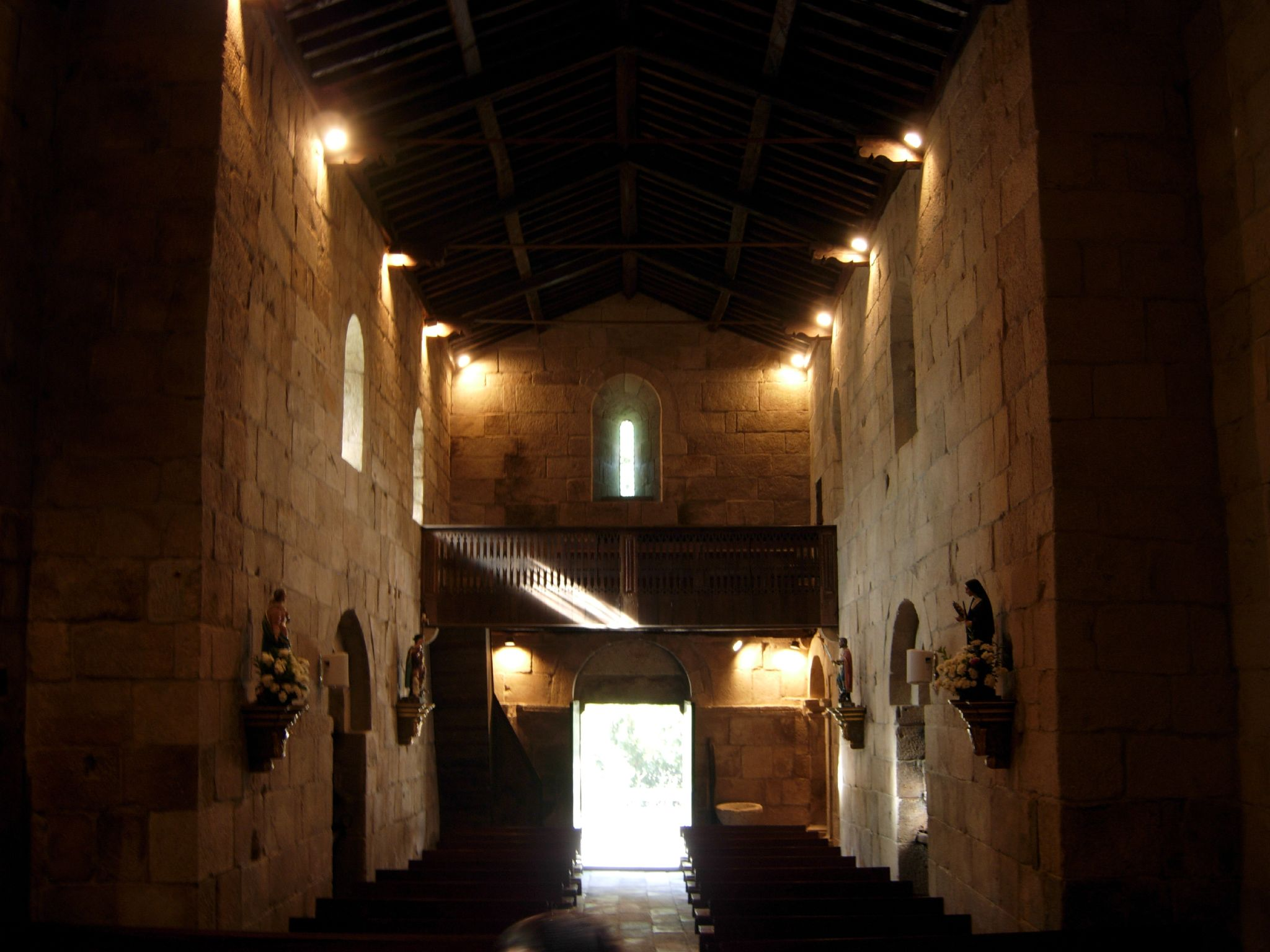
Interior of the Church of São Pedro de Rubiães seen towards the main entrance, with its wooden roof.

=== Portals ===
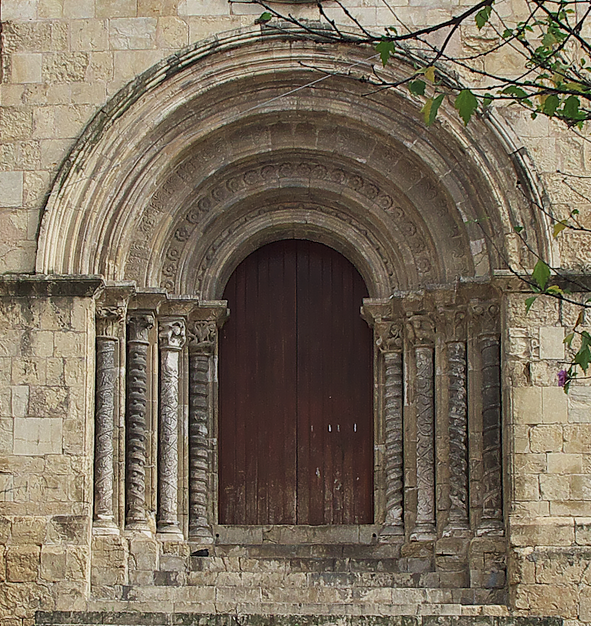
Portal of the Church of Santiago in Coimbra has columns decorated with detailed motifs.

Romanesque churches generally have a single portal centrally placed on the west front, the focus of decoration for the facade of the building, and both the largest and the smallest, had lateral entrances that were commonly used by worshippers. Doorways have a character form, with the jambs having a series of receding planes, into each of which is set a circular shaft, all surmounted by a continuous abacus.

The semi-circular arch which rises from the abacus has the same serried planes and circular mouldings as the jambs. The arch consists typically of four planes containing three shafts, but there may be as many as twelve shafts, symbolic of the apostles.

The opening of the portal may be arched, or may be set with a lintel supporting a tympanum, generally carved. A carved tympanum generally constitutes the major sculptural work of a Romanesque church. The subject of the carving on a major portal may be Christ in Majesty or the Last Judgement. Lateral doors may include other subjects such as the Birth of Christ. The portal may be protected by a porch, from simple open porches to more elaborate structures. The religious context of the art at the time was well noticeable in the churches carvings, both inside the church as outside. They showed several episodes of the life of saints and various myths and biblical stories. Those that were sculptured specially in the tympanums, capitals and collonettes of the portals can be divided into two major themes:

- Representations of apotropaic motifs, such as crosses and esoteric symbols.
- Representations of Theophanies or "Maiestas Domini" (Christ in Majesty) such as "Agnus Dei" (the mystical lamb trespassed by a cross) or Christ in mandorla surrounded by prophets, angels and tetramorphs.
Portals

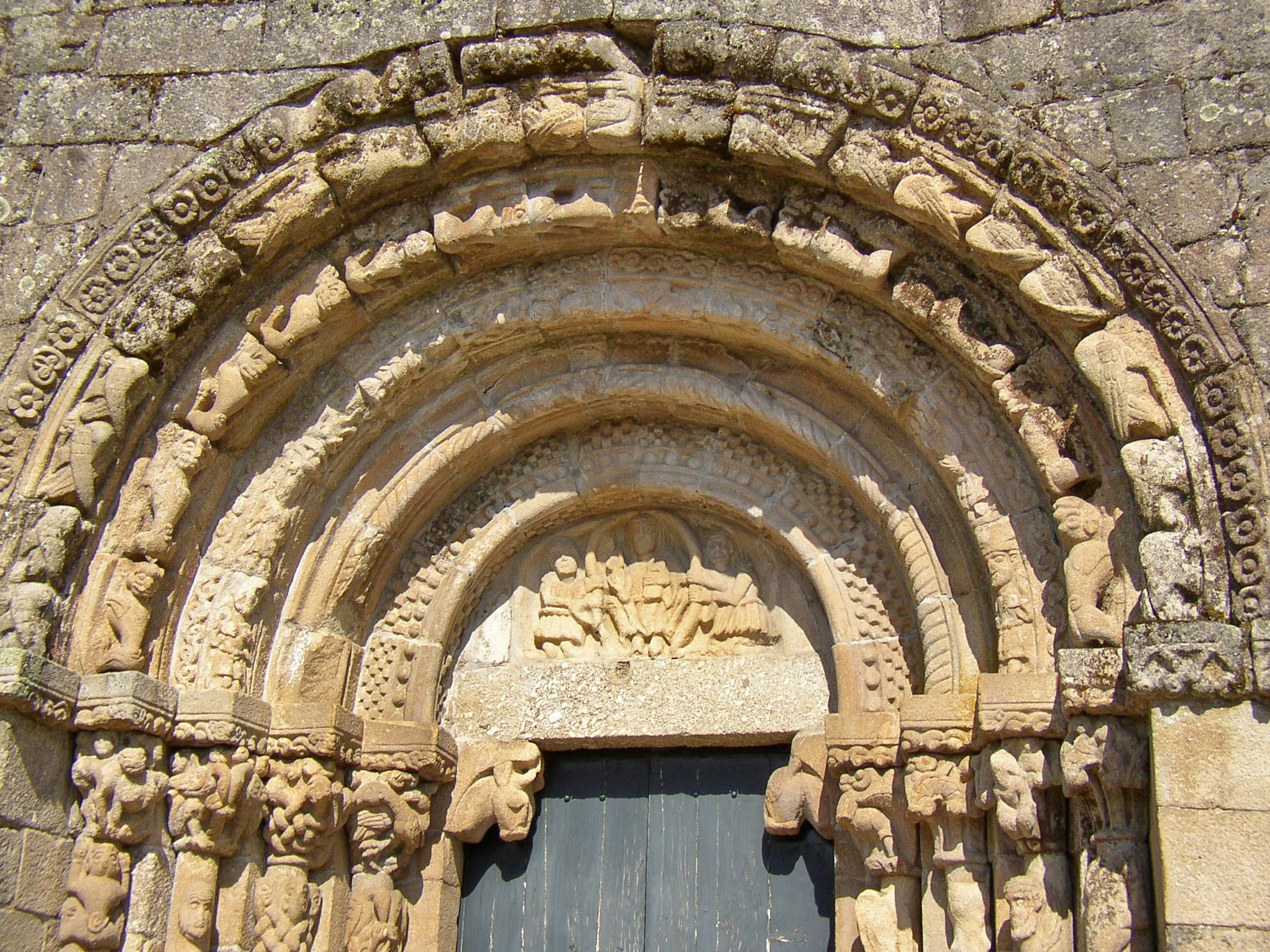
Tympanum of the church of São Salvador de Bravães, Christ surrounded by two of His disciples.

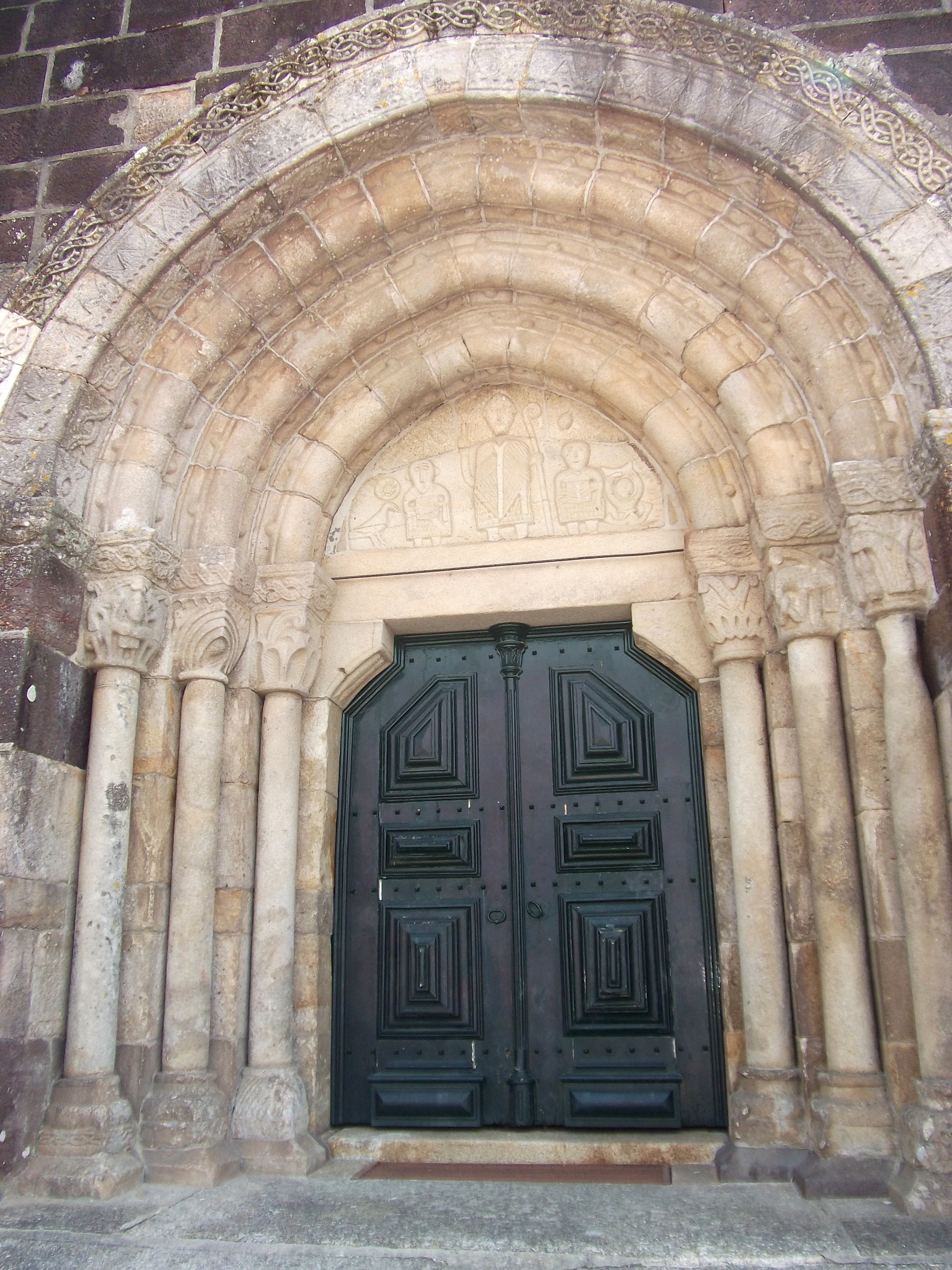
Portal of São Cristóvão de Rio Mau with anthropomorphic and vegetalist motifs.

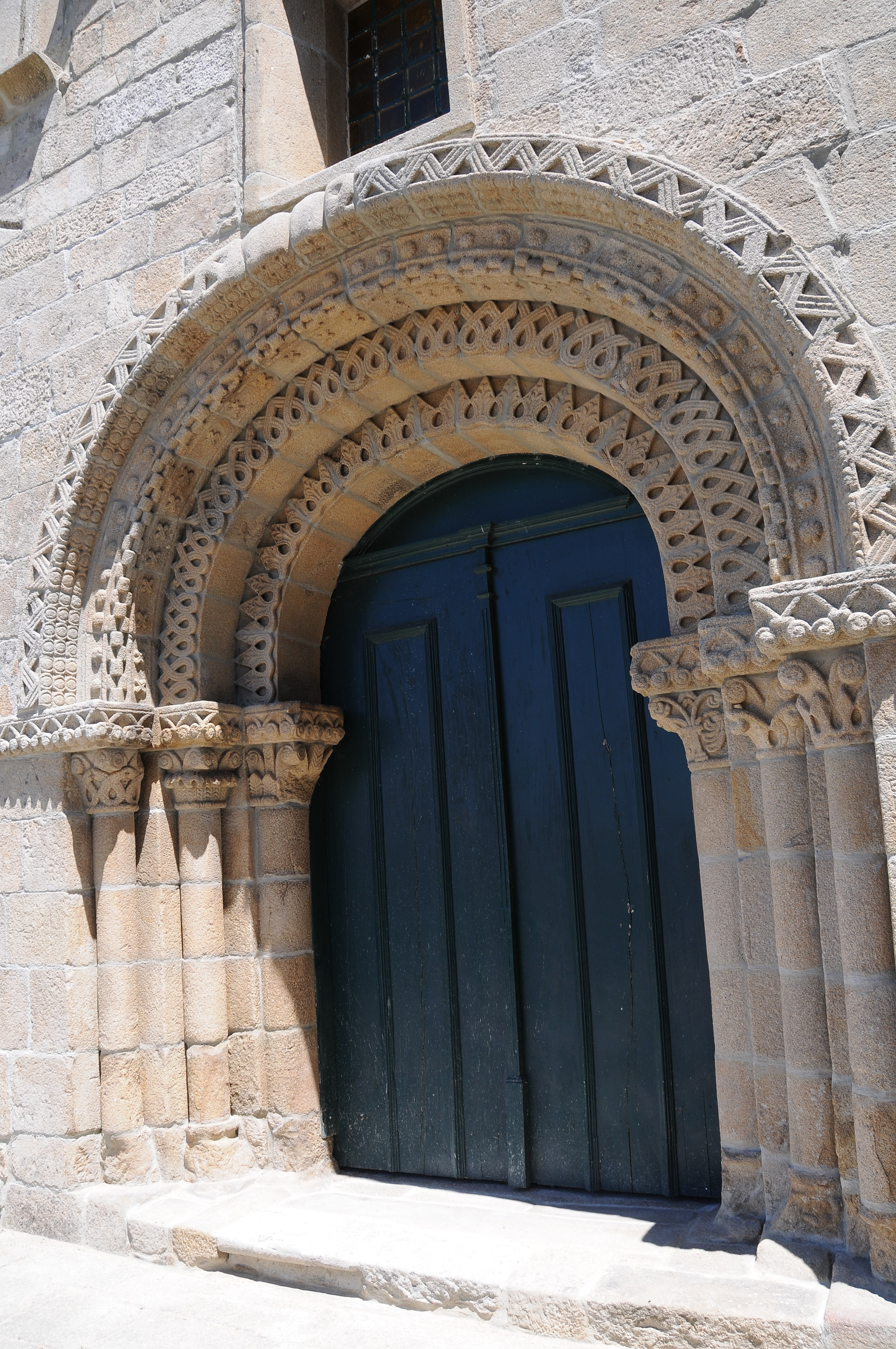
Church of Manhente portal and its intricate carvings.

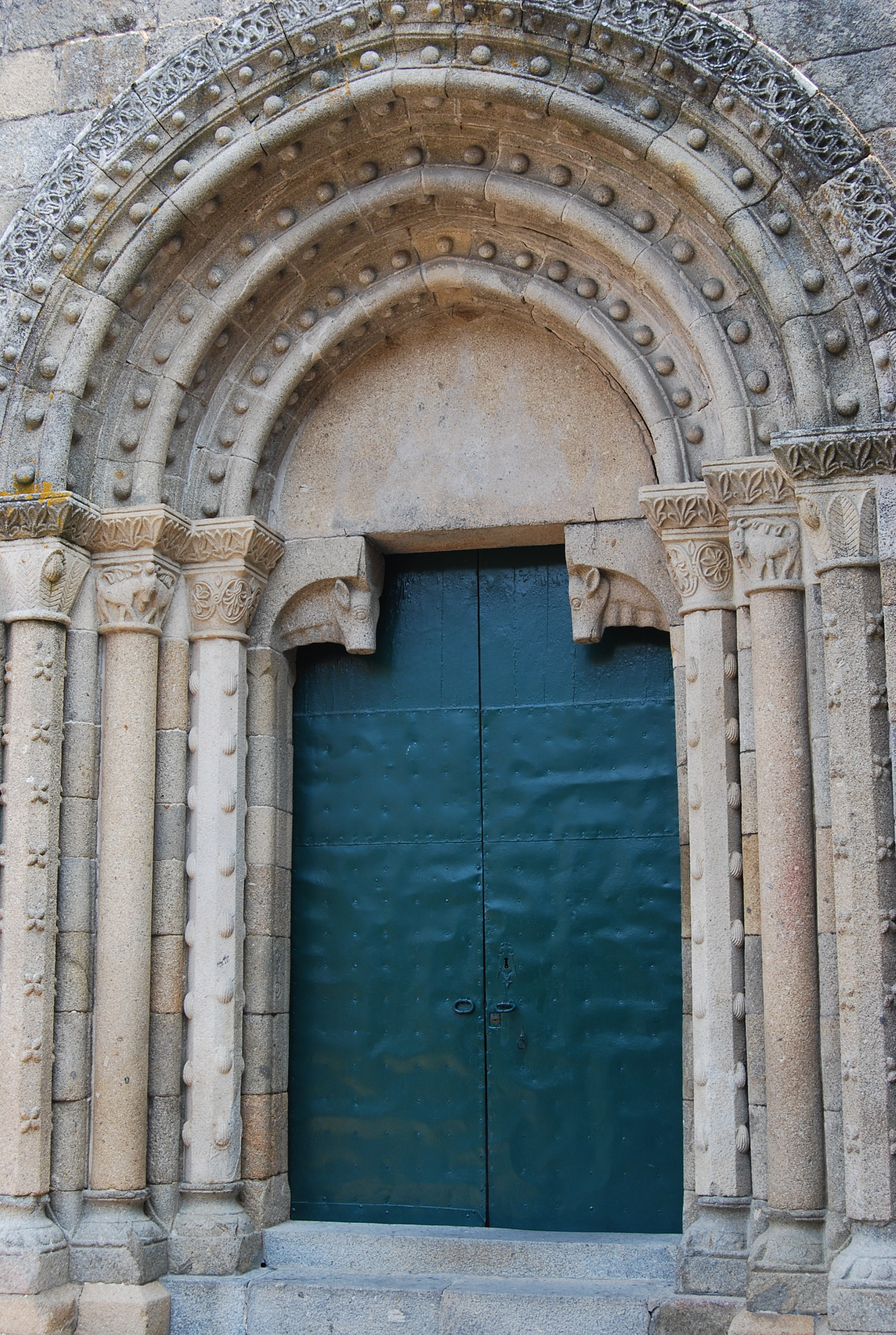
São Pedro de Roriz, with animals decorating the jambs and carvings on the columns.

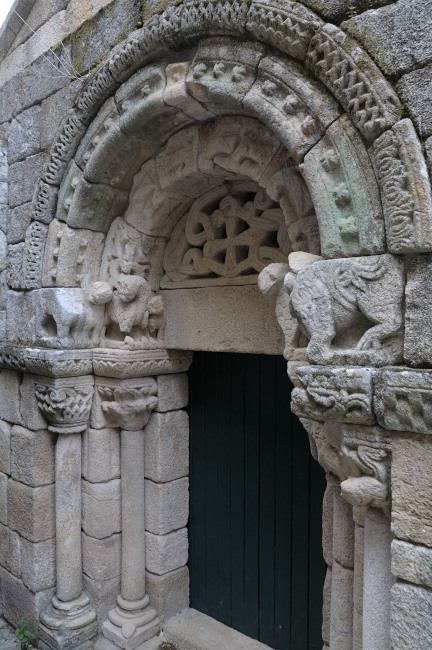
Lateral door of the Monastery of São Pedro das Águias with mythological animals and esoteric motifs.

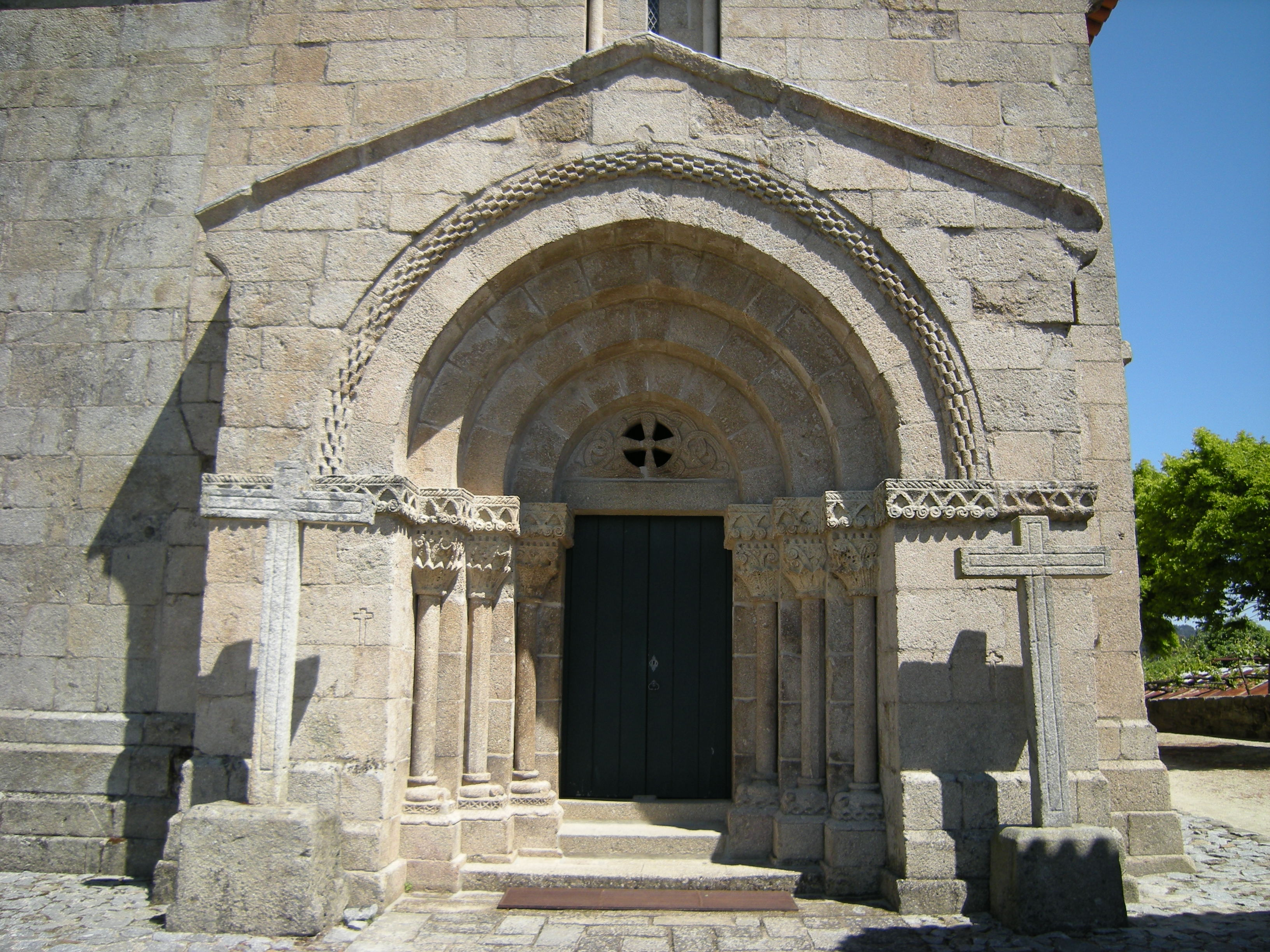
The Church of São Salvador de Unhão has a portal protected by a porch.

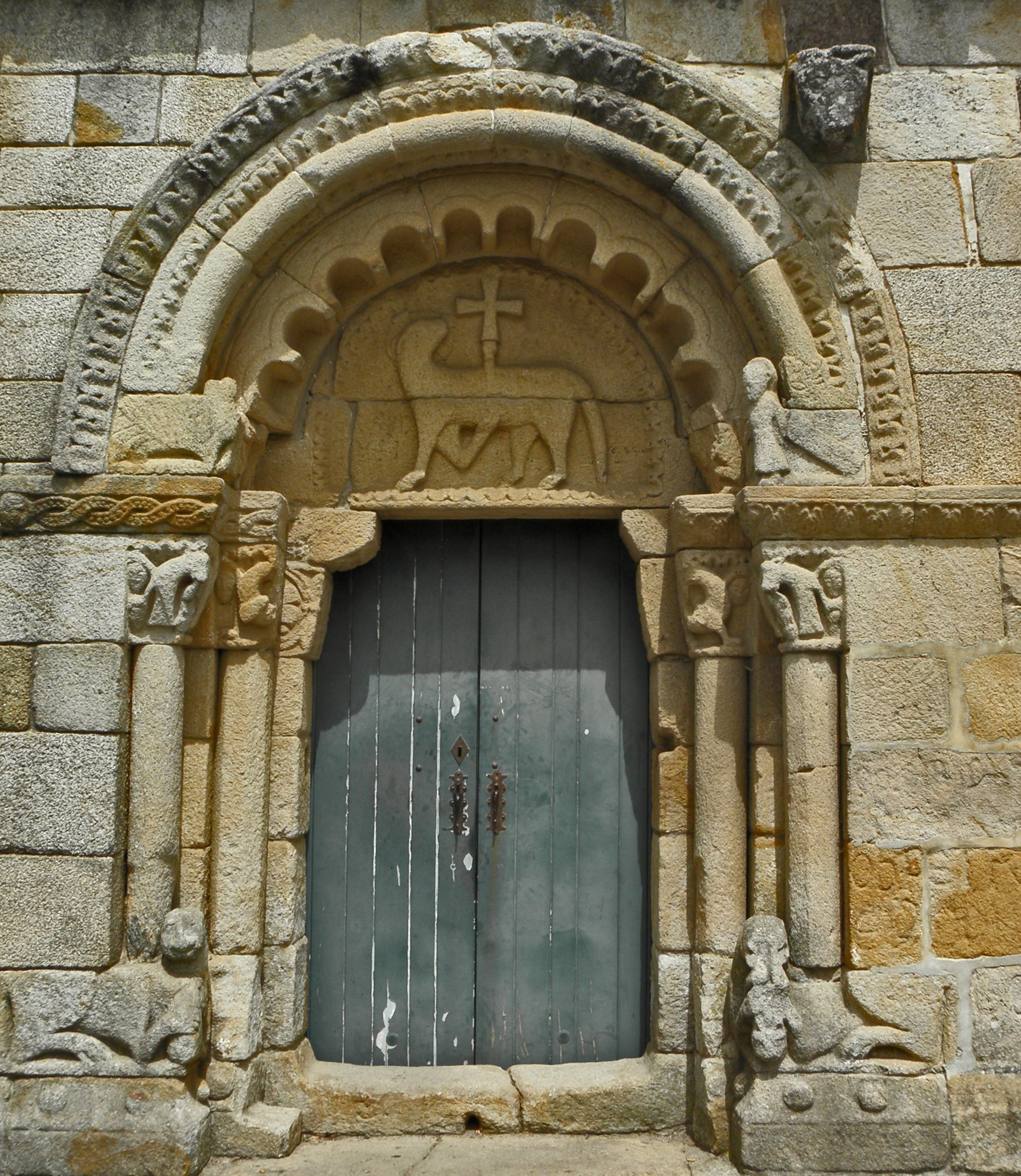
Lateral door of Rates Monastery with the Agnus Dei: the Lamb of God carrying a cross.

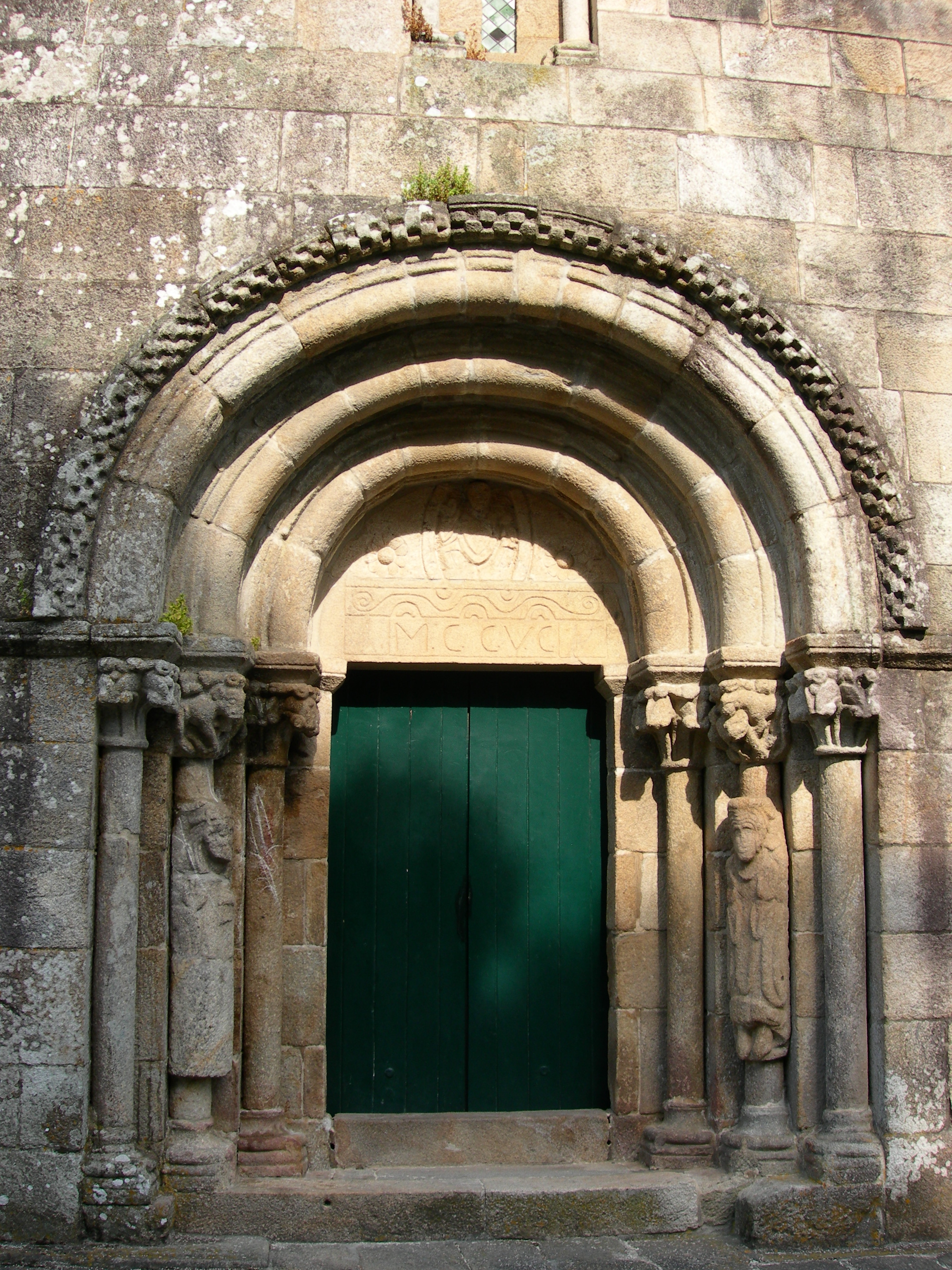
Portal of the church of São Pedro de Rubiães with two human figures on the door collonettes and Christ in Majesty on the tympanum.

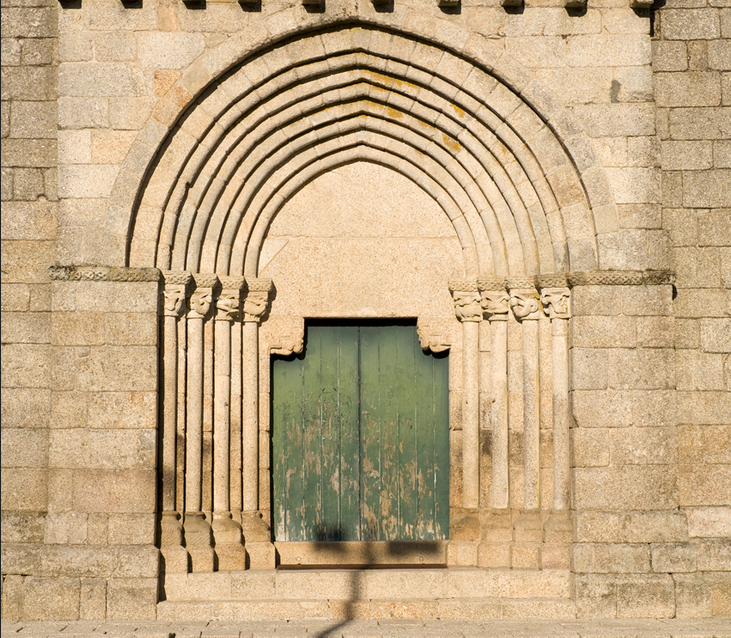
Travanca Monastery has a pointed arch portal, a feature that would later be developed in Gothic architecture.

=== Capitals ===
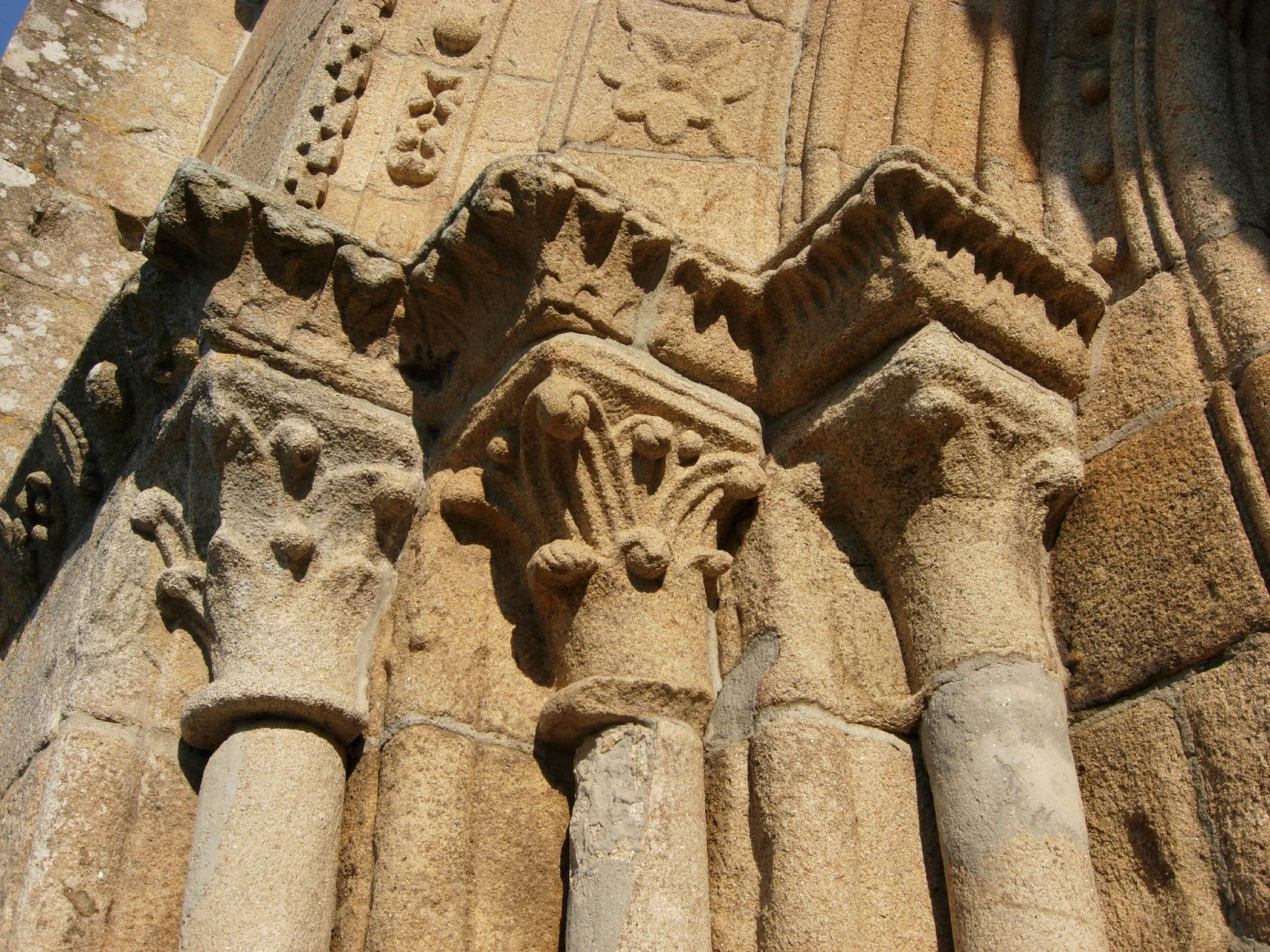
Vegetalist capitals at the chapel of Nossa Senhora da Orada.

The foliate Corinthian style provided the inspiration for many Romanesque capitals, and the accuracy with which they were carved depended very much on the availability of original models, being some much closer to the Classical than others.

The Corinthian capital is essentially round at the bottom where it sits on a circular column and square at the top, where it supports the wall or arch. This form of capital was maintained in the general proportions and outline of the Romanesque capital. This was achieved most simply by cutting a rectangular cube and taking the four lower corners off at an angle so that the block was square at the top, but octagonal at the bottom. This shape lent itself to a wide variety of superficial treatments, sometimes foliate in imitation of the source, but often figurative, without forgetting that the kind of stone used for construction of Romanesque churches in Portugal was mostly granite which made the carving of intricate and sharp details much harder.

Figurative capitals display significant regional originality. While some draw upon manuscripts illustrations depicting Biblical scenes, beasts, and mythical creatures, others illustrate episodes from the lives of local saints. These carvings fulfilled both a decorative and didactic function, conveying moral instruction on virtue and sin to medieval congregations.

Another important aspect of the iconography represented in capitals throughout the Portuguese Romanesque buildings are the scenes of daily life or mundane events such as musicians playing instruments, acrobats performing stunts, people dancing. Also, scenes representing the several economical activities of that period like peasants planting crops, farm animals (cows, sheep, goats, horses, etc.), as well as the social medieval hierarchy displaying knights, bishops and peasants each performing specific tasks according to their social positions.

Capitals details

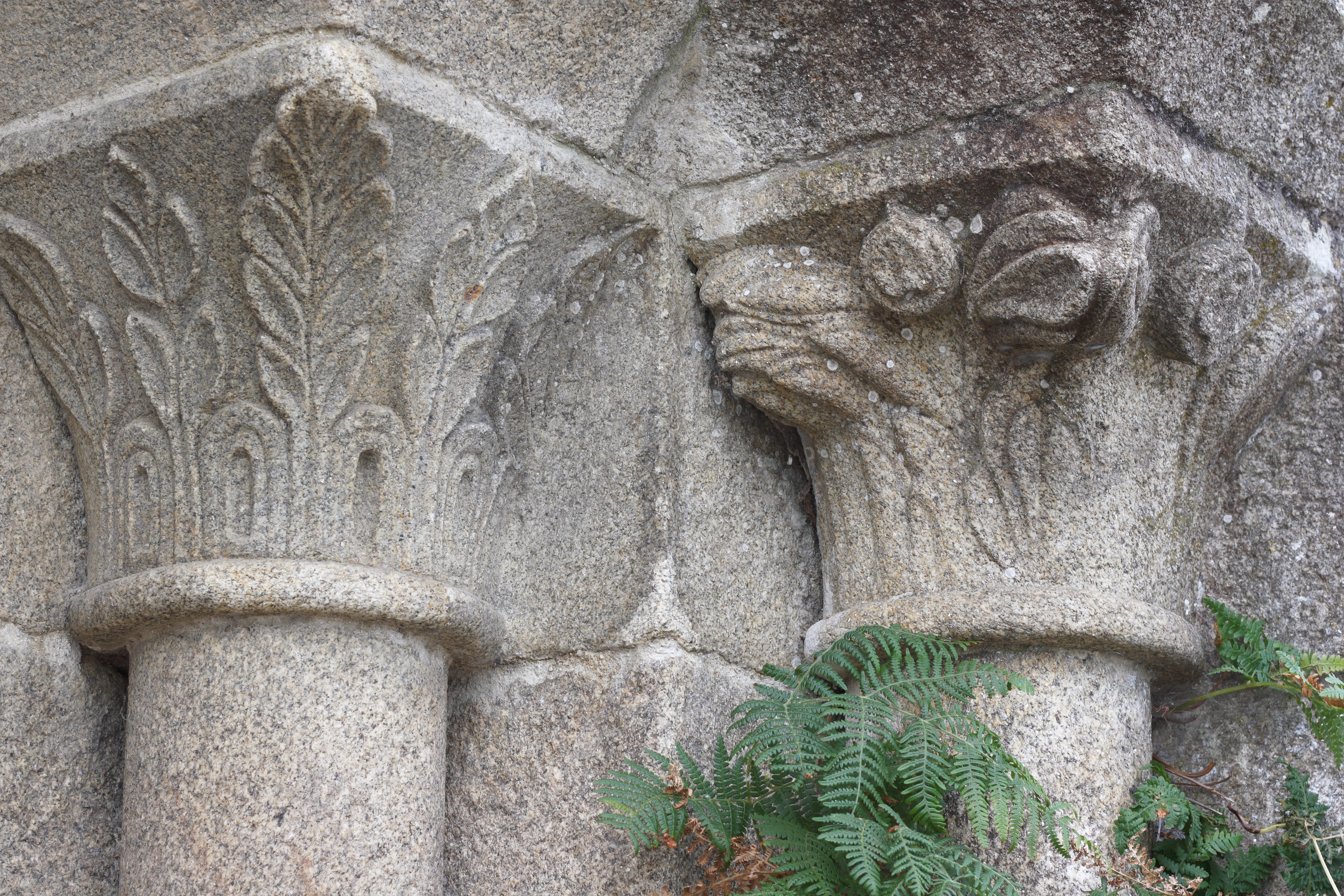
Vegetalist motifs at Monastery of São Salvador de Paderne.

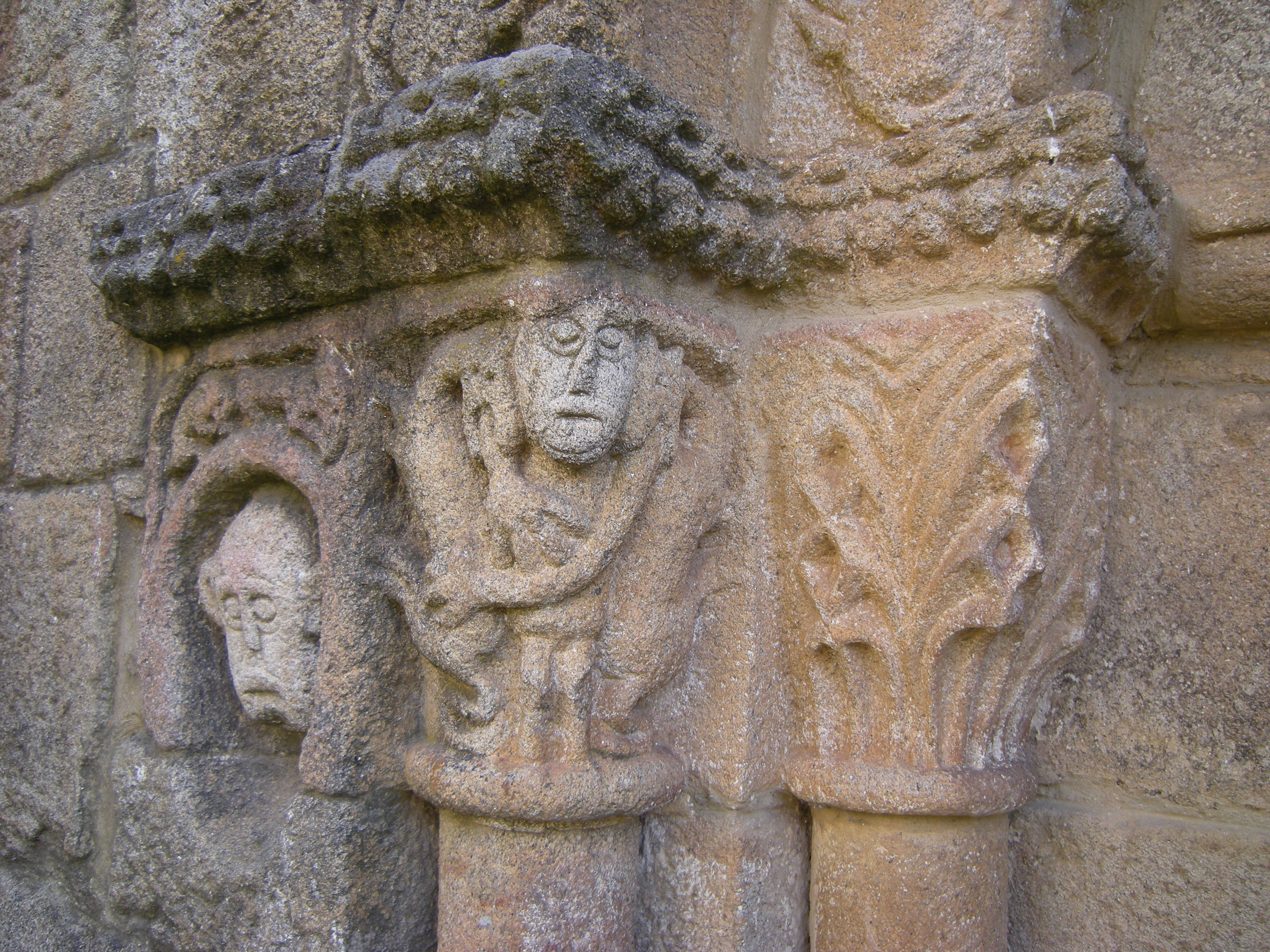
Anthropomorphic figures in the capitals at Chapel of Granjinha.

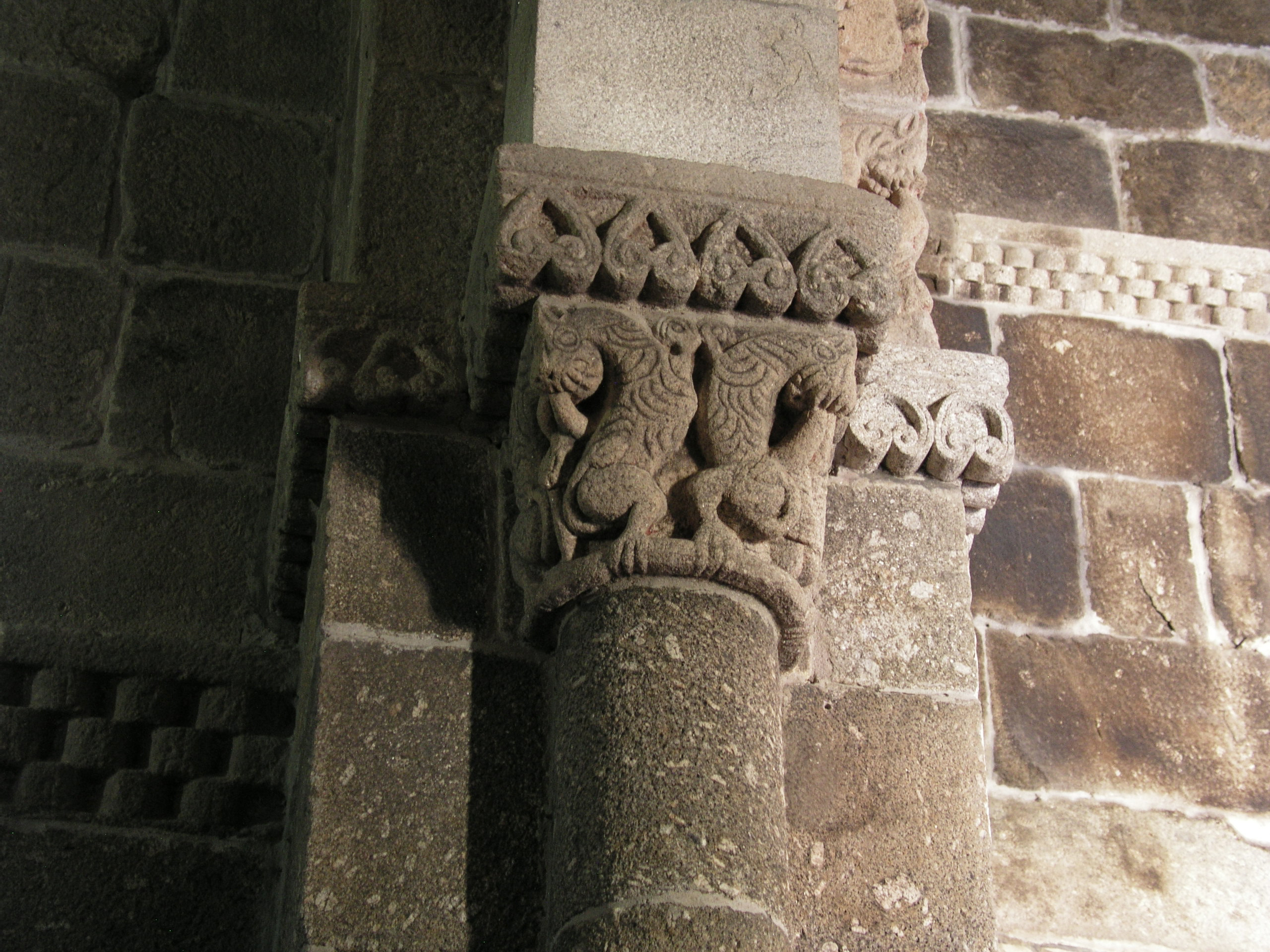
Capital at Church of Bravães with dragons.

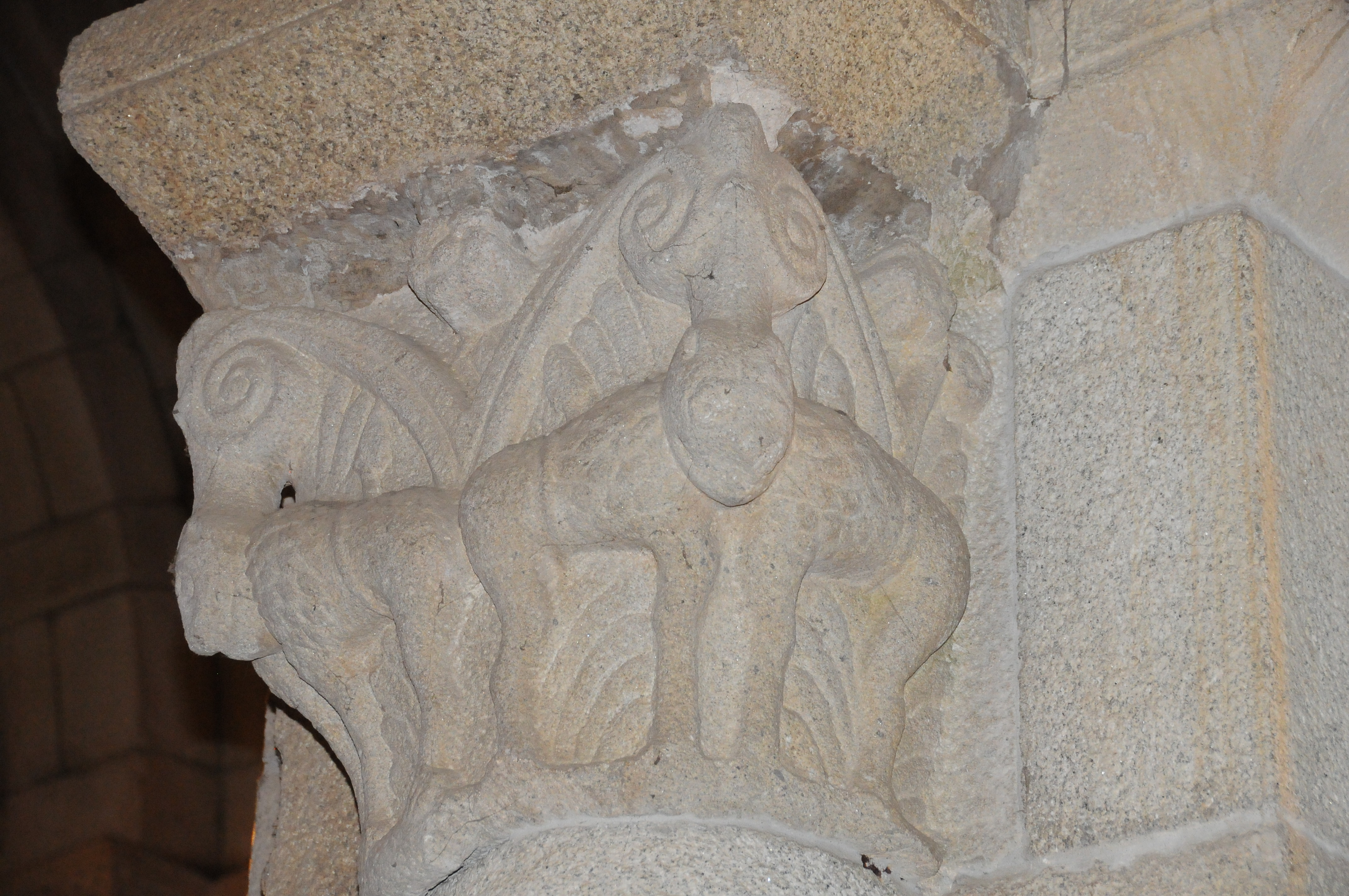
At São Pedro de Rates Monastery we find capitals with Biblical scenes like the episode of "Daniel and the Lions".

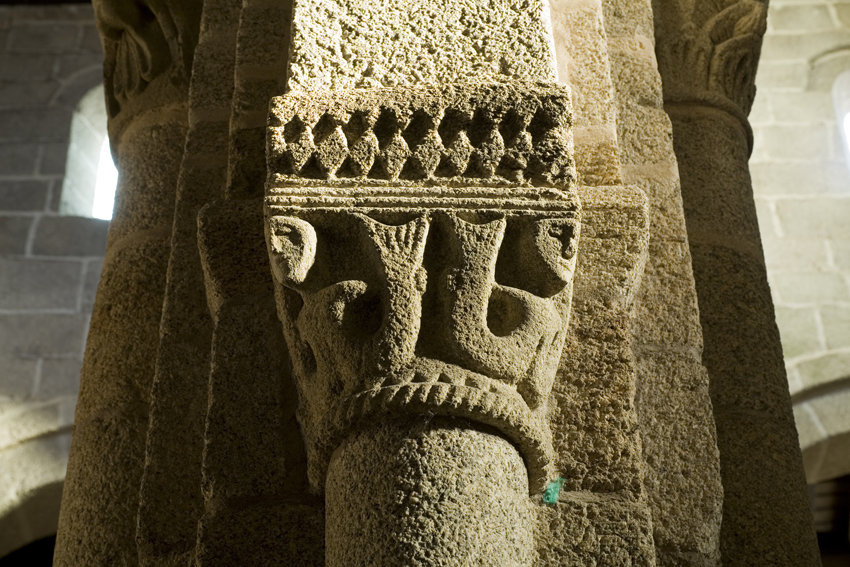
Mermaids carved in a capital at Travanca Monastery.

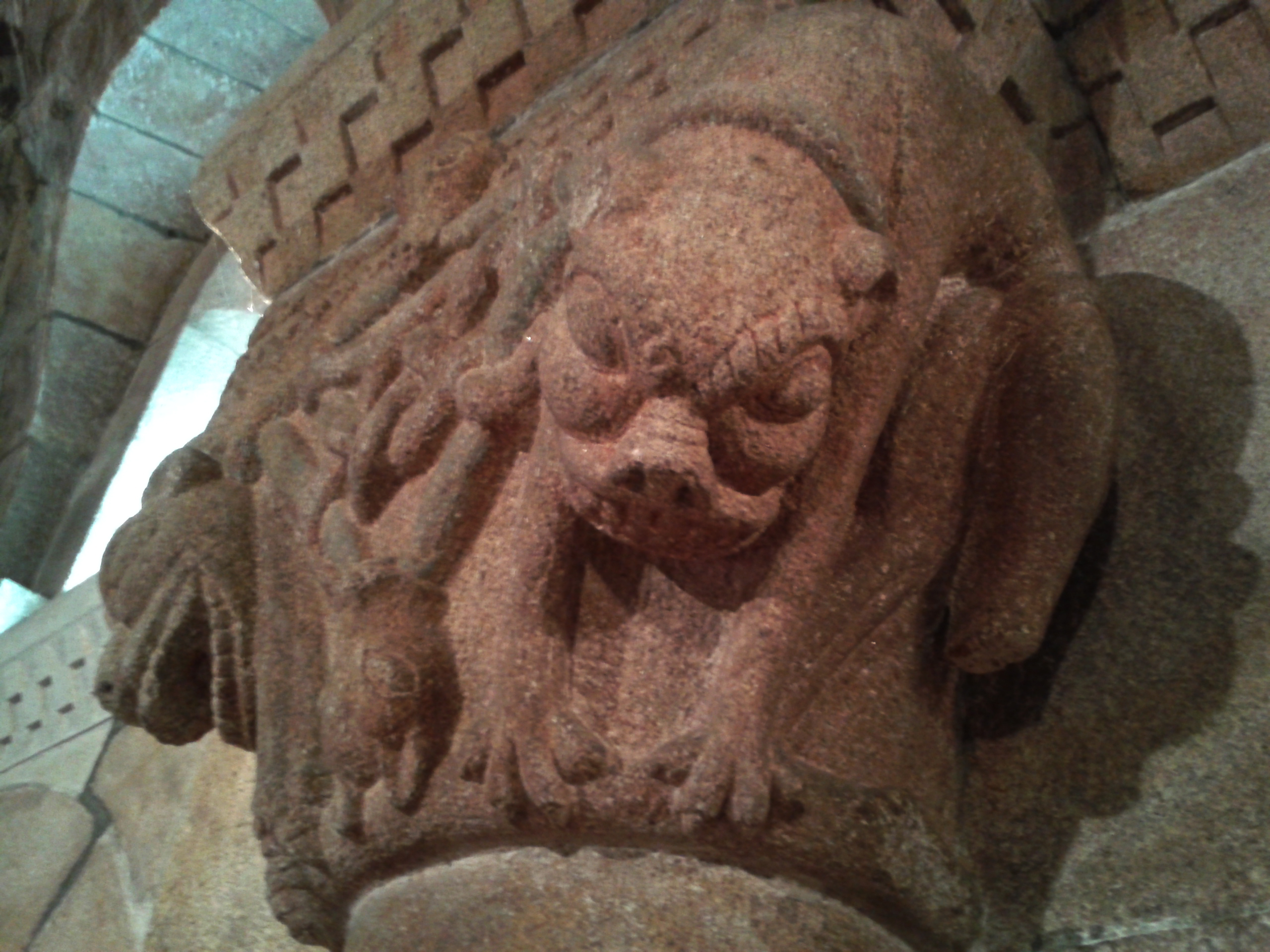
Beasts at São Cristóvão de Rio Mau Church.

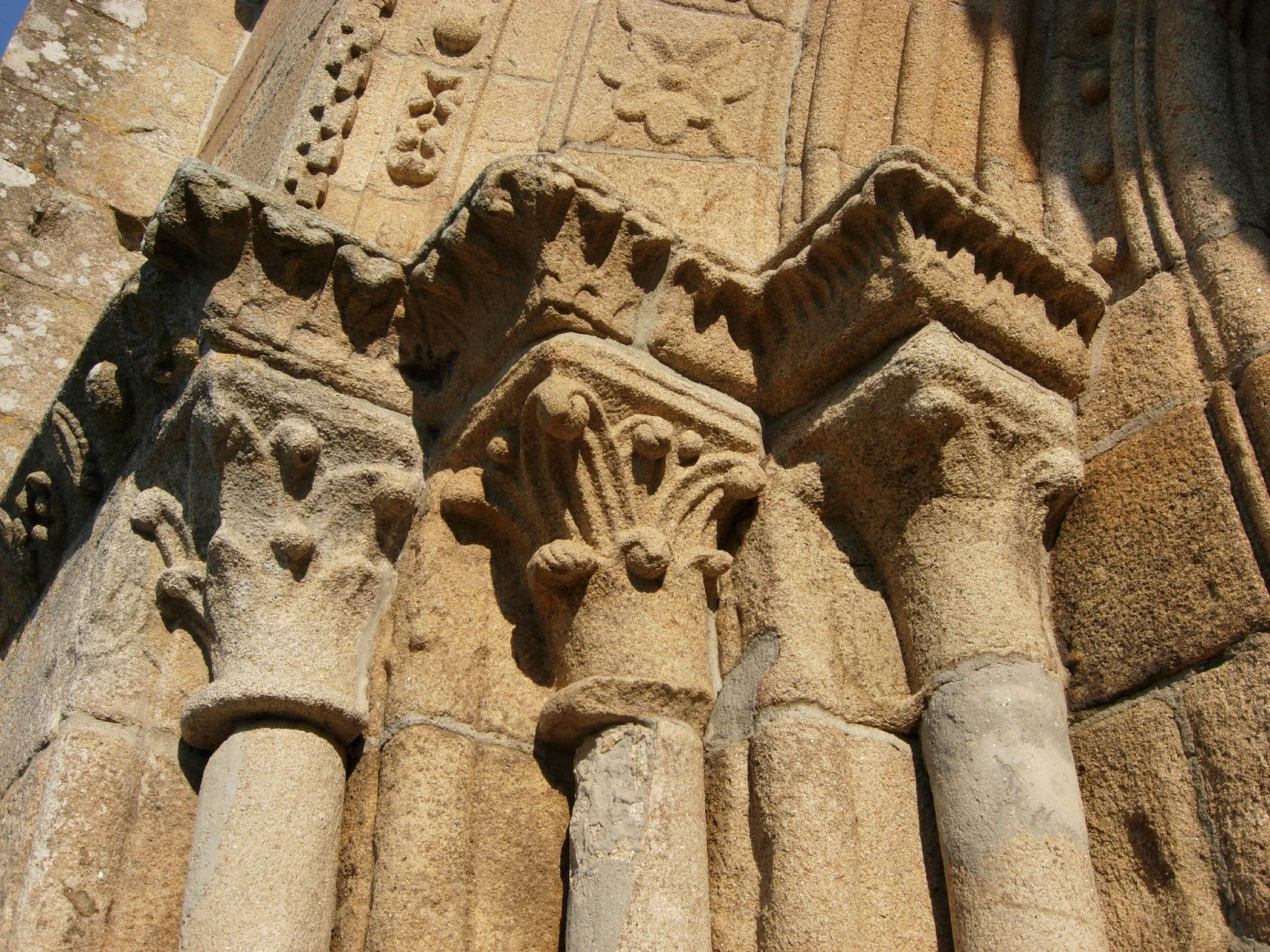
Vegetalist capitals at the chapel of Nossa Senhora da Orada.

=== Corbels and Modillions ===
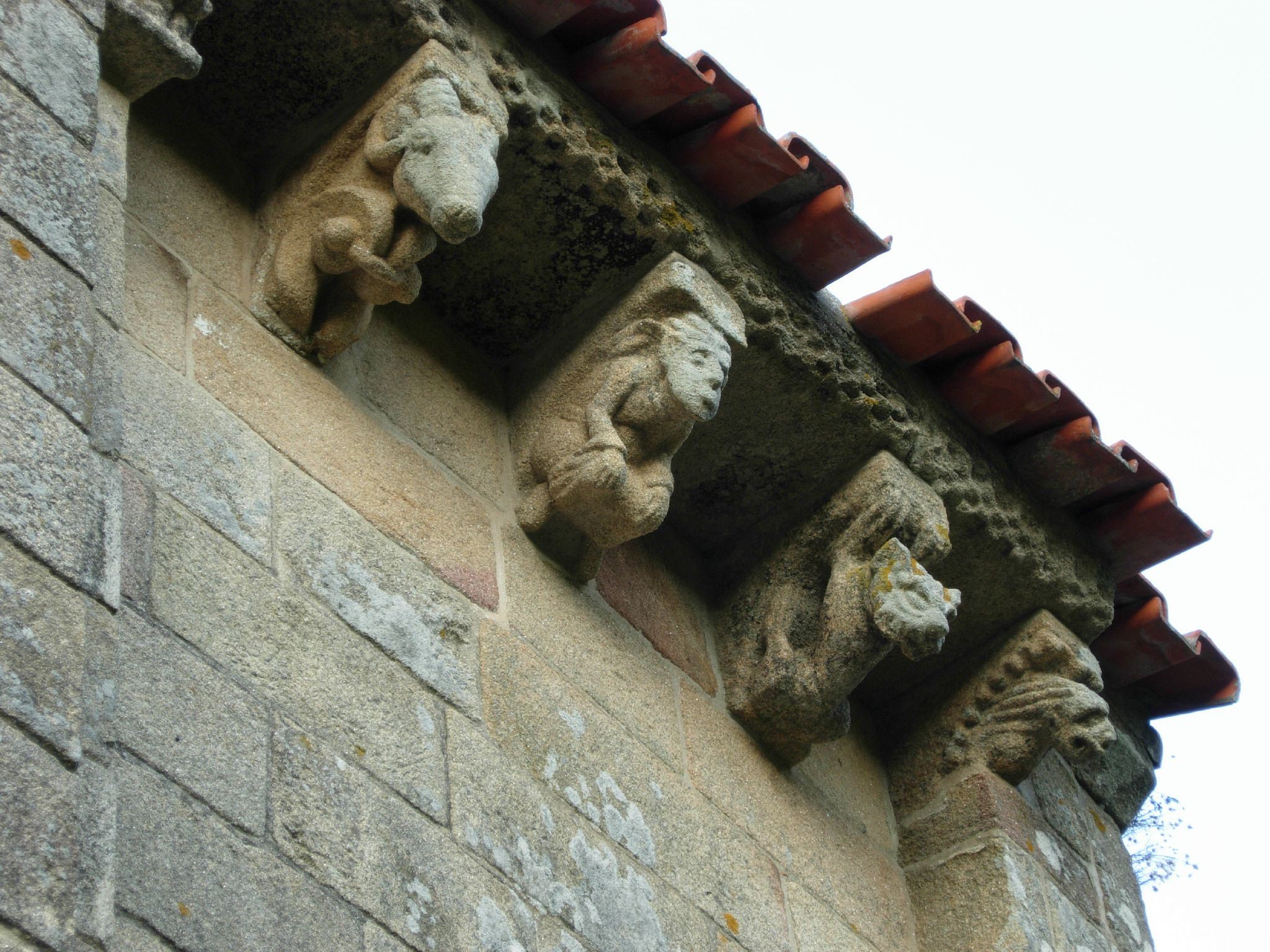
A corbel table with humans, animals and beasts carved in the modillions. Sanfins de Friestas Church.

In Romanesque architecture a corbel is a structural piece of stone jutting from a wall to carry a superincumbent weight, a type of bracket. The technique of corbelling, where rows of corbels deeply keyed inside a wall support a projecting wall or parapet, has been used since Neolithic times. A modillion is an ornate bracket, a corbel, underneath a cornice and supporting it, more elaborate than dentils (literally translated as small teeth), they were carved classically under a Corinthian or a Composite cornice, but may support any type of eaves cornice.

Corbels in Portuguese Romanesque buildings often have an elaborately carved appearance with stylised heads of humans, animals and imaginary "beasts", or a wide range of motifs, sometimes end with a point apparently growing into the wall, or forming a knot, and often are supported by angels and other figures. In later periods the carved foliage and other ornaments used on corbels resembled those used in the capitals of columns.

Another particular feature of Romanesque buildings are corbel tables, a projecting moulded string course supported by a range of corbels. Sometimes these corbels carry a small arcade under the string course, the arches of which are pointed and trefoiled. As a rule corbel tables carries the gutter, but the arcaded corbel table was also used as a decoration to subdivide the storeys and break up the wall surface. In some buildings corbels will form a moulding, and above a plain piece of projecting wall forming a parapet.

Corbel details

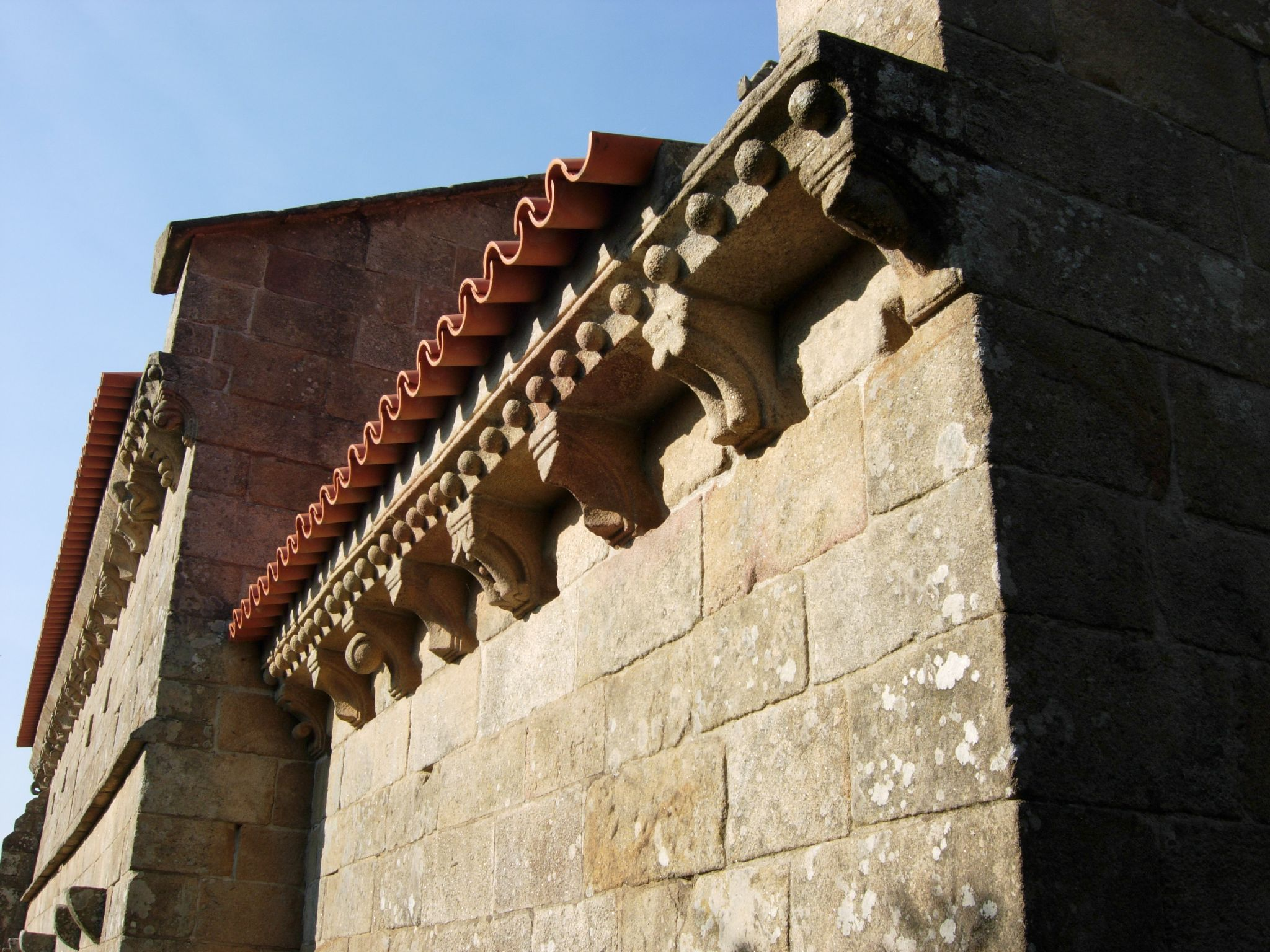
Naturalistic and esoterical shapes in corbels at Milieu Church.

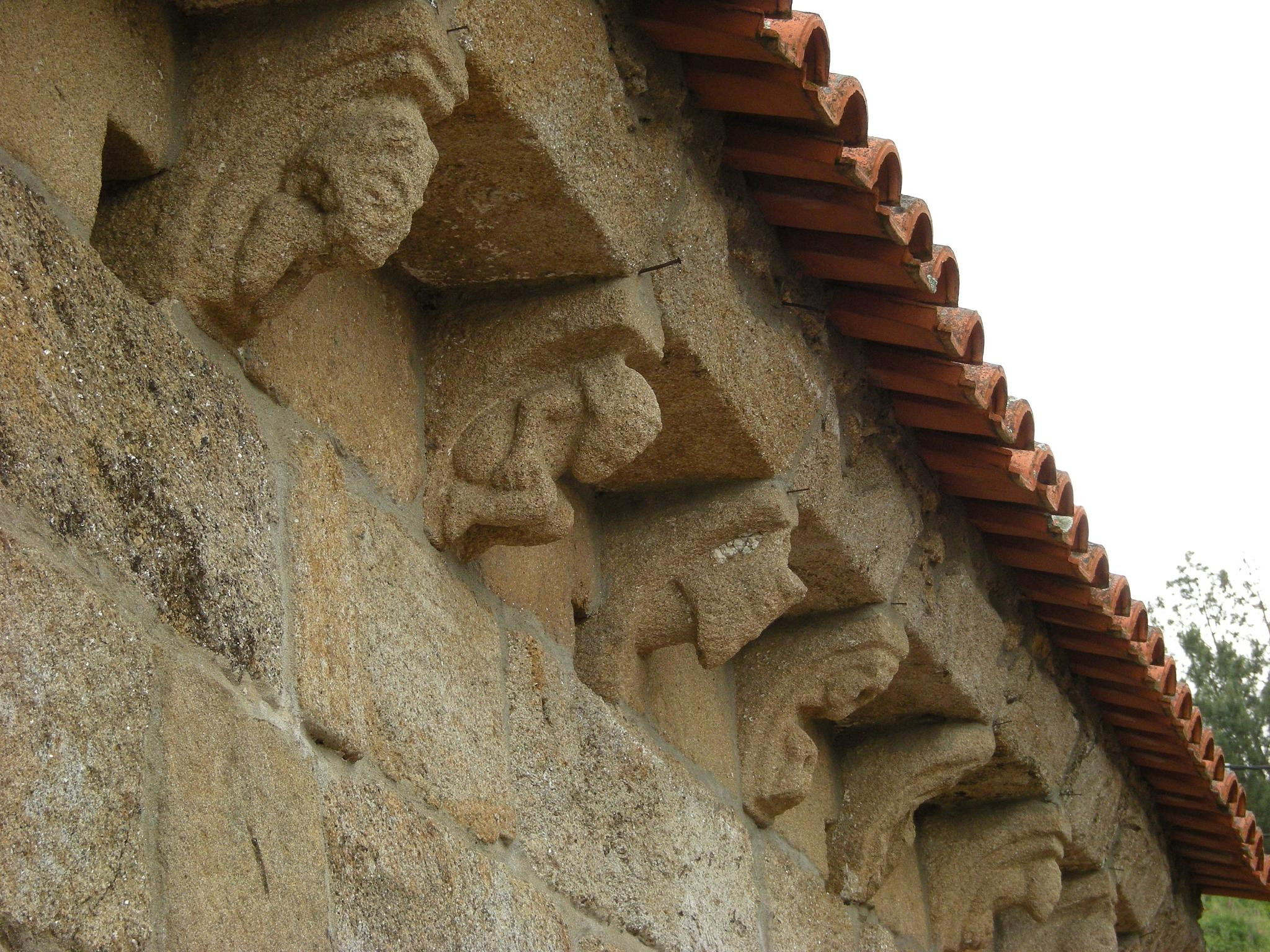
Humans and beasts at Chaviães Church.

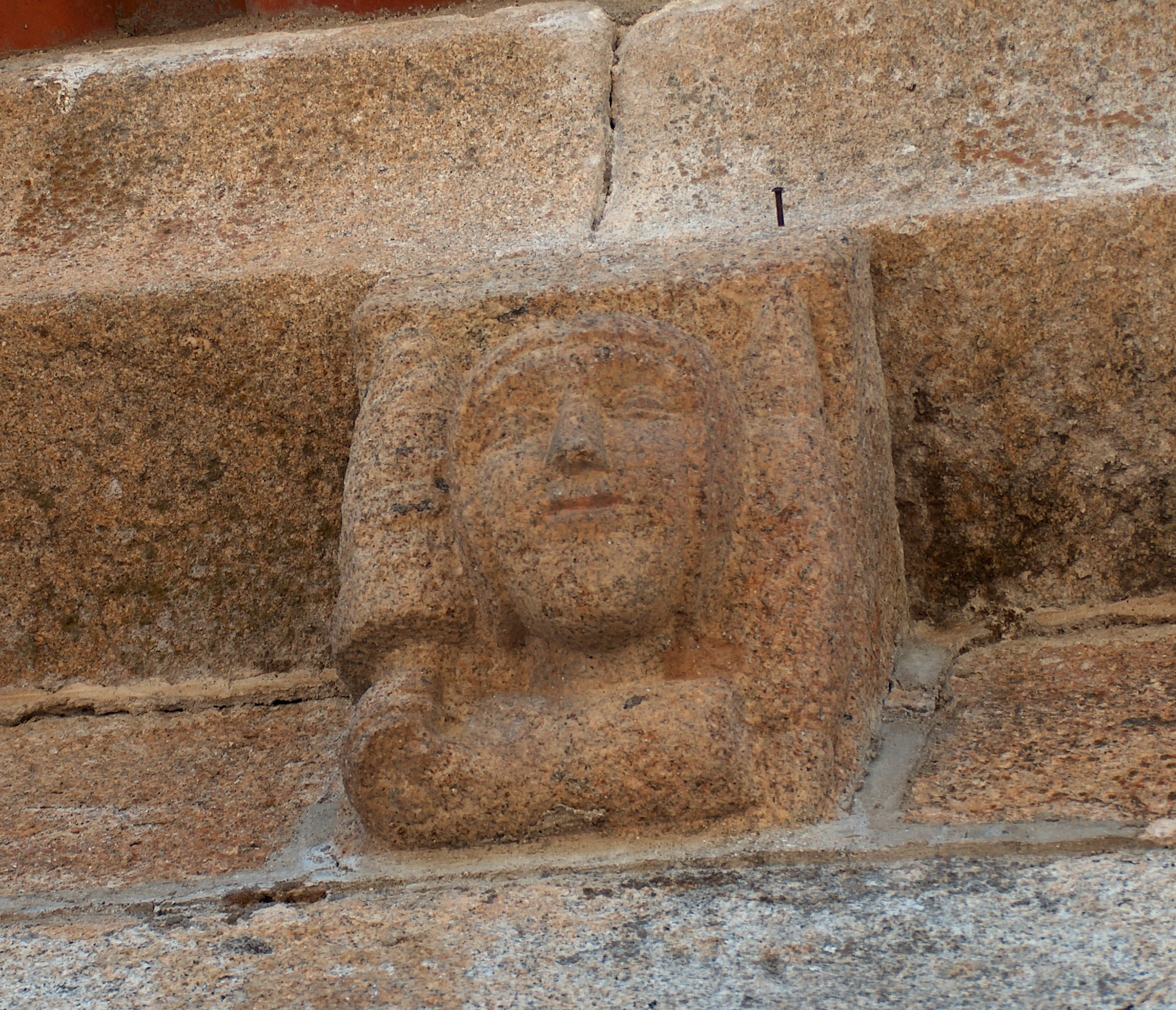
Church of Mouçós with human faces on its modillions.

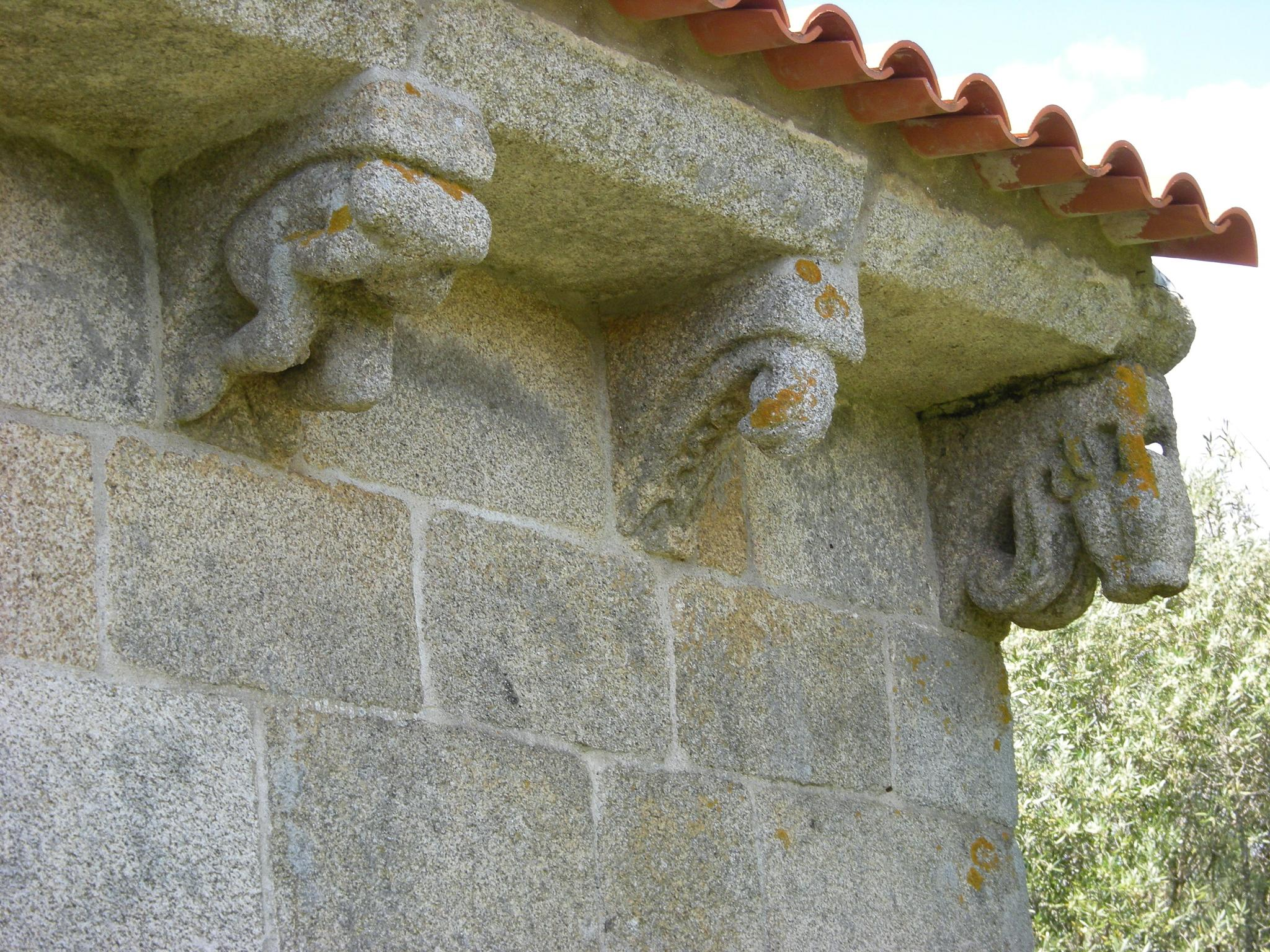
Church of São Cláudio de Nogueira corbels.

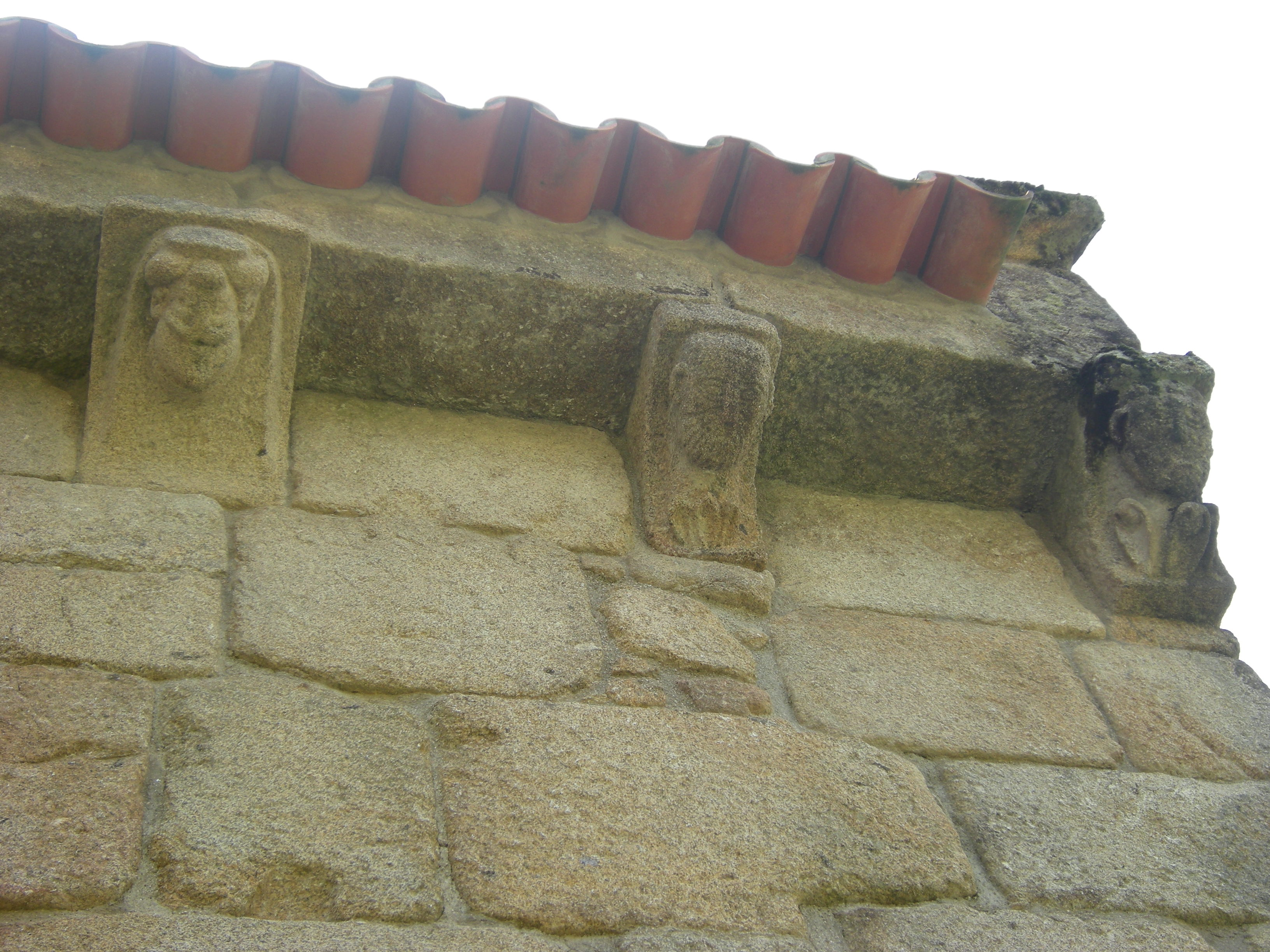
Modillions at Moreira de Lima Church.

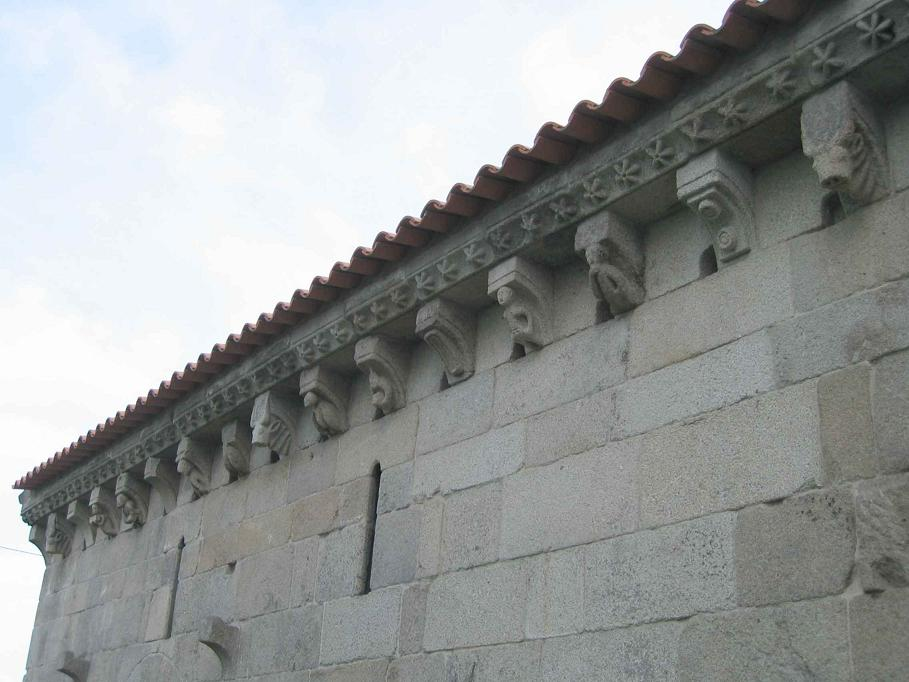
A complete row of modillions at a corbel table in the Church of São Gens de Boelhe.

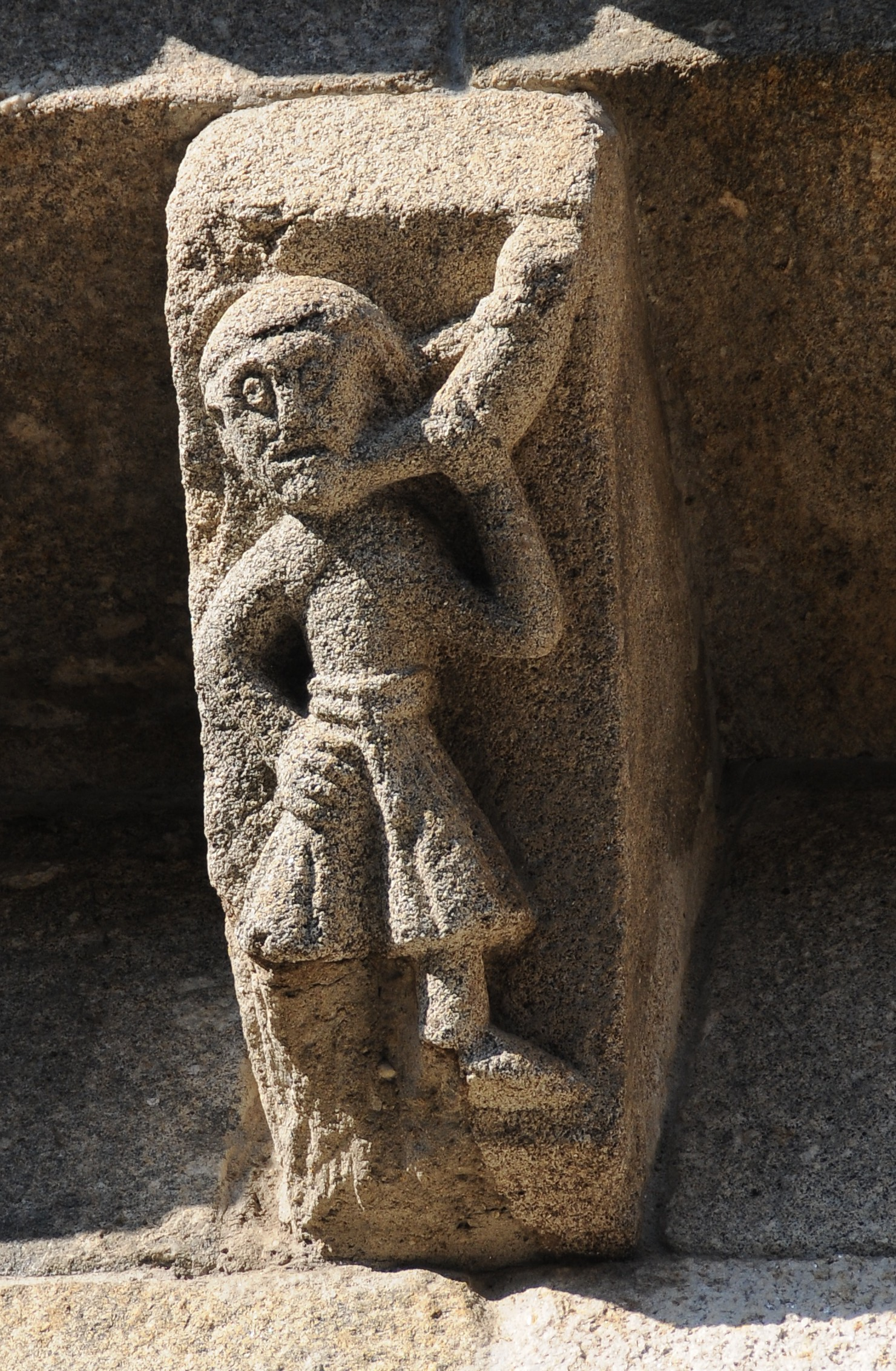
The "horn blower" at Braga Cathedral.

=== Apses (East ends) and apsidoles ===
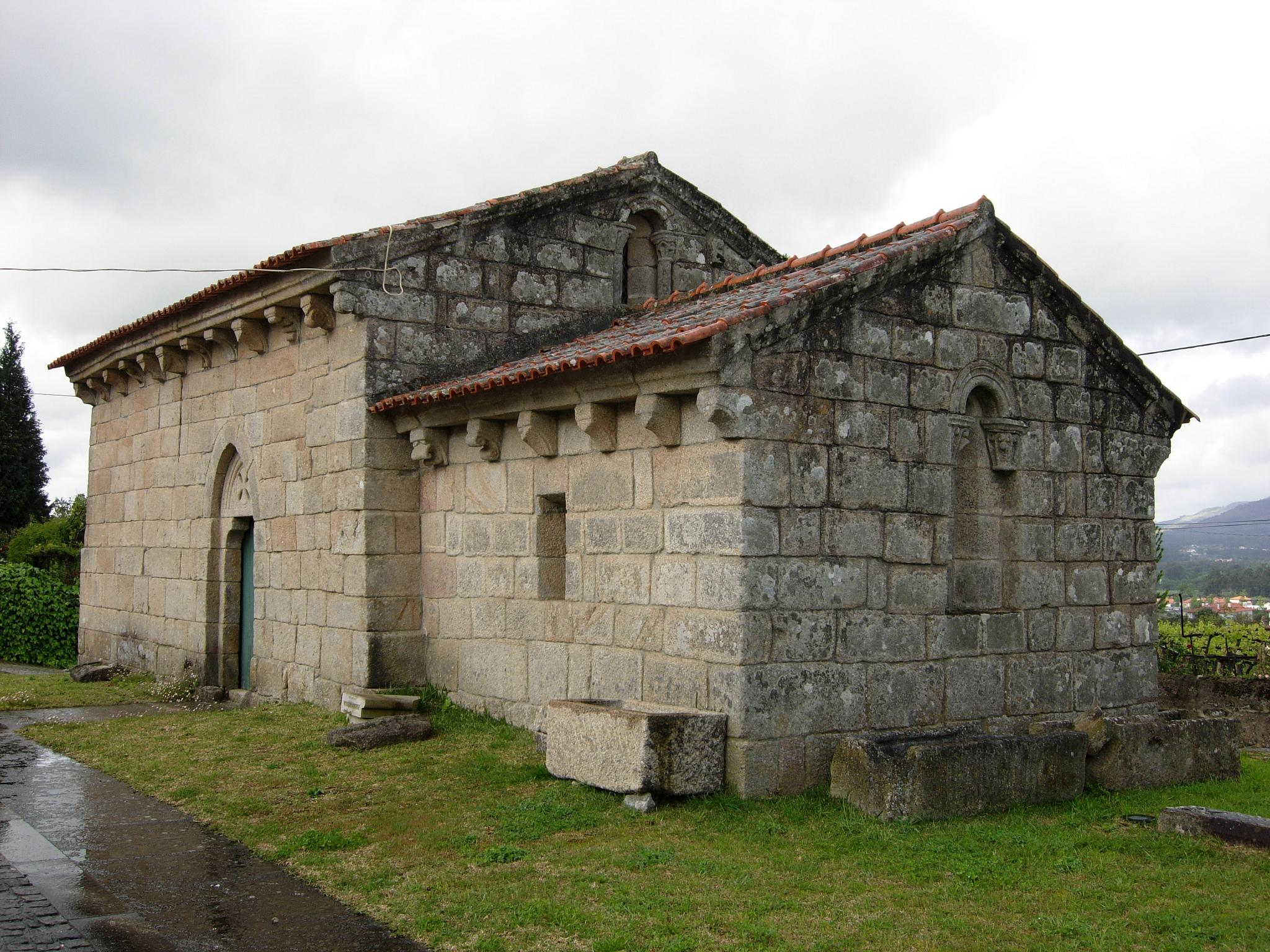
Simple square east end on the'Chapel of Santo Abdão.

One of the most striking features of a Romanesque church is its apse or "east-end", a recess covered with a hemispherical vault or semi-dome, also known as an Exedra, applied to a semi-circular or polygonal termination to the choir or aisles of a church at the liturgical east end (where the altar is), regardless of the shape of the roof, which may be flat, sloping, domed, or hemispherical. Apses and apsidoles can be either semi-circular, with or without a high chancel surrounded by an ambulatory, or a square end from which an apse is projected. Apsidoles can also be found whenever the main altar is surrounded by lateral chapels.

Churches in Portugal have long since followed the Pre-Romanesque kind of simple square-shaped apses typical of Visigothic and Mozarabic periods where east ends reflected the common structural plan of single-aisled churches as the main altar is separated from the nave by a transept or is just the extension of it. This style continued to be popular through the Romanesque and well into Gothic period. Fully Romanesque semi-circular apses started being more widespread in the regions between Douro and Minho in the second quarter of the 12th century (1125–1150), coming from the center region of Coimbra that was more open to foreign novelties as stated above. This kind of so-called "French style" semi-circular apses and apsidoles became more frequent not only in single nave churches, on which case there are no apsidoles, but particularly in three-aisled churches and monasteries built in the second half of the 12th century and during the 13th century.

Apses and apsidoles

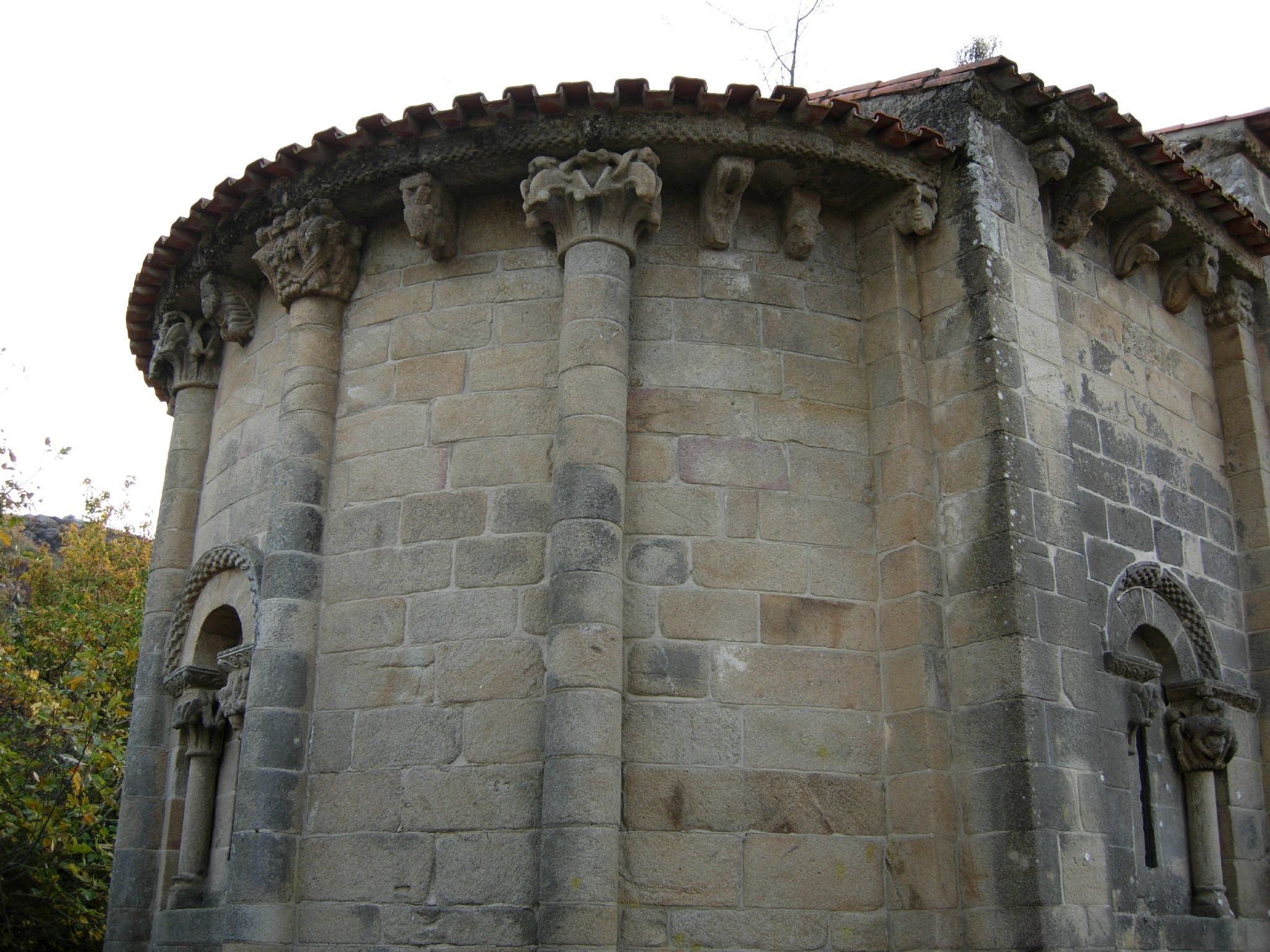
Round apse at Sanfins de Friestas Church.

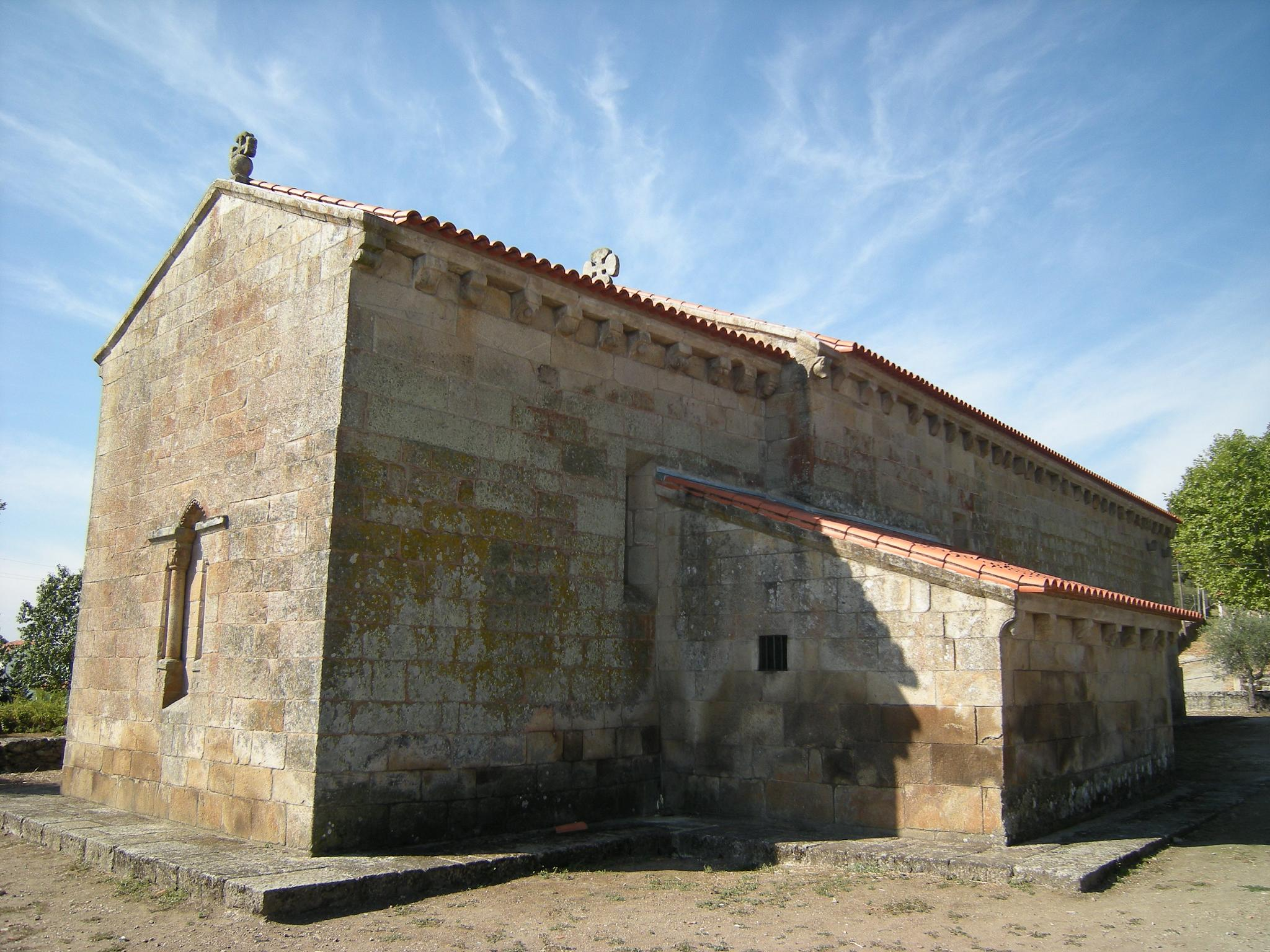
The Church of Azinheira has a square east end with small apsidoles.

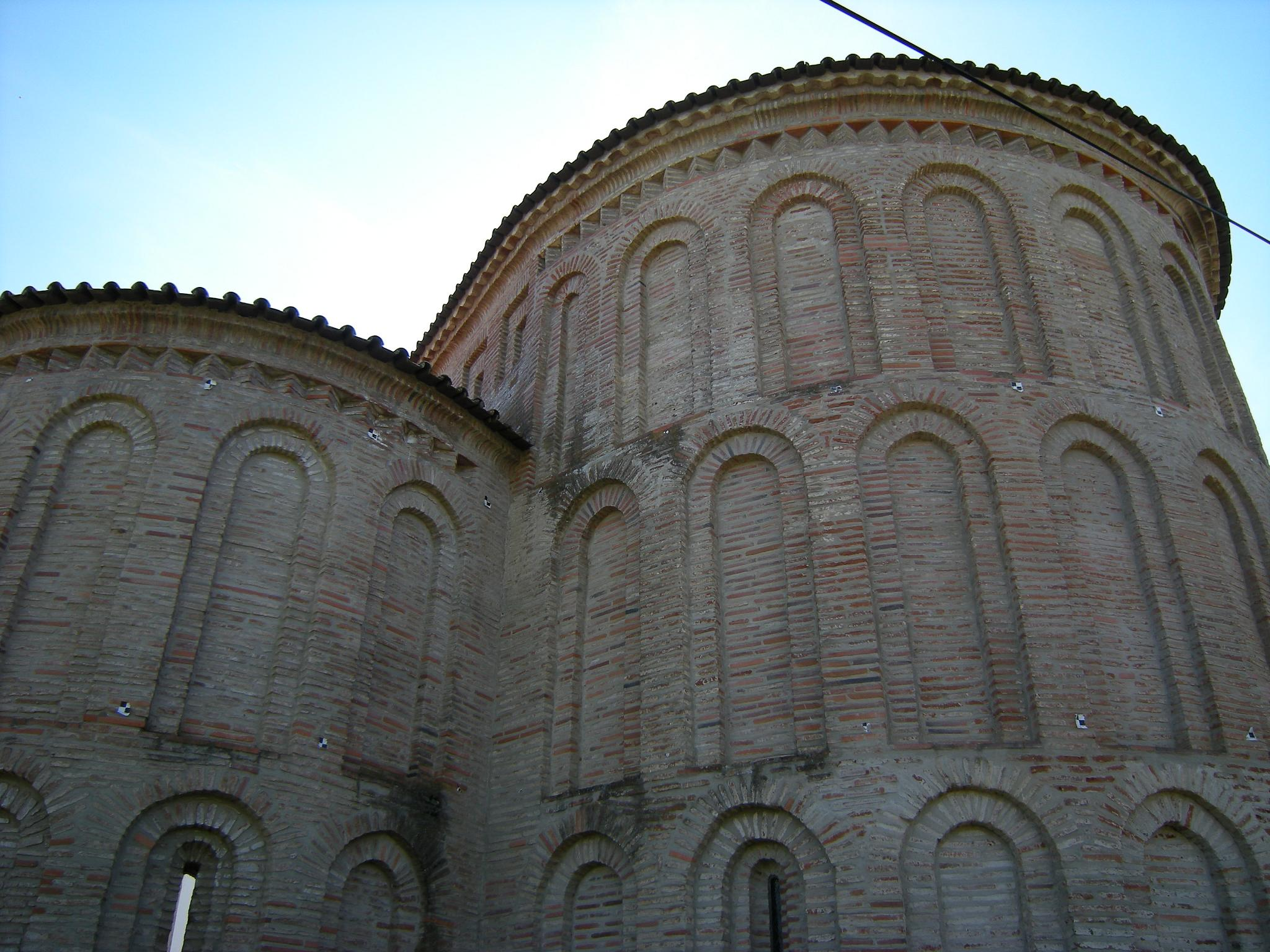
Monastery of Castro de Avelãs with its unique brick layered apse influenced by Asturian-Leonese art.

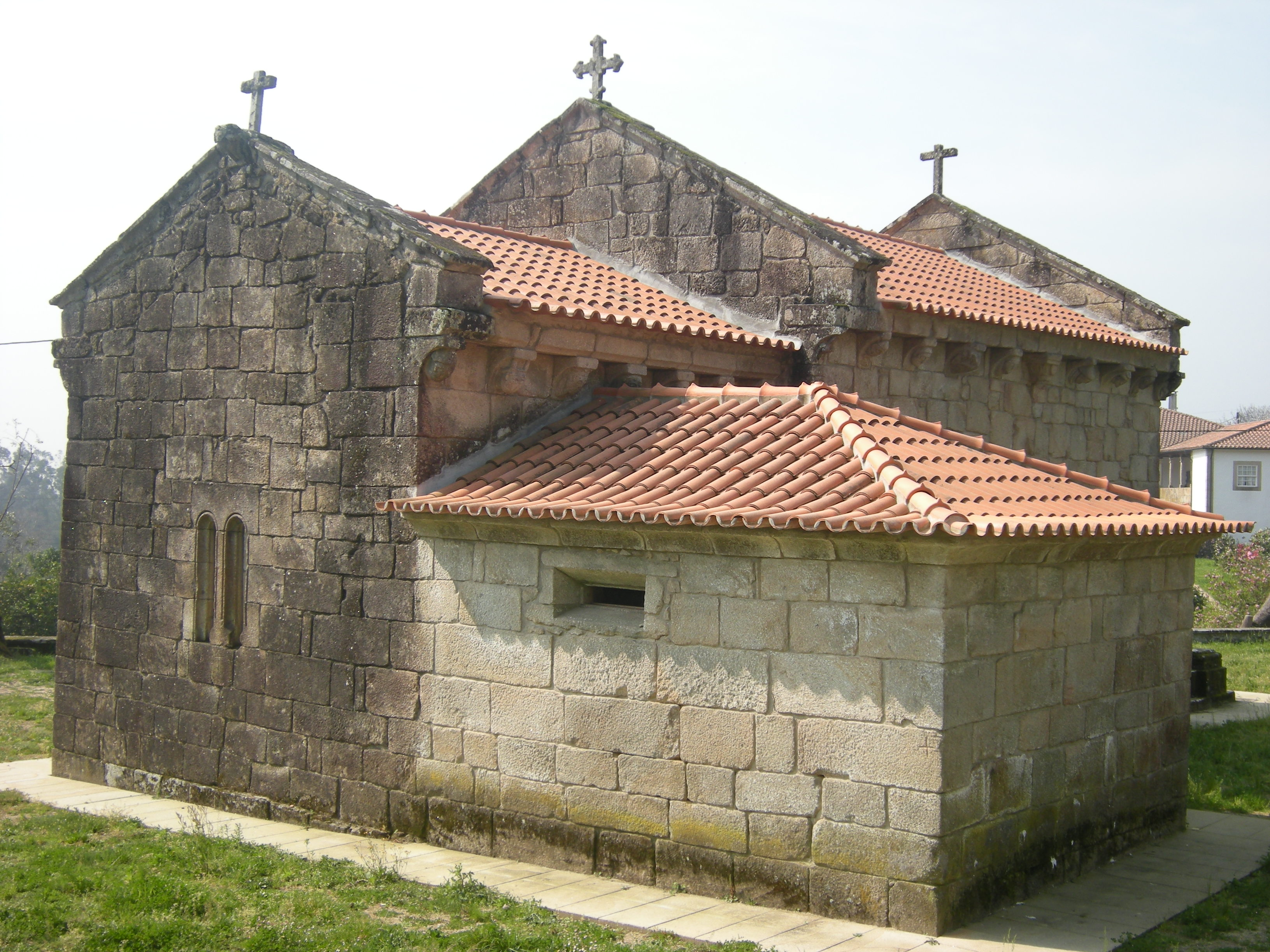
The apse of Moreira de Lima Church features a square apse with only one lateral apsidole.

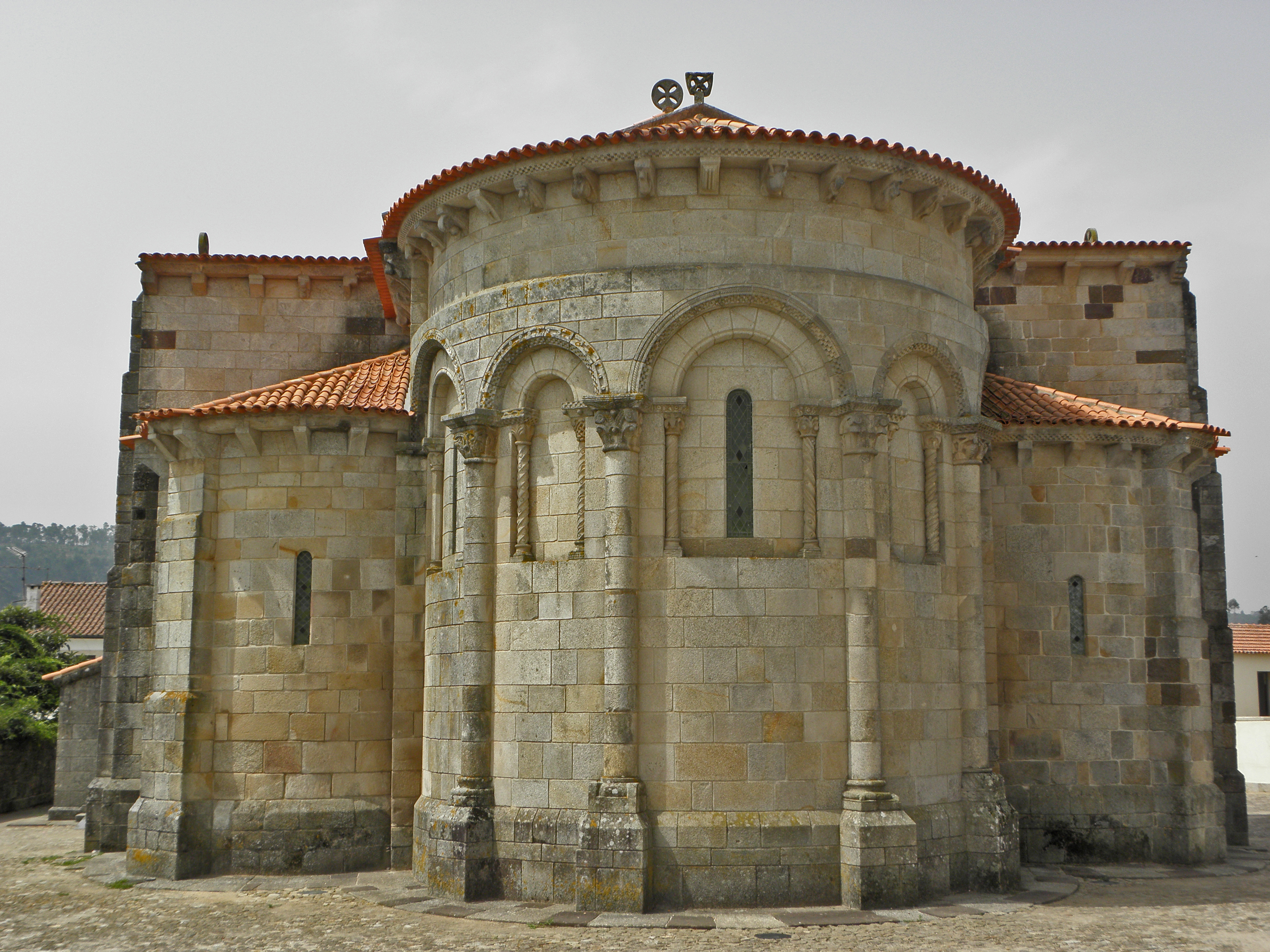
Round shaped apse and apsidoles at Monastery of São Pedro de Rates, an influence from Cluny monks that brought the "French style" to Portugal.

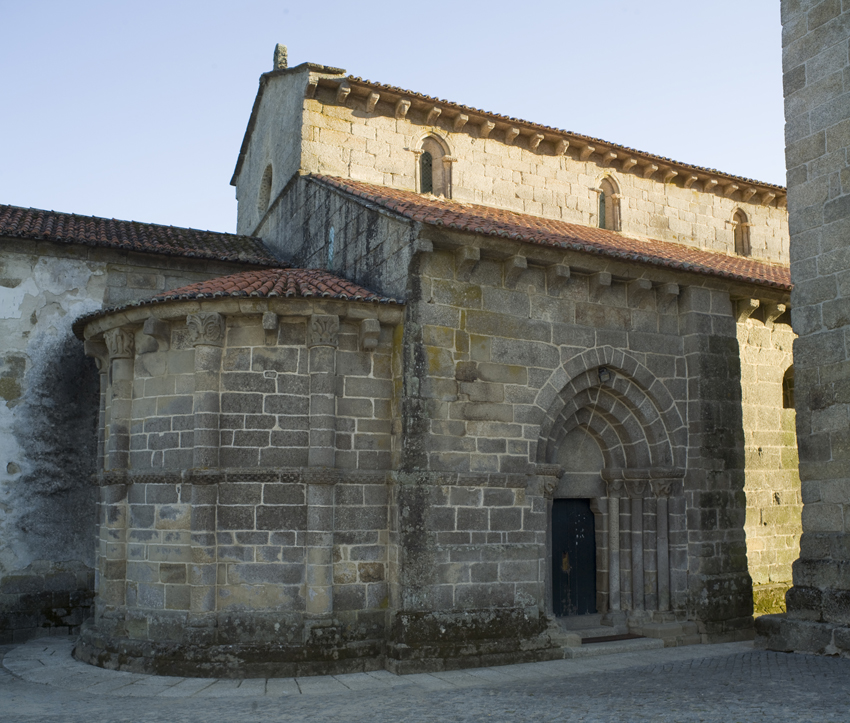
Travanca Monastery has double round apsidoles surrounding a square-shape apse.

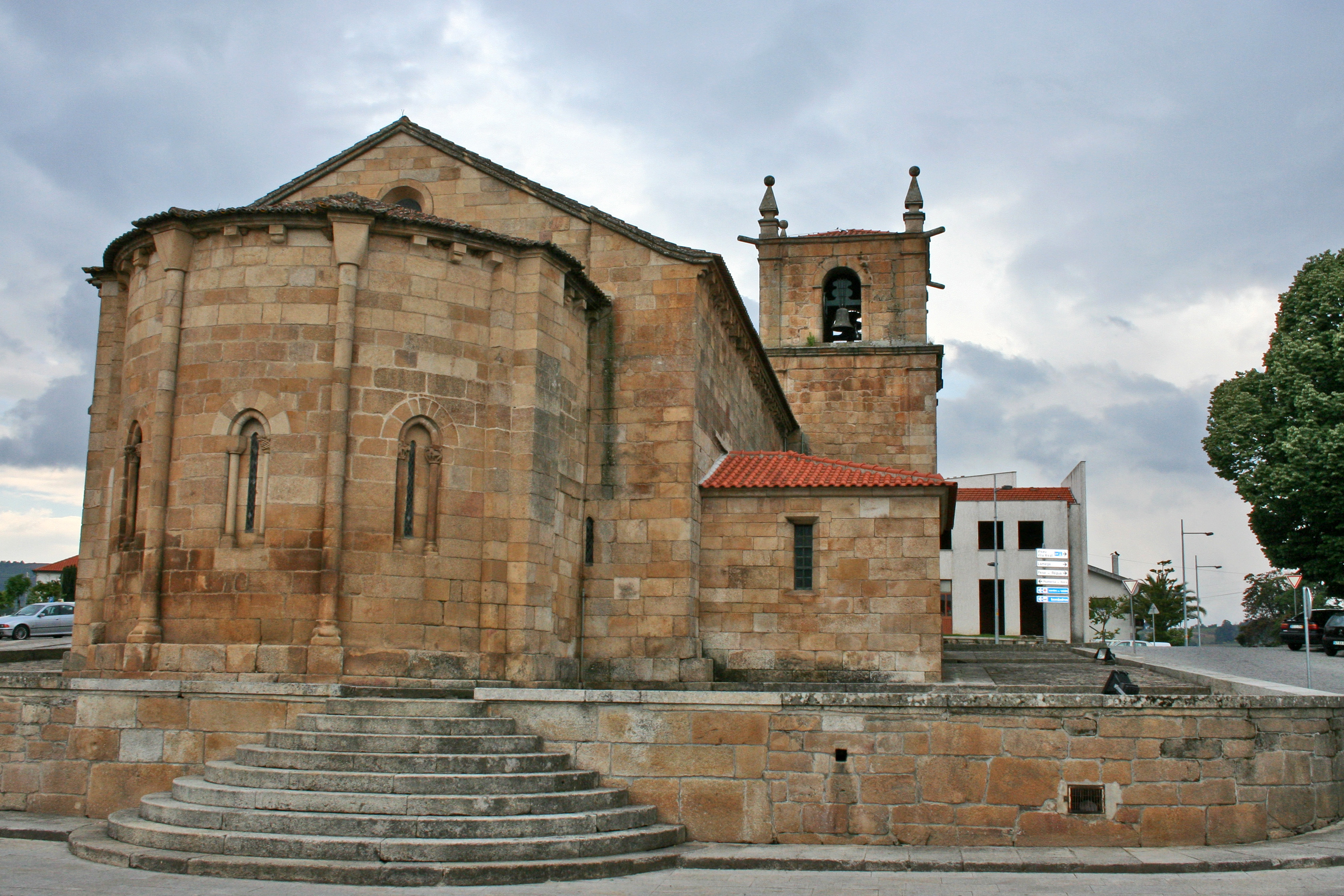
The 12th-century-built Church of Armamar already has a semi-circular apse.

=== Cloisters ===
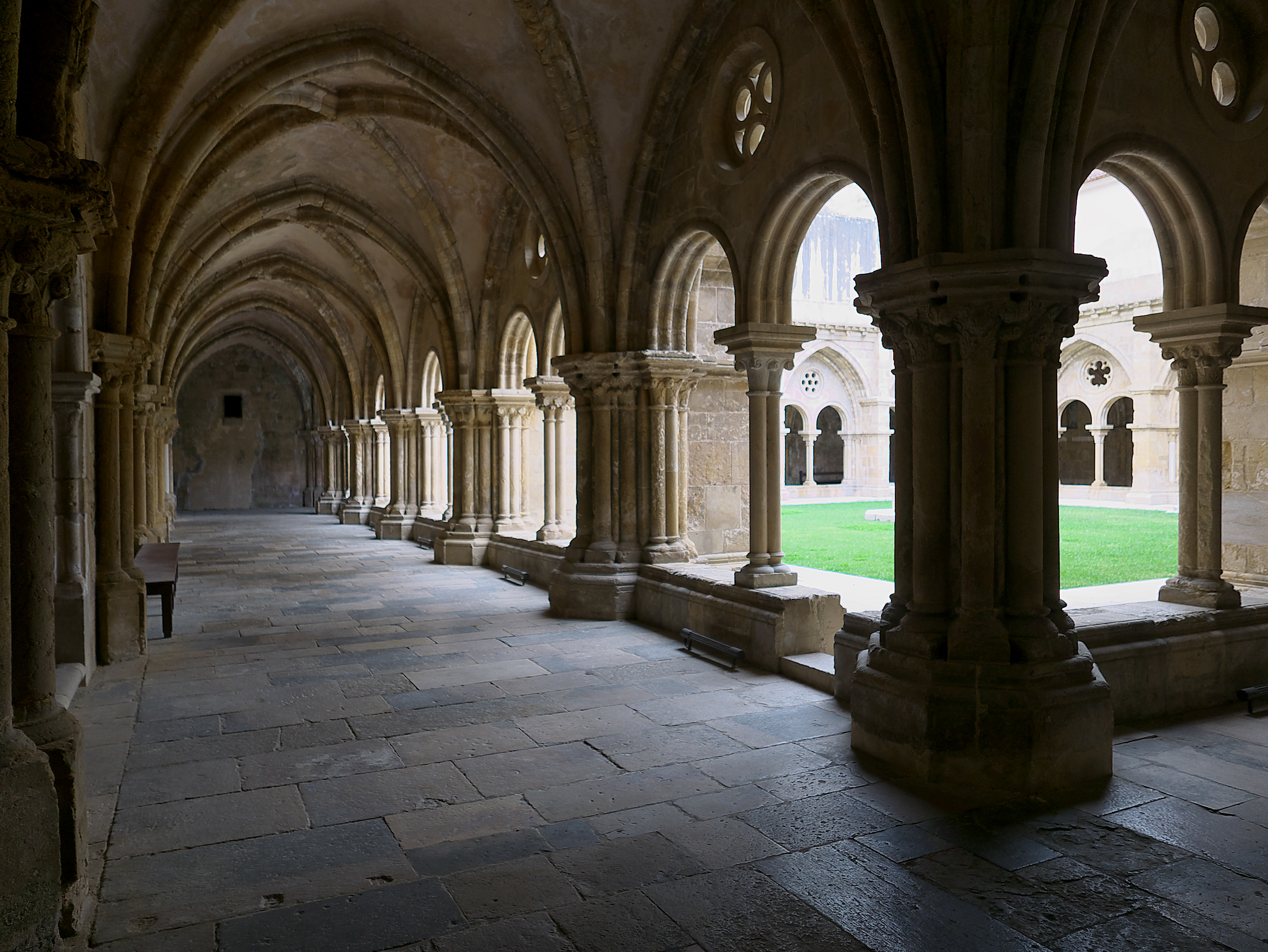
Cloister of Coimbra Cathedral, arcades and columns are Romanesque but its roof already presents a ribbed vault.

A cloister (from Latin claustrum, "enclosure") is a covered walk, open gallery, or open arcade running along the walls of buildings and forming a square or garth. The attachment of a cloister to a cathedral or church, commonly against a warm southern flank, usually indicates that it is (or once was) part of a monastic foundation, forming a continuous and solid architectural barrier that effectively separates the world of the monks from that of the serfs and workmen, whose lives and works went on outside and around the cloister.

Although much of the cloisters in Portuguese churches and cathedrals have been extensively remodelled in later centuries, original Romanesque ones still survived, some almost completely preserved, others in various states of ruin. In contrast to their French counterparts, they often have suffered less modern intervention, and as a result, their current state is more likely to reflect their original arrangement and to preserve more fully the character of the visual imagery found there. Most arcades and masonry walls of the cloister carries simple wooden shed roofs as barrel or groin vaulted ceilings weren't common or likely didn't survived into our days. When ribbed vaults were introduced, the columns were articulated by multiple applied shafts, with smaller arcades in the openings to the garth.

Cloisters provided special accommodation for the activities that took place within it: stone benches were used for reading, books were sometimes stored in cupboards or armoires built into the walls. In addition, the cloister often contained a fountain or well, where the monks could wash and draw water to drink. The single, double, and even triple and quadruple capitals of 12th-century cloisters' columns were carved with foliate forms derived from the Classical period, such as vine scrolls and acanthus leaves, real and imaginary animals in combat or in heraldic positions, secular images such as musicians, entertainers, hunters, saints' lives and biblical events. Piers bore narrative scenes or relief figures of apostles or saints.

Cloisters

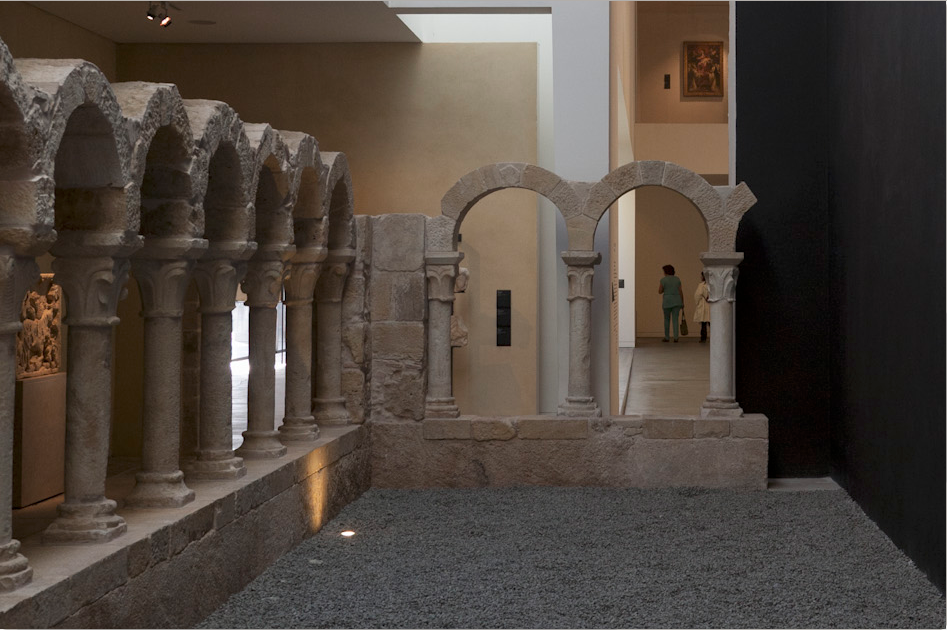
10th-century cloisters at National Museum Machado de Castro.

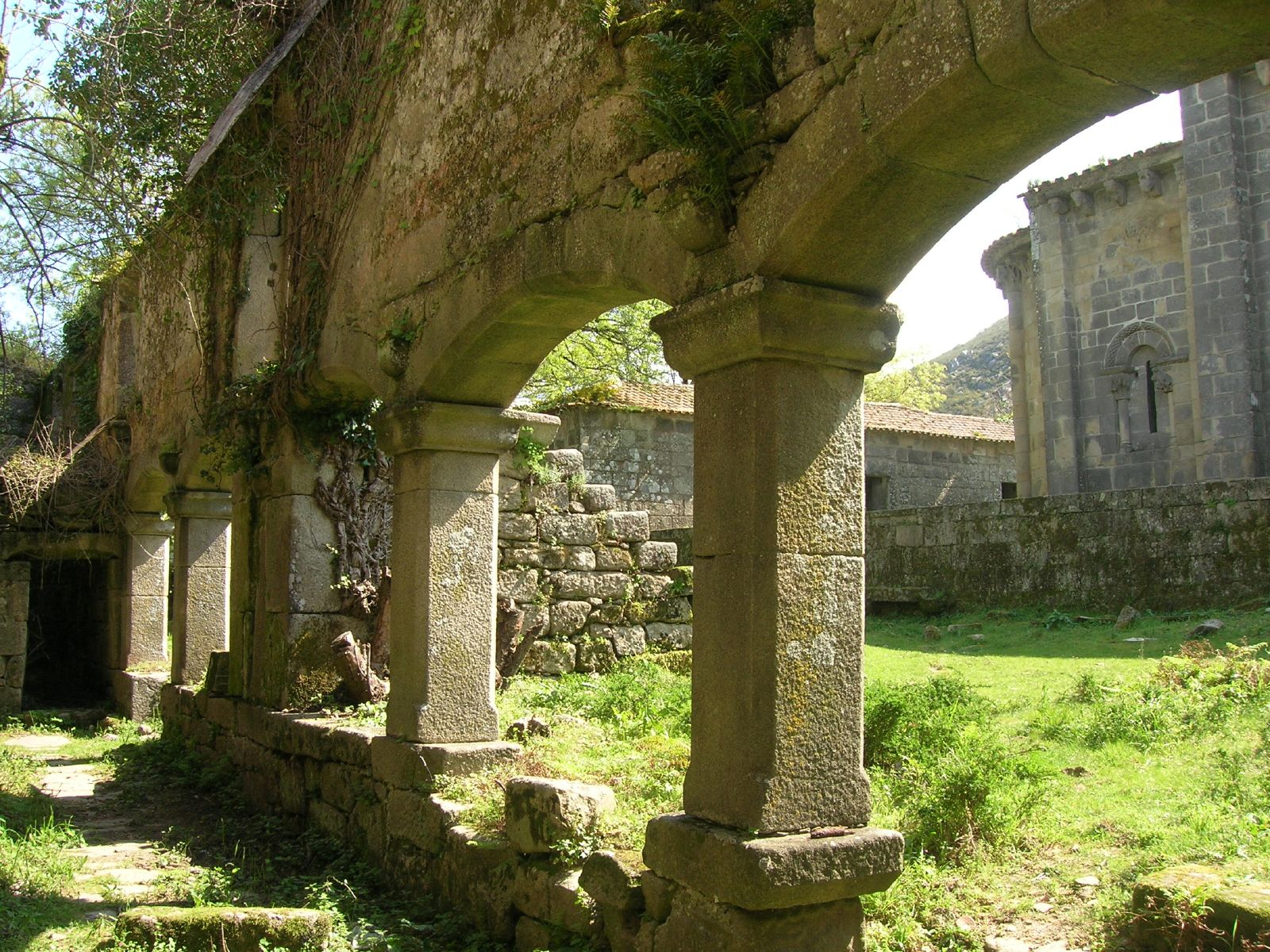
Ruined cloister of Sanfins de Friestas Church, with short arcades.

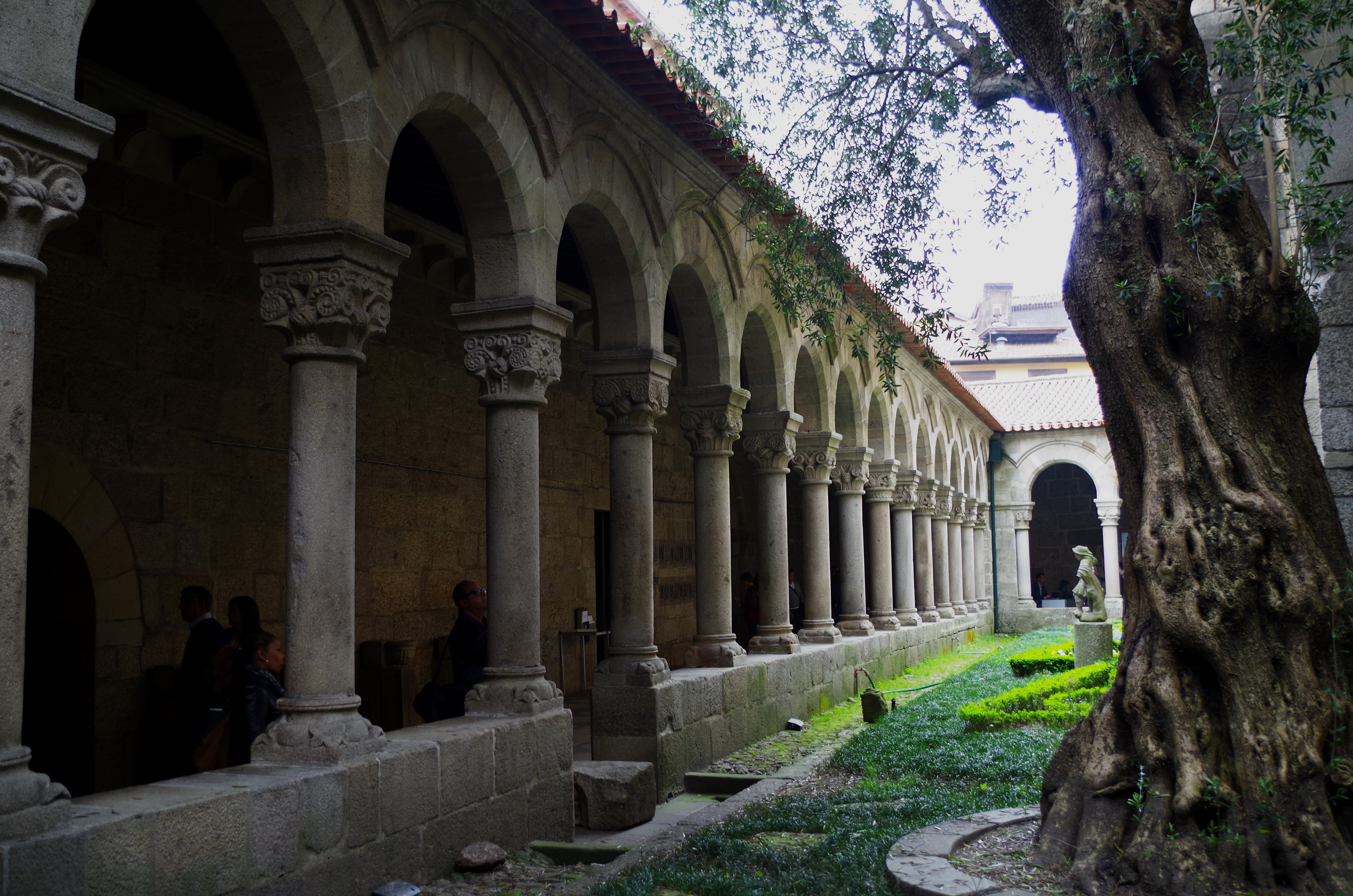
Oliveira Church in Guimarães and its magnificent cloister with intricate capital carvings.

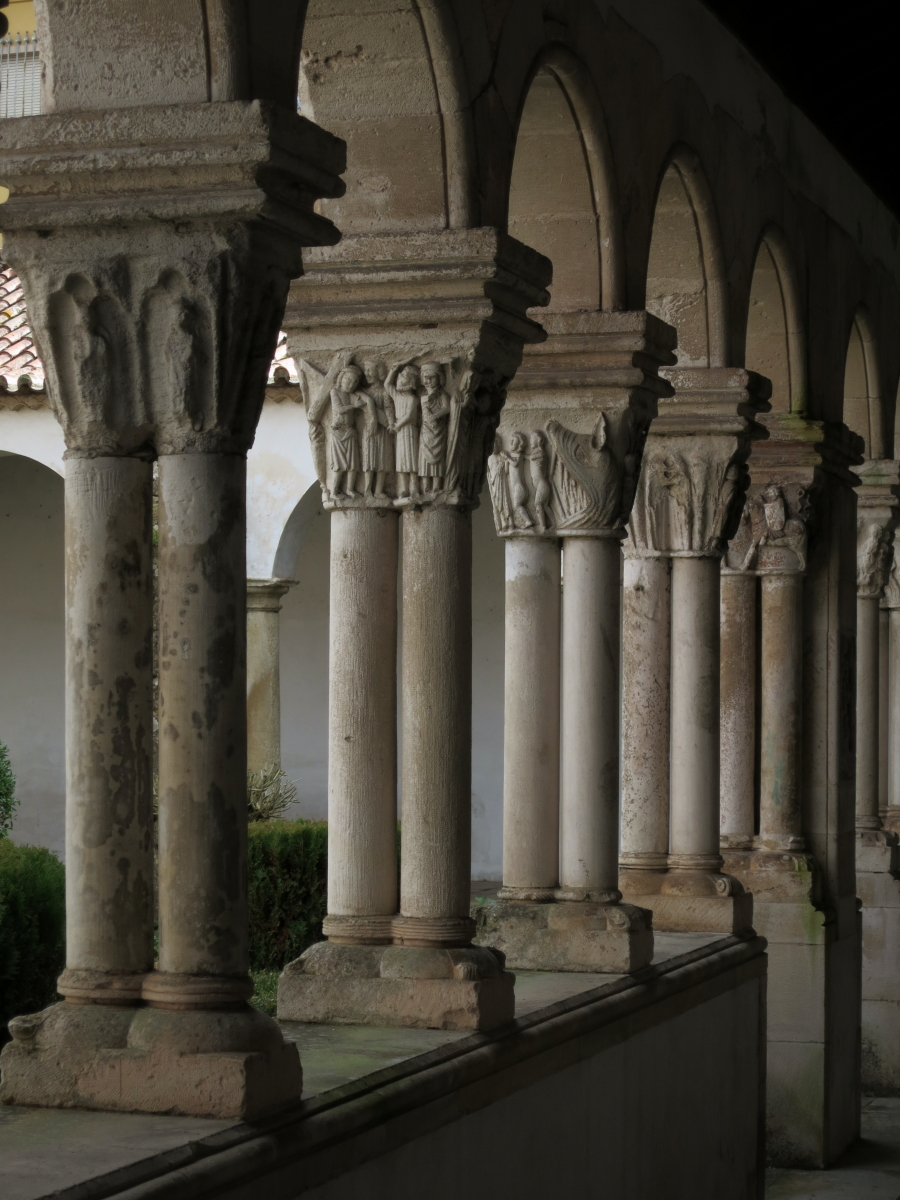
Capitals with human and animal representations at Monastery of Celas.

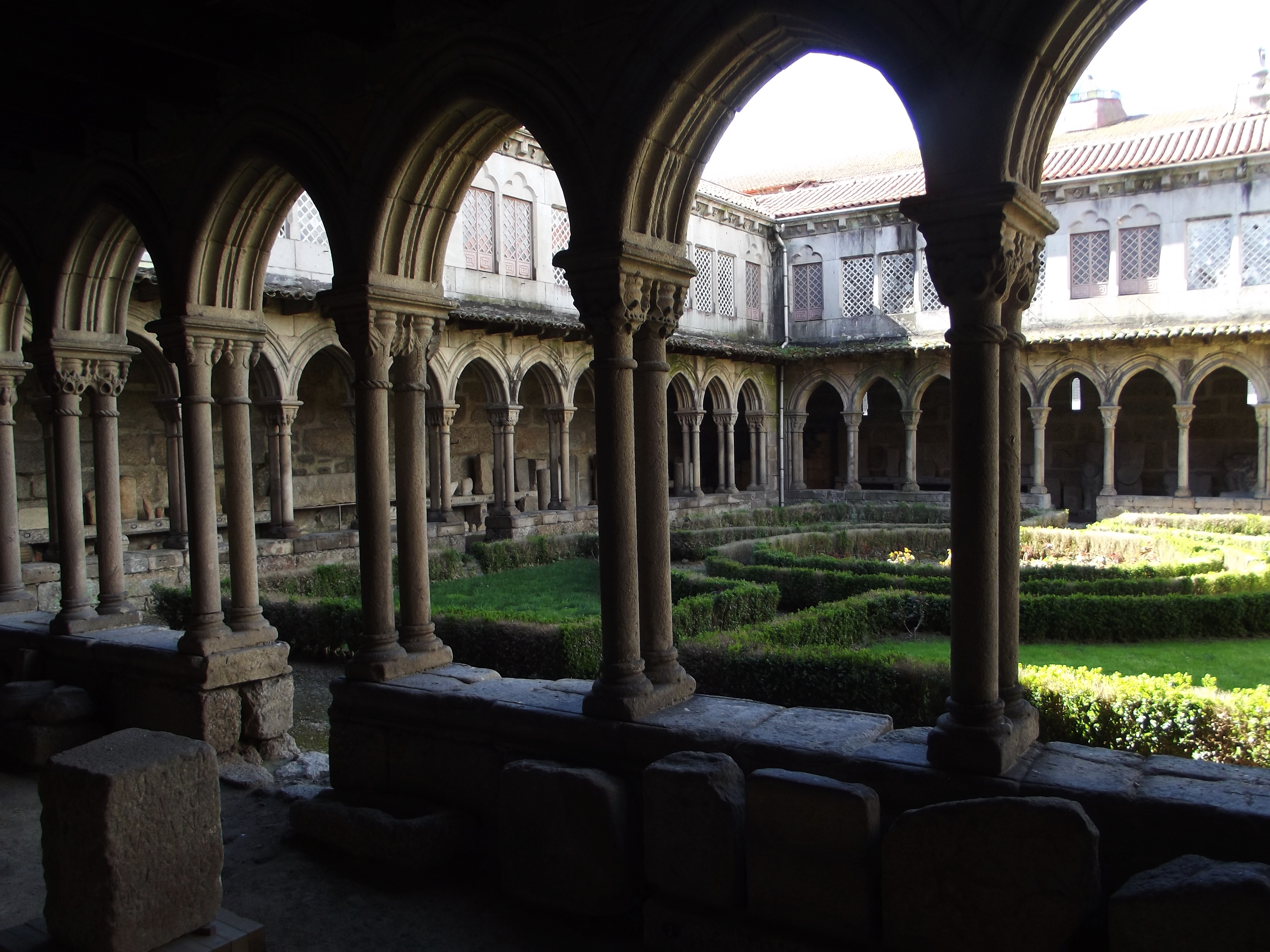
Monastery of Santo Tirso has a double-collonatted cloister.

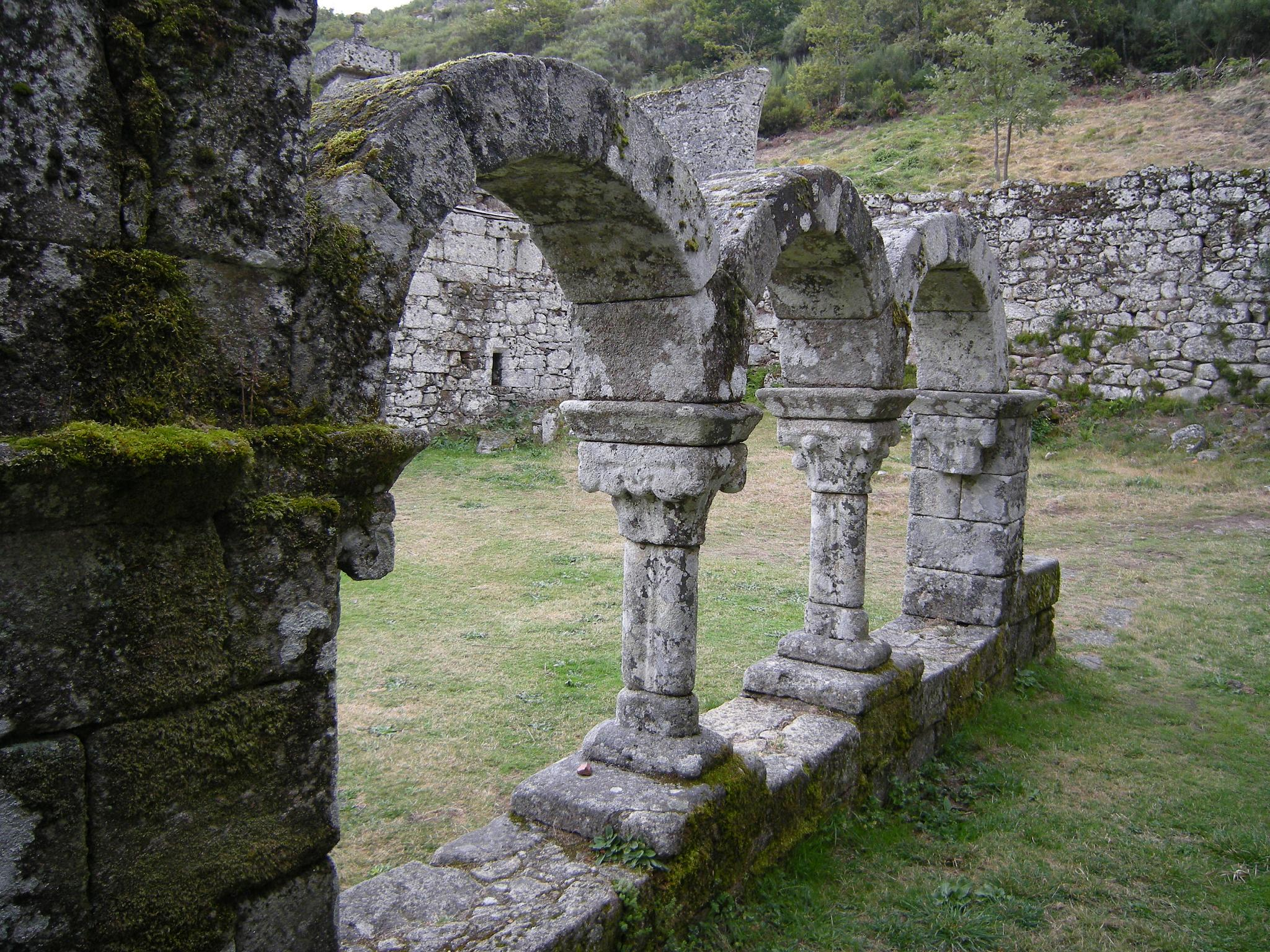
Ruined cloisters of Pitões das Júnias Monastery, dating back to the early 9th century.

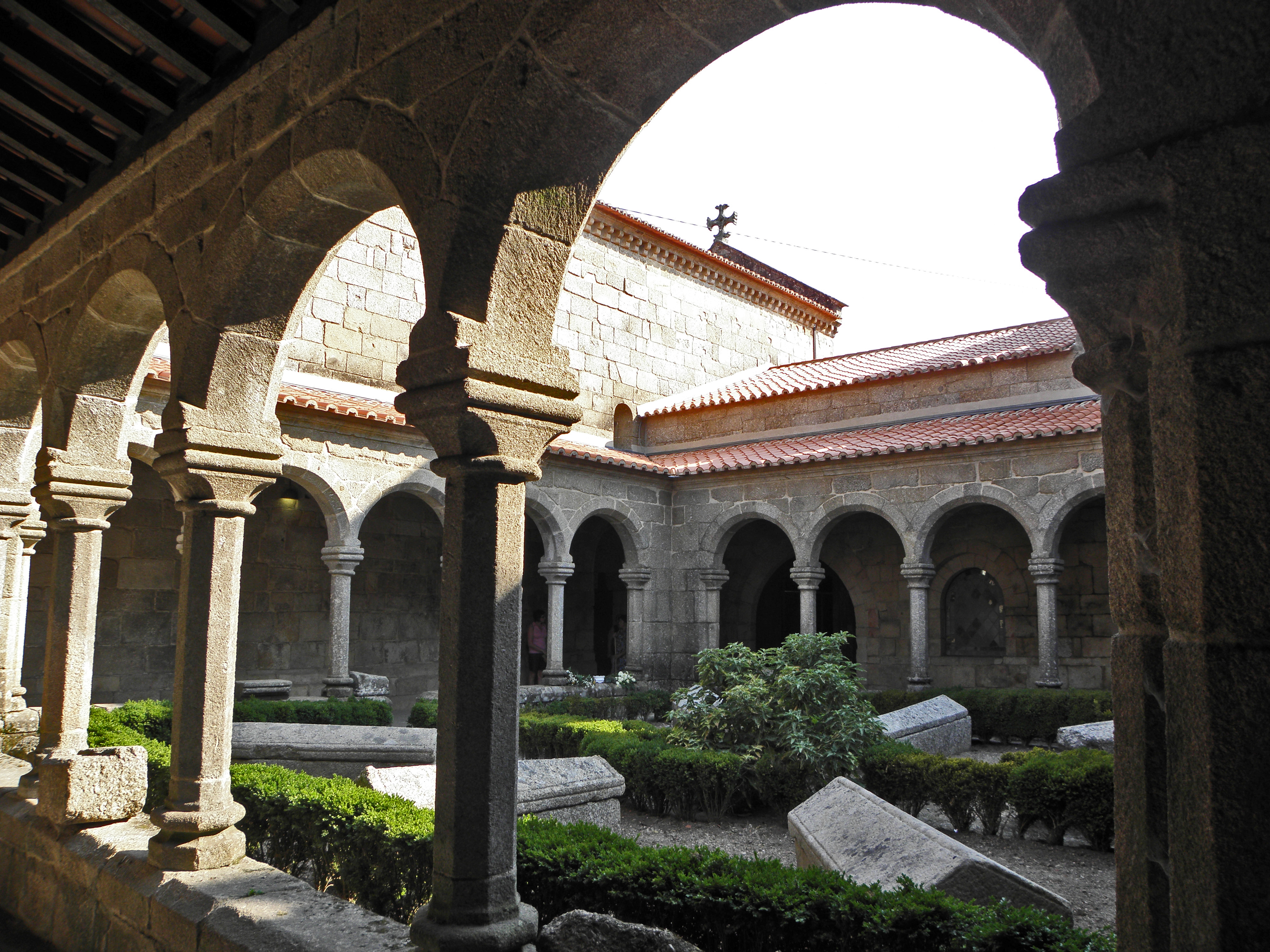
Monastery of Cete cloister have simple composite capitals with no decorations.

== Cistercian Romanesque ==
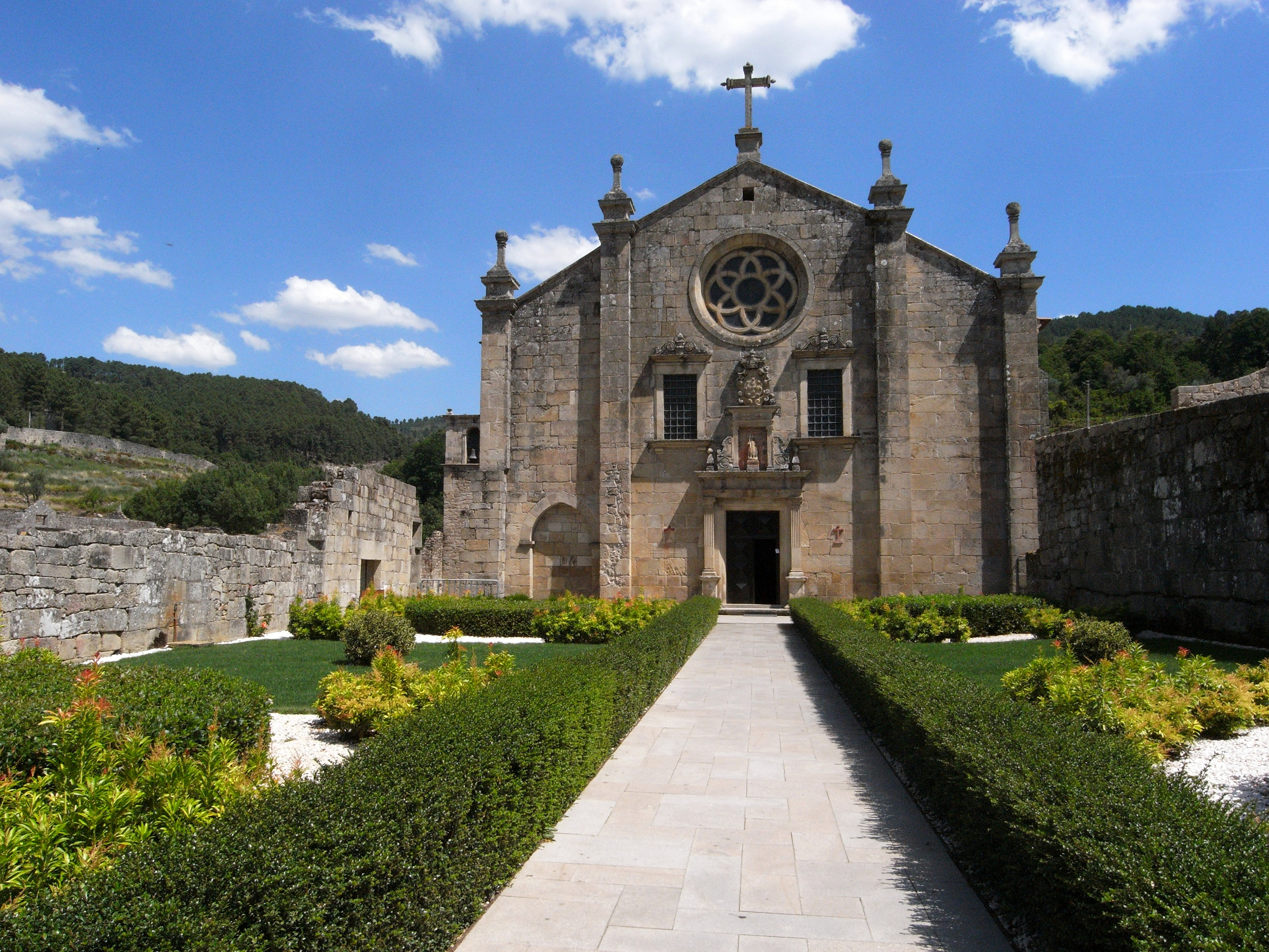
Tarouca Abbey copying the facade of the Abbey of Fontenay.

The Cistercian Romanesque architecture reflected the austerity and sobriety characteristic of that monastical Order in their quest for a mistic and spiritual goal preached by their leader and mentor Saint Bernard of Clairvaux. In Portugal, besides a Cistercian Gothic-featured architecture (in which the Alcobaça Monastery is a universal symbol), there is a previous Romanesque style expressed by the Abbeys of Tarouca (construction started in 1144, the year of Cistercian monks arrival in Portugal), Salzedas (started in 1152) and Fiães (started in 1163).

In the architecture of Cistercian churches the transept is usually quite wide and the lateral aisles are covered with groined vaults that help to sustain the longitudinal central nave. There is a clear preference for square-shaped apses, more simple and economical to build. The columns and piers supporting pointed-arched arcades (already a proto-Gothic feature), have big strong capitals and stand on rectangular blocks on the ground floor. Although Tarouca Abbey was clearly inspired in the Burgundian abbeys of Clairvaux and Fontenay and Salzedas still have some similarities with Fontfroide, their authentic and magnificent Cistercian architectural features are mixed with local Portuguese decorative motifs.

Some of smaller churches were also influenced by Cistercian Romanesque, like the vault of São Martinho de Mouros that shows the influx of Tarouca's abbey central nave vault and the exterior capitals in the main altar of Armamar church are significantly influenced by the outlayer of Salzedas abbey.

Cistercian abbeys and churches

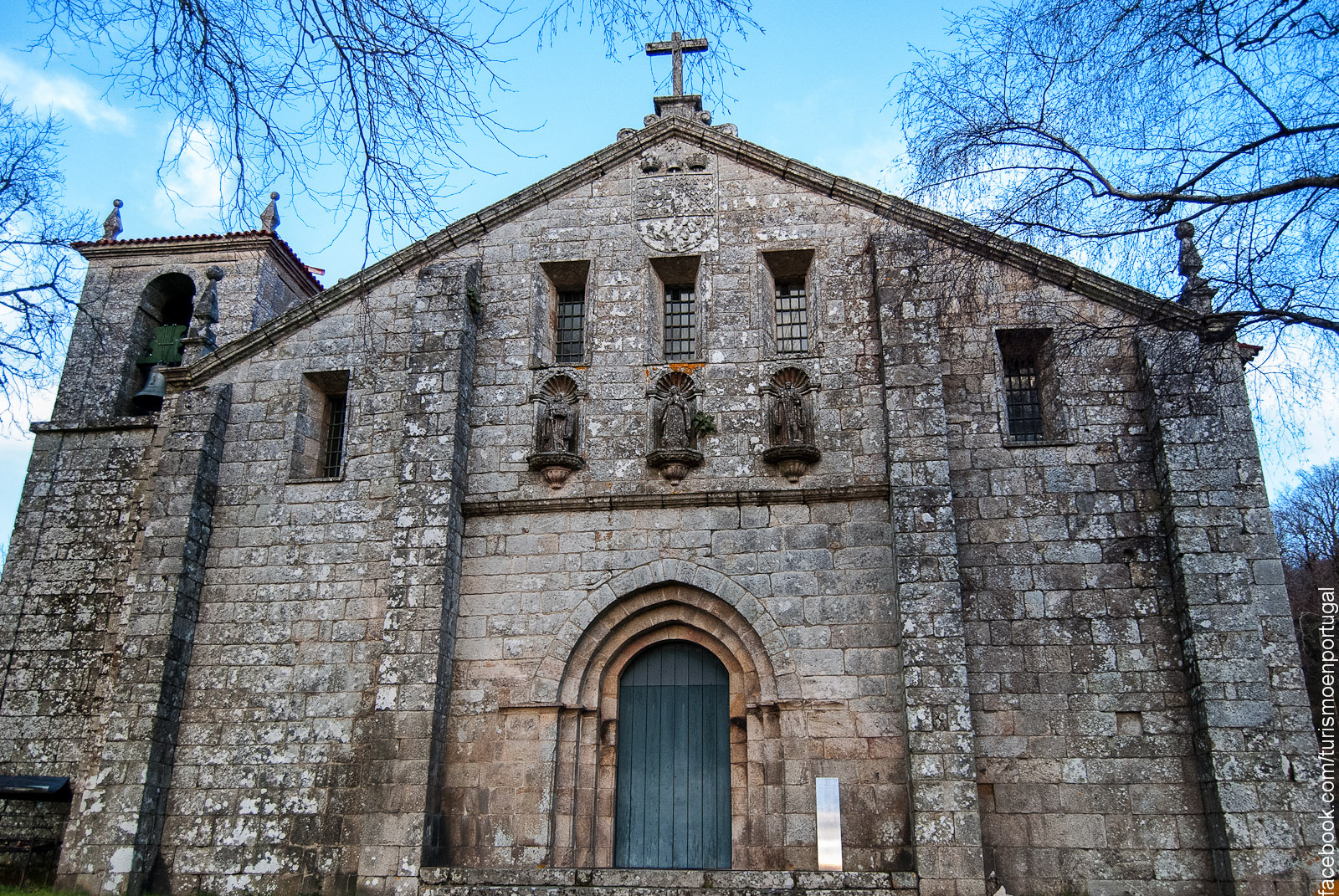
Fiães Monastery near Melgaço is one of the oldest Cistercian abbeys in Portugal founded in 1163.

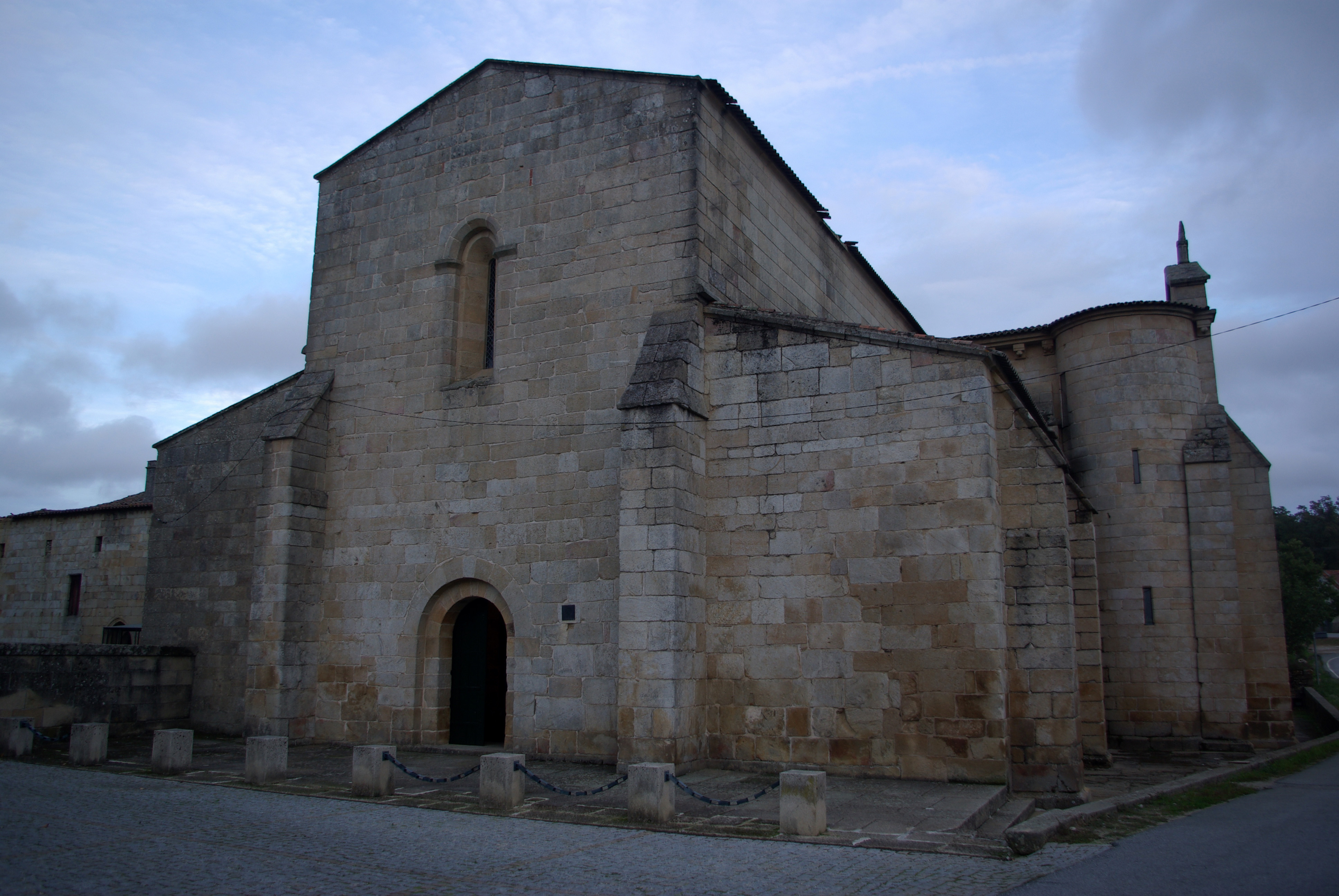
Santa Maria de Aguiar Abbey, copying the facade of Fontfroide Abbey.

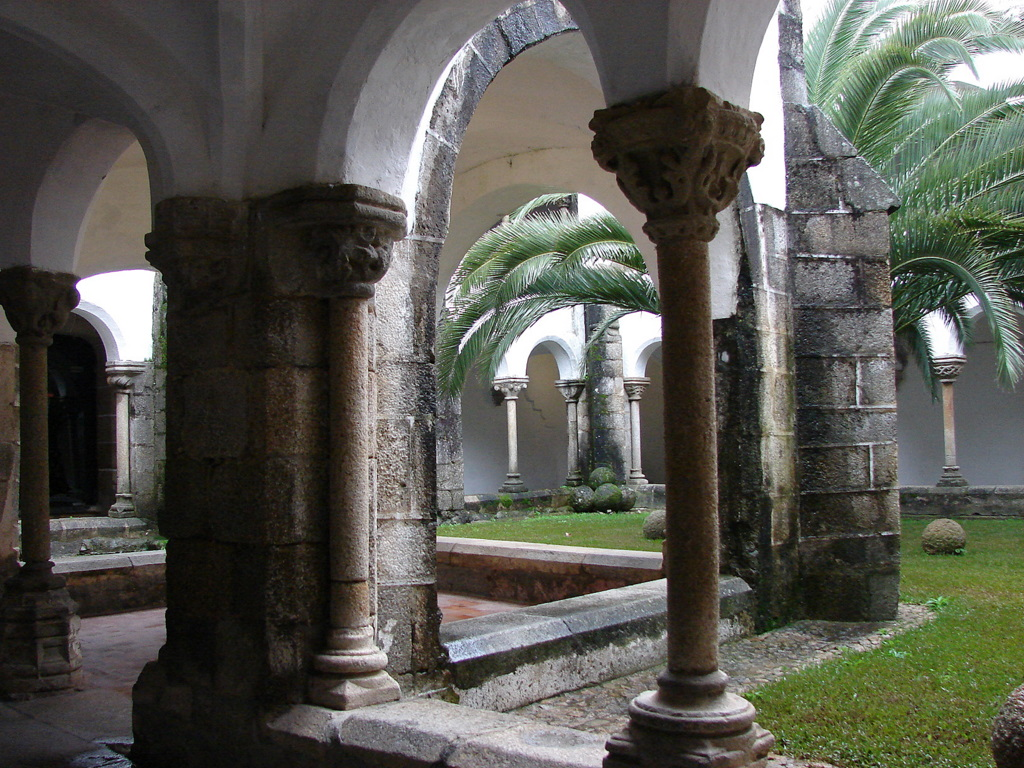
São Bernardo Convent cloisters supported by buttress.

== Civil and military architecture ==
=== Domus Municipalis (Town hall) of Bragança ===
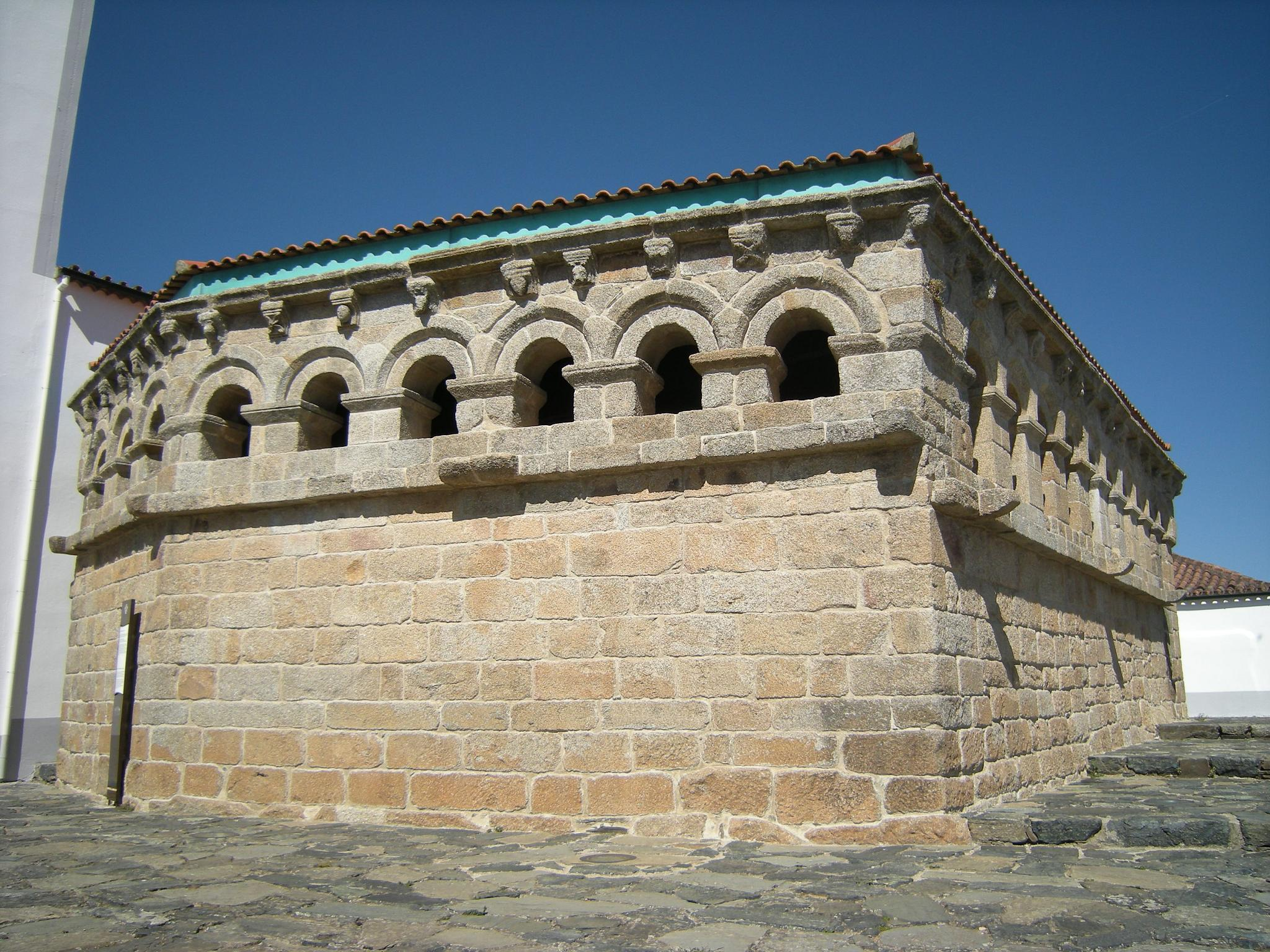
The stonework of the Domus Municipalis, located across the courtyard of Bragança Castle.

The Domus Municipalis (Latin: municipal house) is a Romanesque building in the northeastern municipality of Bragança. Its exact function, name and construction date have been the onset of much debate and controversy, even after many researches during the 20th century: first it was believed it could have been the city's Municipal house (Portuguese: "Casa da Câmara"), place of public meetings and a symbol of people's local government through their representatives, but more recent findings have presented basis for a theory that it could have served as cistern, but there are still doubts if that was its primary function.

This singular (and enigmatic) building of Romanesque civic architecture also presents challenges in its dating construction. An initial thesis stated that by its design and decorative features it could have been built as early as the 10th or 11th century, but a closer look actually tells us that was, most likely, built in the first half of the 13th century. Also, a deeper research showed that the existing building might be the result of two different dating constructions, with an older cistern on its lower floor and a meeting room built on top, using the already existing structure. Doubts about its real function arose from a document of 1501 in which the author (according to the published writings of the Abbot of Baçal (1865–1947)) referred to the local record of Martim Anes (1185–1254) who spoke of the construction of the Domus upper level during his lifetime. In this account he stated that it was used as a meeting place for the "good men" of the municipality.

There is another document from 1503 referring to the building as both a Sala da Água (English: Water-room) and a place where the town representatives gathered to discuss and sign contracts, therefore, it should not be surprising if this supposed double-function turns out to be correct. Its construction date also becomes more clear in face of this facts, art-historian Carlos Alberto Ferreira de Almeida noted that by its medallions, the diamond-shaped openings and the layout of windows we can date the upper level by the end of the 13th century or beginning of the 14th century, in which its already archaic Romanesque architectural style can be explained with the need of a compromise with the pre-existent cistern.

Located near the Castle's courtyard alongside the Church of Santa Maria, the structure is based on a multi-level irregular pentagon, constructed of rounded granite blocks and held together by mortar, with a barrel vaulted wooden roof supported by three arches and covered by tiles. Its floor-plan is slightly steeped and a natural water fountain was found in the Northwest corner at a low depth.

Details of Domus Municipalis

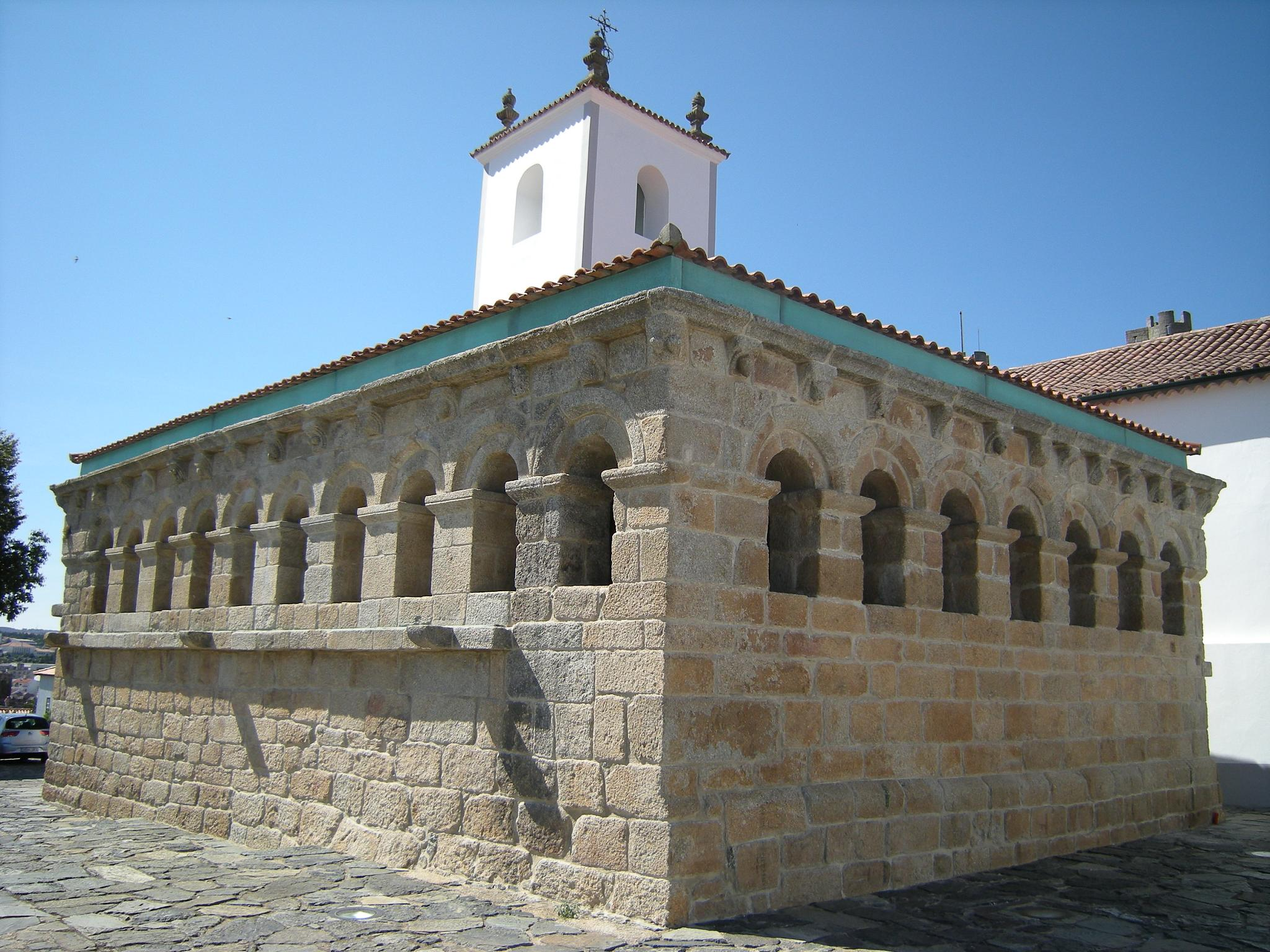
The inferior corner of the Domus structure.

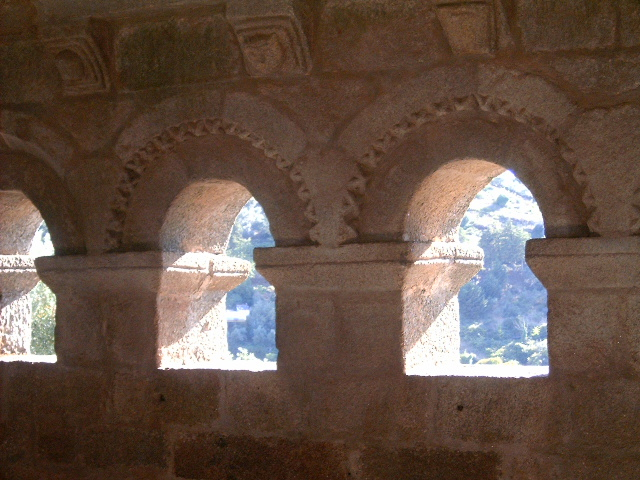
Details of the windows inner frame.

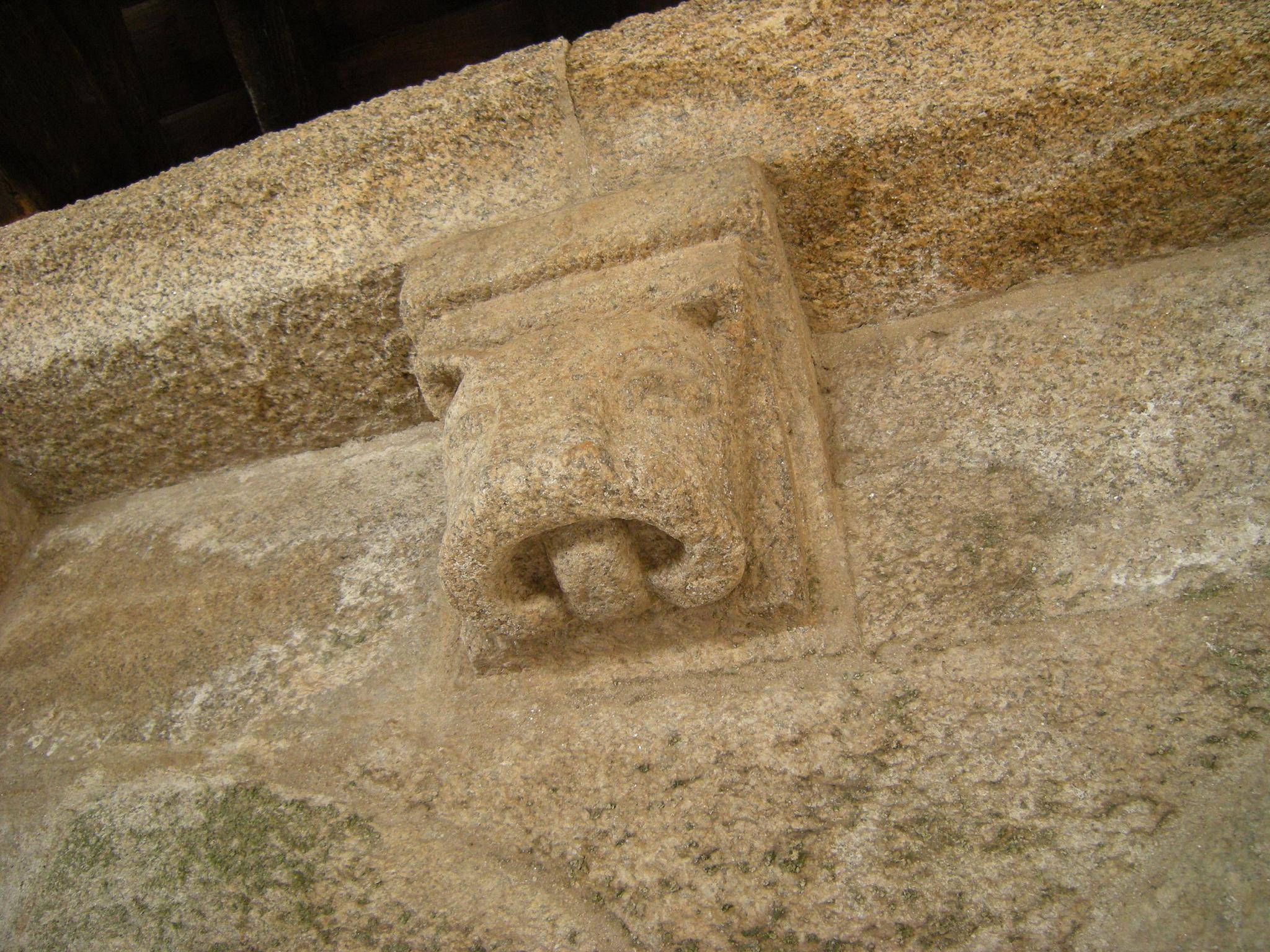
Corbel details.

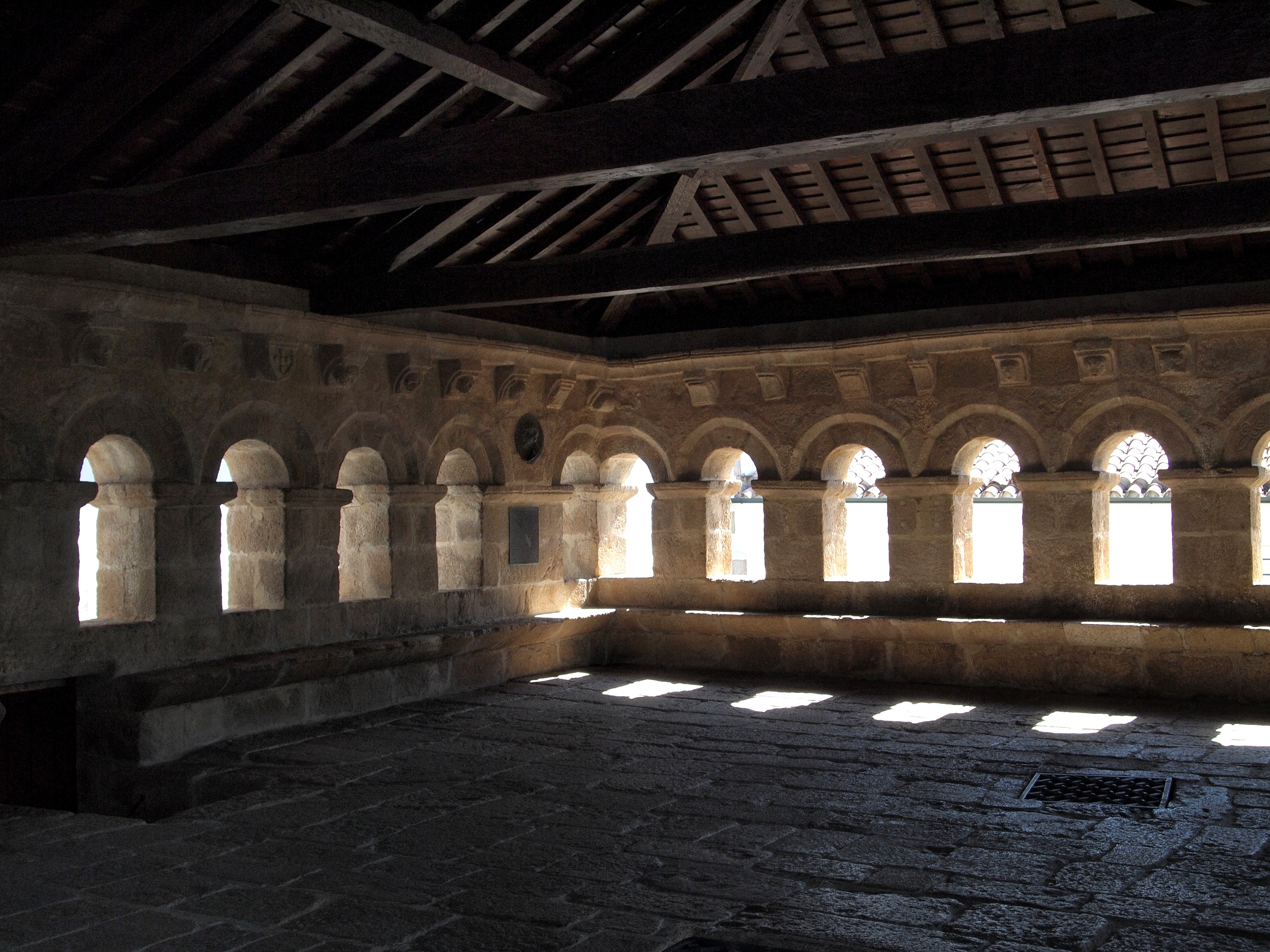
Southeastern view of the hall.

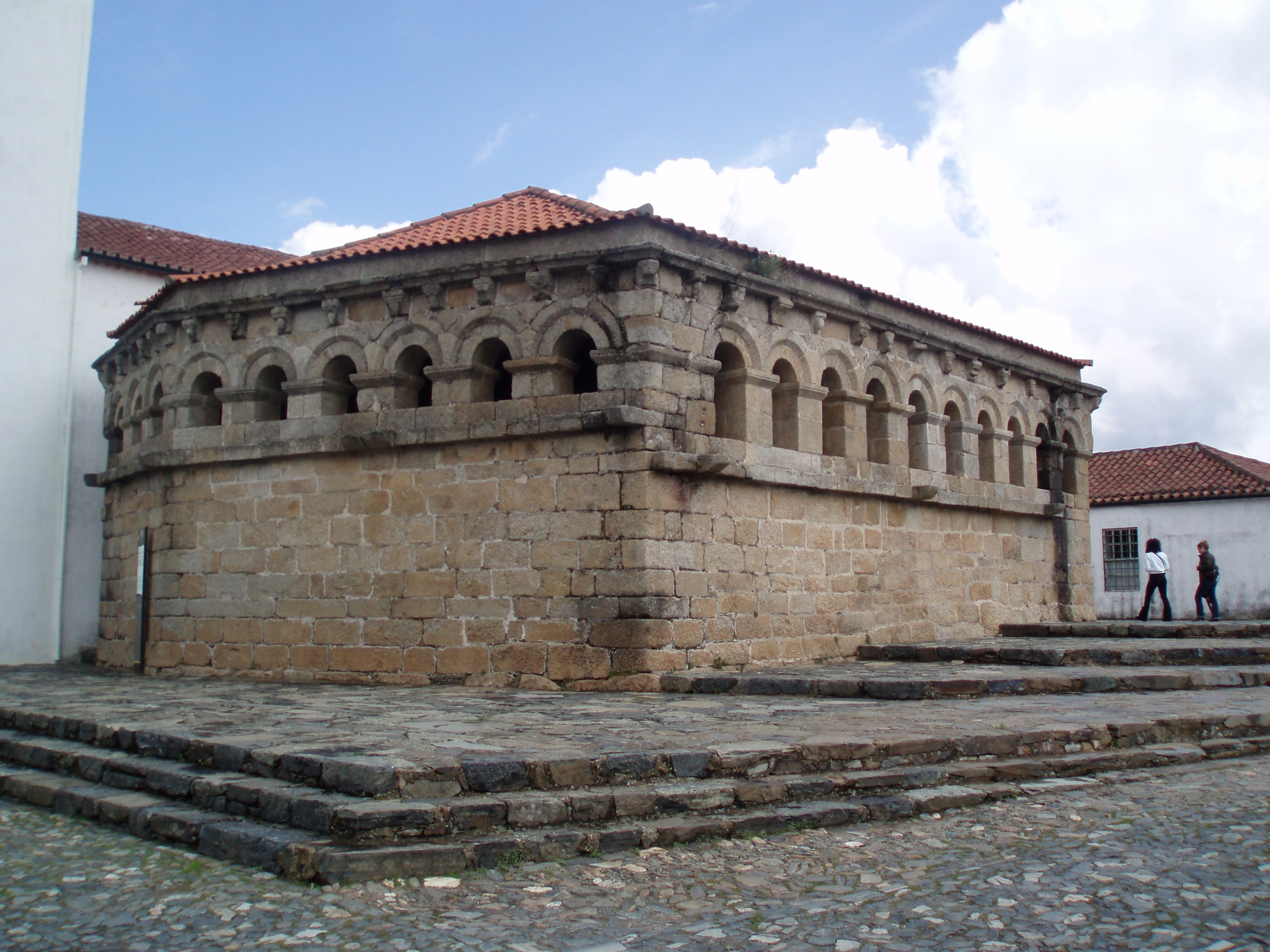
Northeastern corner of the building.

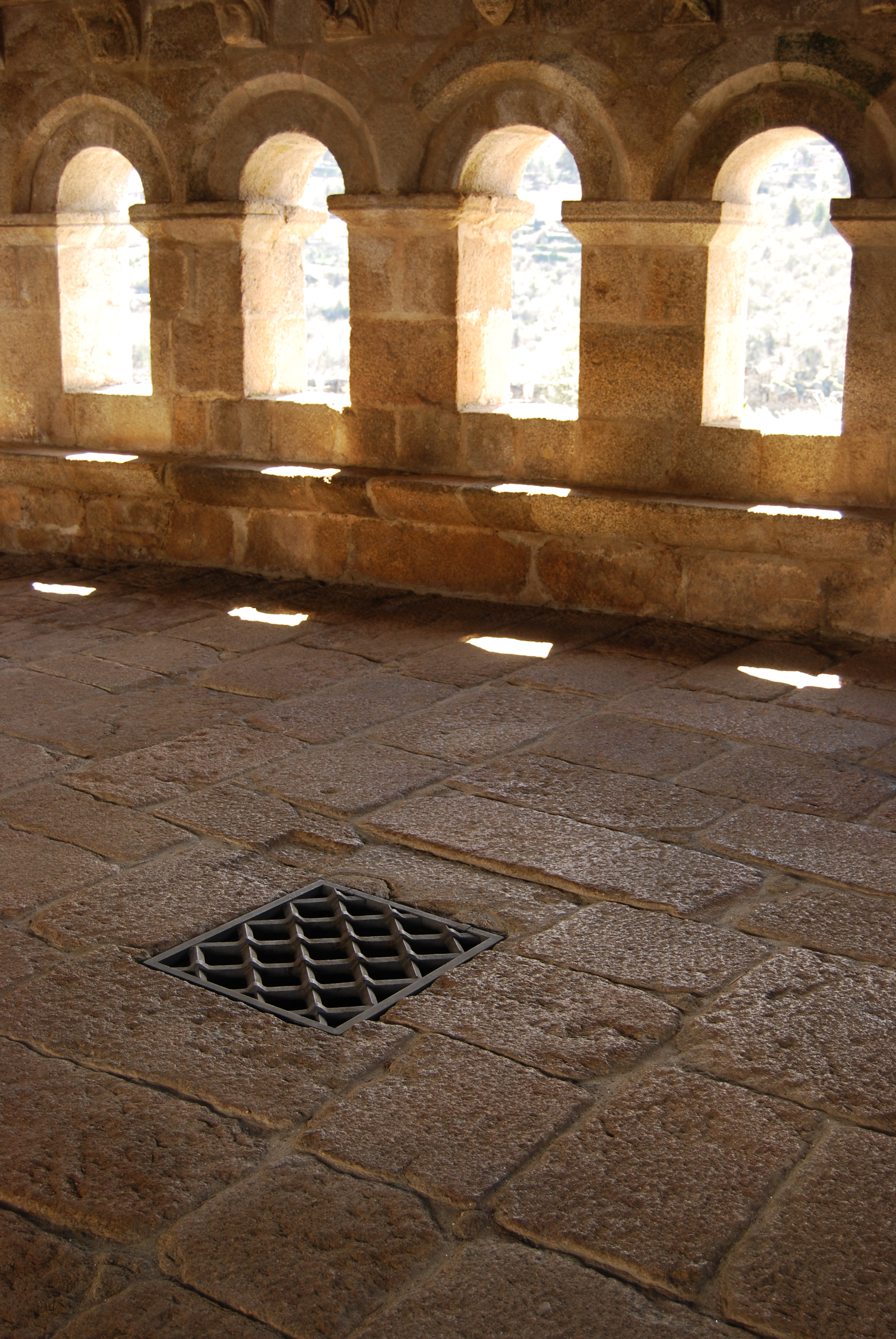
Cistern drain hole, another proof of the building's double-function.

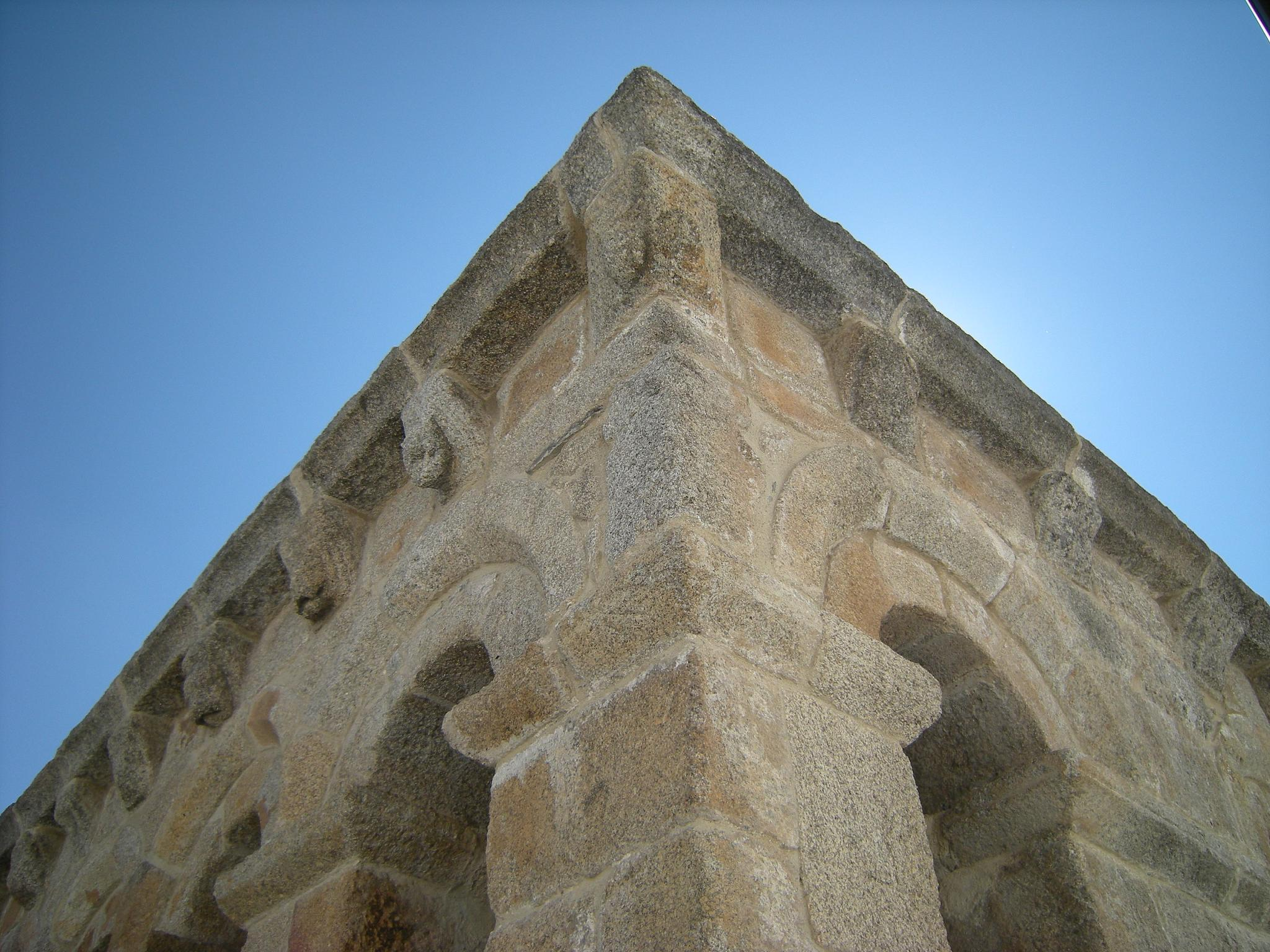
Corbel details show its Romanesque style although probably built in a later period.

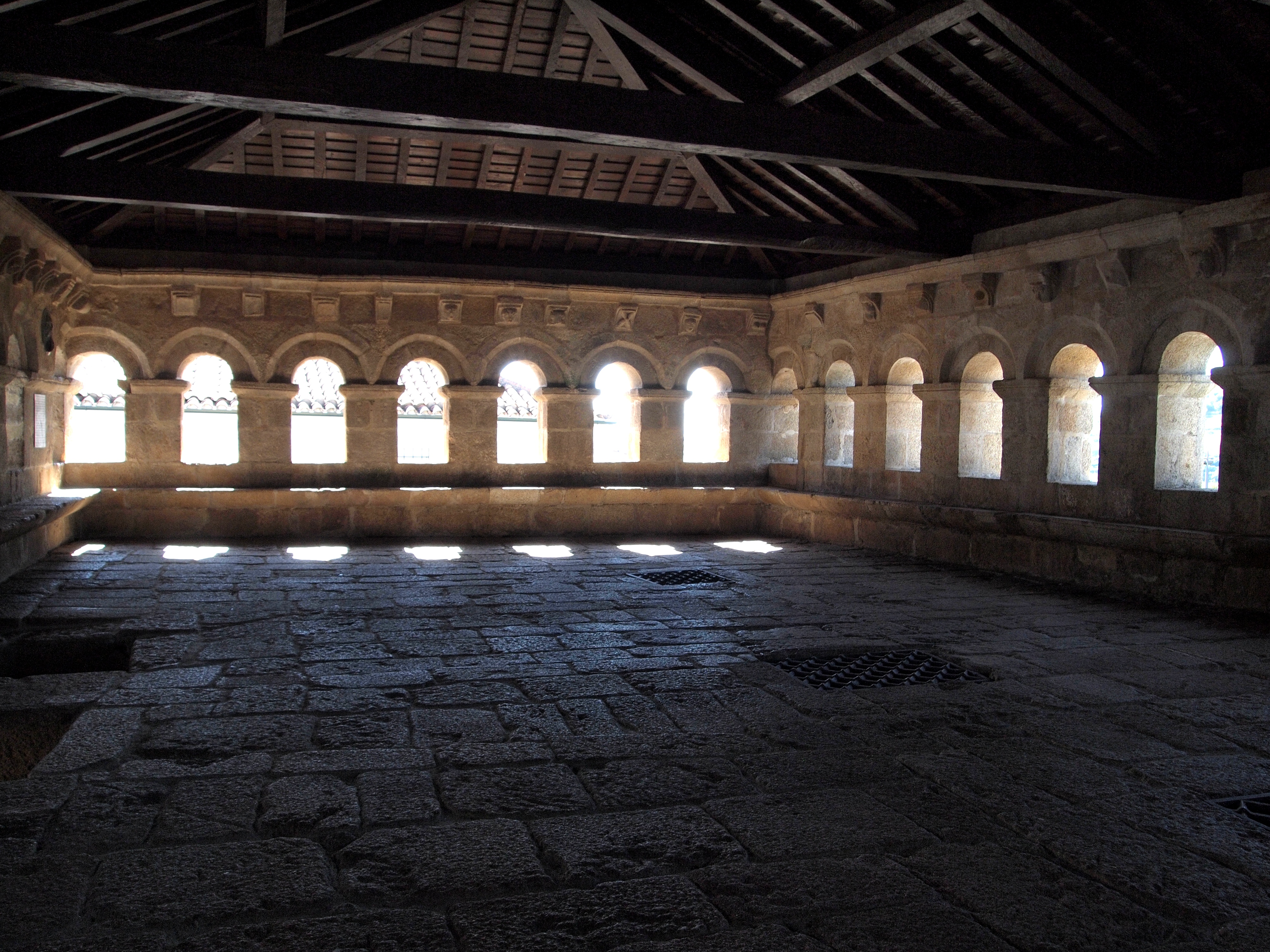
Upper level where the town meetings took place (cistern drains in the centre )

=== Towers and fortified houses ===
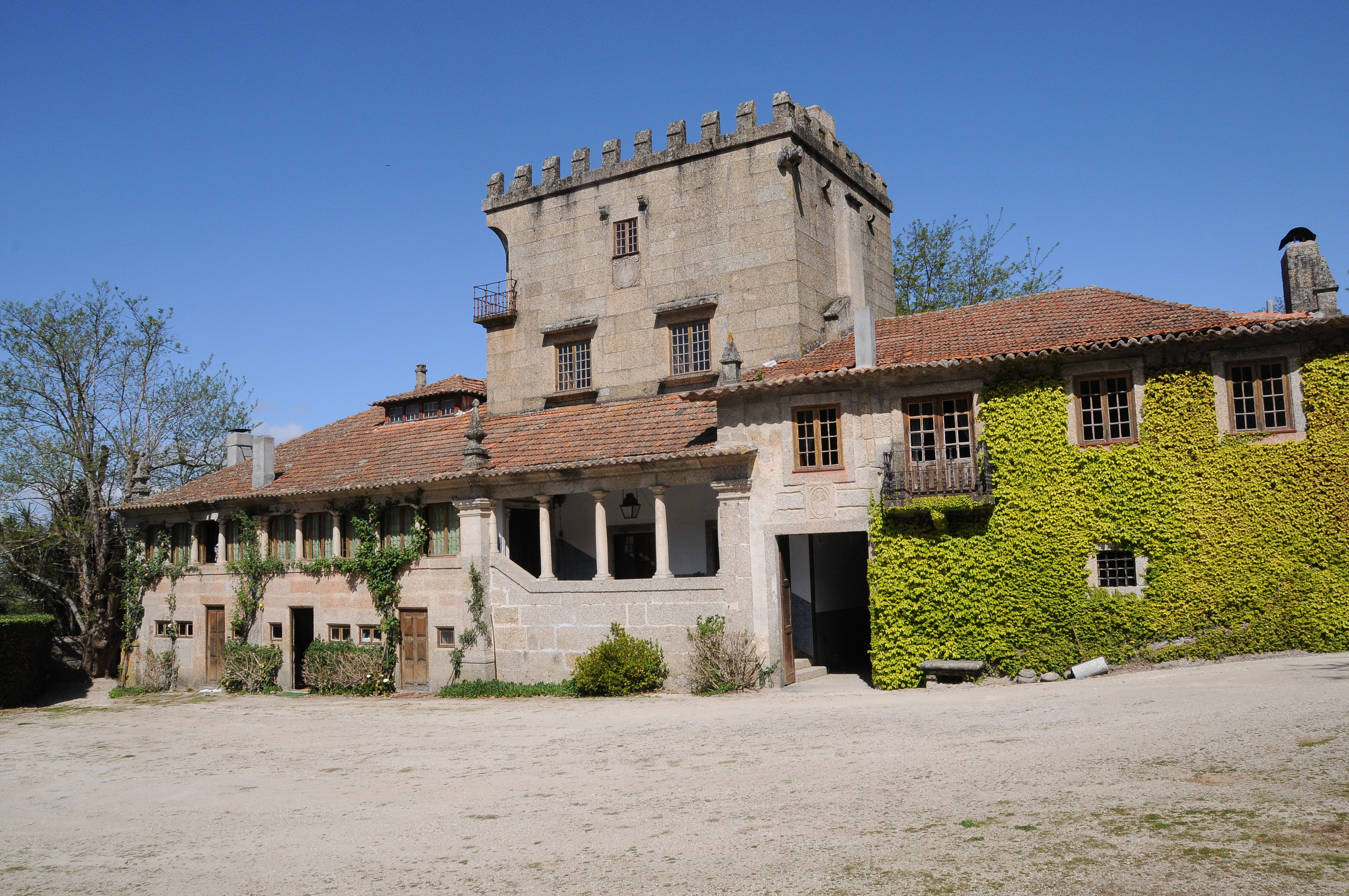
Tower-House of São Cipriano, near Guimarães. Remodelled in the 15th and 18th centuries, its tower and main building date back to the early 12th century.

In sharp contrast to the reality throughout most of Europe, there are still some examples of Portuguese Romanesque civil architecture that survived to our days, specially the fortified noble residences or Domus Fortis (in Portuguese:"Casa-Torre"). Most are no longer more than single towers that stand out from more modern constructions carried out in the house that surrounds them, and many were remodelled in later Gothic and Renaissance styles, but their Romanesque features are still very much visible. These noble fortified manors were built within, or in the periphery, of feudal lands (Coutos or Honras), among agricultural fertile valleys. We can also find them in neighbouring areas of forests or mountain ranges where nobility could control new farm lands outside more occupied regions in which the purchase of new lands and titles was more difficult.

Among those we have the manors and towers of Vilar (Penafiel), Pousada (Guimarães), Dornelas in Braga, Oriz (Vila Verde), Lourosa do Campo (Arouca) and Quintela (Vila Real). In northern Portugal there were two kinds of fortified houses during the Middle Ages: the Manor house and the Domus Fortis. The manor house, associated with high and middle nobility, doesn't follow an architectural frame but are rather a cluster of different autonomous buildings, as opposite with the "Domus Fortis" that follows a specific kind of fortified structure which was originated by the last quarter of the 11th century becoming extensively widespread by the late 12th century and through the 13th and 14th centuries. This kind of model was adopted by the smaller ranks of nobility in search of social ascension in a way of displaying to local communities their newly acquired power.

The Domus Fortis is composed by several divisions:

- The most important being the Tower, of square plan (round ones were rare in Portugal), fortifying the house and offering protection to their owners and respective servants in case of need. It was built with four levels, each corresponding to a single division. Just like a keep tower in castles, the main gate was accessed by the first floor rather than the ground floor. This ground floor was the reception and living room, as the upper floors were destined for private chambers.

- A "domus fortis" also had a separate building coupled with or close to the tower, with rectangular plan and two floors. Those were usually the servants area and accommodations.

- In some cases is reported the existence of a private chapel like in Vasconcelos Tower-house. Also other individual structures, like kitchens, were built close to water springs or small streams. No remains are left from these buildings although their existence if fully documented.

Most of tower-houses were built in northern and central regions of Portugal that belonged to feudal areas. Some were progressively restored in later centuries reflecting more modern Renaissance and Baroque styles: like Aguiã, Refoios, Gomariz, Castro, Faralães and Barbosa Tower-Houses. In other cases their towers were separated from the main building like Silva, Quintela, Oriz and Penegate Towers, among others.

Towers and Manor Houses

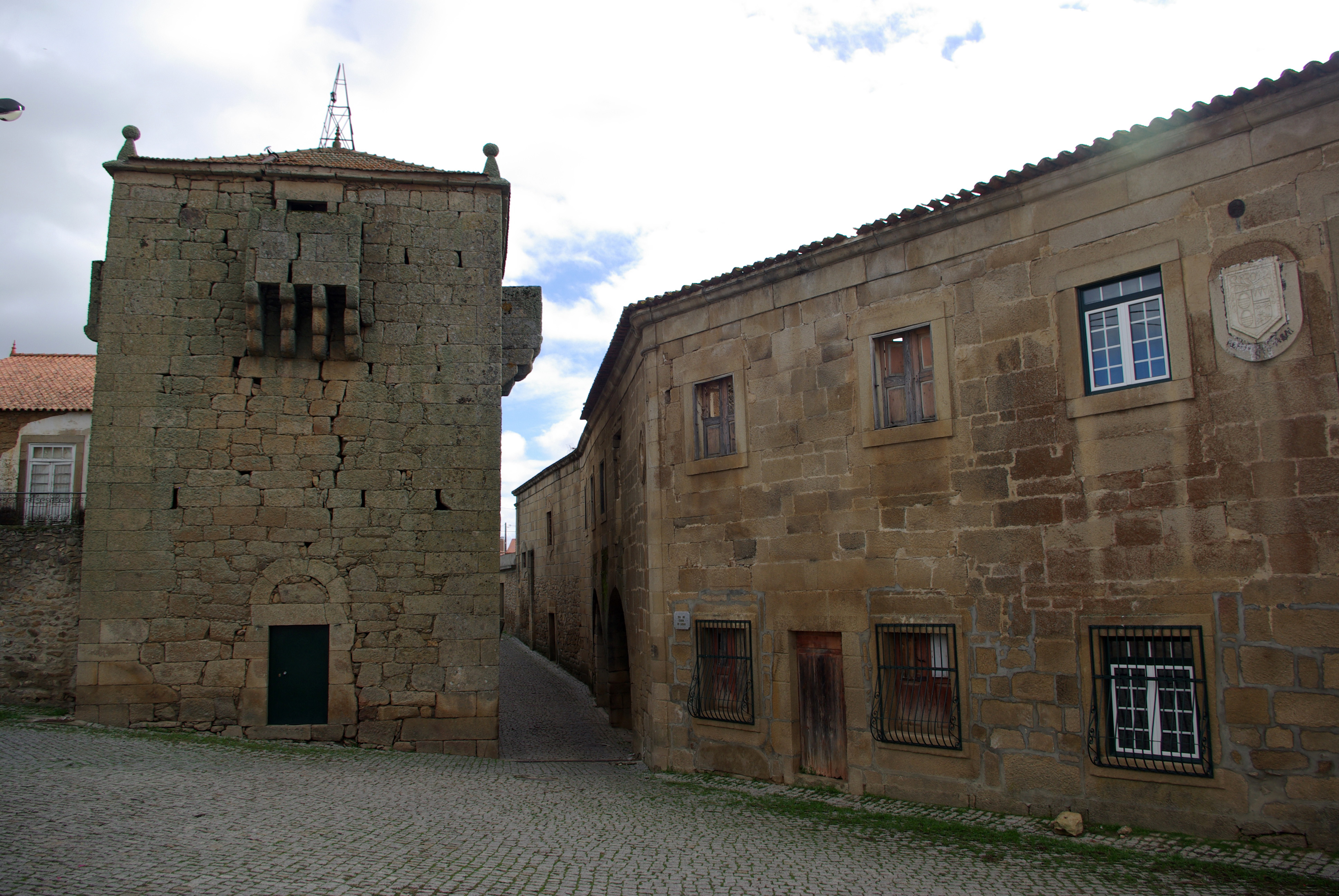
Tower of Metelos from the early 13th century.

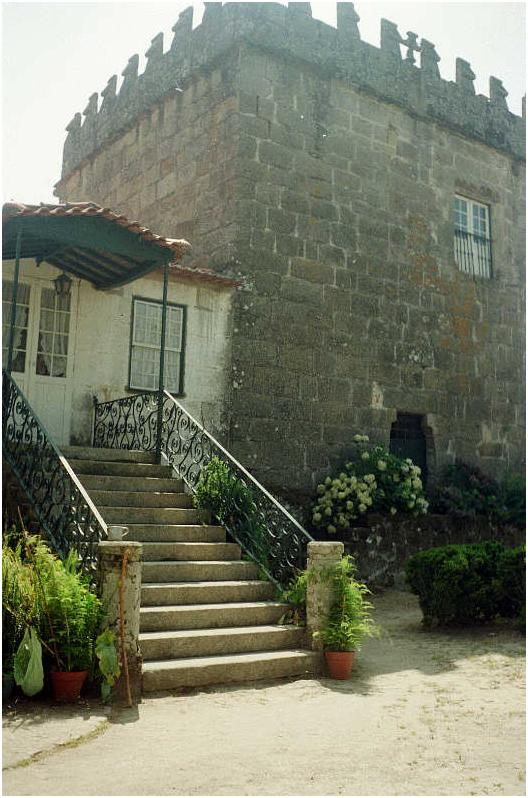
Barbosa Tower-House in Penafiel. One of the oldest "domus fortis", believed to have been built in the 9th century.

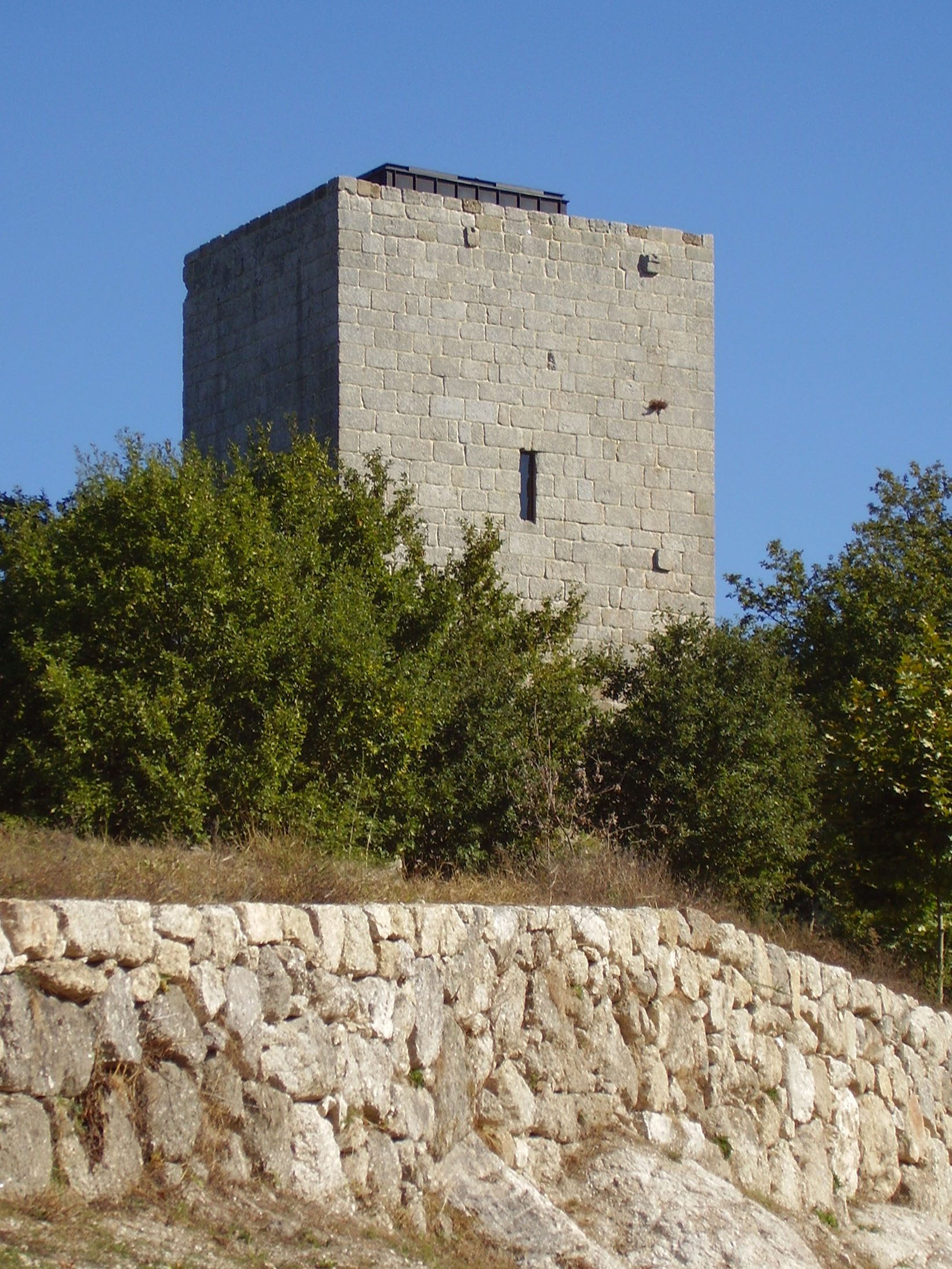
Vilar Tower in Lousada, 13th century.

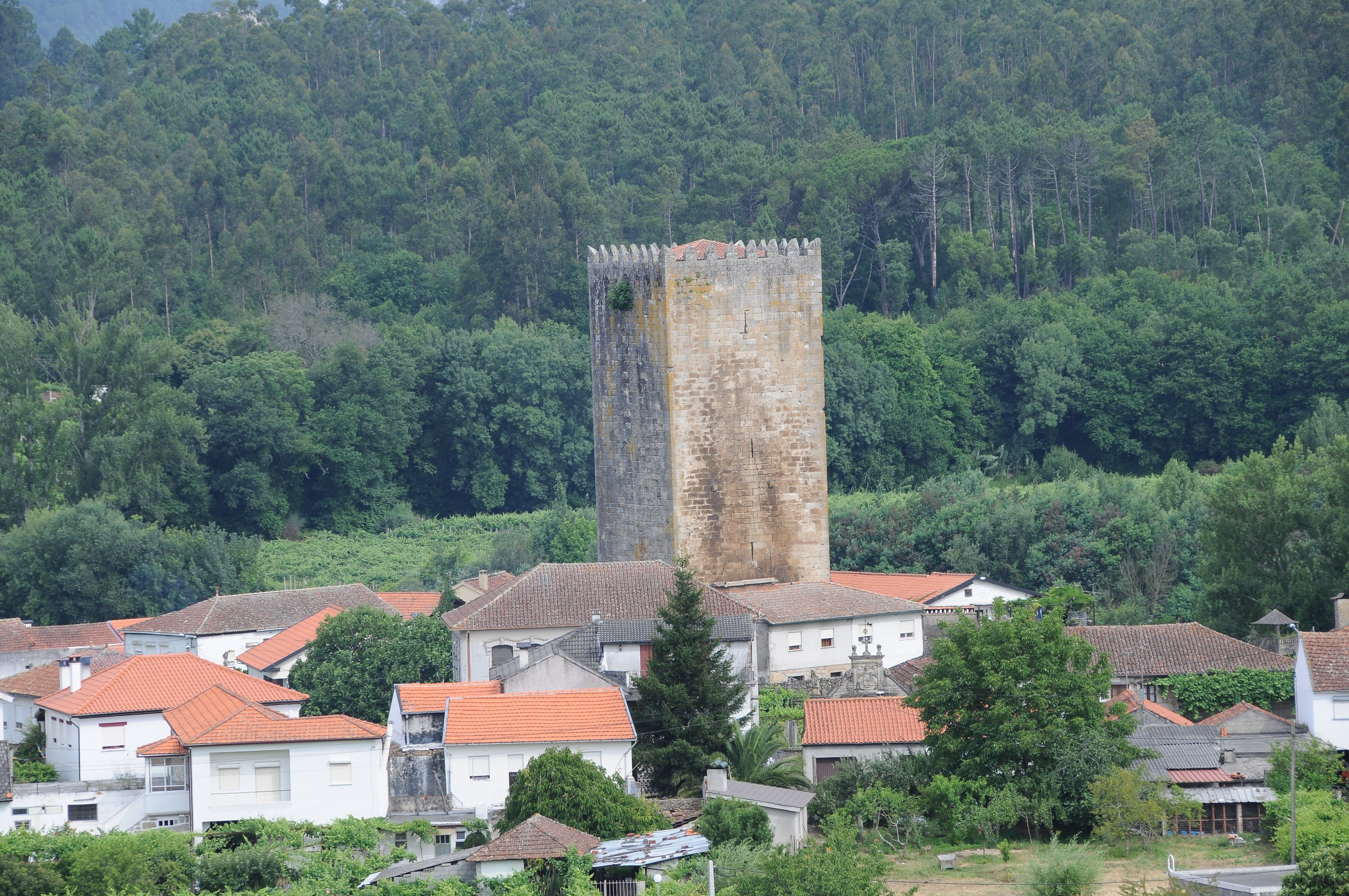
Lapela Tower in Monção (12th century). Once belonged to a castle from which it is the only surviving structure.

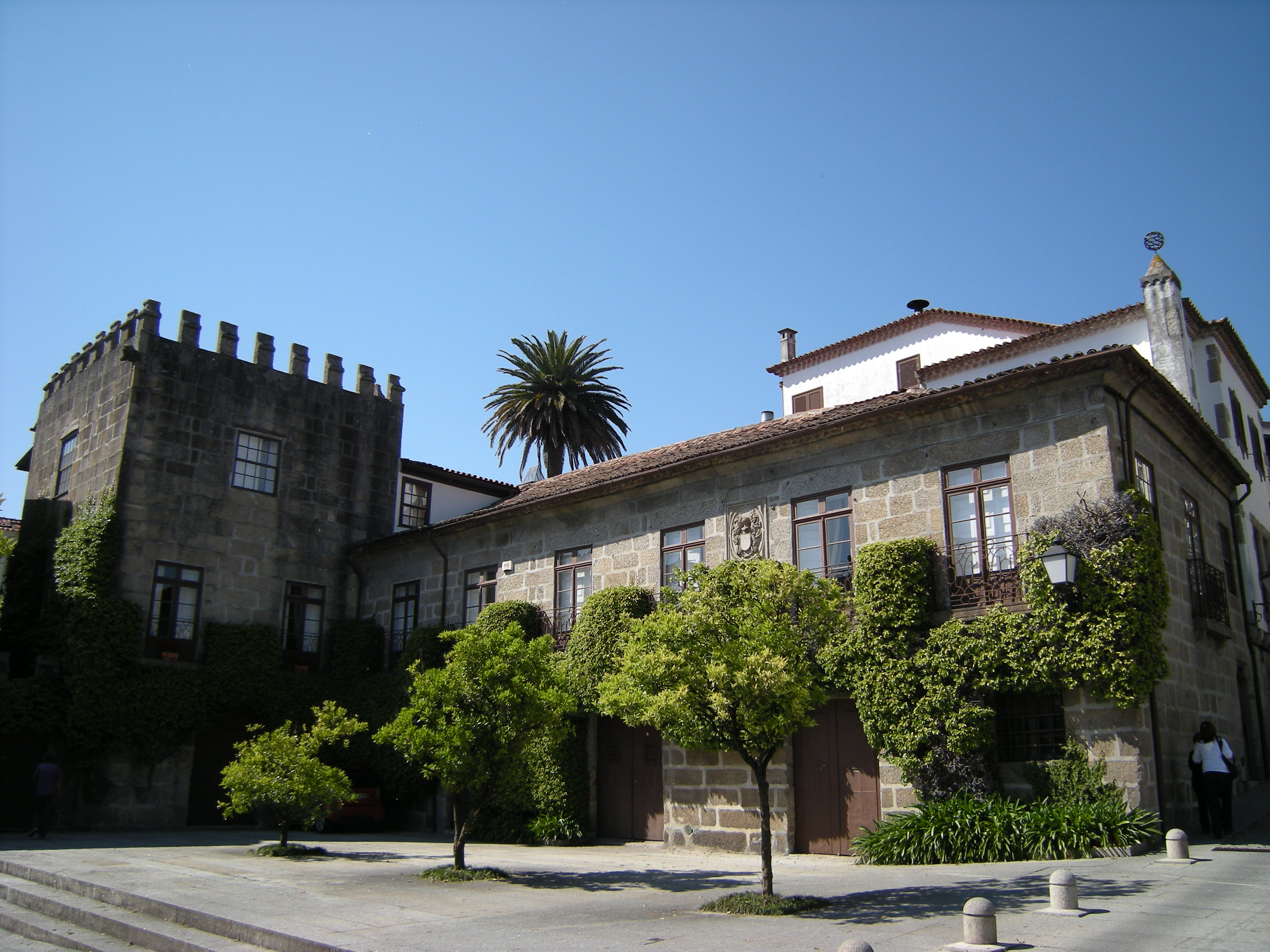
Laranjais Tower-House in Guimarães. 11th-century tower and main building remodelled in the 16th and 17th centuries.

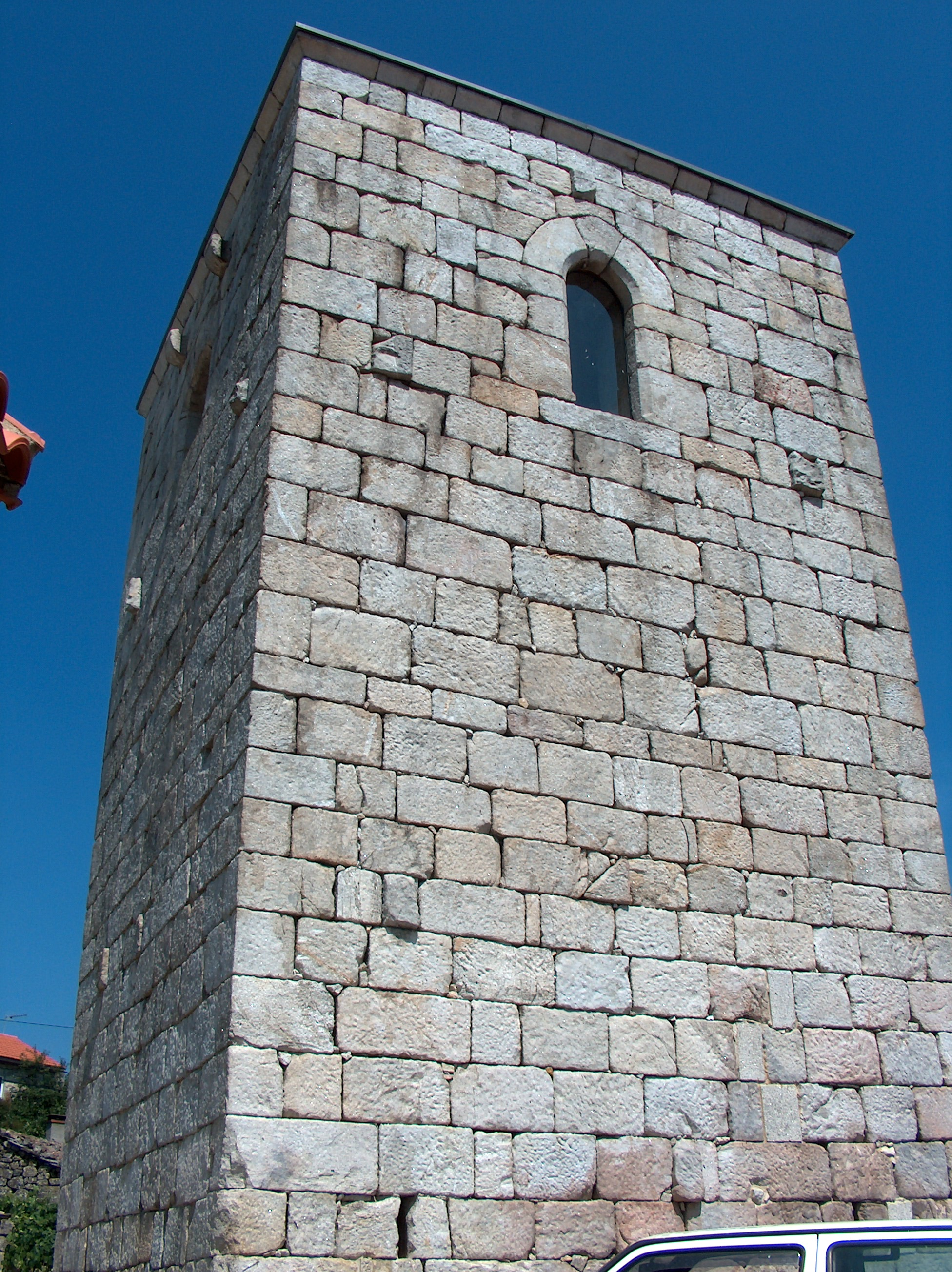
Alcofra Tower in Vouzela, early 12th century.

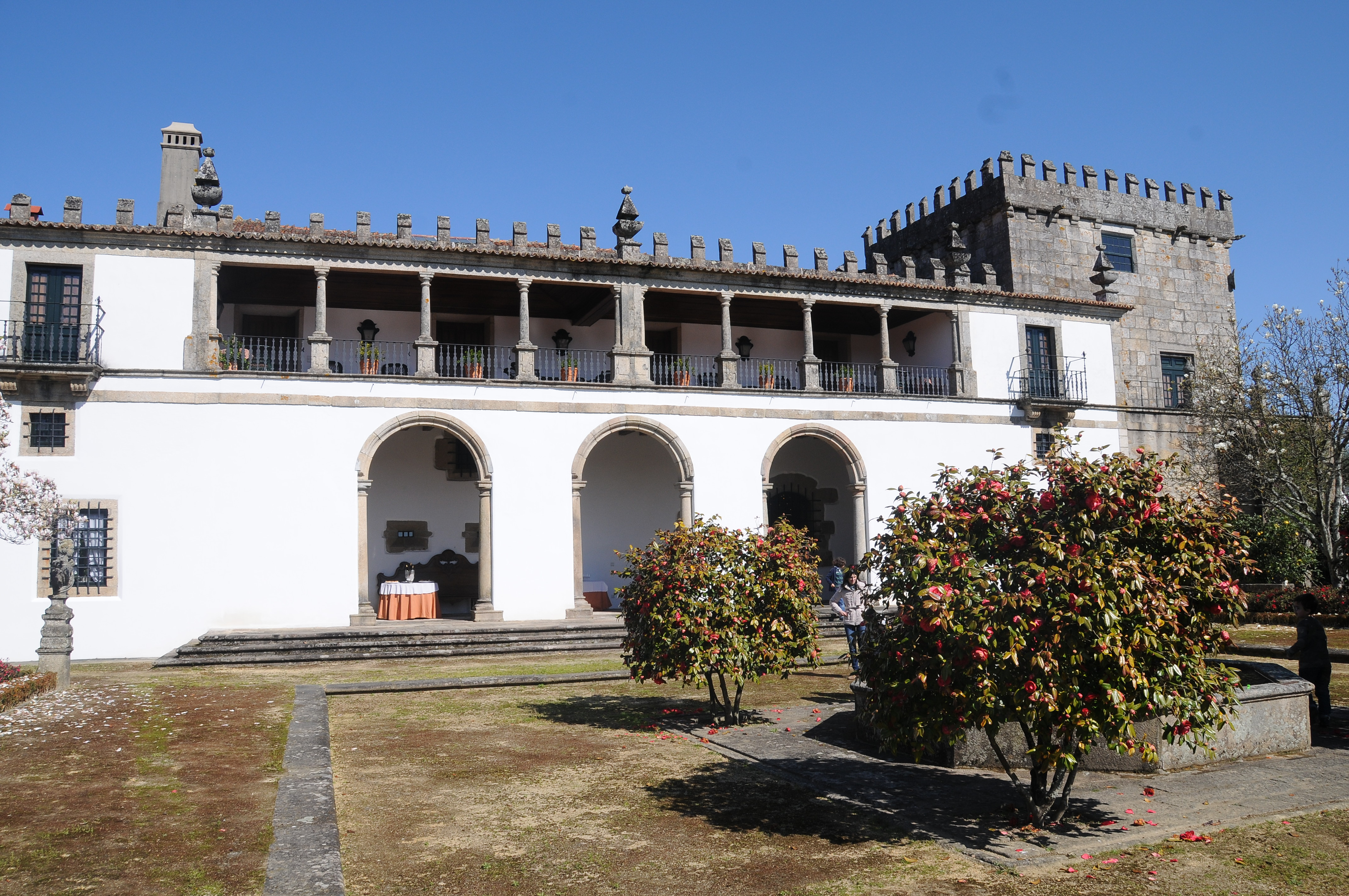
Azevedo Tower-House, in Braga (13th century). Nowadays, like many manors, is a rural-tourism guest house.

=== Bridges ===
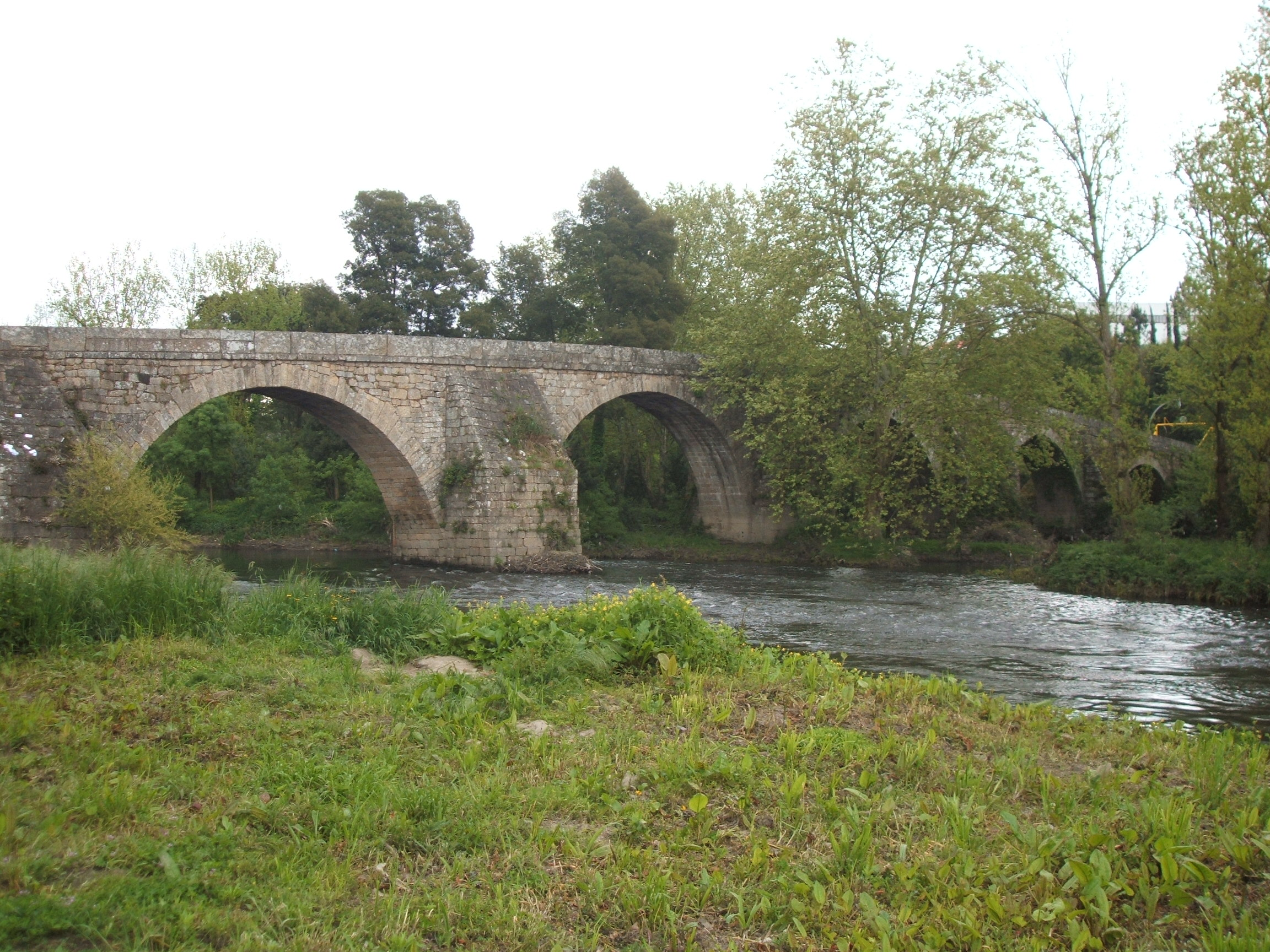
Lagoncinha Bridge over the Ave River, built in the 12th century on the road between Braga and Porto.

Construction activity of bridges during the Middle Ages is directly related to the need of restoring the old Roman road system that was already obsolete, in order to develop new connections and boost trading. Since the end of the 11th century that need was so urgent that building bridges and restoring the paveways were activities that started to be considered as pious. São Gonçalo of Amarante and São Lourenço Mendes, sponsors of the construction of Amarante and Cavês bridges, respectively, were called saints by popular acclamation, such as Saint Benizet of Avignon (France) or Sán Domingos da Calçada (La Rioja (Spain)), showing how much this phenomenon of bridge and road construction were considered extremely important elsewhere in Europe.

In the will of monarchs, noblemen and clergymen there are many references to donations for building bridges, King D.Afonso Henriques (1109–1185) himself contributed to the construction of Coimbra, Ave and Piares (Douro river) bridges. The stonemasons of the Romanesque period were more careful about the structural design and maintenance of bridges than their previous Roman counterparts, and looked for more solid grounds to build them, and because of that, according to Carlos Alberto Ferreira de Almeida, medieval bridges resisted better against the danger of floodings and the test of time.

Romanesque bridges present large arches whose height had to be balanced with the use of abutments at each end by transferring the weight of the bridge and its loads partially into a horizontal thrust restrained by the abutments at either side. Bridge builders also improved on the Roman structures by using narrower piers, thinner arch barrels and lower span-rise ratios. Examples of these are the bridges of Lagoncinha (12th century), over the Ave River, with six arches, Prado bridge over the Cávado River (11th century), with nine arches and Cavês bridge over the Tâmega River (13th century).

Bridge building deeply shaped the Portuguese medieval landscape. Among the Romanesque civil architecture and by the economical and technical means used for their construction, the building of bridges had the most impact in everyday life, benefiting communication between people.

Bridges

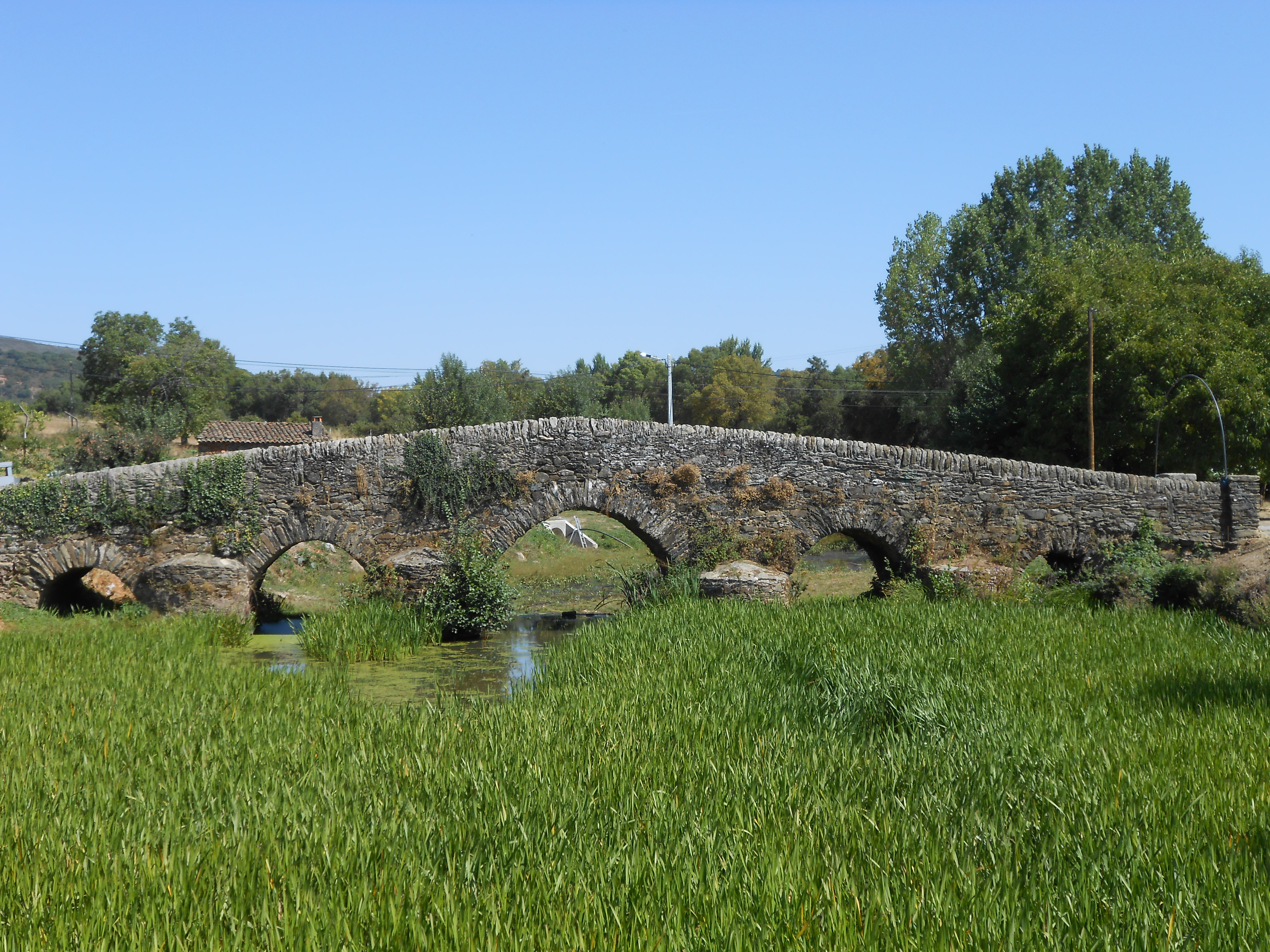
Frieira Bridge built in the 13th century.

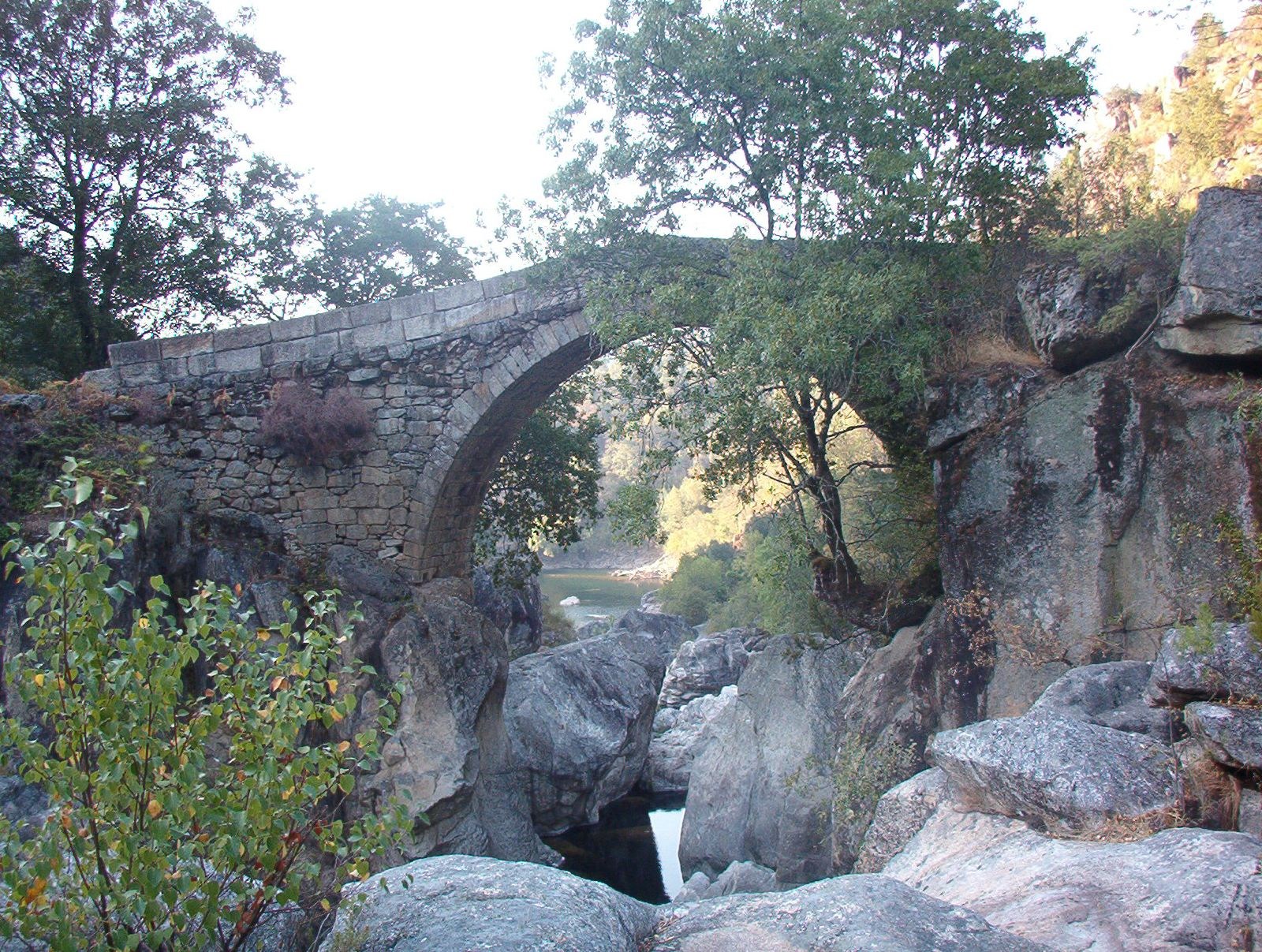
Mizarela Bridge, built in the 12th century replacing an old Roman bridge.

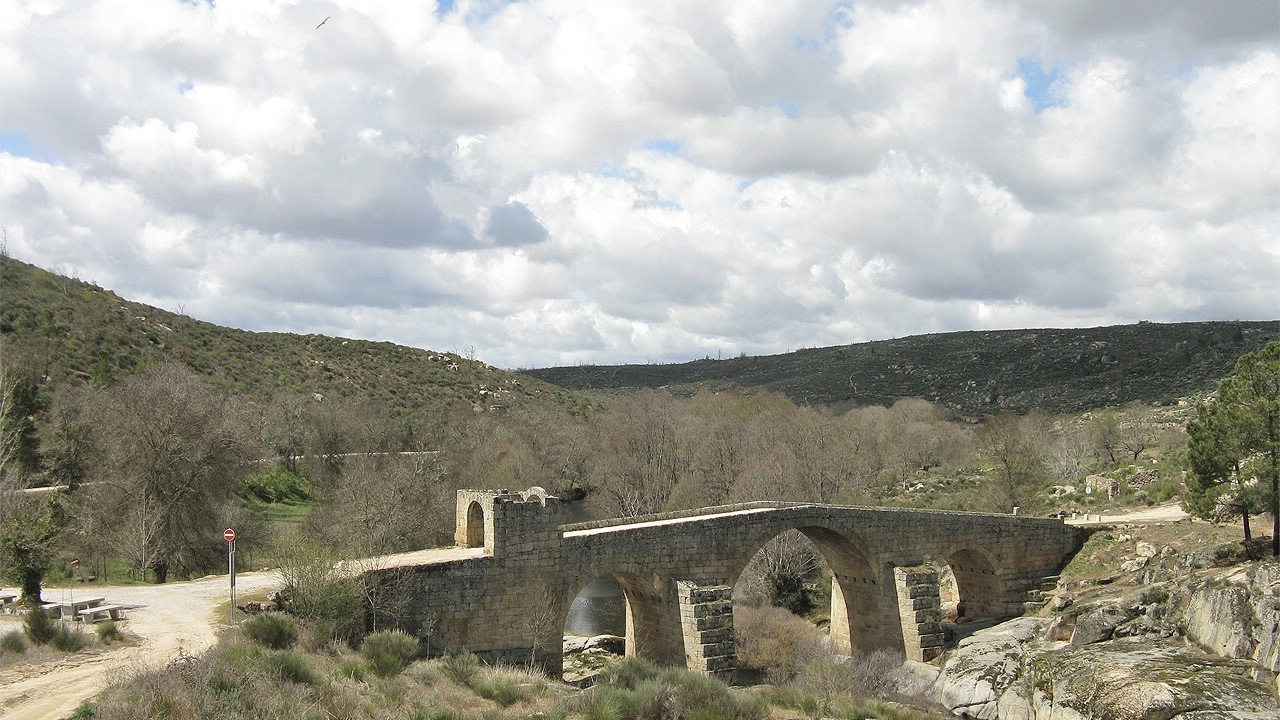
Sequeiros Bridge crossing the Côa River near Sabugal, (13th century).

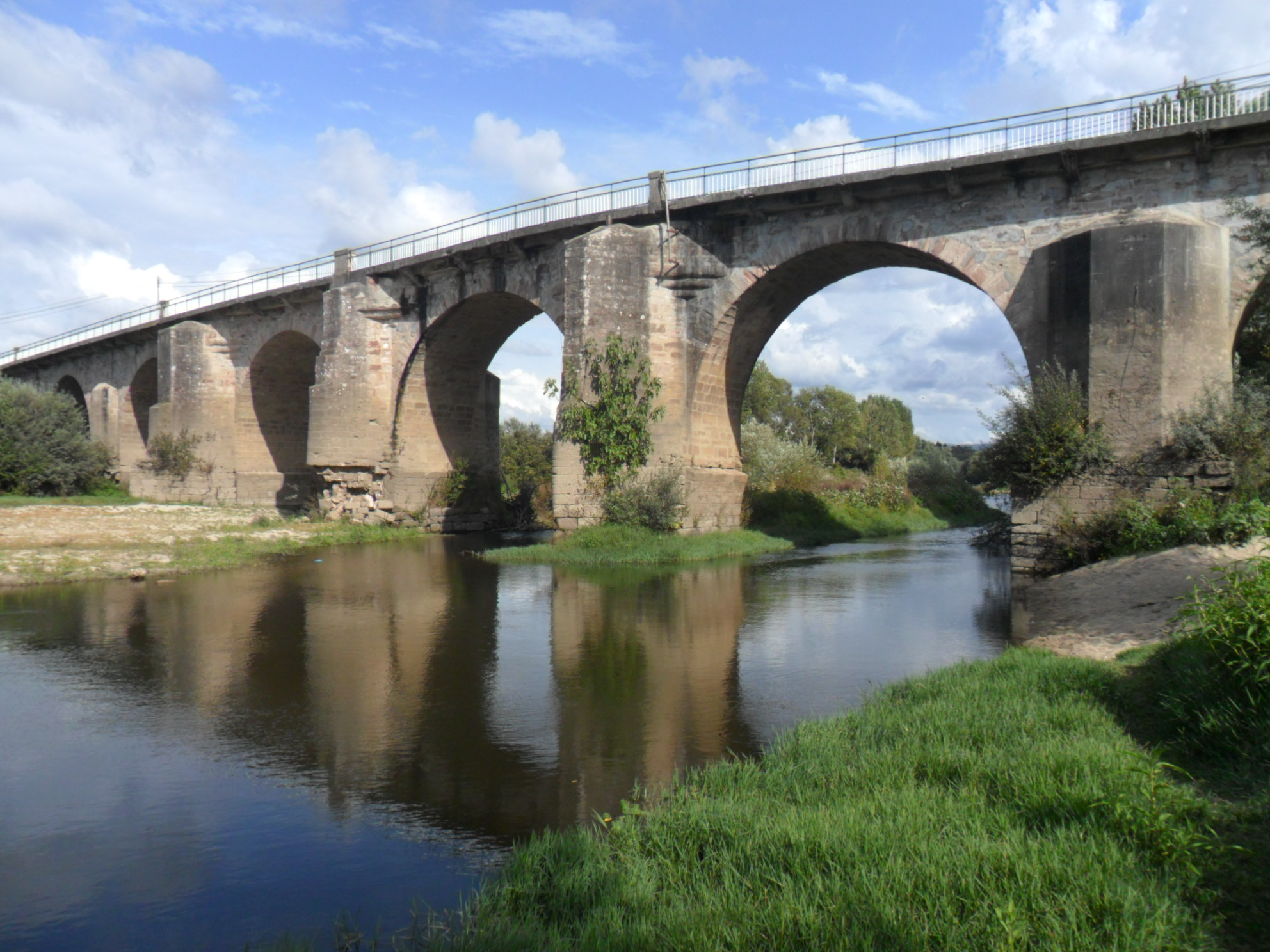
Old Vouga Bridge built in the 13th century crossing the Vouga River.

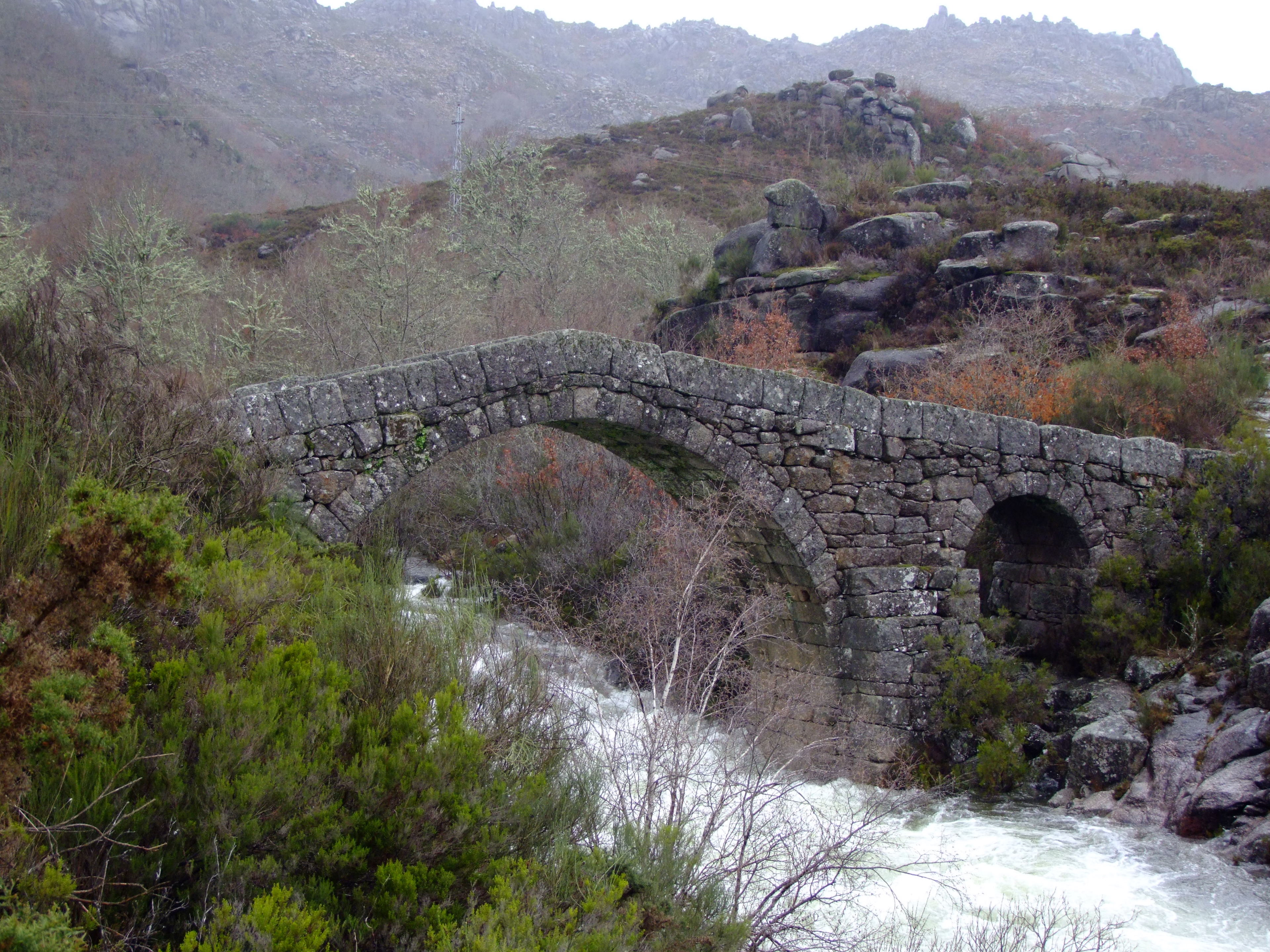
Cava da Velha Bridge, its central arch is originally Roman but a second one was added in the 13th century as well as its parapets.

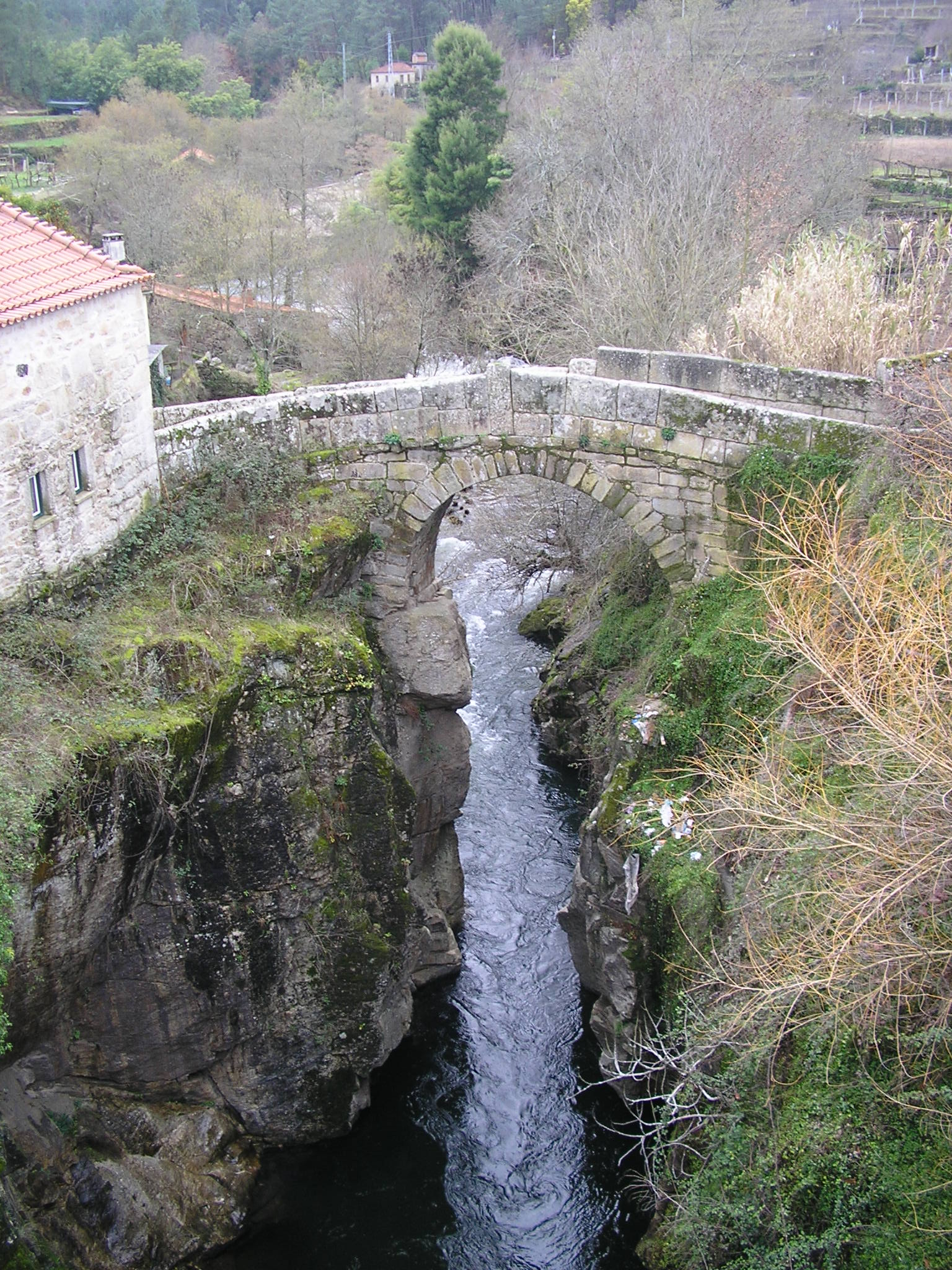
Barbeita Bridge (11th or 12th century), over Mouro River where King D.João I met with John of Gaunt, Duke of Lancaster in 1386.

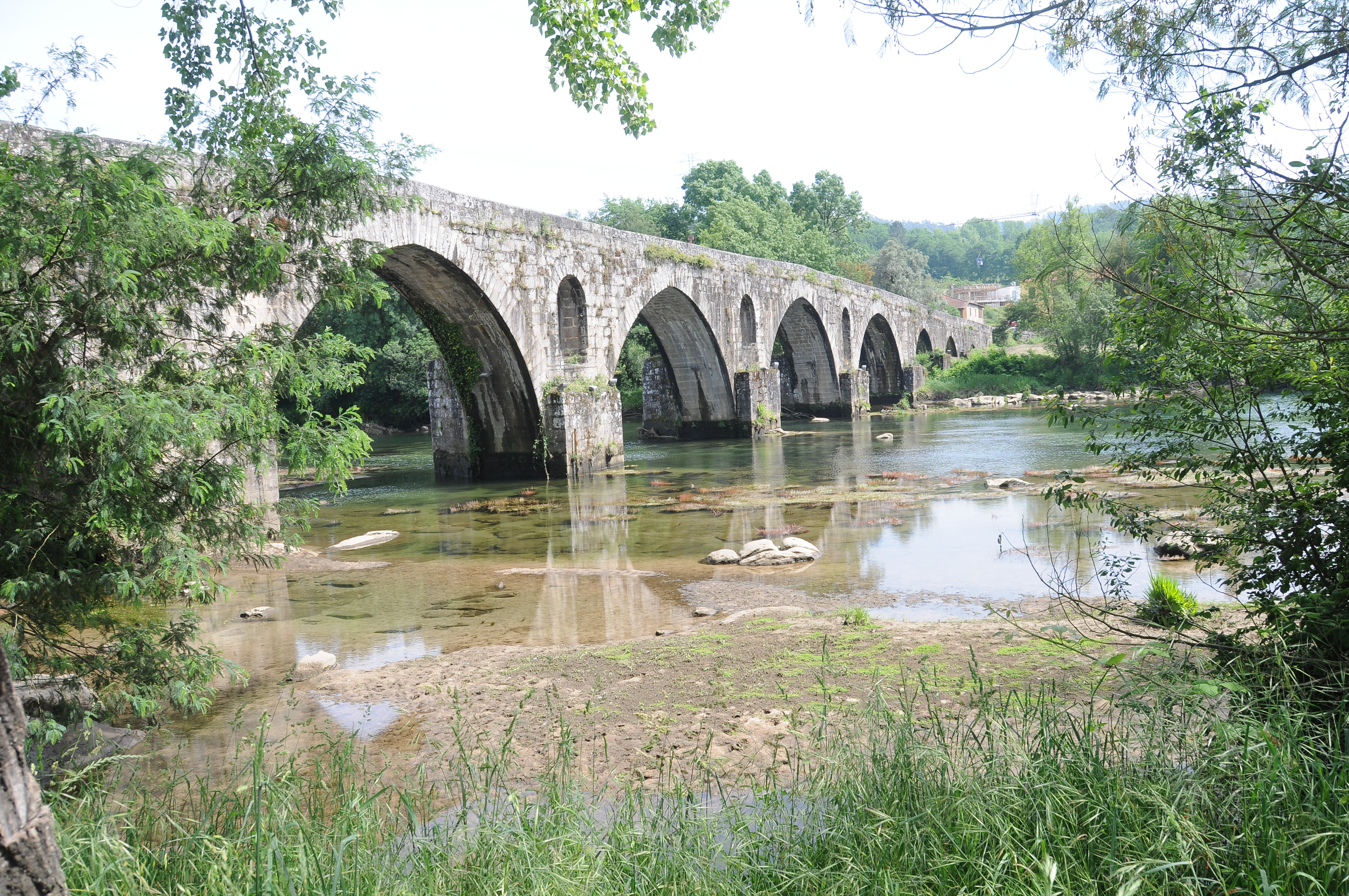
Porto Bridge over the Cávado River, built in the 11th century.

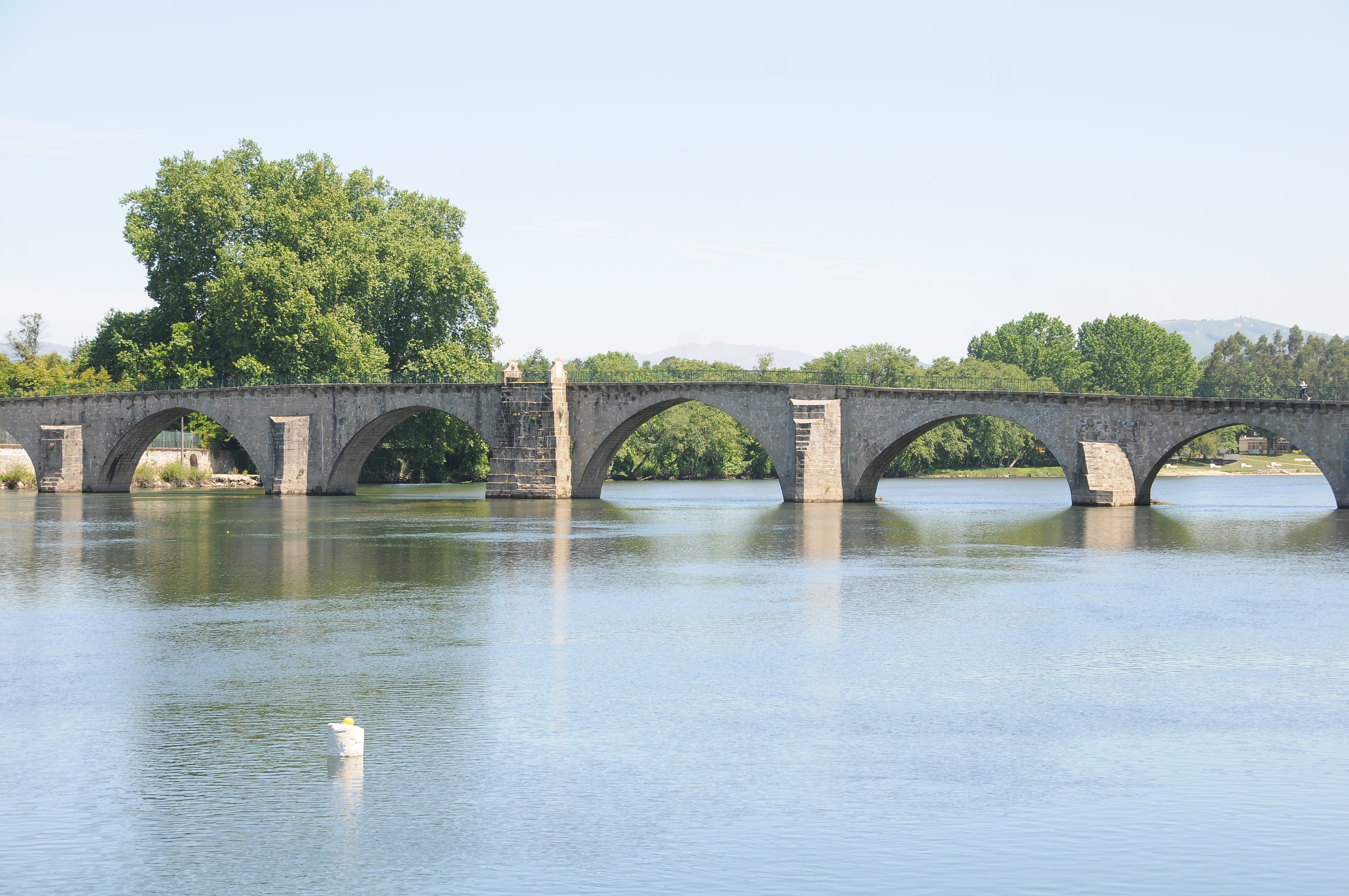
Prado Bridge over the Cávado River, although originally Roman it was rebuilt in the early 12th century.

=== Castles ===
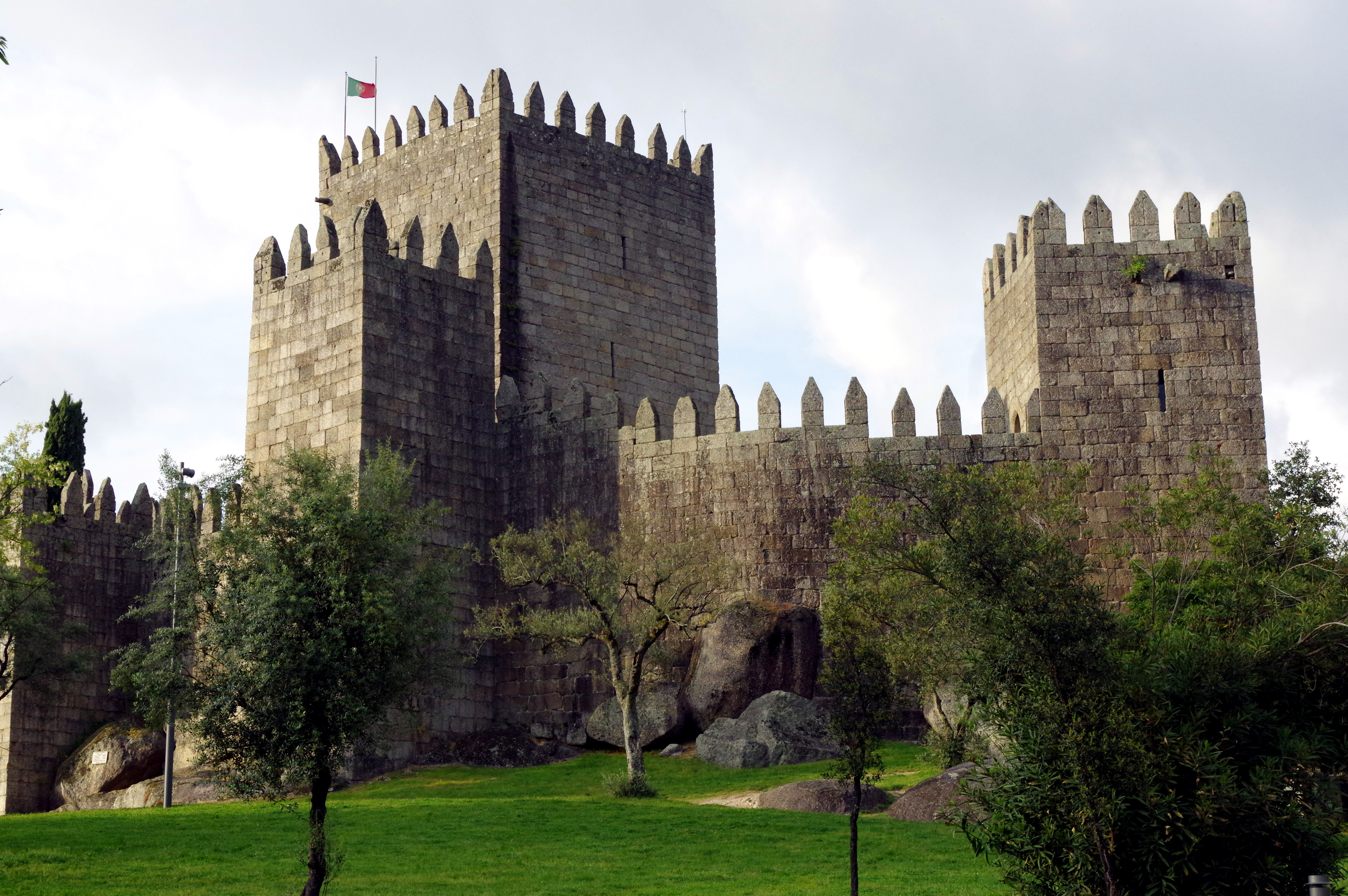
Guimarães Castle, built in the 10th century, its current look is the result of late 13th-century enlargements.

In Portugal, castles are directly related with military needs and the state of continuous warfare characterised by the Reconquista. Populations living closer of the border between Christians and Muslims were under threat of constant raids and the advance of either sides in pursue of territorial conquest. The region more precociously fortified was the area south of the Douro river, where in the 10th century almost all the population centers had their castle. The majority of these defensive positions, the rural castles, were of very simple structure and took advantage of natural conditions such as high places with granite outcrops, that made access difficult. During the next three centuries (10th to 13th centuries) we witness a boom of castles due to the ever-growing necessity to provide a territorial passive defense.

The strength of a Romanesque castle sits in the thickness and height of its walls in order to resist sieges. The Allure or round-path (Portuguese: Adarve) was intertwined with towers in order to break continuous cloths of wall and in the 12th century other outer sets of walls were built next to castles themselves to shelter populations and cattle as attested in the Castle of Castro Laboreiro.

The Romanesque castle testifies to the triumph of rural nobility and is also the symbol of a territory's safety. During this period it consisted of a wall with allures, battlements and a central tower: the Keep, symbol of feudal power, and the biggest innovation to the fortress. This element has its origins in the domus fortis, the strengthened noble residence.

Between the North and the South of Portugal, particularly in the regions defined by the margins of the Mondego and Tejo Rivers, there are notable differences in military structures. In the North castles have a more basic structure and are very tied to fortifications typified in pre-Romanesque era. Going southwards castles display more advanced techniques in the field of military architecture. The strategic area was then concentrated on the border with the Moors where the Military Orders would play a key role. In the North we can find the castles of Lanhoso, Castro Laboreiro, Lindoso, Melgaço, Arnoia, Pena de Aguiar, Trancoso, Vilar Maior, and the most outstanding Guimarães Castle. This fortress, documented since around 950 AD, had undergone restoration works during the reign of D.Afonso Henriques and later changes in its layout in the Gothic period.

Built under the tenure of Gualdim Pais as Master of the Knights Templar (1157–1195), the castles of Pombal (c.1156), Tomar (1160), Monsanto (1165), Penas Roias (1166), Almourol (1171) and Longroiva (1174) demonstrate the importance of the Templars in the development of Portuguese military architecture during the second half of the 12th century. The first document stating the Knights Templar presence in Portugal dates back to 1128, when Queen D.Teresa donated them the castle of Soure. Its keep, built on the north side of the fortress, retains a distinctive feature: the Alambor, a reinforced base for the tower using a stone-slanted ramp. This solution gives it greater strength and makes an assault on its walls harder to accomplish. This feature can also be seen in the Keep of Pombal Castle.

At Tomar Castle, headquarters of the order in Portugal, the alambor was built along the outer walls of the fortification. With origins in the military architecture developed by the Crusaders in the Holy Land, this constructive technique was used in the castle of Saône and the Krak des Chevaliers, both located in Syria, where Gualdim Pais was stationed between 1151 and 1156. It owns to the Templar Order some of the most innovative solutions that the Portuguese military architecture met throughout the 12th century.

Castles

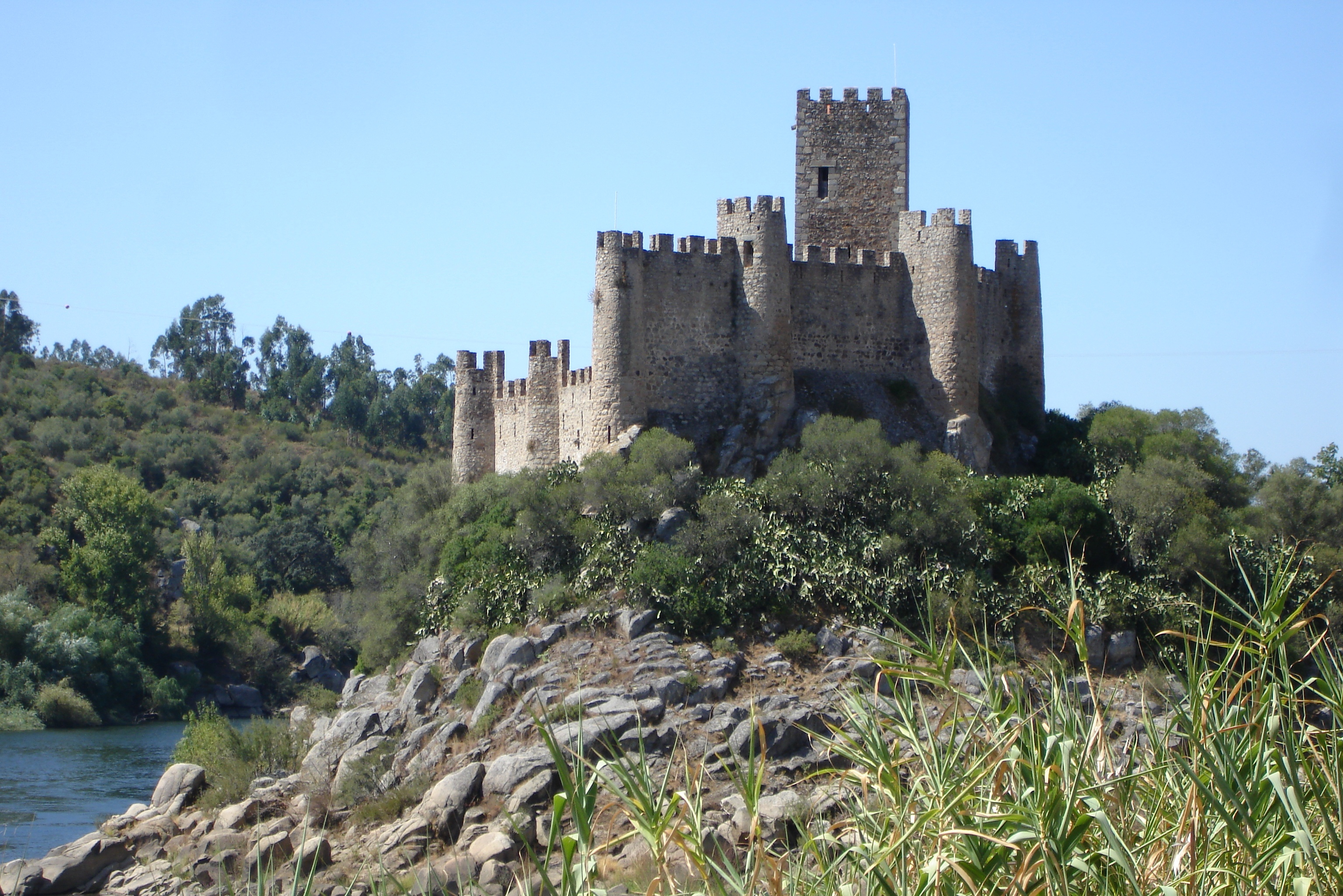
Almourol Castle, rebuilt by 1171, it stands on a small islet in the Tejo River.

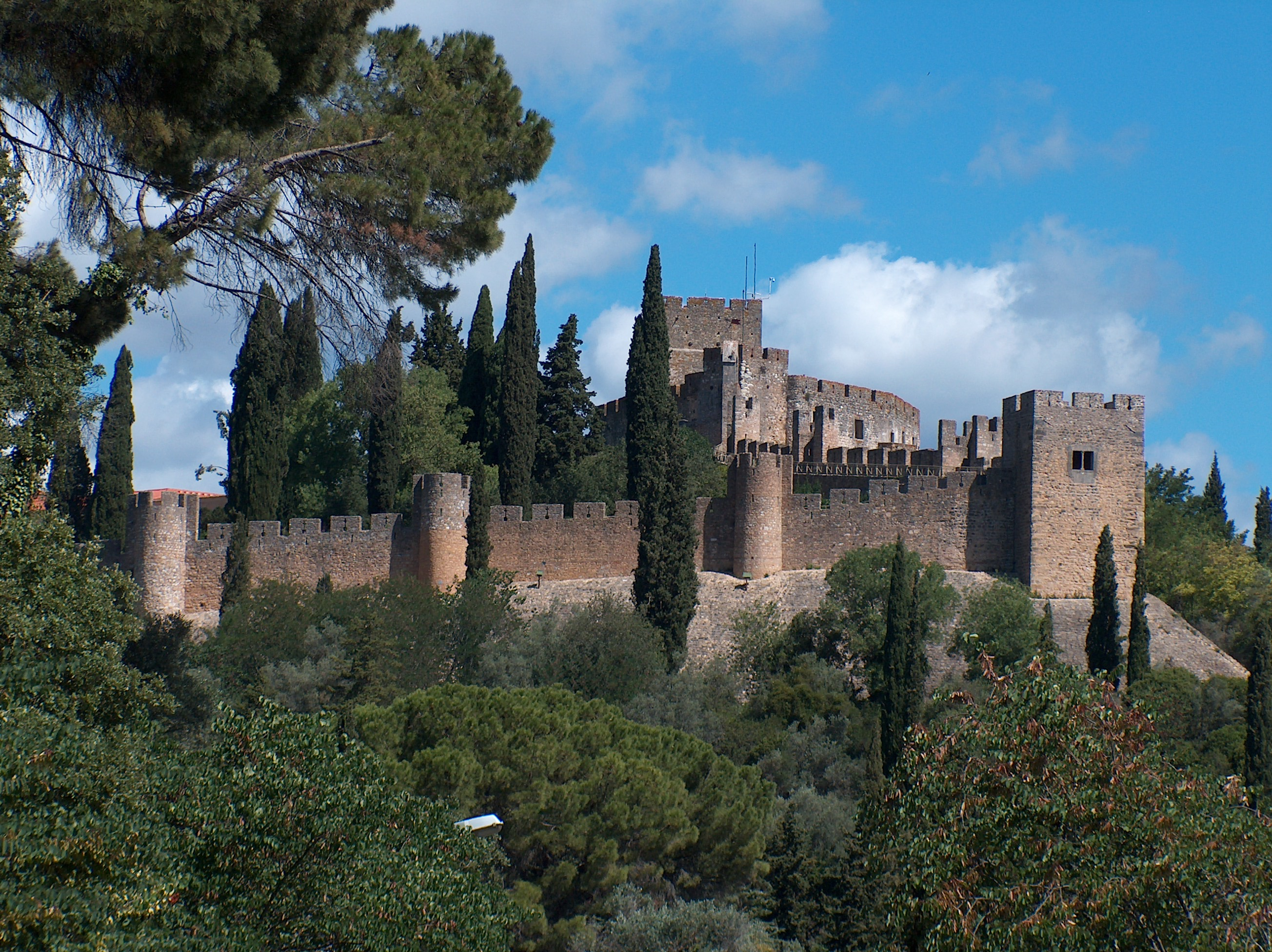
The alambor at Tomar Castle, a novelty brought to Portugal from the Holy Land by the Knights Templar.

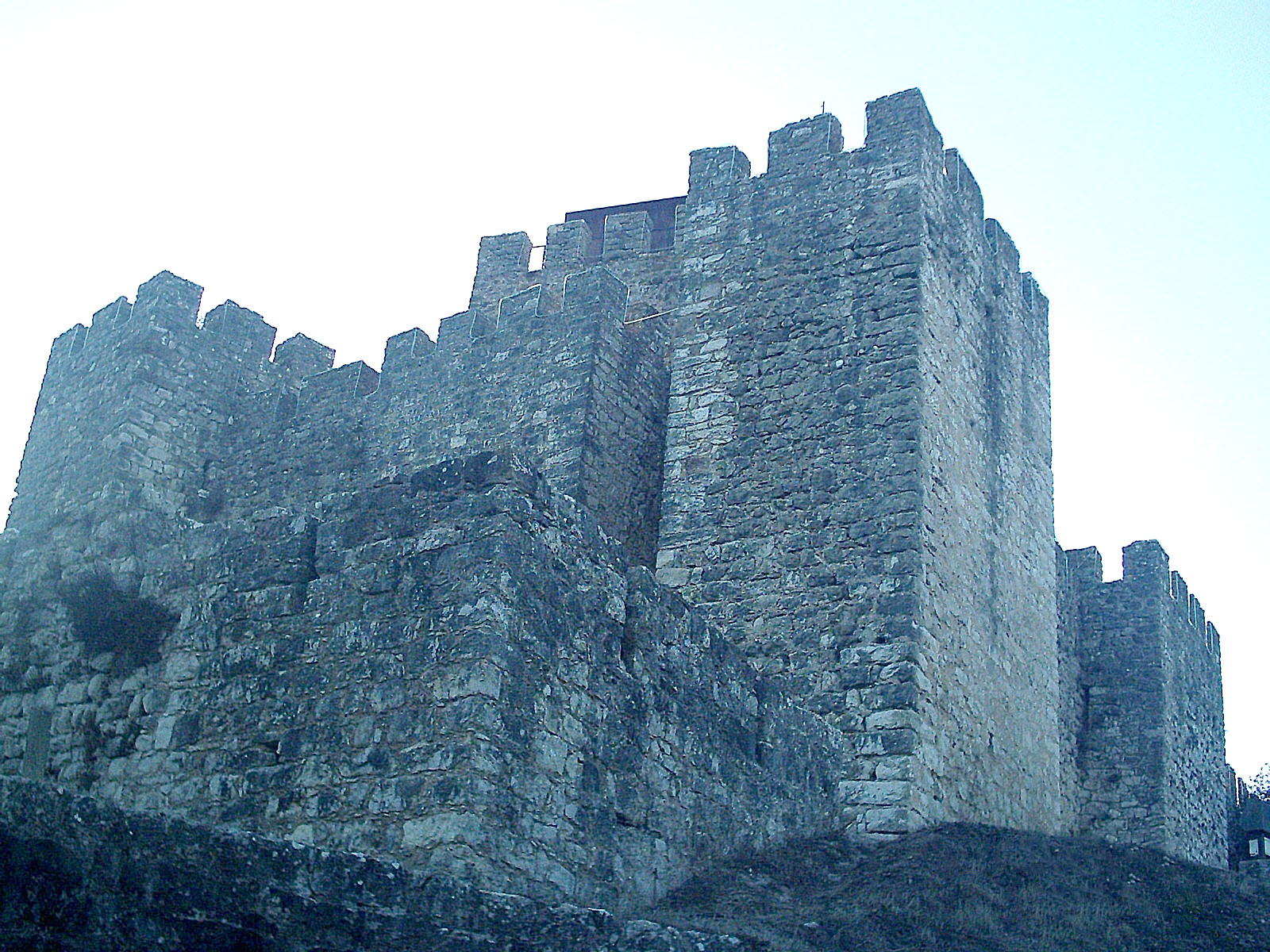
Thick walls and towers of Pombal Castle.

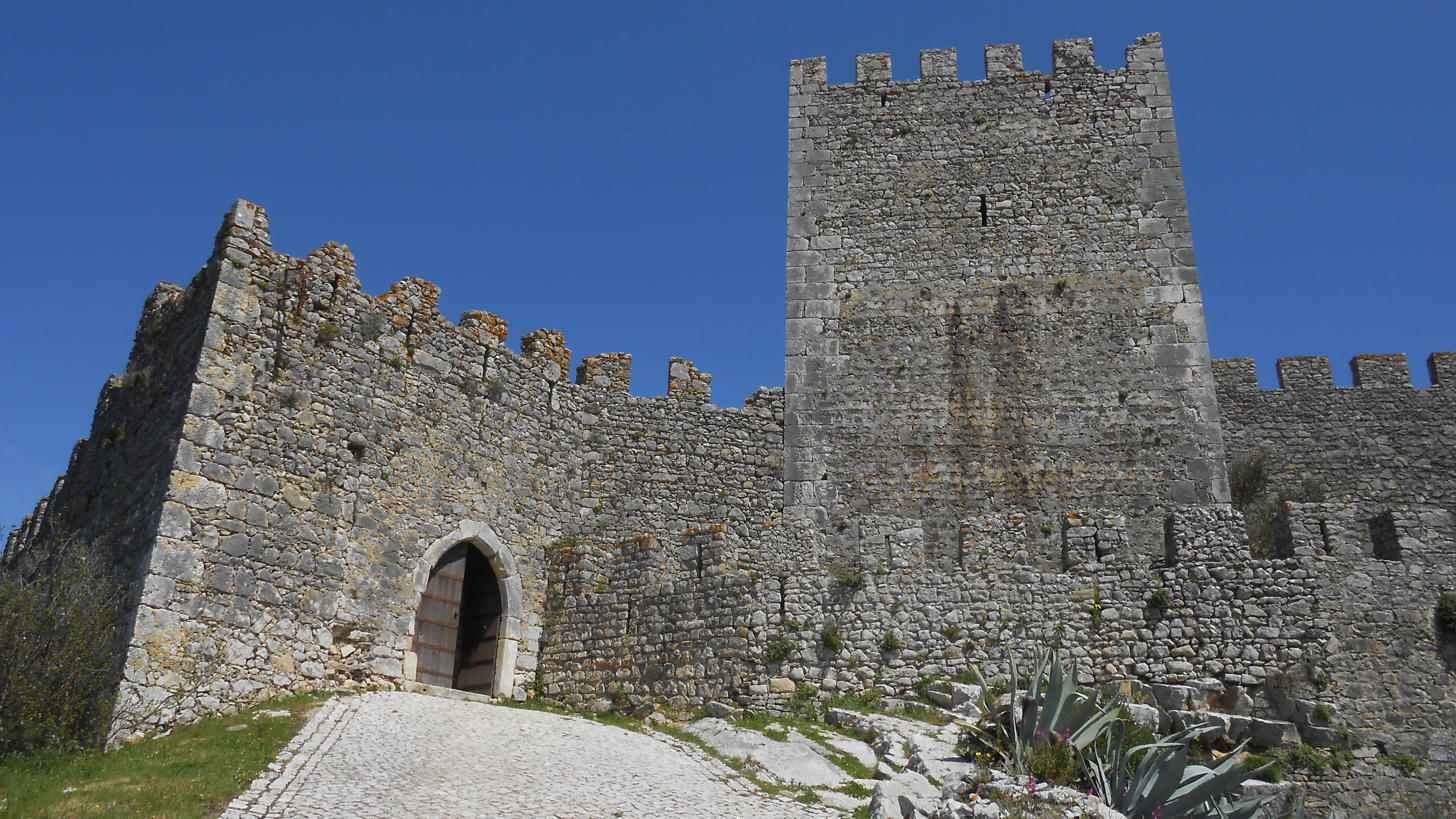
Montemor-o-Velho Castle, built in the 11th century.

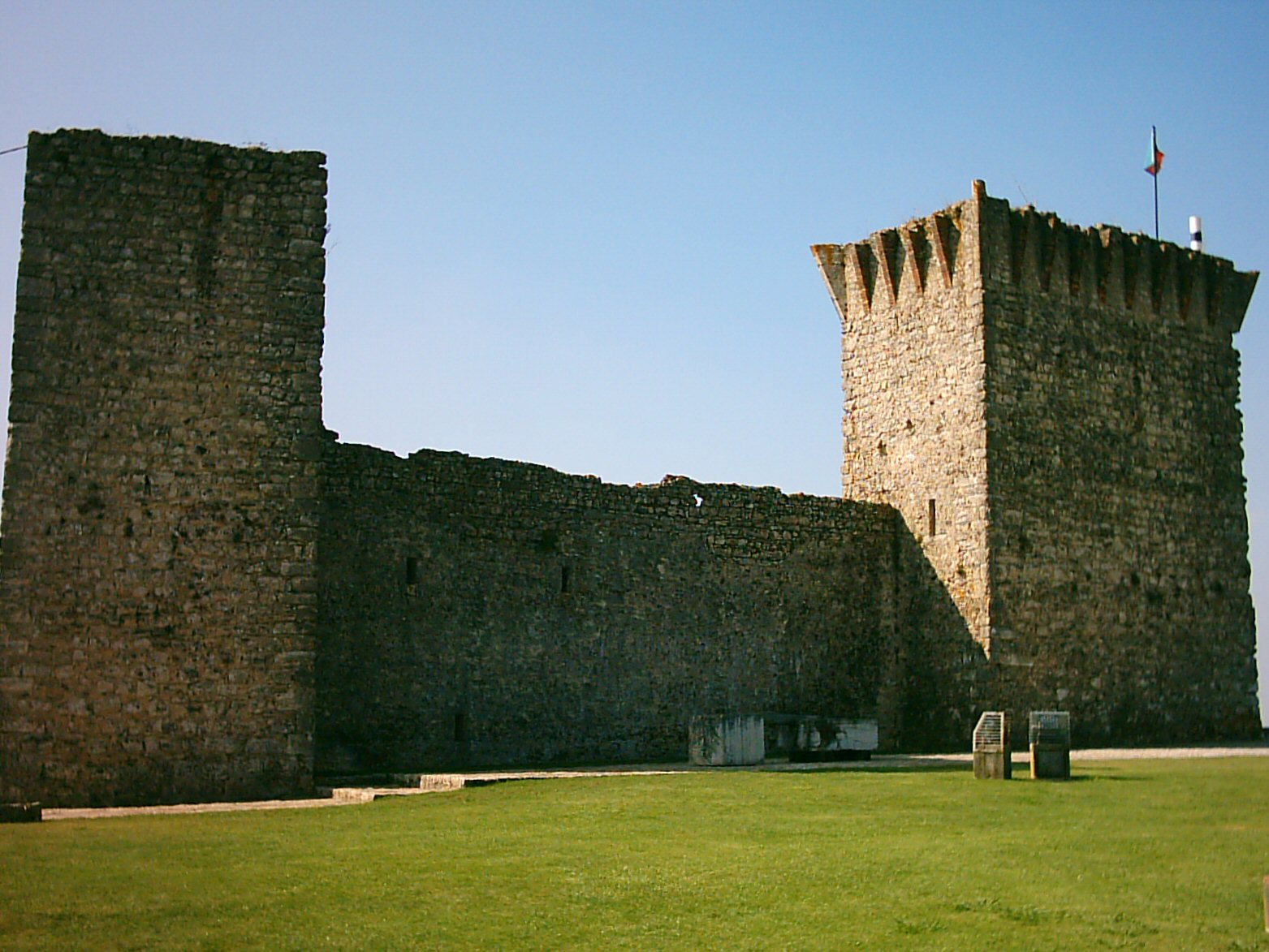
The first reference to Ourém Castle dates back to 1178.

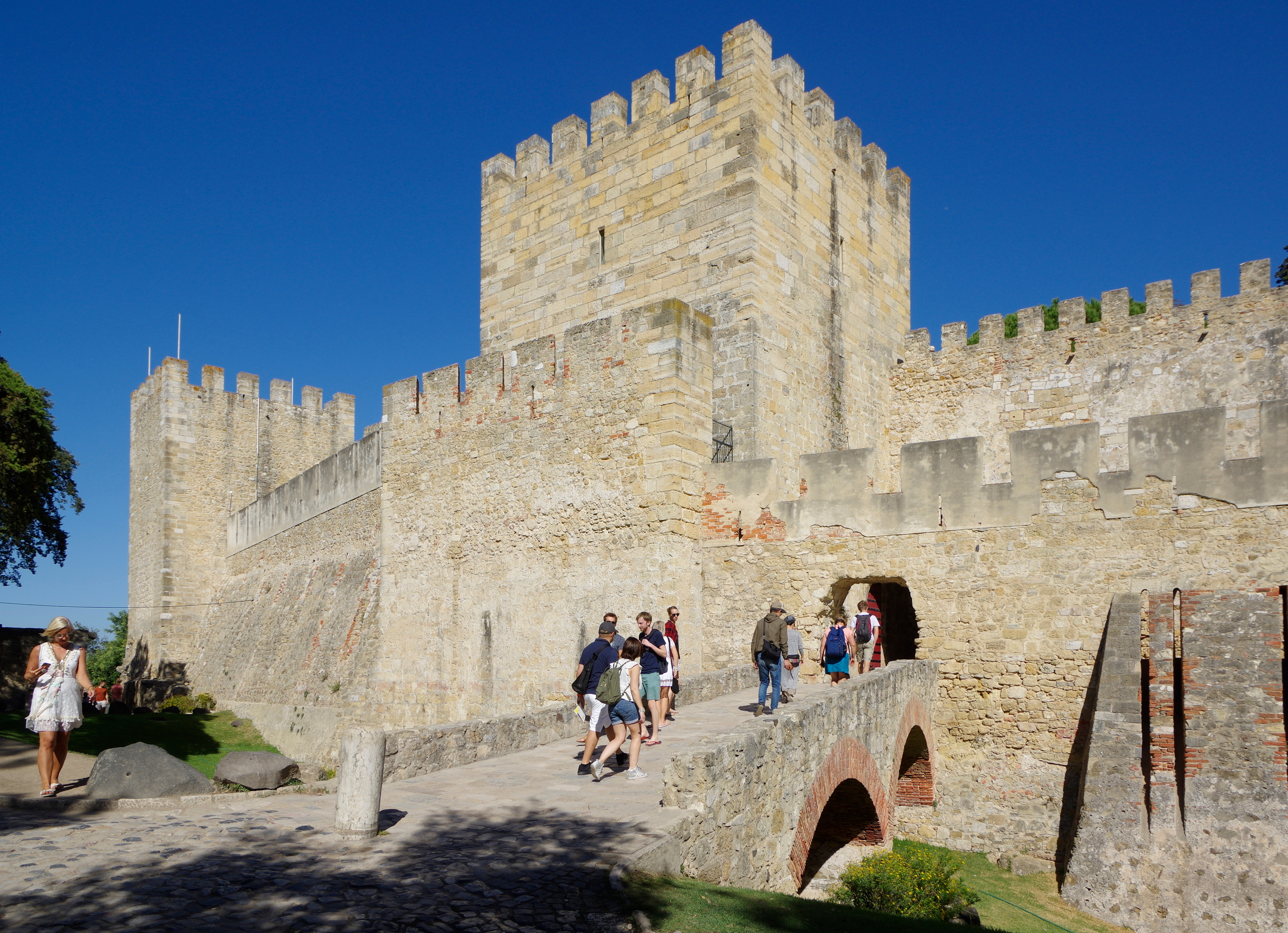
Bridge entrance at São Jorge Castle in Lisbon.

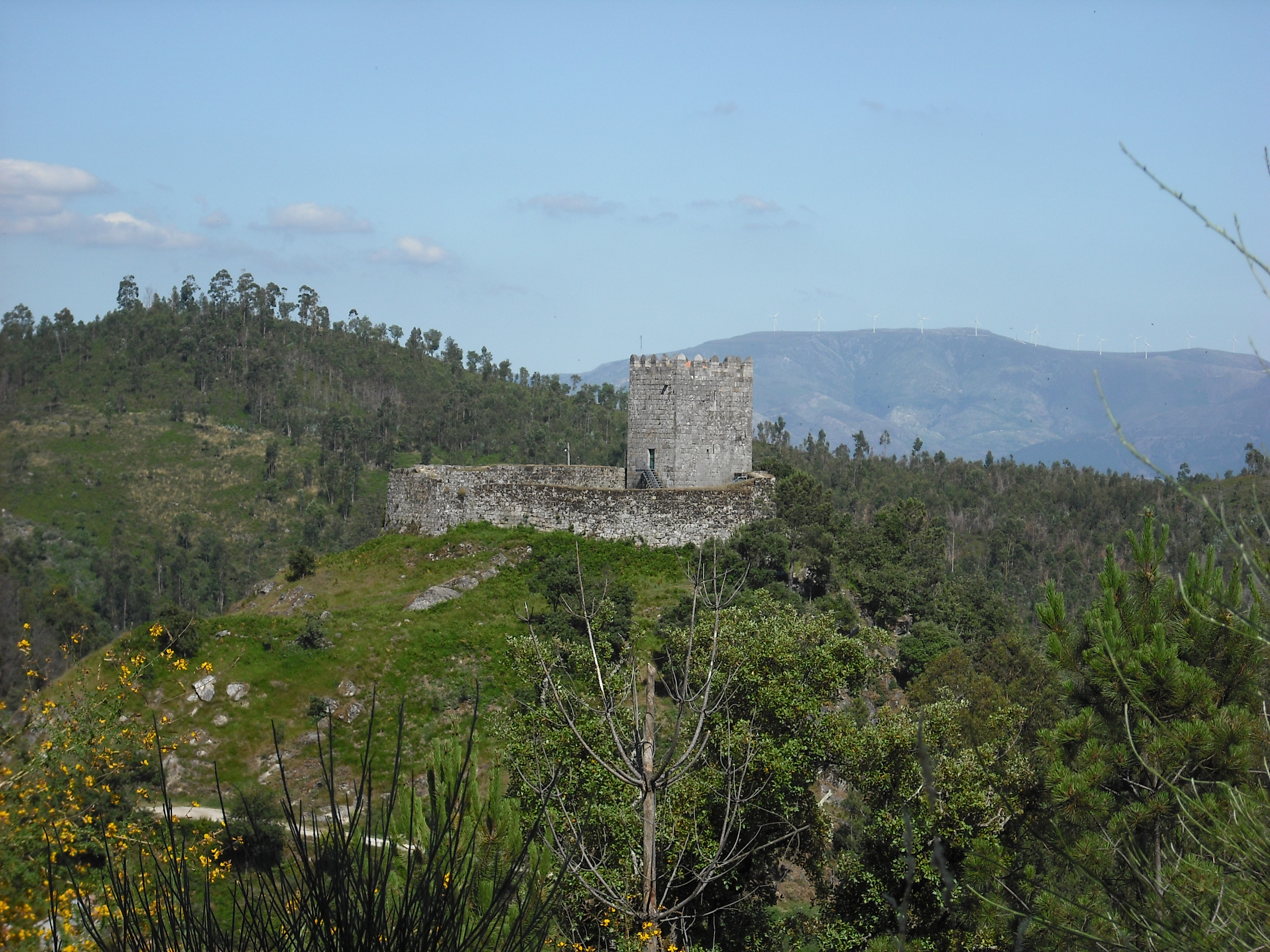
Arnoia Castle, built in the late 11th century, offered protection to a nearby monastery.

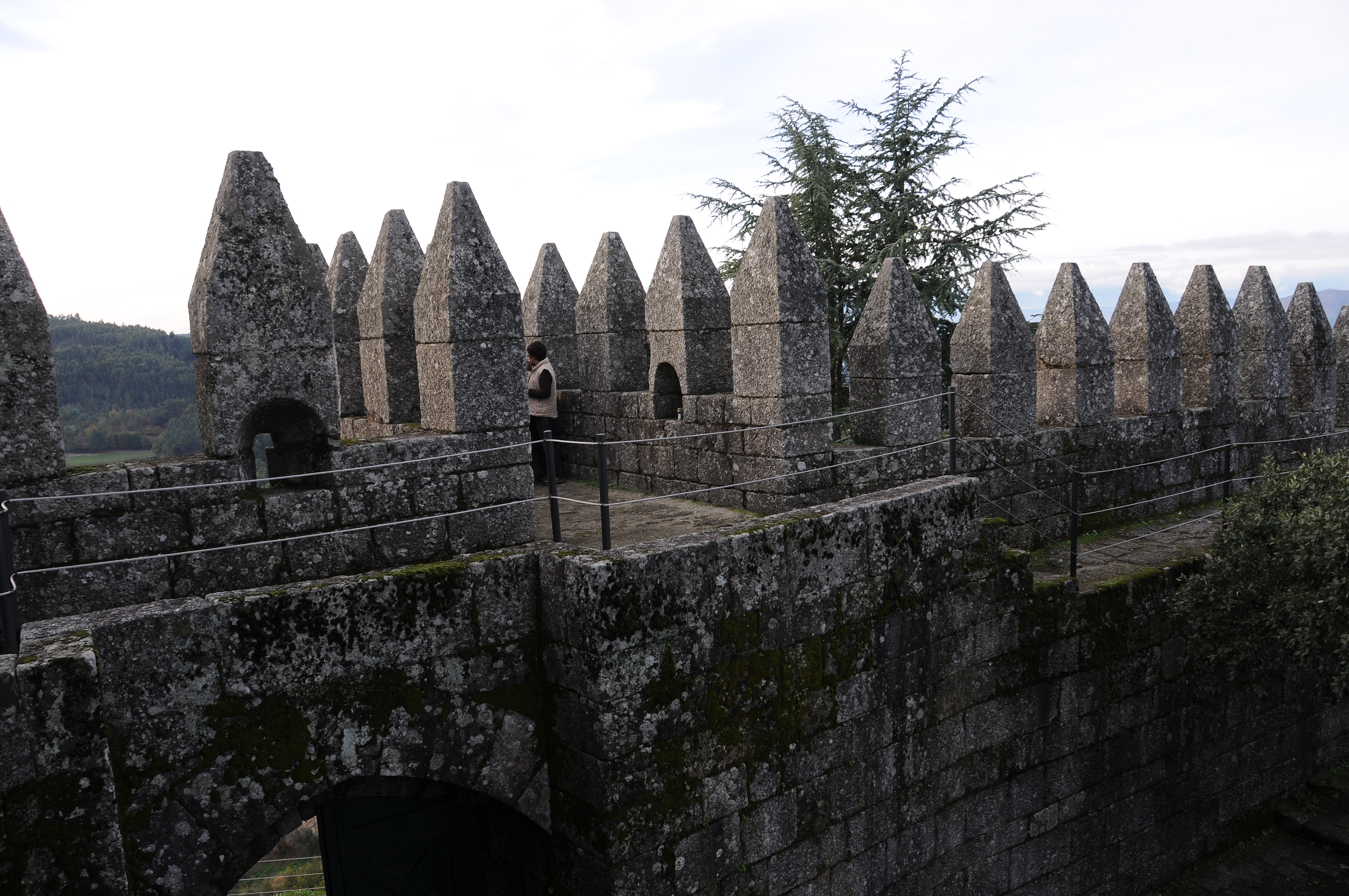
Battlements and the round-path at Póvoa de Lanhoso Castle, late 11th century.

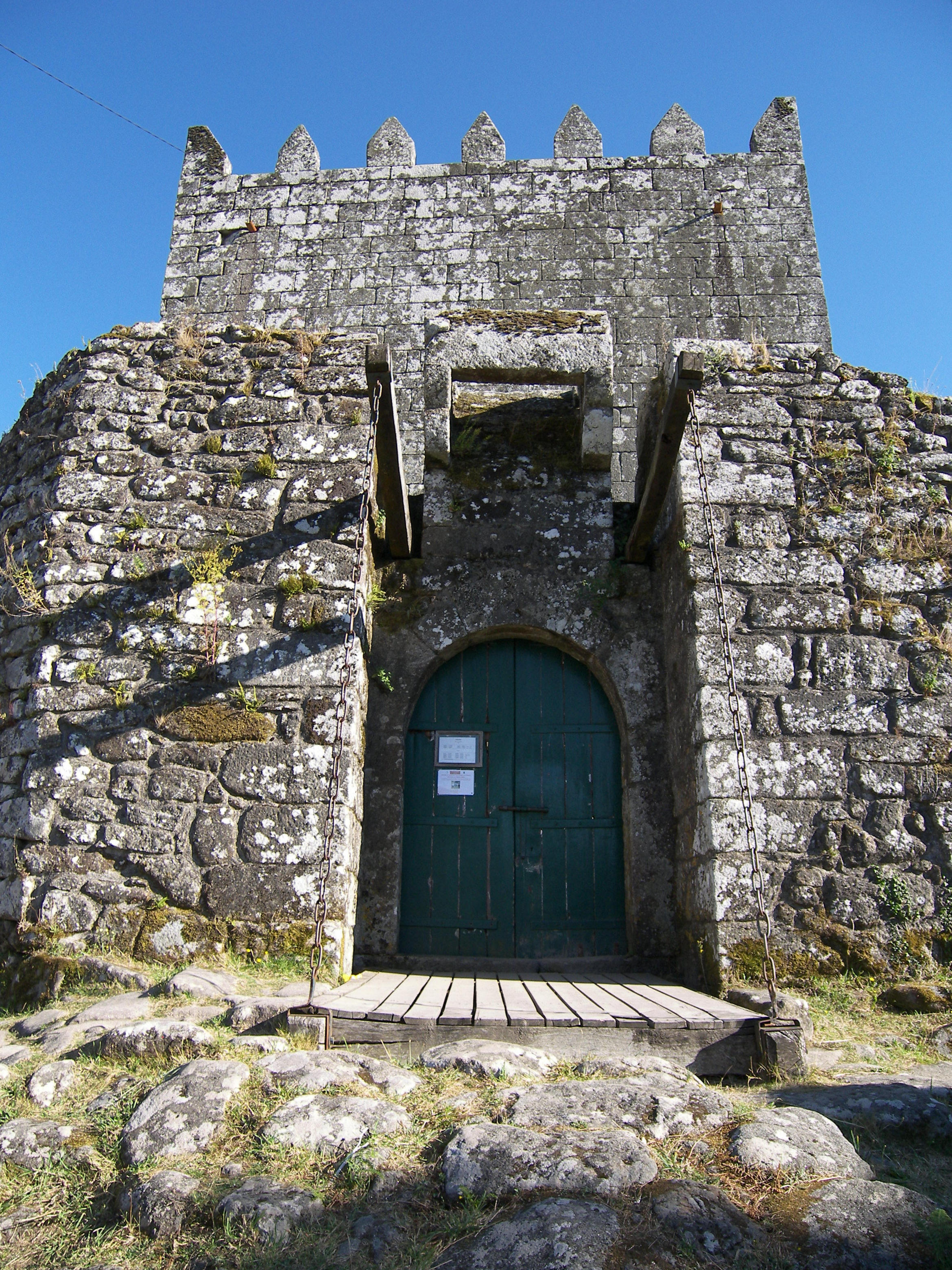
Main gate of Lindoso Castle and its drawbridge.

== Transition to Gothic architecture ==
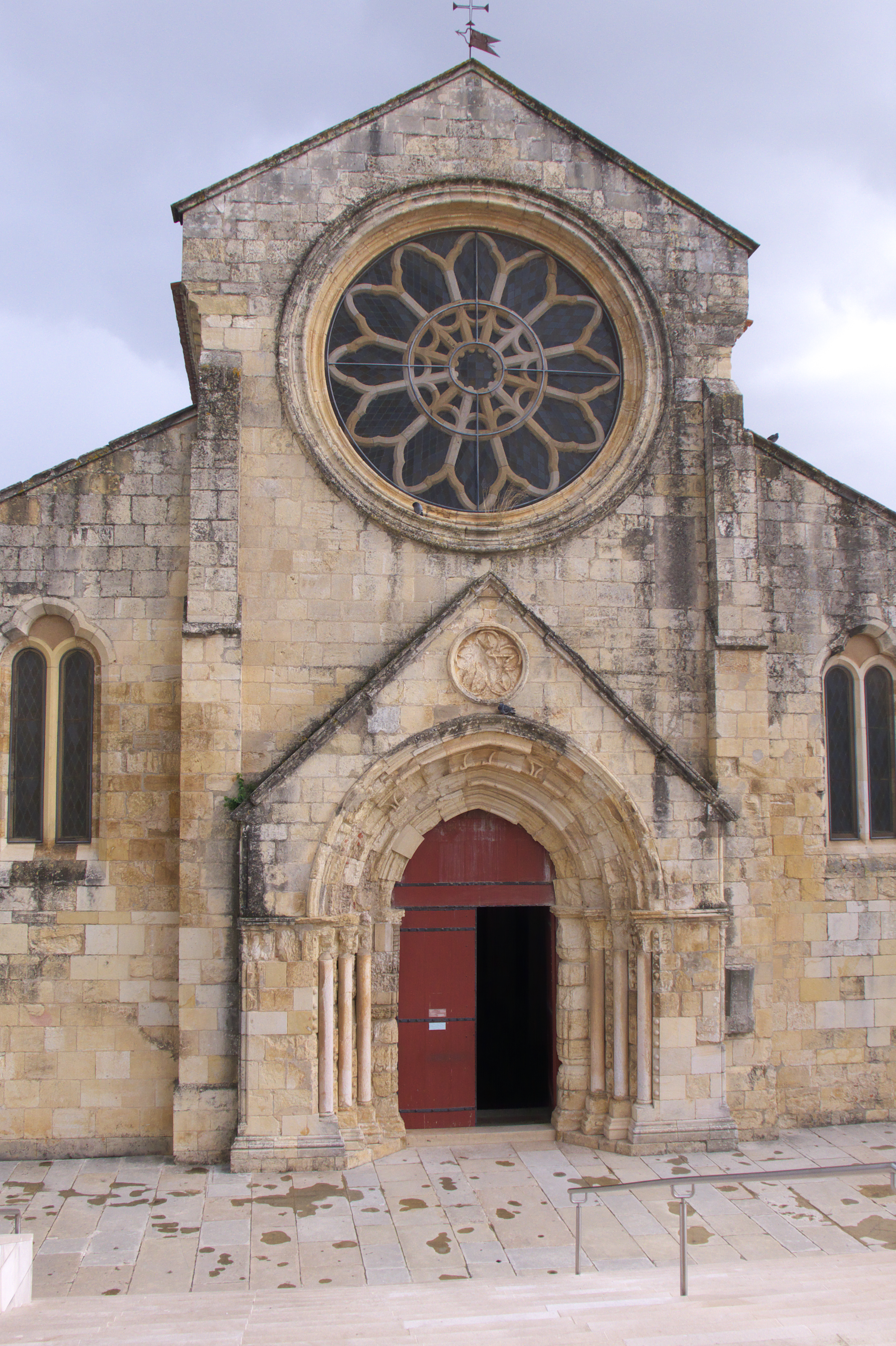
Church of Santa Maria do Olival, built by the Knights Templar around 1170, was one of the first buildings reflecting the newly arrived Gothic architecture maintaining a Romanesque structural shape.

The arrival of the Cistercians in Portugal after 1142 coincided with the first steps on the development of the new Gothic artistical style in France. Those initial Gothic features (pointed arch, taller and slimmer columns, groin and rib vaults, flying buttresses and more windows), although still with much Romanesque flavour, were implemented in Cistercian abbeys as they matched the exact kind of austere and ascetic teachings preached by their leader and mentor Saint Bernard of Clairvaux.

Thus, in Portugal, the strong presence and popularity of Romanesque until later centuries meant that this decorative and architectural Cistercian model was the perfect basis for the slow change into Gothic style, without never completely cutting off with the previous Romanesque. Instead, these two styles merged in Portuguese architecture like nowhere else in Europe within a specific kind called Mendicant Gothic, typical of monastic buildings. Alcobaça, one of the biggest Cistercian abbeys in the world, is the first fully Gothic building in Portugal, but it still has a heavy and austere exterior appearance, only balanced by its tall and massive rib vaulted central nave and aisles. Churches like Santa Maria dos Olivais in Tomar, or São João de Alporão in Santarém are perfect examples of this Mendicant transitional period between the Romanesque and the definitive settle of Gothic style, which would only be a reality by the 14th and 15th centuries.

Évora Cathedral is another example of Romanesque/Gothic transition, combining both in a single monument. Built between 1186 and 1204 (but only fully completed by 1250) with a clear Romanesque outlook, it was again enlarged c. 1280–1340, this time in early Gothic style. The cathedral received several valuable additions through time, such as the cloisters (Gothic period – 14th century), or its zimborium (dome), built in the late 13th century and another addition already showing the new Gothic features.

Romanesque never truly ceased to be expressed in various ways both decorative and structural until as late as the 16th century, thus most historians name it as Resistance Romanesque, referring to a specific kind of buildings that present a very marked statement of this period even if mixed with later artistical styles (Gothic, Manueline, Renaissance). Some examples of those are the Churches of Caminha, (built in the late 15th century), Torre de Moncorvo (built in the early 16th century), and the Cathedral of Viana do Castelo (also from the 15th century).

Romanesque/Gothic-transition buildings

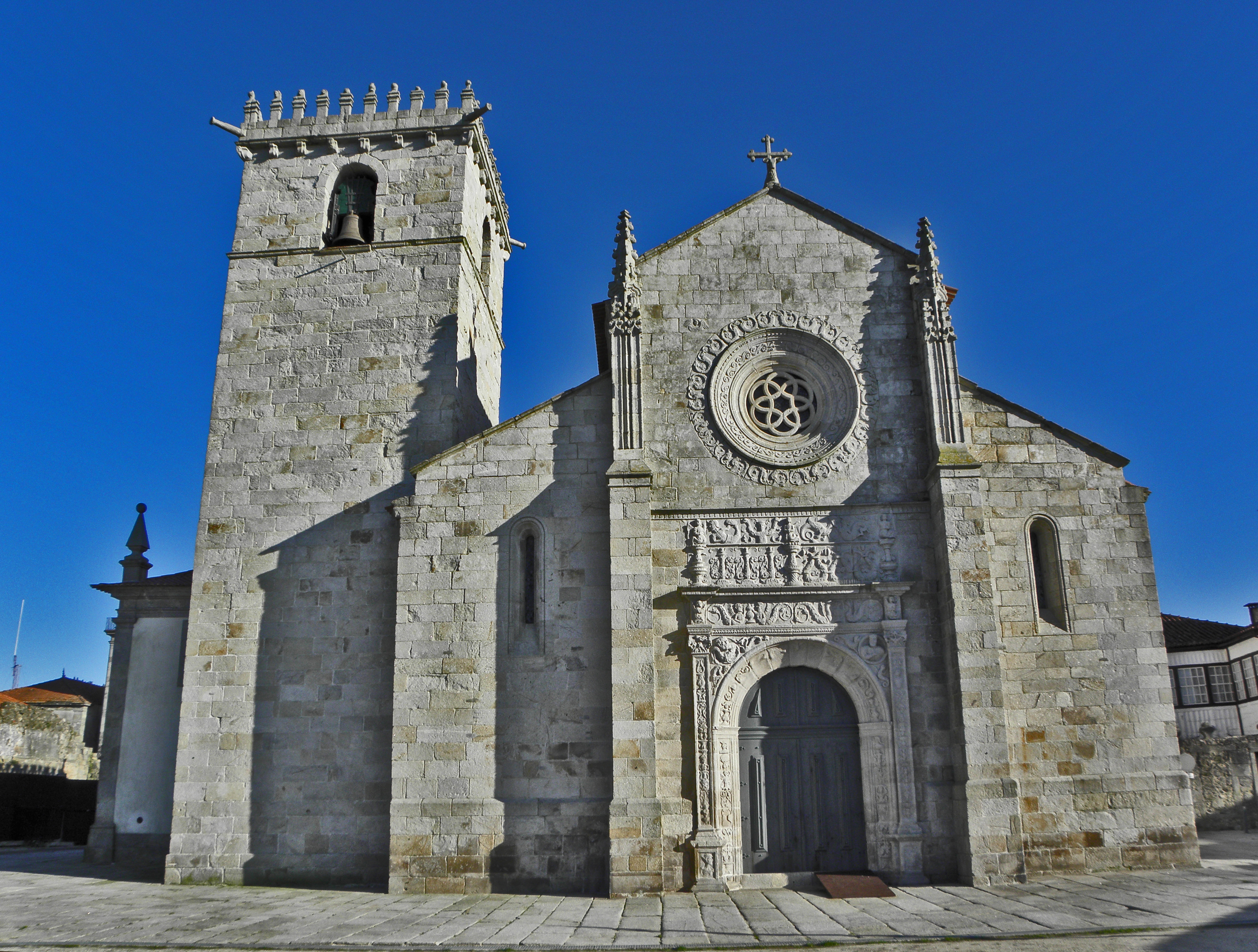
Church of Caminha (15th/16th centuries). Its Gothic and Manueline decorative motifs and Renaissance portal are flanked by a heavy Romanesque-like bell tower.

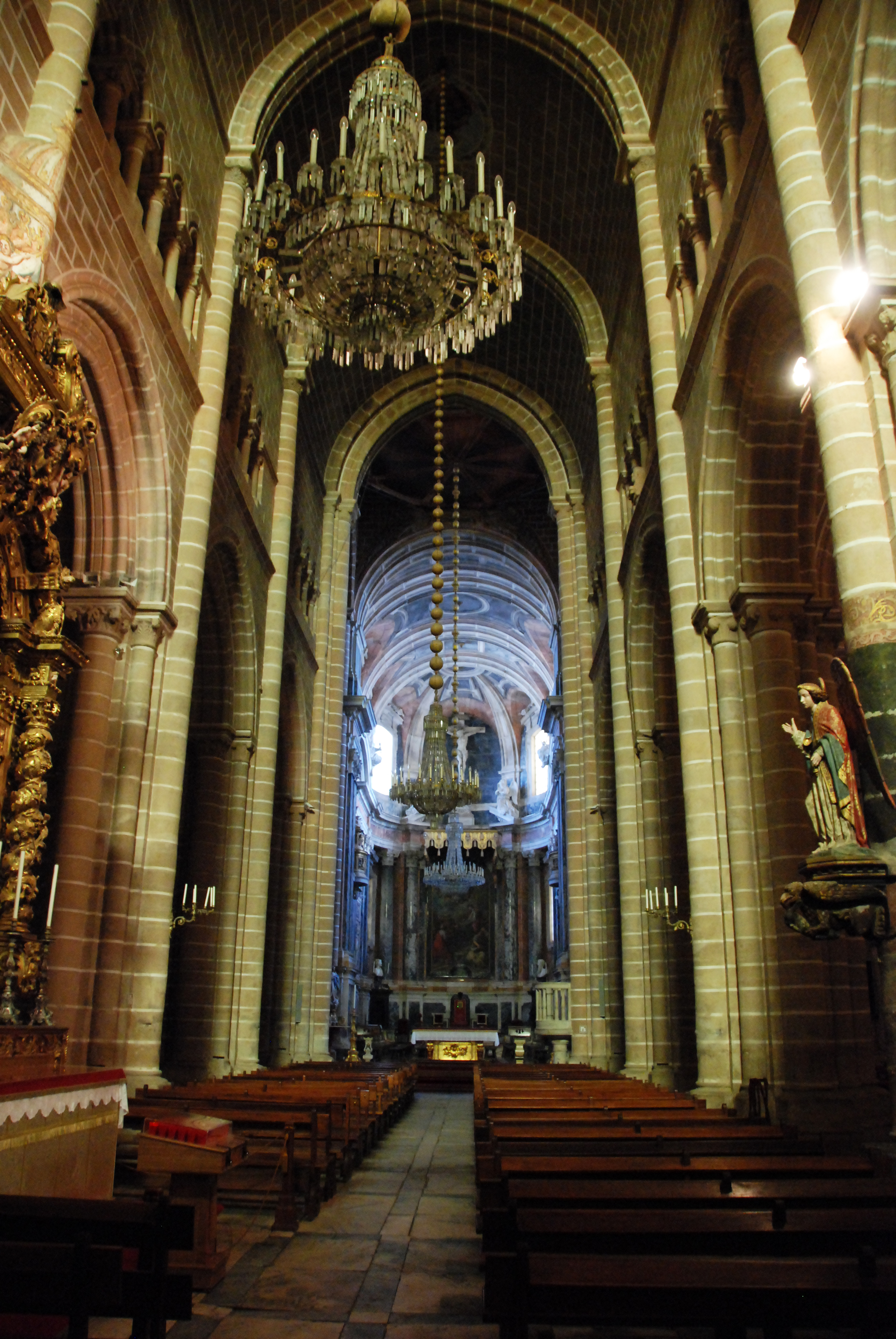
The nave of Évora Cathedral already has a Gothic-kind pointed barrel vault.

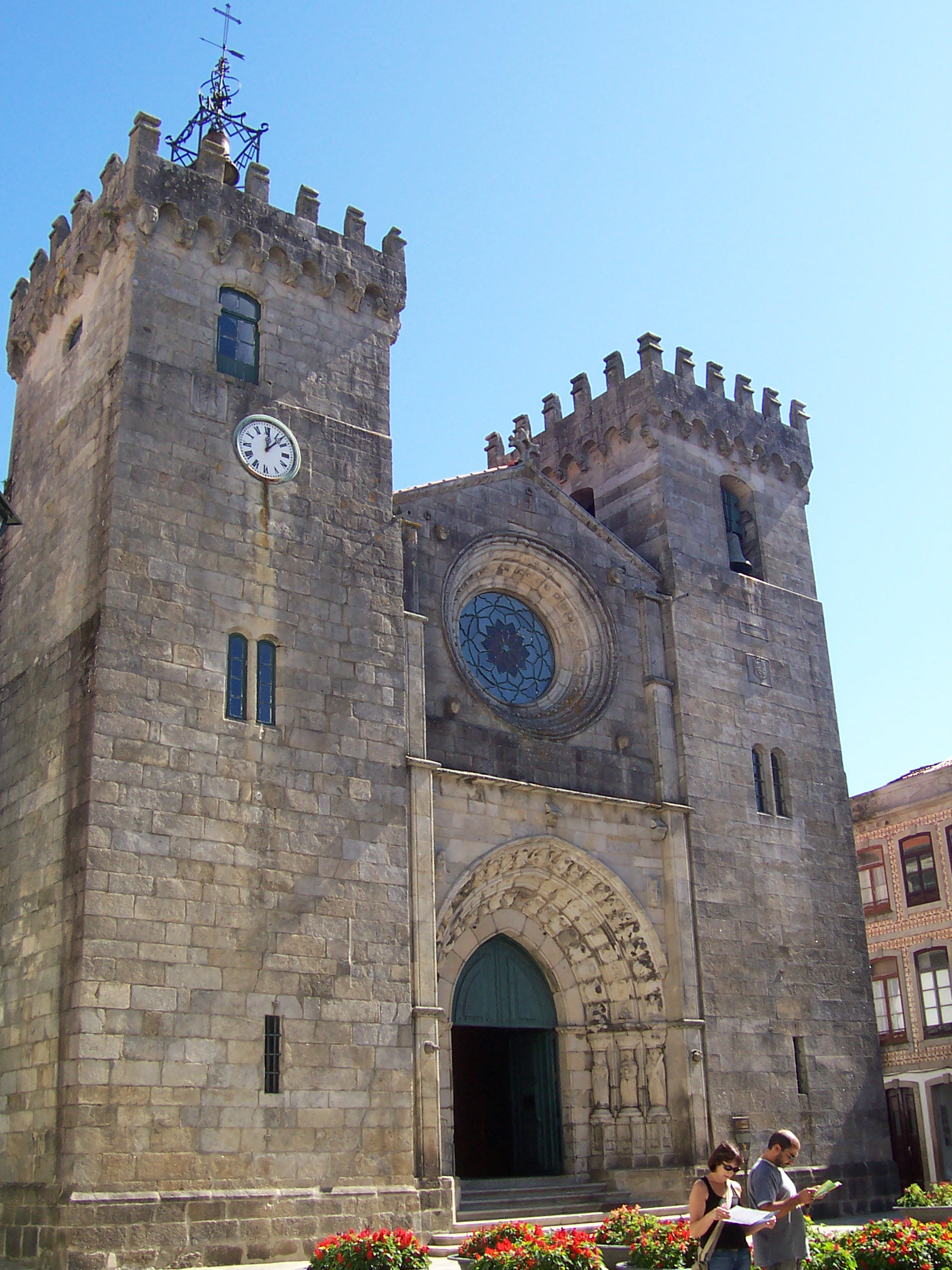
Viana do Castelo Cathedral (15th century). A magnificent Gothic portal is flanked by two heavy towers.

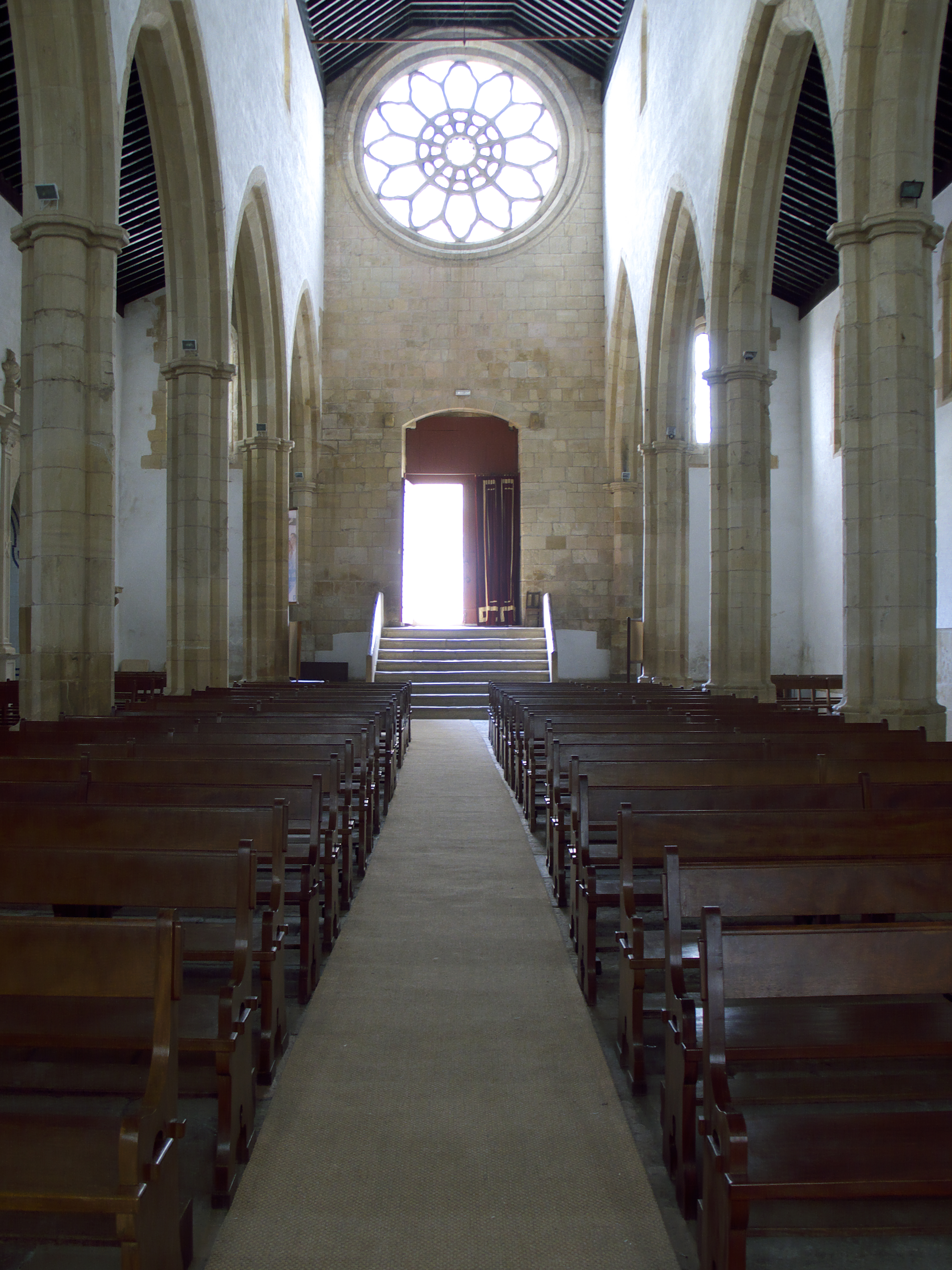
Nave of the Church of Santa Maria do Olival.

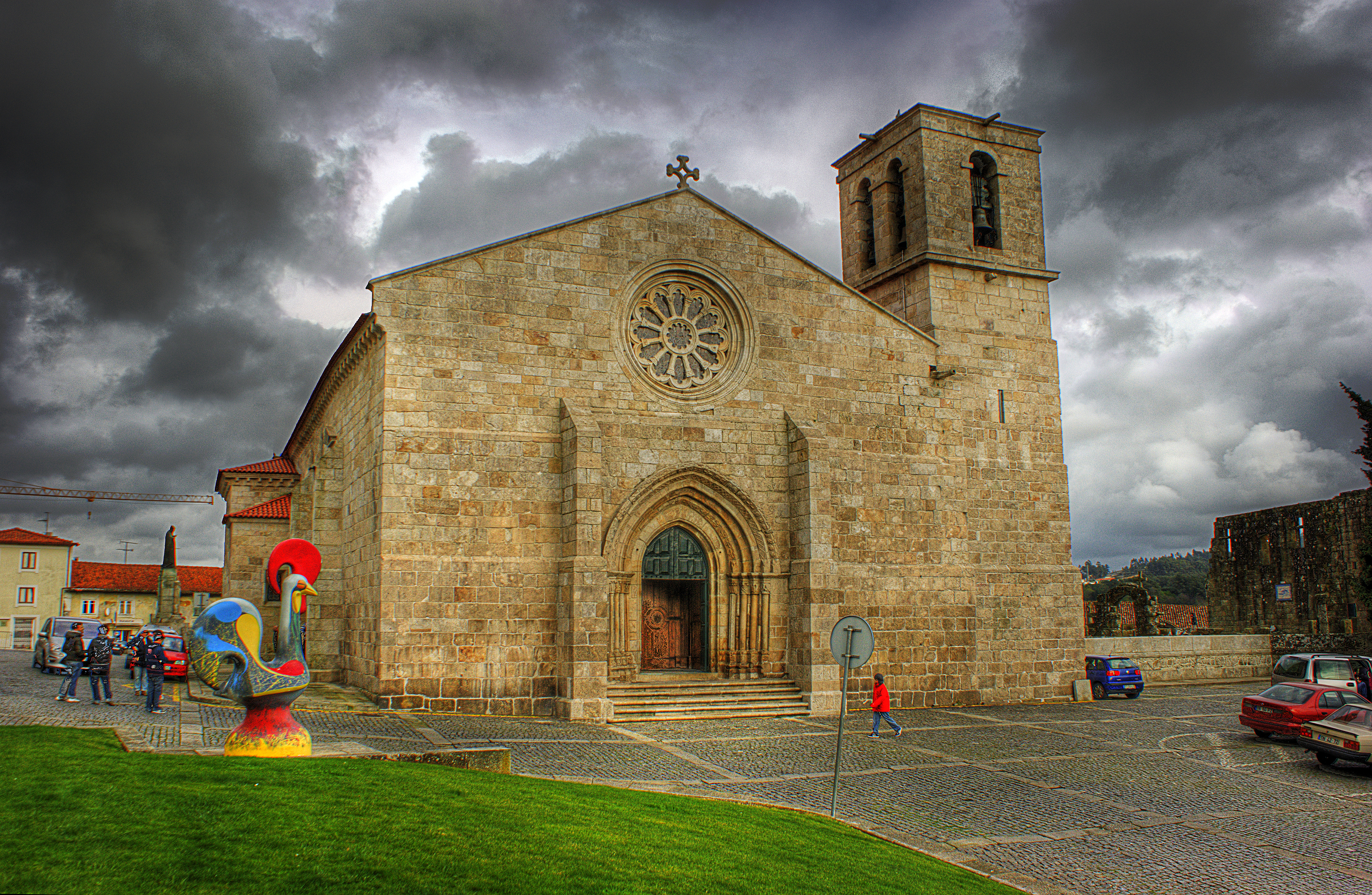
Santa Maria de Barcelos Church (late 13th century). Its Romanesque facade shows a Gothic portal and rose window.

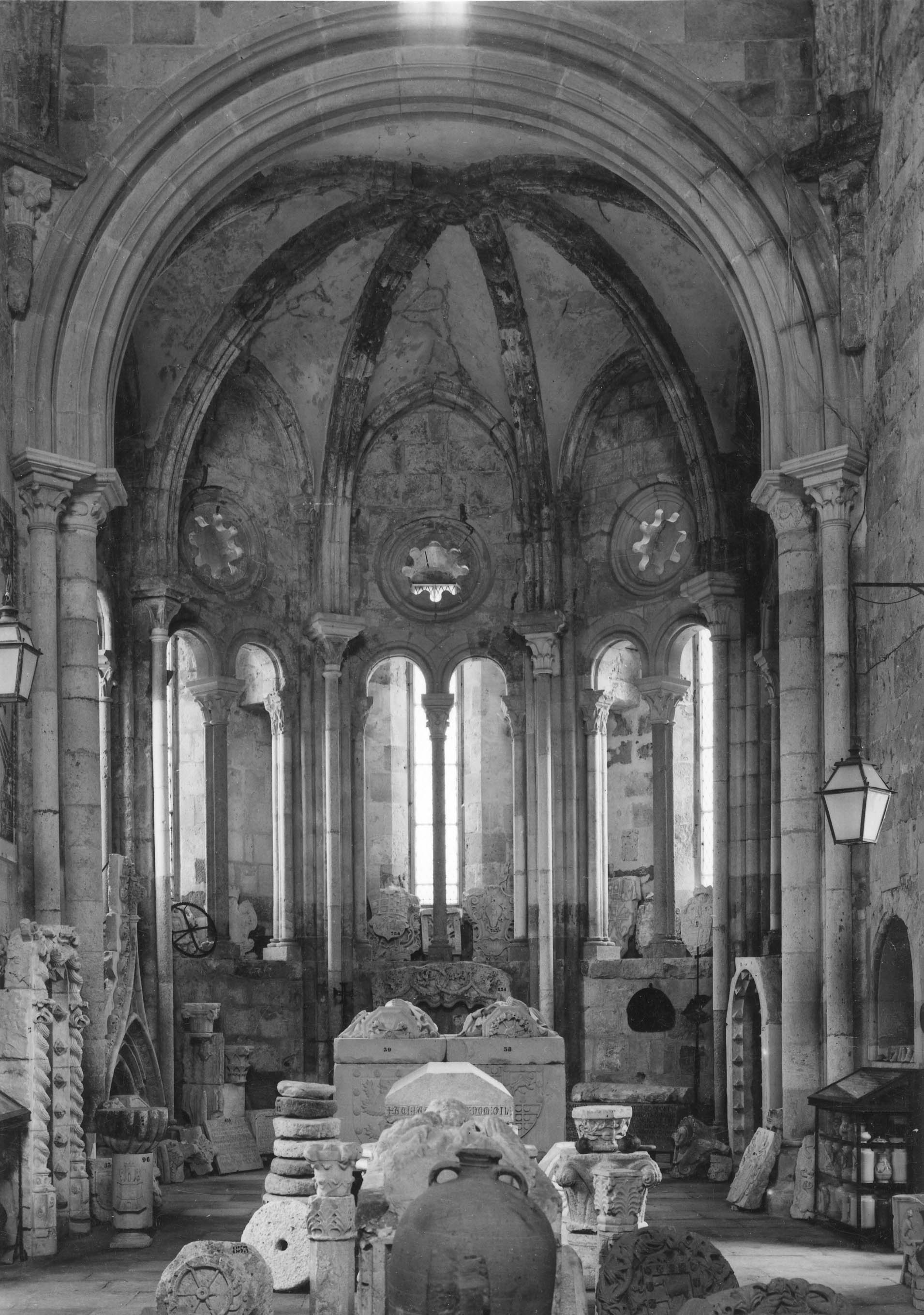
Main altar of São João do Alporão Church with a Romanesque ambulatory below a rib vault.

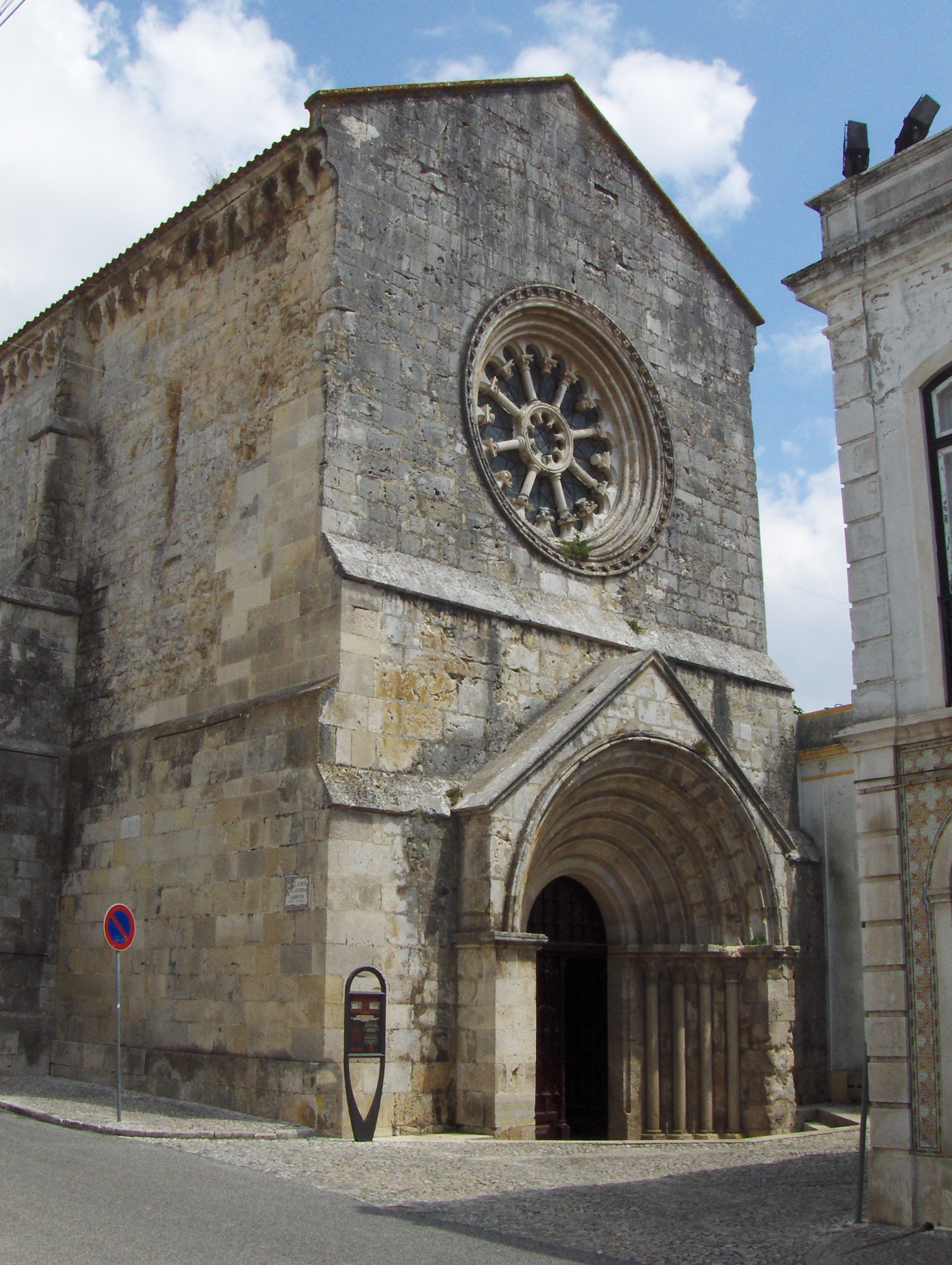
Church of São João do Alporão, built by the Knights Hospitaller after 1185, also presents early Gothic features like the rose window or the non-decorated portal.

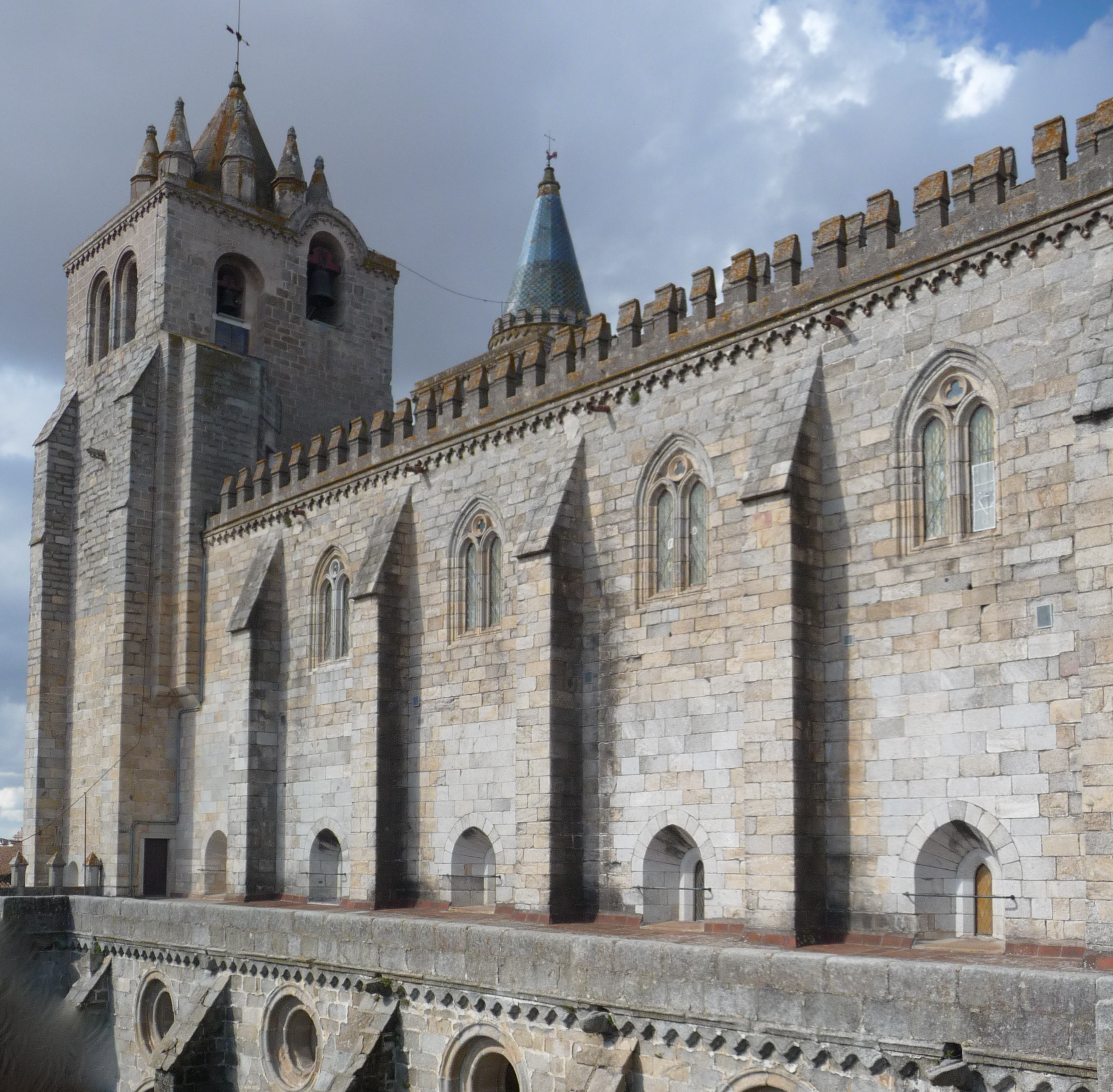
Lateral view of Évora Cathedral, where its massive buttresses give a very Romanesque look.
