= List of bridges in Portugal =

This list of bridges in Portugal lists bridges of particular historical, scenic, architectural or engineering interest. Road and railway bridges, viaducts, aqueducts and footbridges are included.

== Historical and architectural interest bridges ==
Image	Name	Distinction	Length	Type	Carries Crosses	Opened	Location	District	Ref.
	Roman Bridge of Vila Formosa	National monument	116 m (381 ft)	Masonry; 6 semi-circular arches	Road bridge Seda river	1st century	Alter do Chão; 39°12′57.8″N 7°47′5.7″W	Portalegre	
	Ponte de Lima Bridge	National monument		Masonry; 15 pointed arches, 7 semi-circular arches	Former road bridge Lima River	1st century	Ponte de Lima; 41°46′9.1″N 8°35′11.4″W	Viana do Castelo	
	Roman Bridge of Chaves	National monument	140 m (460 ft)	Masonry; 12 semi-circular arches	Former road bridge Tâmega (river)	2nd century	Chaves; 41°44′17.4″N 7°28′1″W	Vila Real	
	Segura Bridge		41 m (135 ft)	Masonry; 5 semi-circular arches	Road bridge Río Erjas	2nd century	Segura–Piedras Albas; 39°49′02.3″N 6°58′54.2″W	Castelo Branco; Spain	
	Sequeiros Bridge			Masonry; 3 semi-circular arches	Footbridge; Côa River	15th century	Vale Longo; 40°28′38″N 7°0′9.1″W	Guarda	
	Convent of Christ Aqueduct; Pegões crossing	National monument Supplies water to the Convent of Christ		Masonry; 2 levels,16 pointed arches on lower level, 58 semi-circular arches on upper level	Aqueduct; Pegões Valley	1614	Tomar; 39°36′30.9″N 8°26′25.8″W	Santarém	
	Amoreira Aqueduct; Elvas crossing			Masonry; 4 levels, 843 semi-circular arches	Aqueduct	1622	Elvas; 38°52′40.8″N 7°10′19.9″W	Portalegre District	
	Águas Livres Aqueduct; Alcántara crossing	National monument Height : 62 m (203 ft); Span : 33.7 m (111 ft)	941 m (3,087 ft)	Masonry; 14 pointed arches, 21 semi-circular arches	Aqueduct; Alcántara Valley	18th century	Lisbon; 38°43′47.7″N 9°10′14.1″W	Lisbon District	
	Poço de São Tiago Bridge	Height : 28.5 m (94 ft); Span : 53 m (174 ft)	165 m (541 ft)	Masonry; 1 main semi-circular arch, 12 secondary arches	Linha do Vouga; Vouga River	1913	Pessegueiro do Vouga; 40°41′57.7″N 8°22′31.7″W	Aveiro	

== Major road and railway bridges ==
This table presents the structures with spans greater than 100 meters (non-exhaustive list).

Image	Name	Span	Length	Type	Carries Crosses	Opened	Location	District	Ref.
	25 de Abril Bridge	1,013 m (3,323 ft)	3,173 m (10,410 ft)	Suspension; 2 levels steel truss deck, steel pylons 2x100+483+1013+483+99	A2 motorway European route E1; IP7; Linha do Sul; Tagus	1966	Lisbon–Almada; 38°41′23.5″N 9°10′37.8″W	Lisbon District; Setúbal	
	Third Tagus Crossing project	540 m (1,770 ft)	7,200 m (23,600 ft)	Cable-stayed; 2 levels steel truss deck, concrete pylons	4 lanes road bridge 4 railway lines Tagus		Lisbon–Barreiro; 38°41′0″N 9°5′0″W	Lisbon District; Setúbal	
	Dona Antónia Ferreira Bridge under construction	430 m (1,410 ft)	835 m (2,740 ft)	Arch	Porto Metro (Line H); Douro	2026	Porto–Vila Nova de Gaia; 41°8′47.2″N 8°38′6.7″W	Porto District	
	Vasco da Gama Bridge	420 m (1,380 ft)	12,345 m (40,502 ft)	Cable-stayed; Composite steel/concrete deck, concrete pylons 62+71+72+420+72+71+62	A12 motorway European route E90; IP1; Tagus	1998	Lisbon–Montijo; 38°47′9″N 9°5′17.1″W	Lisbon District; Setúbal	
	Guadiana International Bridge	324 m (1,063 ft)	666 m (2,185 ft)	Cable-stayed; Concrete box girder deck, concrete pylons 135+324+135	A22 motorway European route E1; IP1; Guadiana	1991	Castro Marim–Ayamonte; 37°14′15.3″N 7°25′12.9″W	Faro; Spain	
	Vila Real Bridge	300 m (980 ft)	2,796 m (9,173 ft)	Cable-stayed; Concrete box girder deck, concrete pylons 60+126+300+126+60	A4 motorway Corgo River	2013	Vila Real; 41°16′41.6″N 7°45′2.7″W	Vila Real	
	Infante Dom Henrique Bridge	280 m (920 ft)	371 m (1,217 ft)	Arch; Concrete deck arch	4 lanes road bridge Douro	2002	Porto–Vila Nova de Gaia; 41°8′28.4″N 8°36′5.7″W	Porto District	
	Arrábida Bridge	270 m (890 ft)	493 m (1,617 ft)	Arch; Concrete deck arch	A1 motorway A28 motorway Douro	1963	Porto–Vila Nova de Gaia; 41°8′50.9″N 8°38′25.1″W	Porto District	
	Portimão New Bridge	256 m (840 ft)	842 m (2,762 ft)	Cable-stayed; Concrete box girder deck, concrete pylons 107+256+107	National road 125; Arade River	1991	Portimão; 37°9′5.1″N 8°30′23.6″W	Faro	
	Ponte de São João	250 m (820 ft)	1,140 m (3,740 ft)	Box girder Prestressed concrete 5x60+125+250+125+2x60	Linha do Norte; Douro	1991	Porto–Vila Nova de Gaia; 41°8′20.3″N 8°35′43.3″W	Porto District	
	Ceira River Highway Bridge	250 m (820 ft)	930 m (3,050 ft)	Box girder Prestressed concrete	A13 motorway Ceira River	2014	Coimbra; 40°10′28.1″N 8°22′40.2″W	Coimbra	
	Salgueiro Maia Bridge	246 m (807 ft)	4,308 m (14,134 ft)	Cable-stayed; Concrete box girder deck, concrete pylons 42+78+246+78+42	A13 motorway IC10; Tagus	2000	Santarém; 39°12′4.5″N 8°40′50.2″W	Santarém	
	Edgar Cardoso Bridge	225 m (738 ft)	1,421 m (4,662 ft)	Cable-stayed; Composite steel/concrete deck, concrete pylons 90+225+90	National road 109; IC1; Mondego River	1982	Figueira da Foz; 40°8′42.2″N 8°50′30.6″W	Coimbra	
	Zêzere River Bridge	224 m (735 ft)	245 m (804 ft)	Arch; Concrete deck arch	2 lanes road bridge Zêzere River	1993	Ferreira do Zêzere–Vila de Rei; 39°41′49.6″N 8°13′47.1″W	Santarém; Castelo Branco	
	Tua River Bridge	220 m (720 ft)	500 m (1,600 ft)	Box girder Prestressed concrete 140+220+140	IC5; Tua River	2014	Carlão e Amieiro–Pinhal do Norte; 41°19′18.3″N 7°21′52.4″W	Vila Real; Bragança	
	Rainha Santa Isabel Bridge	186 m (610 ft)	329 m (1,079 ft)	Cable-stayed; Concrete box girder deck, concrete pylon	National road 17; Mondego River	2003	Coimbra; 40°11′33.8″N 8°25′26″W	Coimbra	
	Despe-te que Suas Viaduct	185 m (607 ft)	385 m (1,263 ft)	Box girder Prestressed concrete 105+185+95	EN1-1A; Despe-te Que Suas	2011	Nordeste (São Miguel Island); 37°50′40.7″N 25°13′26.6″W	Azores	
	Pedrógão Grande Bridge	180 m (590 ft)	480 m (1,570 ft)	Box girder Prestressed concrete 110+180+110	IC8; Zêzere River	1995	Pedrógão Grande; 39°54′16.6″N 8°8′21.5″W	Leiria	
	Miguel Torga Bridge	180 m (590 ft)	900 m (3,000 ft)	Box girder Prestressed concrete 80+100+140+180+108	A24 motorway European route E801; IP3; Douro	1997	Peso da Régua; 41°9′9.3″N 7°46′37.4″W	Vila Real; Viseu	
	Dom Luís I Bridge	172 m (564 ft)	385 m (1,263 ft)	Arch; Wrought iron deck and tied arch	Porto Metro (Line D); Road bridge Douro	1886	Porto–Vila Nova de Gaia; 41°8′23.8″N 8°36′33.9″W	Porto District	(Note: The Dom Luís I Bridge is registered in the UNESCO World Heritage Site list with the title "Historic Centre of Oporto, Luiz I Bridge and Monastery of Serra do Pilar".)
	Maria Pia Bridge	160 m (520 ft)	563 m (1,847 ft)	Arch; Wrought iron deck arch	Out of order Former Linha do Norte; Douro	1877	Porto–Vila Nova de Gaia; 41°8′23.4″N 8°35′49.2″W	Porto District	
	Sado River Railway Bridge	160 m (520 ft)(x3)	2,735 m (8,973 ft)	Arch; Steel tied arch Bow-string bridge	Linha do Sul; Alcácer Bypass; Sado River	2010	Alcácer do Sal; 38°24′28.1″N 8°36′2.1″W	Setúbal	
	Freixo Bridge	150 m (490 ft)	705 m (2,313 ft)	Box girder Prestressed concrete Twin bridges 115+150+115	A20 motorway European route E1; IP1; Douro	1995	Porto–Vila Nova de Gaia; 41°8′32.4″N 8°34′51.4″W	Porto District	
	Marão River Highway Bridge	148 m (486 ft)	910 m (2,990 ft)	Box girder Prestressed concrete	A4 motorway Marão River	2016	Amarante; 41°15′01.9″N 7°59′10.5″W	Porto District	
	Corgo Viaduct (A24)	145 m (476 ft)(x3)	625 m (2,051 ft)	Box girder Prestressed concrete Twin bridges 95+3x145+95	A24 motorway European route E801; IP3; Corgo River	2004	Peso da Régua; 41°10′25.4″N 7°45′58.9″W	Vila Real	
	Sordo River Highway Bridge	140 m (460 ft)	412 m (1,352 ft)	Box girder Prestressed concrete Twin bridges 90+140+90	A4 motorway Sordo River	2016	Vila Real; 41°16′08.8″N 7°47′04.5″W	Vila Real	
	Ribeira Funda Bridge	135 m (443 ft)	280 m (920 ft)	Box girder Prestressed concrete	R101; Ribeira Funda	2004	Estreito da Calheta; 32°44′40.4″N 17°11′53.5″W	Madeira	
	Sado River Highway Bridge	135 m (443 ft)	1,754 m (5,755 ft)	Box girder Prestressed concrete Twin bridges	A2 motorway European route E1; IP1; Sado River	1999	Alcácer do Sal; 38°21′58.6″N 8°29′22.4″W	Setúbal	
	Lezíria Bridge	133 m (436 ft)	11,902 m (39,049 ft)	Box girder Prestressed concrete 95+127+133+4x130+95	A10 motorway IC11; Tagus; Sorraia River	2007	Carregado–Benavente; 39°0′45.8″N 8°56′3.8″W	Lisbon District; Santarém	
	Vila Pouca de Aguiar Viaduct	130 m (430 ft)(x5)	1,349 m (4,426 ft)	Box girder Prestressed concrete Twin bridges 79+5x130+79	A24 motorway European route E801; IP3	2007	Vila Pouca de Aguiar; 41°28′55.3″N 7°39′13.6″W	Vila Real	
	João Gomes Bridge	125 m (410 ft)	274 m (899 ft)	Box girder Prestressed concrete	R101	1994	Funchal; 32°39′44.7″N 16°53′53.3″W	Madeira	
	Águeda International Bridge	115 m (377 ft)		Truss; Composite steel/concrete deck	Águeda (river)	2000	Barca de Alva–La Fregeneda; 41°1′31.9″N 6°55′47.4″W	Guarda; Spain	
	Mosteirô Bridge	110 m (360 ft)		Box girder Prestressed concrete	National road 211; Douro	1972	Ancede–Cinfães; 41°05′32.2″N 8°04′40.1″W	Porto District; Viseu	
	Socorridos Bridge	106 m (348 ft)	331 m (1,086 ft)	Extradosed; Concrete box girder deck, concrete pylons and cable-stays	R101	1993	Câmara de Lobos; 32°39′17.1″N 16°57′52.9″W	Madeira	
	Varosa Bridge	100 m (330 ft)	460 m (1,510 ft)	Box girder Prestressed concrete Twin bridges	A24 motorway European route E801; IP3; Varosa	1998	Lamego; 41°07′52.1″N 7°46′25.9″W	Viseu	
	Balsemão Bridge	100 m (330 ft)		Box girder Prestressed concrete Twin bridges	A24 motorway European route E801; IP3; Varosa	1998	Lamego; 41°06′45.7″N 7°46′38.7″W	Viseu	

== List of bridges by region ==
=== Alentejo ===
Name	Locality	Date	Image	Notes
Lower Guadiana International bridge	Pomarão	2009		Connects Portugal and Spain across Chança river.
Ponte de Alcácer	Nossa Senhora da Vila, Nossa Senhora do Bispo e Silveiras, Montemor-o-Novo			
Ponte do Chocanal	Crato e Mártires, Flor da Rosa e Vale do Peso, Crato			
Ponte D. Maria	Santa Clara-a-Velha, Odemira	1758		
Ponte dos Mendes	Chancelaria, Alter do Chão			
Ponte de Mértola	Mértola (freguesia), Mértola	12th C.		
Ponte da Ribeira de Cobres	Almodôvar e Graça dos Padrões, Almodôvar	13th C.		
Ponte Romana do Rio Brenhas	Moura (Santo Agostinho e São João Baptista) e Santo Amador, Moura	Roman		
Ponte Romana de Vale do Peso	Crato e Mártires, Flor da Rosa e Vale do Peso, Crato			
Ponte Romana de Vila Ruiva	Vila Ruiva, Cuba, Beja District	1st century BCE		
Ponte da Ajuda	Olivença, Portugal	1510		
Roman Bridge of Vila Formosa	Alter do Chão	1st century CE		

=== Algarve ===
Name	Locality	Date	Image	Notes
Ponte de Aljezur	Aljezur, Aljezur	18th C.		crosses the Aljezur River
Ponte de Almargem	Conceição e Cabanas de Tavira, Tavira			
Ponte Dona Maria	São Sebastião e Santa Maria, Lagos			
Guadiana International Bridge	Castro Marim, Castro Marim	1991		crosses the Guadiana River
Ponte Medieval de Algoz	Algoz e Tunes, Silves			
Basculante footbridge	Lagos			Footbridge across the Bensafrim River
Ponte Barão	Boliqueime			EM526 road crosses the Quarteira River
Praia dos Estudantes footbridge	Praia dos Estudantes Lagos			Footbridge linking the mainland to an offshore rock
Mercês River bridge	Querença			crosses the Mercês River
Paderne A22 motorway bridge	Paderne, Albufeira			crosses the Quarteira River
Ponte de Paderne	Paderne, Albufeira			crosses the Quarteira River
Portimão Railway Bridge	Portimão	1915		Linha do Algarve crosses the Arade River
Ponte Nova Portimão	Portimão			EN125 road bridge linking crossing the Arade River
Ponte da Ribeira de Aljezur	Aljezur, Aljezur			
Ponte de Rio Gilão	Santa Maria e Santiago, Tavira			
Ponte da Ribeira do Foupana	Alcoutim e Pereiro, Alcoutim			
Ponte Romana do Barão	São Clemente, Loulé			
Ponte Romana de Tôr	Tôr e Benafim, Querença			
Ponte de Silves	Silves, Silves			
Ponte Velha de Quelfes	Quelfes, Olhão			

=== Central ===
Name	Locality	Date	Image	Notes
Ponte da Anaia	São João Baptista e São Pedro, Porto do Mós			
Ponte da Arrochela	Matas e Cercal, Ourém			
Ponte de Barra	São Jacinto (parish), Aveiro			
Ponte da Barreira	Manhouce, São Pedro do Sul			
Ponte do Cabeço do Vouga	Trofa, Segadães e Lamas do Vouga, Águeda			
Ponte de Chiqueda	Aljubarrota, Alcobaça			
Bridge over the river Côa	Almeida Municipality			
Ponte do Cubo	Atouguia, Ourém			
Ponte da Fonte	Ançã, Cantanhede			
Ponte de Manhouce	Manhouce, São Pedro do Sul			
Ponte Medieval das Matas	Nossa Senhora das Misericórdias, Ourém			
Ponte da Palhaça	Palhaça, Oliveira do Bairro			
Ponte do Paul	Paul, Covilhã	13th C.		
Ponte Pedonal Circular de Aveiro	Aveiro	2006		crosses two canals
Ponte de Portas de Ródão	Vila Velha de Ródão, Vila Velha de Ródão			
Ponte da Ribeira de Meimoa	Meimoa, Penamacor	14th-16th C.		
Ponte Romana de Bobadela	Bobadela, Oliveira do Hospital			
Ponte Romana de Modim da Beira	Mondim da Beira, Tarouca			
Ponte Romana de Sandomil	Sandomil, Seia			
Ponte de Sabugal	Sabugal e Aldeia de Santo António, Sabugal			
Ponte de Segura	Segura, Idanha-a-Nova			
Ponte da Varela	Bunheiro/Torreira, Murtosa	1964		Spans Aviero lagoon

=== Lisbon ===
Name	Locality	Date	Image	Notes
Ponte 25 de Abril	Alcântara (Lisbon), Lisbon	1966		crosses the River Tagus
Ponte de Cheleiros	Cheleiros, Mafra			
Ponte Filipina de São Pedro do Estoril	Cascais e Estoril, Cascais			
Lezíria Bridge	Carregado, Alenquer	2007		spans the Tagus River and the Sorraia River
Ponte Marechal Carmona	Vila Franca de Xira (freguesia), Vila Franca de Xira			
Ponte Pedonal da Segunda Circular	Carnide (freguesia), Lisbon			
Roman Bridge of Catribana	São João das Lampas, Sintra	Roman		crosses the Samarra river.
Ponte de Sacavém	Sacavém, Loures			
Vasco da Gama Bridge	Sacavém, Loures	1998		crosses the River Tagus

=== North ===
Name	Locality	Date	Image	Notes
Almirante Sarmento Rodrigues Bridge	Barca d’Alva, Figueira de Castelo Rodrigo	c.1955		crosses the River Douro
Ponte Antiga de Aregos	Miomães, Resende			
Ponte Antiga de Santo Adrião	Armamar (freguesia), Armamar			crosses the Rio Tedo
Ponte do Arco	Vreia de Jales, Vila Pouca de Aguiar			
Ponte do Arco de Baúlhe	Arco de Baúlhe e Vila Nune, Cabeceiras de Basto	18th C.		crosses the Tâmega River
Ponte do Aquinho	Fradizela, Mirandela			
Ponte do Arquinho	Arcozelo, Ponte de Lima			
Ponte da Arrábida	Lordelo do Ouro e Massarelos, Porto	1963		Crosses the River Douro
Ponte de Assureira	Castro Laboreiro e Lamas de Mouro, Melgaço			
Ponte de Ázere	Couto, Arcos de Valdevez			
Ponte da Balsa	Campo e Sobrado, Valongo			
Ponte da Barbeita	Barbeita, Monção	c. 14th C.		
Ponte de Barcelos	Vila Boa e Vila Frescainha (São Martinho e São Pedro), Barcelos	c.1328		
Ponte do Bico	Palmeira, Braga	1866		
Ponte das Caínheiras	Castro Laboreiro e Lamas de Mouro, Melgaço	c. 18th C.		
Ponte de Carcavelos	Cárquere, Resende			
Ponte do Castelo do Mau Vizinho	Roge, Vale de Cambra			
Ponte de Cavez do Rio Tâmega	Cavez, Cabeceiras de Basto	13th C.		
Ponte de Cidadelha	Vila Pouca de Aguiar (freguesia), Vila Pouca de Aguiar			
Ponte de Coronados	São Pedro de Castelões, Vale de Cambra	c. 17th-18th C.		
Ponte Dom Luís I	Cedofeita, Santo Ildefonso, Sé, Miragaia, São Nicolau e Vitória, Porto			crosses the River Douro
Ponte D. Maria Pia	Bonfim, Porto	1877		closed railway bridge over River Douro
Ponte de Dorna	Castro Laboreiro e Lamas de Mouro, Melgaço			
Ponte Eiffel	Santa Maria Maior, Viana do Castelo	1878		road-rail bridge over the River Lima
Ponte de Ermelo do Rio Olo	Ermelo, Mondim de Basto			
Ponte Ferreira	Campo e Sobrado, Valongo			
Ponte Ferroviária do Pocinho	Açoreira, Torre de Moncorvo	1909		railway bridge over the River Douro
Ponte Ferroviária do Ribeiro de Murça	Vila Nova de Foz Côa, Vila Nova de Foz Côa			Carries railway across the River Douro
Ponte de Fonte Arcada	Fonte Arcada e Escurquela, Sernancelhe			
Ponte da Fontinha	Roge, Vale de Cambra	c 17th-18th C.		spans Rio Caima
Ponte do Freixo	Campanhã, Porto	1995		
Ponte de Frieira	Macedo do Mato, Bragança			
Ponte do Fumo	Távora e Pereiro, Tabuaço			
Ponte de Gimonde	Gimonde, Bragança	Roman		
Ponte dos Jogos	Mirandela, Mirandela			
Ponte da Lagariça	São Cipriano (Resende), Resende			
Ponte de Lagoncinha	Lousado, Vila Nova de Famalicão			
Ponte Medieval de Panchorra	Panchorra, Resende			
Ponte do Meirinho	Ervededo, Chaves			
Ponte de Mem Gutierres	Esperança, Póvoa de Lanhoso	c. 14th-15th C.		
Ponte metálica de Fão	Esposende, Marinhas e Gandra, Esposende	1892		
Ponte Metálica de Pêso da Régua	Peso da Régua e Godim, Pêso da Régua			
Ponte dos Mineiros	Argozelo, Vimioso			
Ponte da Missa	Ervededo, Chaves			
Ponte da Mizarela	Ruivães, Vieira do Minho	19th C.		
Ponte Nova da Cava da Velha	Castro Laboreiro e Lamas de Mouro, Melgaço	1st C.		
Ponte da Ola	Bragado, Vila Pouca de Aguiar			
Ponte de Ovadas	Ovadas e Panchorra, Resende			
Ponte de Pêso da Régua	Peso da Régua e Godim, Pêso da Régua	1934		carries railway across the River Douro
Ponte da Pica	Vila de Cucujães, Oliveira de Azeméis			
Ponte do Pinhão	Pinhão, Alijó			
Ponte de Piscais	Mouçós, Vila Real	Roman		crosses the River Corgo
Ponte de Porto Cavalos	Cepelos (Vale de Cambra), Vale de Cambra			
Ponte do Prado	Merelim (São Paio), Panoias e Parada de Tibães, Braga	1617		crosses the Cávado River
Ponte de Prozelo	Ferreiros, Prozelo e Besteiros, Amares	14th C.		
Ponte do Rio Ave	Caldelas, Guimarães			
Ponte do Rio Beça	Beça, Boticas			
Ponte do Rio Couto	Covas do Barroso, Boticas			
Ponte do Rio Moimenta	Cavez, Cabeceiras de Basto			
Ponte do Rio Vade	Oleira, Ponte da Barca			
Ponte do Rodeiro	Castro Laboreiro e Lamas de Mouro, Melgaço			
Ponte de Rodas	Caldelas, Amares, Ponte (Vila Verde)	Roman		spans the Rio Homem
Roman Bridge (Chaves) aka Trajan's Bridge	Santa Maria Maior, Chaves	Roman		
Ponte Romana de Modim de Basto	São Cristóvão de Mondim de Basto, Mondim de Basto			
Ponte Romana de Poirezes	Chã, Montalegre	Roman		
Ponte Romana de São Pedro Velho	São Pedro Velho, Mirandela			
Ponte de Rubiães	Cossourado e Linhares, Paredes de Coura			crosses the River Coura
Ponte de Santiago	Ervededo, Chaves			
Ponte de São João	Bonfim, Porto	1991		railway bridge across the River Douro
Ponte de Serves	Gondar, Guimarães			
Ponte das Taipas	Caldas das Taipas, Guimarães			
Ponte das Travessas	São Jõao da Madeira, São Jõao da Madeira			
Ponte de Troporiz	Troporiz e Lapela, Monção			
Ponte de Valpaços	Valpaços, Valpaços			
Ponte de Varziela	Castro Laboreiro e Lamas de Mouro, Melgaço			
Ponte das Veigas	Castro Laboreiro e Lamas de Mouro, Melgaço			
Ponte Velha de Castro Laboreiro	Castro Laboreiro e Lamas de Mouro, Melgaço			
Ponte Velha de Padastros	Macieira de Cambra, Vale de Cambra			
Ponte Velha de Pinelo	Argozelo, Vimioso			
Ponte Velha de São Pedro da Torre	São Pedro da Torre, Valença	c. 13th-14th C.		
Ponte Velha de Vila do Ponte	Vila da Ponte, Montalegre			
Ponte Velha de Vizela	Caldas de Vizela (São Miguel e São João), Vizela			
Ponte de Vilar de Mouros	Vilar de Mouros, Caminha	c. 14th-15th C.		
Ponte de Vilar de Viando	Mondim de Basto, Modim de Basto			
Ponte de Vilela	Aveleda, Lousada	13th C.		
Vila Real Bridge	Folhadela, Vila Real	2013		Carries A4 over the River Corgo

=== Madeira ===
Name	Locality	Date	Image	Notes
João Gomes Bridge	Funchal, Madeira	1994		Carries road traffic across the Ribeira de João Gomes – VR1, Madeira

== Notes and references ==
- Notes
- "Monumentos.gov.pt" (in Portuguese). - Sistema de Informação para o Património Arquitectónico, Ministério da Cultura
- Nicolas Janberg. "International Database for Civil and Structural Engineering". Structurae.com.
- Others references

== See also ==
- pt:Lista de pontes históricas do Alentejo (in Portuguese) - List of historic bridges in Alentejo
- Transport in Portugal
- Roads in Portugal
- List of highways in Portugal
- Rail transport in Portugal
- Geography of Portugal
