= Varela (disambiguation) =

Varela is a Spanish and Portuguese surname of Galician origin. It may also refer to:

- 19023 Varela, an asteroid
- Florencio Varela, a city in Buenos Aires Province, Argentina
- José Pedro Varela, a city in Lavalleja, Uruguay
- Los Varela, a village and municipality in Argentina
- Palmar de Varela, a municipality and town in Caribbean, Colombia
- Ponte da Varela, a bridge in Aveiro District, Portugal
- Varela, a town in Guinea-Bissau that sits on the Guinea-Bissau–Senegal border
- Varela (Buenos Aires Underground), a mass transit station
- Varela Project, movement for political change in Cuba
- Vitalina Varela, a 2019 Portuguese drama film
