= Cavez Bridge =

Cavez Bridge Ponte de Cavez
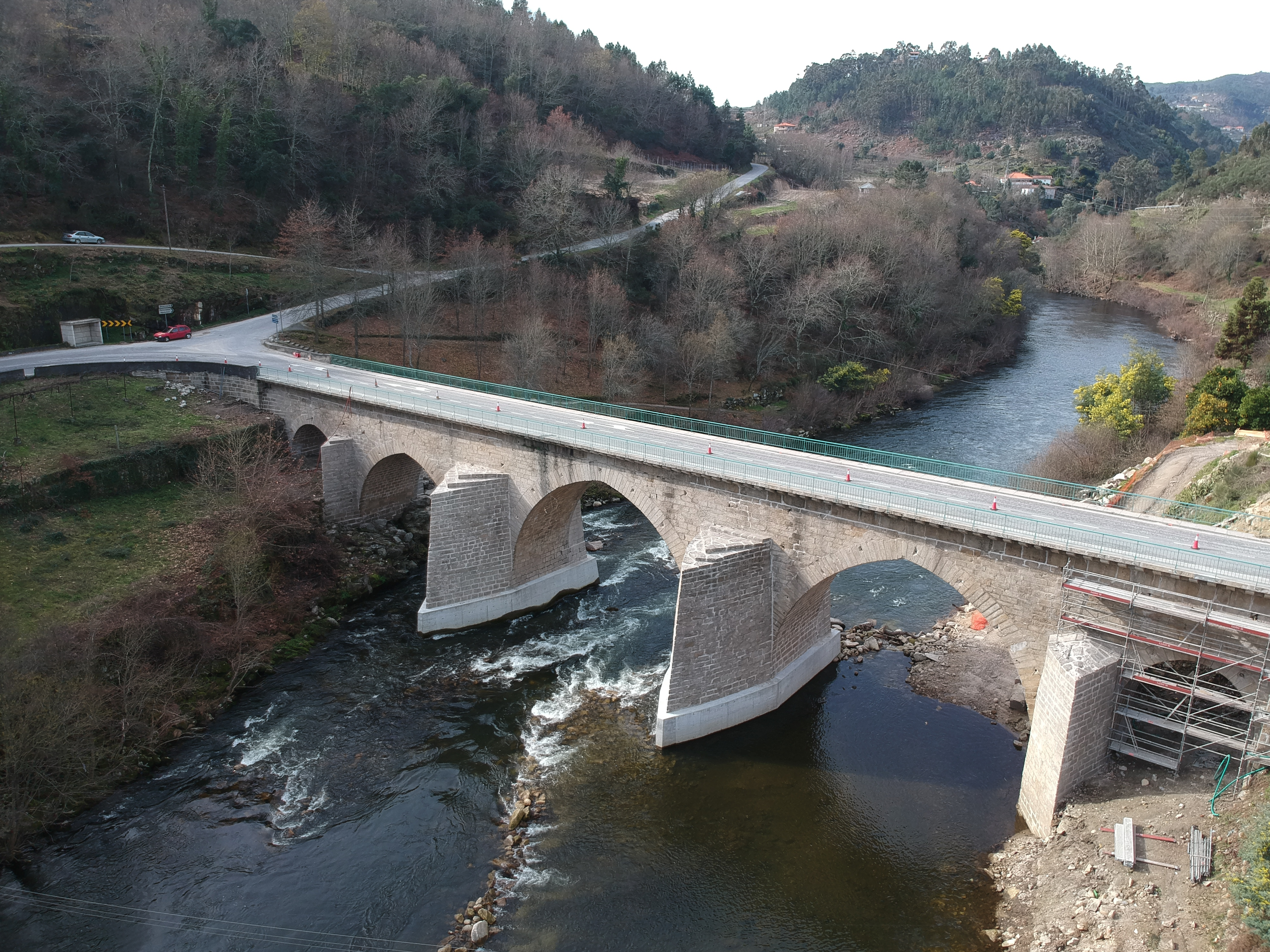
- Aerial photograph of the bridge
- Coordinates: 41°30′50″N 7°53′28″W
- Locale: Braga District, Portugal

Cavez Bridge is a medieval bridge that crosses the Tâmega River, located in Cavez, Braga District, in Portugal. The bridge was classified as a National Monument in 1910. It features five uneven arches, with cutwaters in the pillars.

== See also ==
- List of bridges in Portugal

== Sources ==
- Meretti, F. S.; Reis, C.; Baptista, J. J. F.; Oliveira, C. (2020). "Safety at Rehabilitation Works of the Cavez Bridge Over Tâmega River". In Arezes P.; et al. (eds.). Occupational and Environmental Safety and Health II. Studies in Systems, Decision and Control. Vol. 277. Springer. doi:10.1007/978-3-030-41486-3_12.
- de Sousa Pedrosa, A.; da Silva Costa, F. (1999). "As cheias do rio Tâmega. O caso da área urbana de Amarante". Territorium (in Portuguese). 6: 49–60.
