= Ponte da Fontinha =

Bridge of Fontinha Ponte da Fontinha
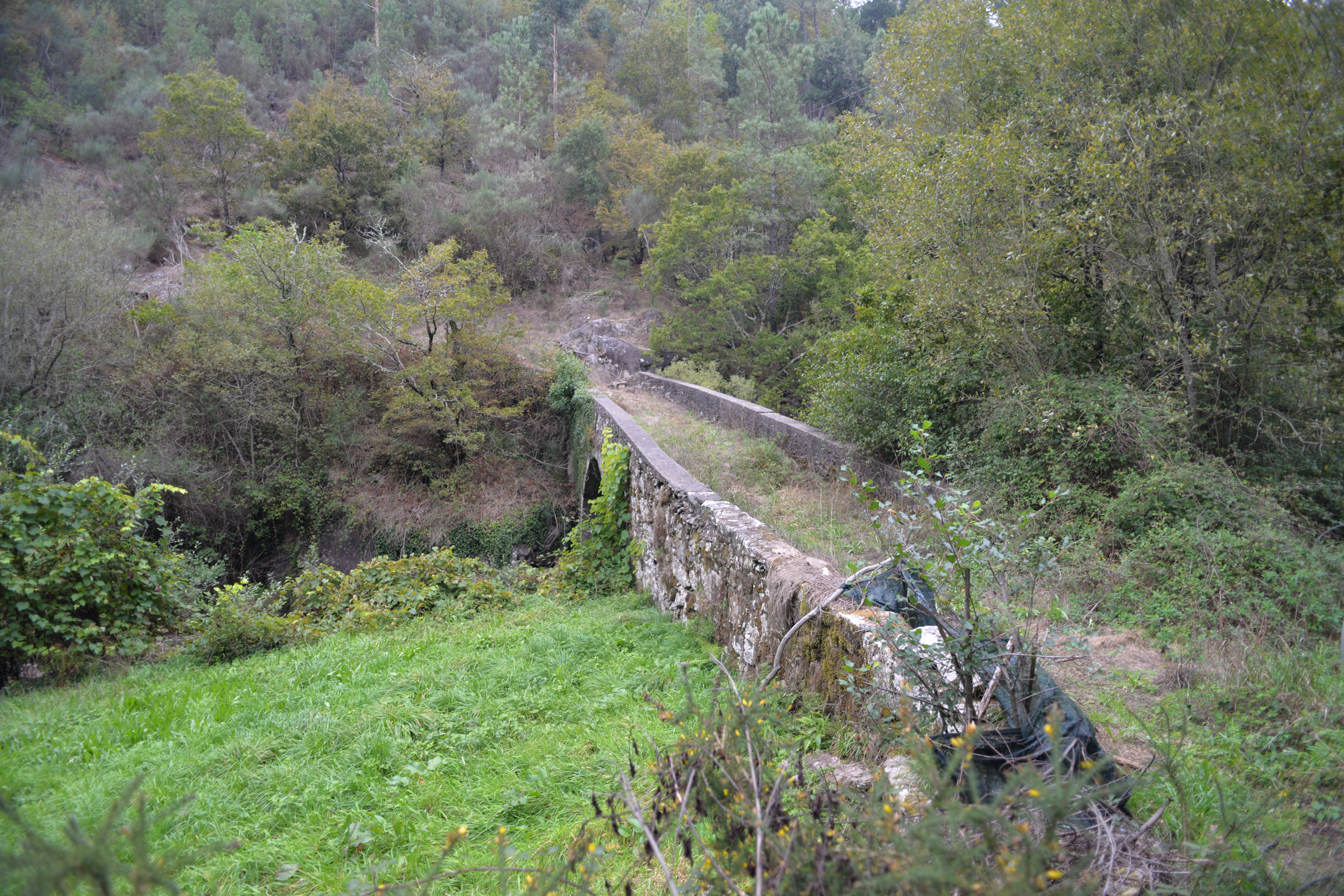
- Coordinates: 40°51′13″N 8°18′52″W
- Locale: Portugal, Vale de Cambra, Roge
- Official name: Ponte de Paço de Mato/Ponte da Fontinha
- Other name(s): Ponte de Paço de Mato

Characteristics
- Design: Medieval
- Material: Reinforced concrete

History
- Designer: unknown

The Bridge of Fontinha (Portuguese: Ponte da Fontinha) is a medieval bridge situated in the civil parish of Roge, in the municipality of Vale de Cambra, Portuguese district of Aveiro.

== History ==
The bridge was constructed sometime between the 17th and 18th century.

In 1992, there was a proposal from the Plano Diretor Municipal of Vale de Cambra to classify the structure of local heritage. By 14 September 2006, a dispatch from the IPPAR (forerunner of IGESPAR) closed the process to classify the structure.

== Architecture ==
Situated in a rural location and isolated, serving an old road between Paço de Mato and Viadal that crosses the Rio Caima. It is located along the steep, cliffs, covered by vegetation and a riverbank dug by kettles. Near the southern margin, but father upstream are the ruins of an old mill constructed in masonry, with ceiling in slate. The road access that descends from Paço de Mato to the bank still retains many segments constructed of cobbled pavement.

Fontinha is a bridge over a simple arch, supported by footings sunk into the banks of the river, with larger staves then length constructed from granite and joined by mortar.

== See also ==
- List of bridges in Portugal
