= Ponte Antiga de Santo Adrião =

Old Bridge of Santo Adrião Ponte Antiga de Santo Adrião
- Coordinates: 41.128567°N 7.633222°W
- Carries: vehicles, pedestrian
- Crosses: Rio Tedo
- Locale: Portugal, Armamar, Vila Seca e Santo Adrião
- Official name: Ponte Antiga de Santo Adrião
- Other name(s): Ponte antiga de Santo Adrião sobre o rio Tejo
- Heritage status: Property of Public Interest

Characteristics
- Material: Granite
- Total length: 50 metres (160 ft)
- Width: 4 metres (13 ft)

History
- Constructed by: David Álvares, António Fernandes de Oliveira (masons)

The Old Bridge of Santo Adrião (Portuguese: Ponte Antiga de Santo Adrião) is a two-arch bridge over the Rio Tedo in the civil parish of Vila Seca e Santo Adrião, municipality of Armamar, the Portuguese district of Viseu.

== History ==
Historians believe that the primitive bridge was most likely constructed between the 2nd century B.C. and 1st century A.D. It was built as an integration into the Roman road network that supported two secondary or municipal tracks (Viae vicinales) between Moimenta da Beira, Tabuaço and the Douro River, that converge on this location.

The bridge was constructed during the Middle Ages.

On 23 December 1639, the power of attorney passed to António Fernandes de Oliveira, who was responsible for collecting monies from feints for its reconstruction, and had been previously sold by David Alvarez.

In the 1758 Memórias Paroquiais, signed by Father Pedro Souto of Santa Leocádia, the two-arch bridge was referred to as having no guardrail, since it was incomplete. This was remedied by the 19th century, when guardrails were installed on the bridge.

By the middle of the 20th century, the surface was covered in bitumen to provide safe conditions for automobile, but part of the resurfaced bridge was destroyed by an automobile accident, that damaged the paraments. By 1980, the Direcção-Geral dos Edifícios e Monumentos Nacionais (Directorate-General for Buildings and National Monuments) removed the asphalt and resurfaced the platform with Portuguese pavement.

== Architecture ==
The bridge is situated in an isolated, rural location in a deep valley with thick vegetation that includes chestnut, oak and olive trees, alongside vineyards and agricultural lands. The bridge follows the EM roadway between Santo Adrião and Tabuaço, crossing the Rio Tedo. An affluent of the Douro, the Tedo limits the municipalities of Tabuaço and Armamar, at the former-parish of Santo Adrião: it is accessible from the municipal CM1101 roadway from the national EN313.

The identical double arch bridge, is supported by talhamares on either margin, its arches decorated with archivolts. The origin of the Tedo name originated with the Christian warrior that during the Reconquista dominated the lands of the region. The lateral guardrails are constructed of two-high vertical stone blocks and mortar, with the pavement formed from granite slabs.

== See also ==
- List of bridges in Portugal
