= Ponte da Palhaça =

Palhaça Bridges Pontes da Palhaça
- Crosses: Ribeira da Tojeira
- Locale: Portugal, Oliveira do Bairro, Palhaça
- Official name: Pontes da Palhaça

Characteristics
- Material: Tile with Lime Mortar
- Total length: 5.2 metres (17 ft)

The Ponte da Palhaça is a bridge crossing the Ribeira da Tojeira in the civil parish of Palhaça, municipality of Oliveira do Bairro in the Portuguese district of Aveiro.

== History ==
The bridge is situated along a deactivated roadway, but actually served as an important arterial until the 19th century. Yet, information from the period indicate that cattle could cross the bridge.

Sometime in the 20th century the bridge was reconstructed, but since became buried up to the arches.

On 2 April 1992, the DRCoimbra proposed the classification of the bridge as a cultural heritage site. On May 13 a dispatch by Vice-President of the IPPC was issued in order to validate this proposition, but the proposal expired by 23 October 2009.

== Architecture ==
The structure was situated east of the village of Palhaça, crossing the affluents of the Ribeira da Tojeira. It is a 5.2-metre-long (17 ft) bridge constructed of clay (a popular material in a region to substitute stone).

The bridge was structurally a one-arched structure, with flat surface, constructed of tile with lime mortar.

== See also ==
- List of bridges in Portugal
