= Bridge of Serves =

Bridge of Serves Ponte de Serves
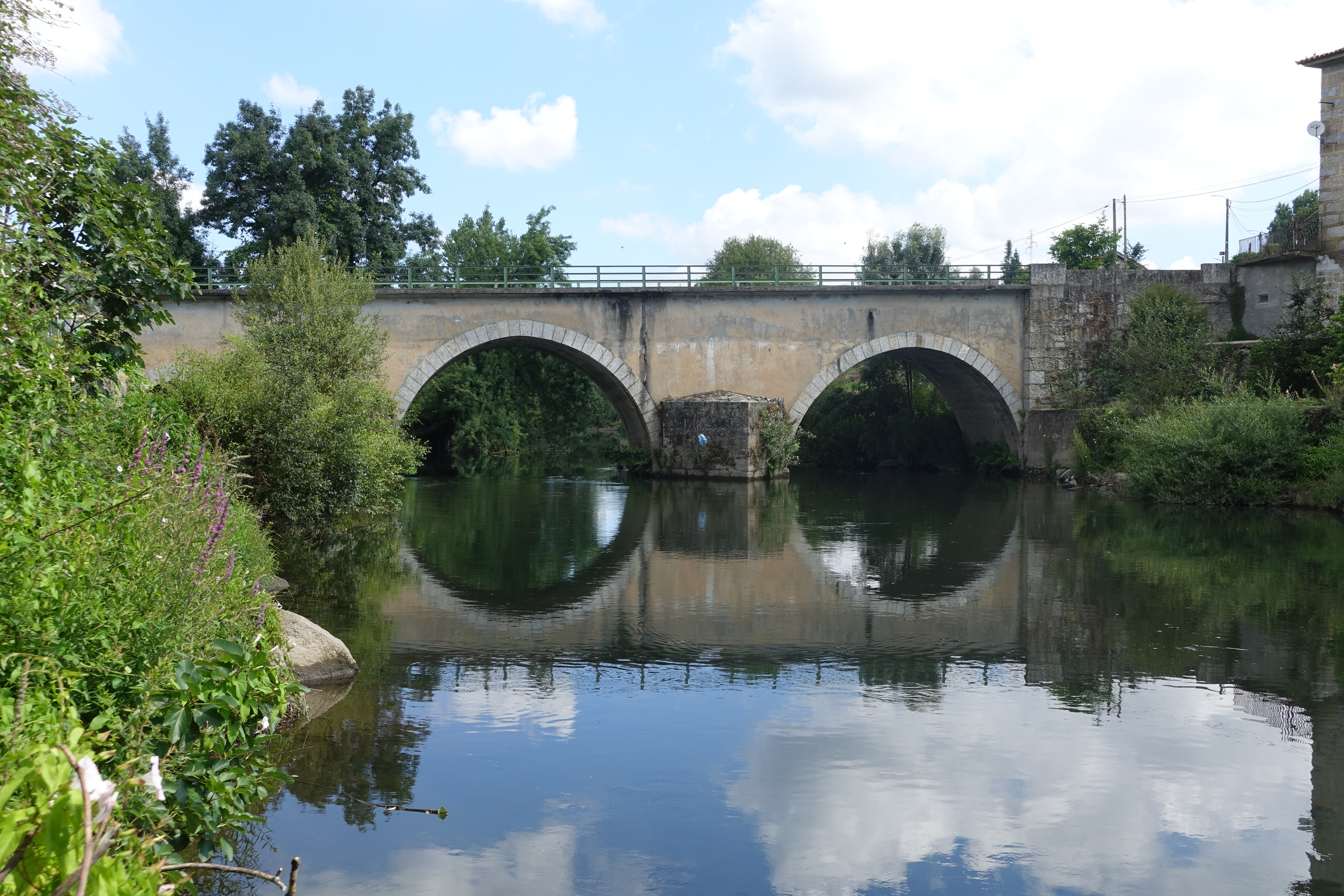
- Coordinates: 41°25′13″N 8°22′38″W
- Crosses: Ave river
- Locale: Vila Nova de Famalicão; Guimarães, Portugal

Characteristics
- Total length: 54,8 m
- Width: 6 m

History
- Construction start: 1185

Bridge of Serves is a bridge to connect Pedome, Vila Nova de Famalicão, Portugal to Gondar, Guimarães, Portugal, crossing the Ave River. The bridge was classified as a National Monument in 1938. Construction probably started in 1185; the structure underwent reinforcement works in 1950 that left it completely changed from its medieval origins. It features four uneven arches, with cutwaters in the pillars.

== See also ==
- List of bridges in Portugal
