= Ponte do Arco de Baúlhe =

Ponte do Arco de Baúlhe - Cabeceiras de Basto, Portugal in Arch Bridges
- Coordinates: 41.5160°N 7.9827°W
- Crosses: Ouro river (called by some the Peio river)
- Locale: Cabeceiras de Basto Braga District, Portugal
- Other name: Ponte Velha

Characteristics
- Total length: 70m
- Height: 20m

Statistics
- Daily traffic: Pedestrians, Motor vehicles

Location
- Interactive map of Ponte do Arco de Baúlhe - Cabeceiras de Basto, Portugal in Arch Bridges

Ponte do Arco de Baúlhe, is a bridge in Portugal that crosses the Ouro River. The bridge connects the towns of Arco de Baúlhe and Pedraça. It was built in the 18th century.

== See also ==
- List of bridges in Portugal
