= Ponte do Arquinho =

Bridge in Valpaços, Portugal

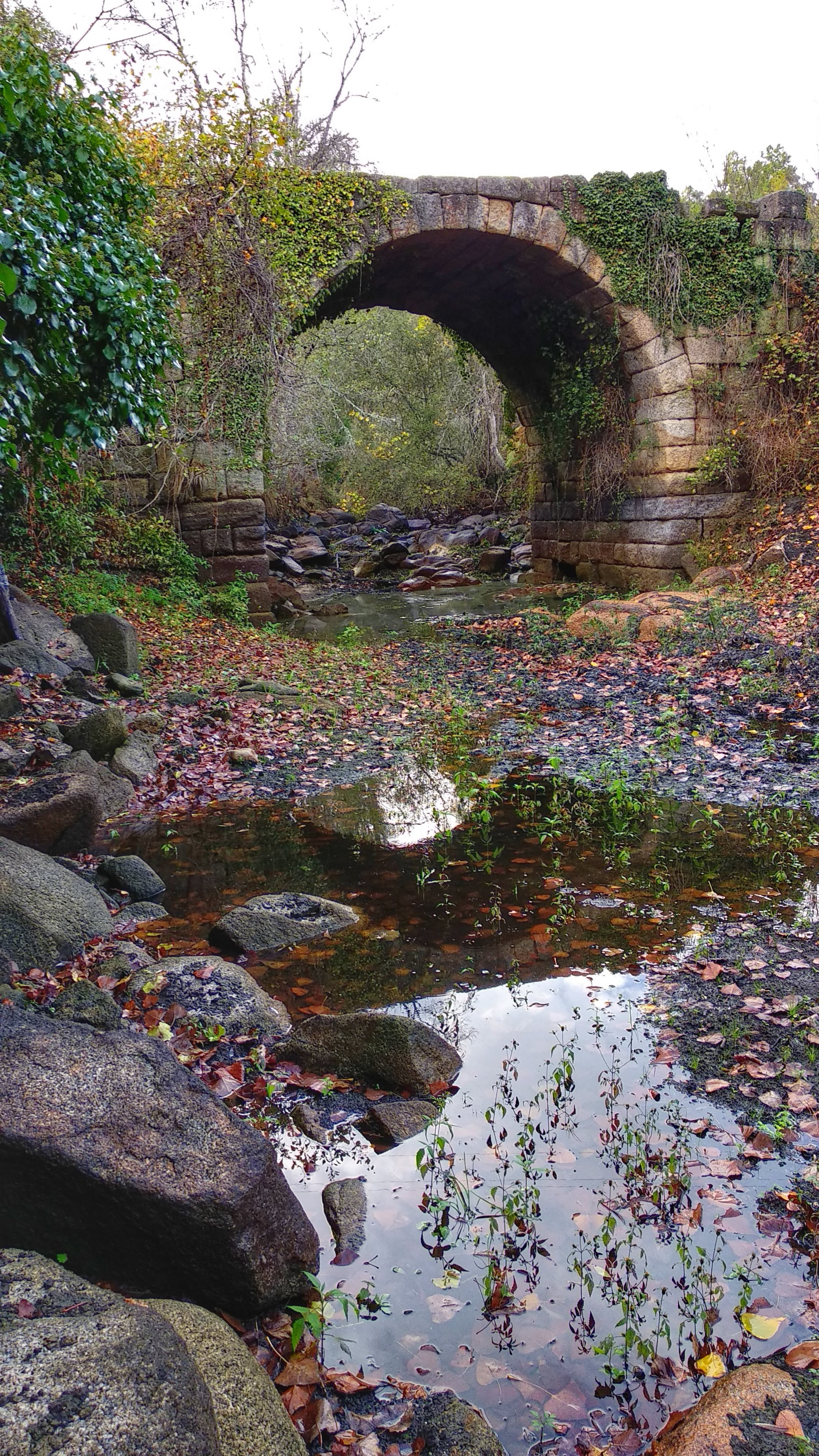

Ponte do Arquinho is a Roman bridge from the 1st century located in Valpaços, Portugal.

== See also ==
- List of bridges in Portugal
