= Ponte da Ribeira de Meimoa =

Ribeira de Meimoa Bridge Ponte da Ribeira de Meimoa
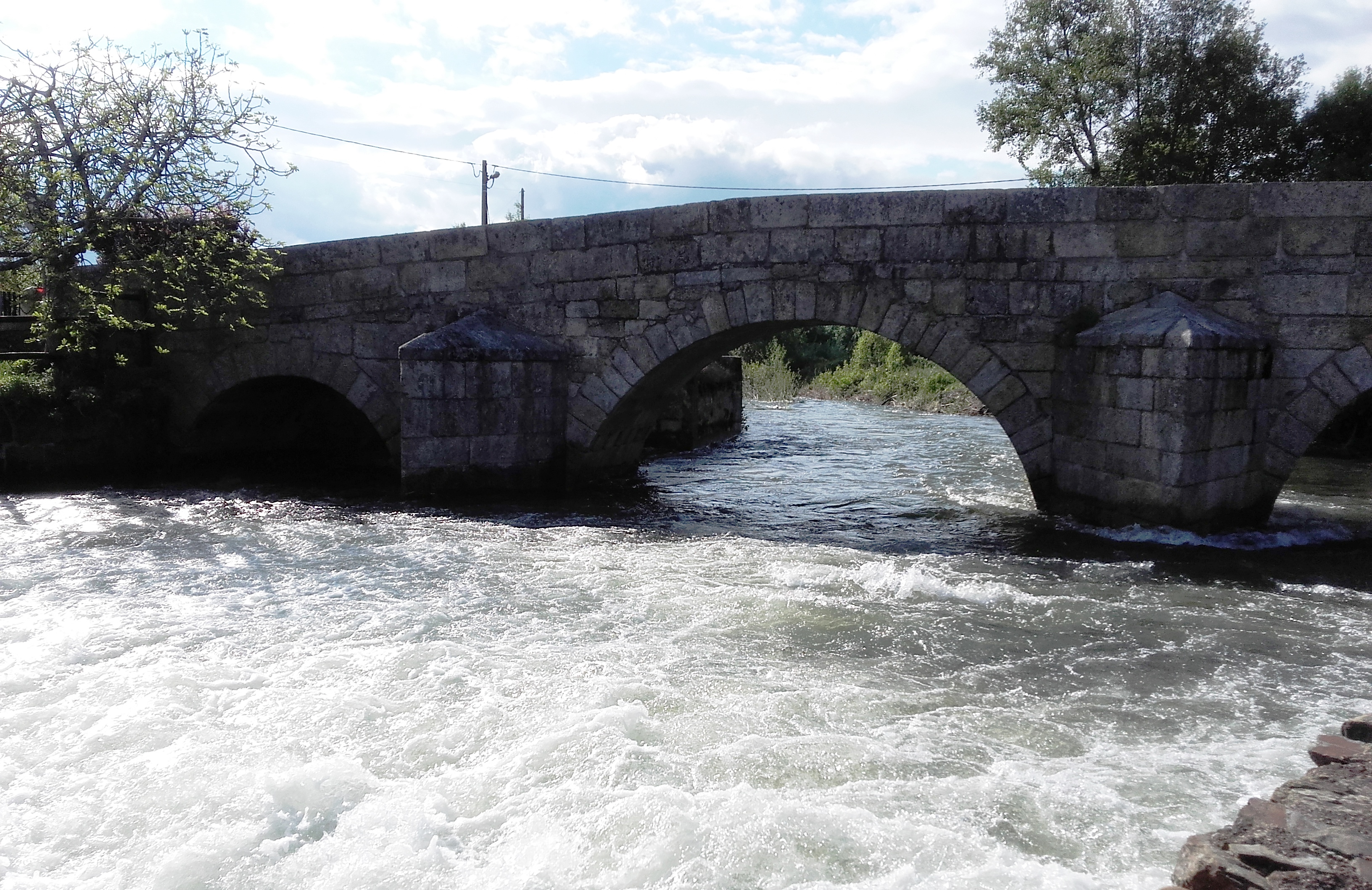
- Coordinates: 40.226291°N 7.187977°W
- Carries: vehicles and pedestrians
- Crosses: Ribeira de Meimoa
- Locale: Portugal, Penamacor, Meimoa
- Official name: Ponte Medieval da Ribeira de Meimoa e Nicho do Senhor dos Aflitos
- Heritage status: Property of Public Interest

Characteristics
- Total length: 70 metres (230 ft)
- Width: 3.7 metres (12 ft)

Location
- Interactive map of Ribeira de Meimoa Bridge

The Ponte da Ribeira de Meimoa is a medieval bridge that crosses the Ribeira de Meimoa, in the civil parish of Meimoa, municipality of Penamacor in Portuguese district of Castelo Branco.

== See also ==
- List of bridges in Portugal
