= Circular Pedestrian Bridge =

Bridge in Portugal

Circular Pedestrian Bridge Ponte Pedonal Circular
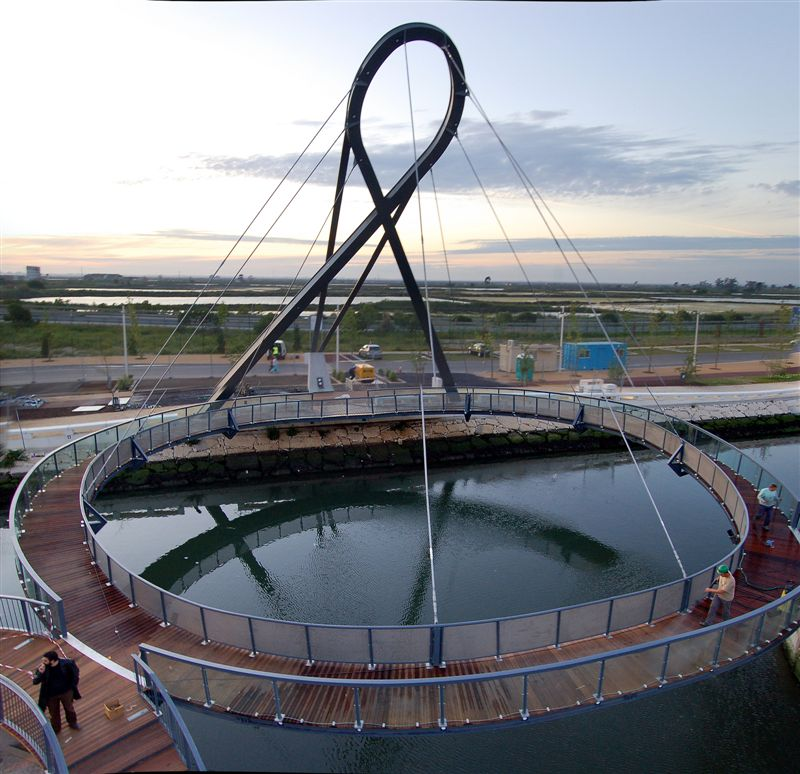
- Coordinates: 40°38′N 8°40′W

History
- Designer: Luís Viegas; Domingos Moreira

Circular Pedestrian Bridge, also known as Ponte do Laço, is a pedestrian steel bridge above the Canal de São Roque and the Canal dos Botirões, two of the channels of the Aveiro Lagoon. Designed by Luís Viegas and Domingos Moreira, the bridge features an "unusual" circular design that is supported in three margins and suspended by a mast. It opened to the public in May 2006.

== See also ==
- List of bridges in Portugal
