= Ponte de Assureira =

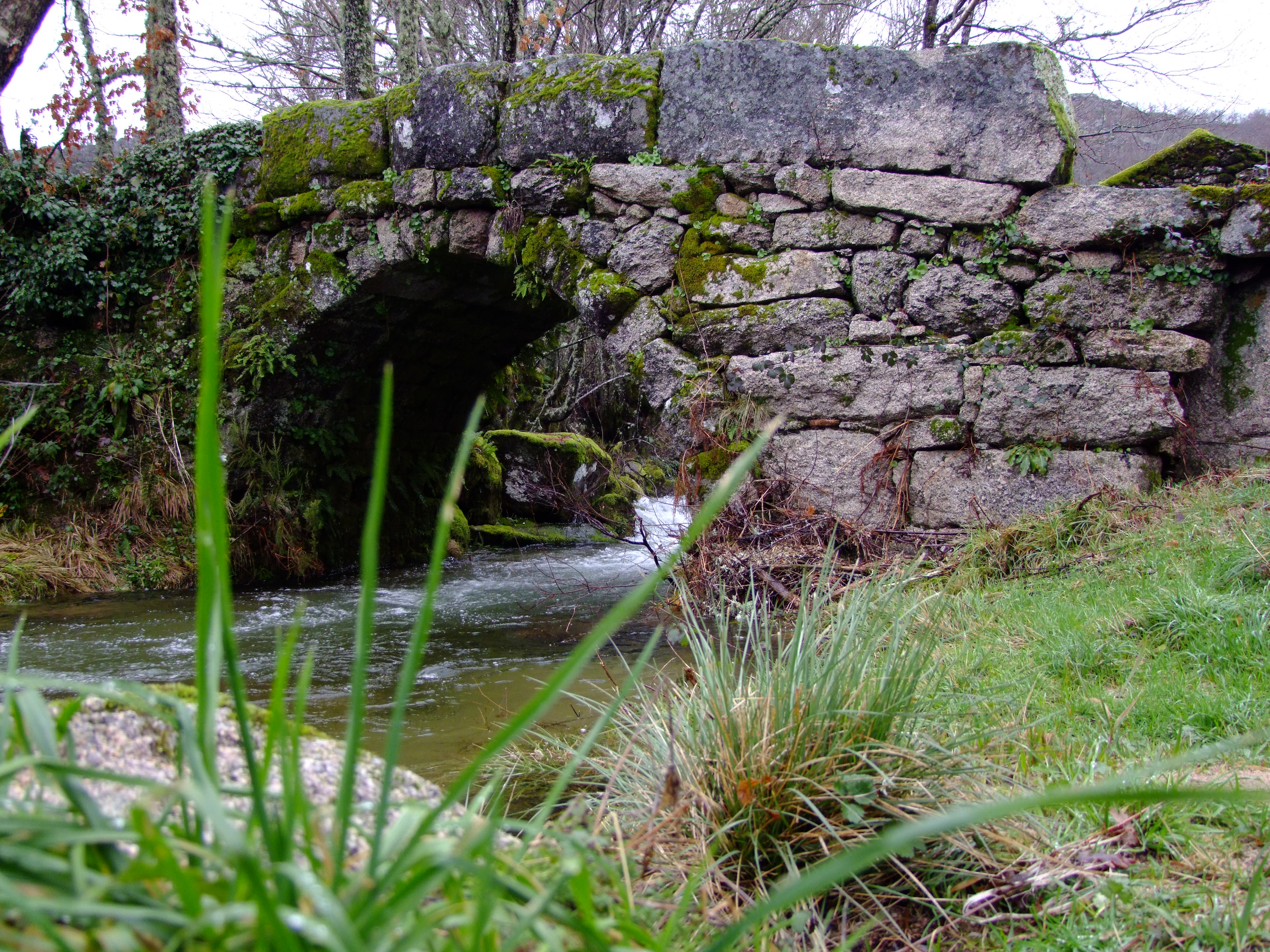
- Coordinates: 42°00′14″N 8°09′56″W
- Locale: Viana do Castelo District, Portugal

Ponte de Assureira is a bridge in Melgaço, Viana do Castelo District, Portugal.

== See also ==
- List of bridges in Portugal
