= Ponte de Gimonde =

Bridge in Portugal

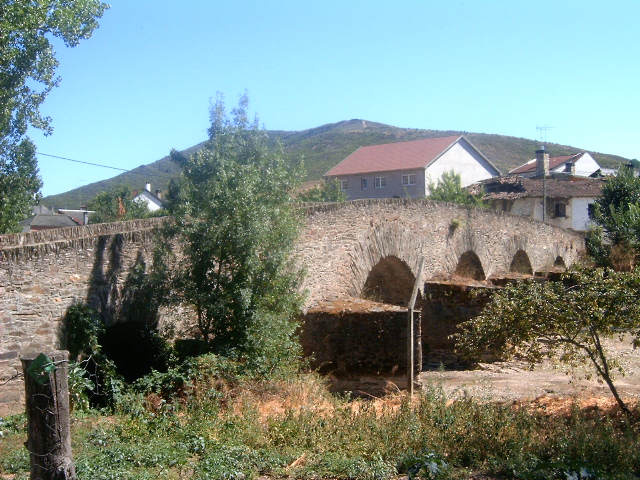
- Ponte Gimonde
- Coordinates: 41°48′13″N 6°41′50″W
- Locale: Bragança District, Portugal

Ponte de Gimonde is a bridge in Portugal. It is located in Bragança District.

== See also ==
- List of bridges in Portugal
