= Ponte de Portas de Ródão =

- Coordinates: 39°38′49″N 7°40′35″W
- Locale: Castelo Branco District, Portugal

Location
- Interactive map of Ponte de Portas de Ródão

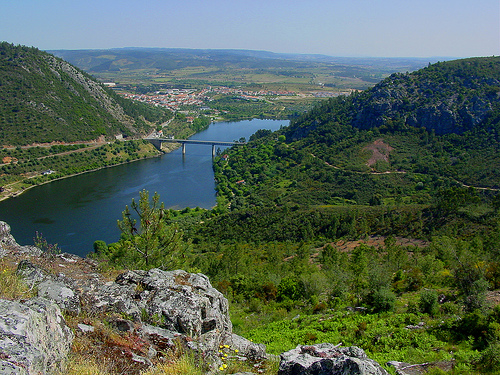
Tejo internacional.jpg

Ponte de Portas de Ródão is a bridge in Portugal. It is located in Castelo Branco District and crosses the Tejo River.

Constructed in 1877, it was designed by J. Bazan and remains in use to this day.

== See also ==
- List of bridges in Portugal
