= Ponte do Paul =

Paul Bridge Ponte do Paul
- Coordinates: 40°12′13″N 7°38′21″W
- Carries: vehicles/pedestrians
- Crosses: Rio Paúl
- Locale: Portugal, Covilhã, Paul
- Official name: Ponte do Pául

The Ponte do Paul is a bridge that crosses the Rio Paúl (Paul River), in the civil parish of Paul, municipality of Covilhã in the Portuguese in the district of Castelo Branco.

== History ==
The medieval bridge was constructed between the 13th and 14th century and maintains the original lines and construction.

The bridge was first referenced in the 1758 Memórias Paroquiais, a chronicle of civic communities.

In 1993, there was a project by the JAE to enlarge the bridge. A year later (on 12 April) the municipal council began to manage the bridge, owing to the necessity to expropriate lands for the expansion of the bridge. At the same time (23 April) the civil parish council debated the possibility of classifying the bridge a municipal patrimony, along with a mill and lagar, which was ultimately rejected. Between May and July, the civil parish requested that the municipality should examine the bridge and ascertain it patrimonial importance. On 16 July, the executive communicated to the council their attempts to classify the bridge, even as the first expropriations were undertaken. On 31 August, the municipal council proposed the classification of the bridge, which was later supported by the 24 January 1995 decision by the Regional Directorate of Castelo Branco to open a process to classify the bridge on 24 February. The national IPPAR would eventually impede the expansion and proposed the construction of alternative bridge along the river.

== Architecture ==
The bridge is situated along the accessway to the urban centre of the civil parish of Paúl, for those travelling from the city of Covilhã.

The three-arch bridge is constructed of granite.

== See also ==
- List of bridges in Portugal
