= Ponte Velha de Padastros =

Ponte Velha (Macieira de Cambra)
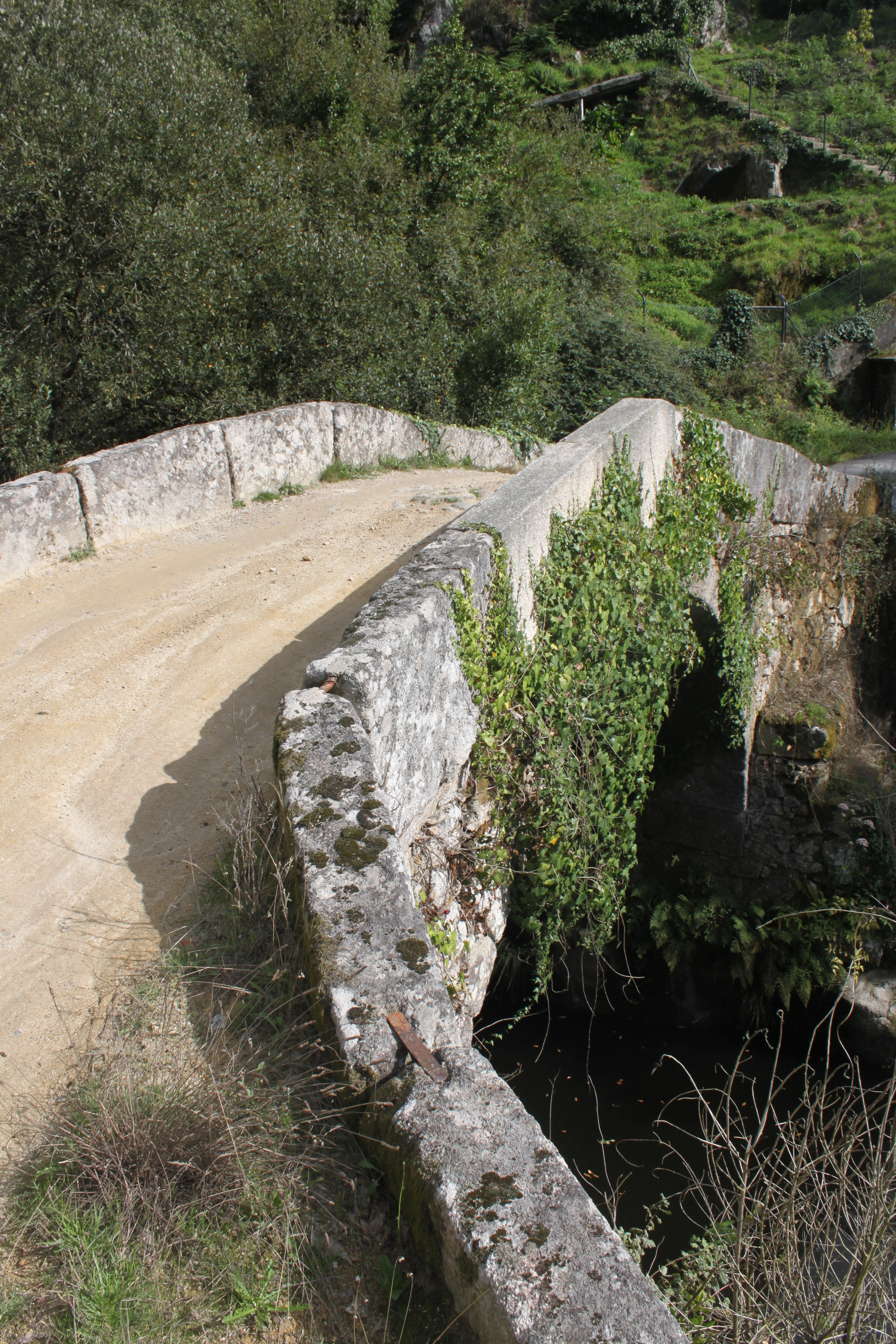
- Coordinates: 40°51′00″N 8°21′54″W
- Locale: Aveiro District, Portugal

Ponte Velha (Macieira de Cambra) is a bridge in Portugal. It is located in Vale de Cambra, Aveiro District. It is a granite and masonry single arch bridge that was built in the 18th and 19th centuries. It is listed by the Direção-Geral do Património Cultural.

== See also ==
- List of bridges in Portugal
