= Ponte metálica de Fão =

Fão Bridge, Bridge at Fão Ponte de Fão
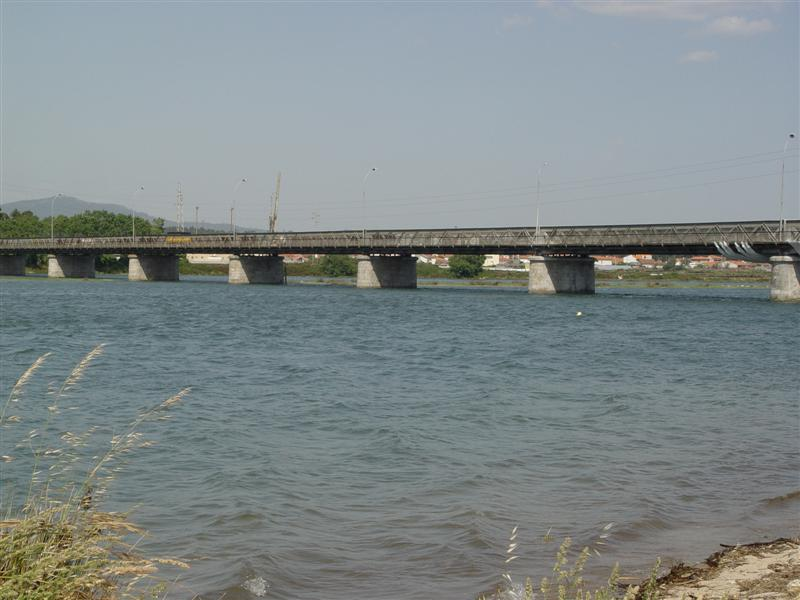
- Fão Bridge seen from South bank
- Coordinates: 41°30′55″N 8°46′21″W
- Carries: Road traffic
- Crosses: Cávado River
- Locale: Fão, Esposende, Braga District, Portugal
- Official name: Ponte de Fão
- Maintained by: Estradas de Portugal
- Heritage status: January 3, 1986

Characteristics
- Design: Brown Truss
- Material: Cast iron
- Total length: 267.6 m
- Width: 9.44
- Longest span: 38.5 m
- No. of spans: 267.6 m

History
- Designer: Abel Maria Mota
- Constructed by: Empresa Industrial Portuguesa
- Construction start: 1890
- Construction end: 1892
- Opened: August 7, 1892

The Ponte metálica de Fão is a bridge in Portugal at Fão. It is located in Braga District, crossing the Cávado River, on the EN 13 (National Road 13 - Porto-Valença). It connects Fão to Esposende.

== History ==
The bridge was designed by Abel Maria da Mota, built by Empresa Industrial Portuguesa of Lisbon, between 1889 and 1892. The field works were supervised by M. Reynaud. The inauguration took place on August 7, 1892, and was named Luis Filipe Bridge in honor of the then Prince Royal of Portugal. Fão bridge was classified has a Public Interest Building on January 3, 1986. The bridge underwent major restoration and reinforcement works in 2005–2006.

== Characteristics ==
The bridge has a cast iron Brown truss type structure, with twelve panels and lies supported by 7 rectangular pillars of masonry and granite stonework buried 15 m deep. The total length of 267 m

== See also ==
- List of bridges in Portugal
