= Ponte Romana do Rio Brenhas =

Bridge in the Portuguese district of Beja

Roman bridge of Rio Brenhas Ponte Romana do Rio Brenhas
- Coordinates: 38°08′47″N 7°26′38″W
- Locale: Portugal, Moura, Moura (Santo Agostinho e São João Baptista) e Santo Amador
- Official name: Ponte Romana sobre o Rio Brenhas
- Other name(s): Ponte Romana do Rio Moura/Ponte de Moura
- Heritage status: Property of Public Interest; Imóvel de Interesse Público

The Ponte Romana do Rio Brenhas (Roman bridge of Rio Brenhas), sometimes known simply as the Ponta Romana de Moura or Ponte de Moura, is a bridge built during the Roman occupation of the Iberian peninsula, that crosses the River Brenhas in the civil parish of Moura (Santo Agostinho e São João Baptista) e Santo Amador in the municipality of Moura in the Portuguese district of Beja.

== History ==
It was constructed during the Roman occupation, and integrated with the Via de Ebora, that began in the Rossio do Carmo and extended to the port of Ébora, along the Guadiana River, linking the Roman villa along the Ribeira de Ardila.

== Architecture ==
The bridge is located off the EN255 roadway, along a dirt road upon exiting the city of Moura in the direction of Amareleja. It is situated along an isolated, rural plain surrounded by olive orchards and dense vegetation.

== See also ==
- List of bridges in Portugal
