= Ponte de Praia da Barra =

Bridge in Aveiro district, Portugal

Bridge of Praia da Barra Ponte de Praia da Barra
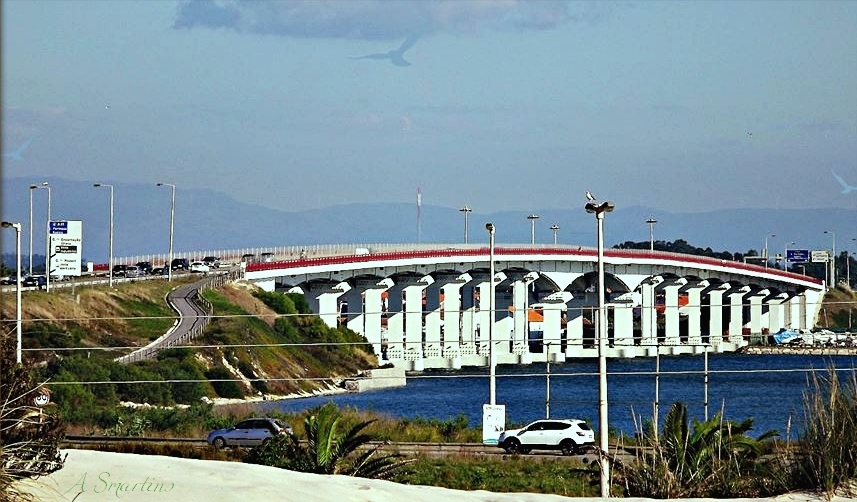
- Coordinates: 40°37′48″N 8°44′19″W
- Locale: Portugal, Ílhavo, Gafanha da Nazaré
- Official name: Ponte de Praia da Barra
- Other name: Ponte da Barra

Characteristics
- Design: Modern
- Material: Reinforced concrete

History
- Designer: unknown

Location
- Interactive map of Bridge of Praia da Barra

The Bridge of Praia da Barra (Portuguese: Ponte de Praia da Barra) is a modern bridge, situated over a confluence of the Ria Aveiro, in the civil parish of Gafanha da Nazaré, municipality of Ílhavo, in the Portuguese district of Aveiro. The bridge is situated on the western coast of Portugal, in the district of Aveiro, where the Ria Aveiro connects to the Atlantic Ocean.

To the south is the beach of Costa Nova do Prado and north by the beach of São Jacinto. Nearby is the lighthouse of Ponte da Barra and coastal seawall, that delimits the 500 metres (1,600 ft) southern entrance to the port of Aveiro. The breakwater separates the northern and southern beaches, is close to the Church of the Sagrada Família and campsite of Barra, that belong to the tourist route of Luz/Centro.

== See also ==
- List of bridges in Portugal
