= Ponte D. Maria =

D. Maria Bridge Ponte D. Maria
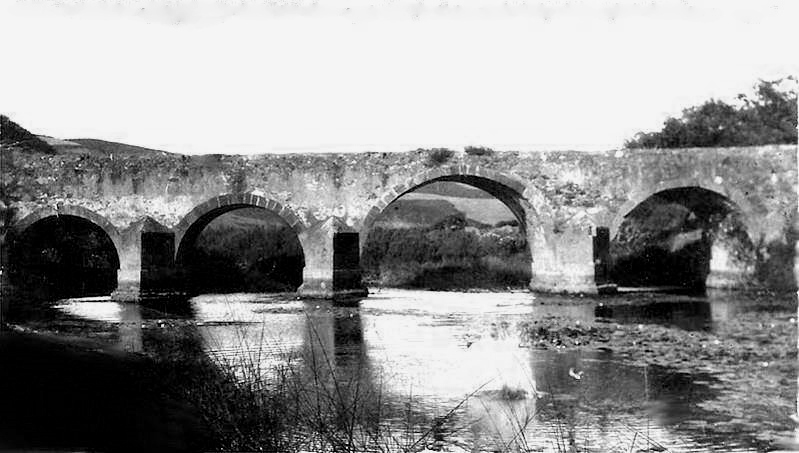
- Coordinates: 37.5100362°N 8.4677331°W
- Carried: Pedestrian
- Crossed: River Mira
- Locale: Portugal, Odemira, Santa Clara-a-Velha
- Official name: Ponte de D. Maria
- Other name(s): Ponte de Santa Clara-a-Velha
- Heritage status: Municipal Interest

Characteristics
- Material: Limestone

History
- Designer: Francisco Lopes do Rosário
- Construction end: 1758
- Collapsed: Yes

Ponte D. Maria (D. Maria Bridge) is an 18th-century bridge which crosses the River Mira in the civil parish of Santa Clara-a-Velha in the municipality of Odemira in the Portuguese district of Beja. It is an 18th-century structure that was constructed on the Roman model, allowing it to remain a functional span until the 19th century, when iron structures were introduced in the region.

== History ==
A 1748 travellers guide mentioned the locality of Santa Clara as a point of passage between Lisbon and Albufeira, later confirmed by 18th century maps. It is likely a construction that occurred in 1758, at a time when the clergy of Sabóia and S. Clara-a-Velha affirmed that no bridge existed on the Mira River.

By the end of the 19th century, maps of the period did not show any roads passing through Santa Clara, even though the village had three stations for changing horses or stopping the night. In 1822, the construction or expansion of the bridge occurred, under the direction of Francisco Lopes do Rosário, and located in relation to an ancient Roman road that connected Beja to the Algarve. Remnants of the former crossing over the River Mira have been lost.

By 1849, the municipal council of Odemira referred to the need to reconstruct the "old bridge" in Santa Clara and the advantage of constructing the new structure at the edge of the village.

At the end of the 19th century, the master of public works wrote an inspection report referring to the old masonry bridge over the River Mira along the road between Alentejo and Algarve, a distance of 1 kilometre (0.62 mi) from the village of Santa Clara. In his report, the inspector found the bridge in a terrible state of conservation, with many great fractures along the central vaults, causing depression in the pavement, where water coalesced and accumulated, draining along the cracks...where vehicles pass. The author lamented the state of such an important construction and recommended urgent repair.

By the middle of the 20th century, there was a partial landslide. On 25 February 1992, by dispatch of the IPPC, the bridge was classified as Property of Public Interest, and by 31 October 1996, similarly by the IPPAR. On 25 August 2000, it was included in the Odemira PDM (resolution 114/2000, DR 196).

== Architecture ==
The bridge is located in an isolated, rural position at the end of a valley, crossed by the River Mira, whose margins are densely populated by forest and water lilies. It is an area of great natural landscape, situated near the Pousada de Santa Clara, Santa Clara dam and the community cemetery.

The structure consists of stone and limestone masonry, plastered and whitewashed, with arched frames and breakwaters coated stone. The bridge, now ruined, still includes two arches with archivolts and masonry.

== See also ==
- List of bridges in Portugal
