= Ponte da Ribeira de Cobres =

Ribeira de Cobres Bridge Ponte da Ribeira de Cobres
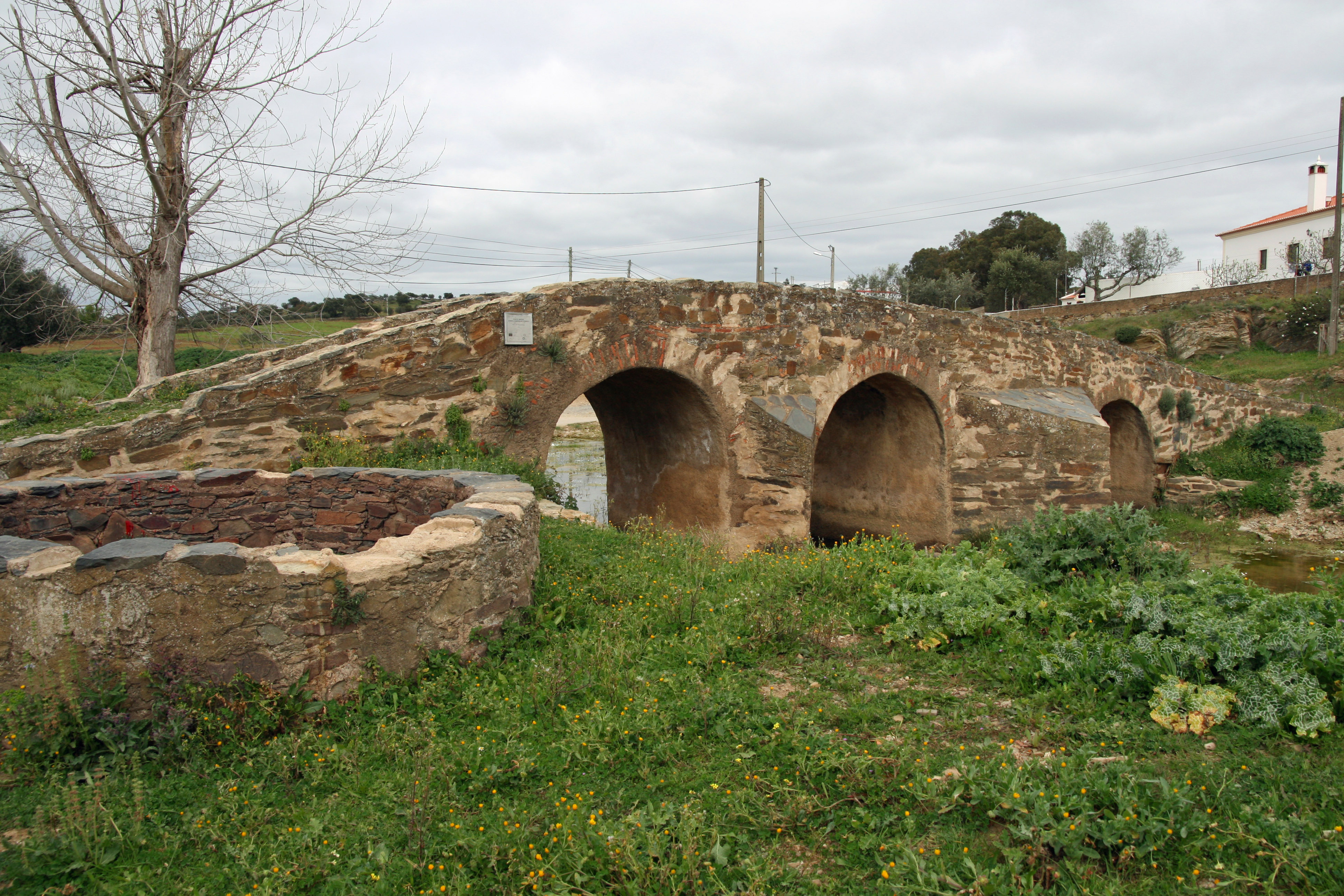
- Coordinates: 37.512°N 8.056°W
- Locale: Portugal, Almodôvar, Almodôvar e Graça dos Padrões
- Heritage status: Property of Public Interest

Characteristics
- Material: Stone masonry (shale), milled brick arches
- Total length: 25 metres (82 ft)
- Width: 3.6 metres (12 ft)

History
- Construction start: 12th century
- Construction end: 13th century

The Ponte da Ribeira de Cobres (Bridge of Ribeira dos Cobres) is a bridge in the civil parish, in the municipality of Almodôvar in the Portuguese district of Beja.

== History ==
The bridge has been dated to between the 12th and 13th century, using shale rock.

By 1758 it was the only bridge crossing the Ribeira dos Cobres.

The bridge was greatly damaged following seasonal storms in 1970, and repaired in the proceeding months.

== Architecture ==
Situated in a transition zone between agricultural lands and urbanized areas, with modern buildings within its proximity (specifically the quartel of the volunteer firefighters). It is located in a valley crossing the Ribeira de Cobres, oriented from east to west, alongside a rural road, 150 metres (490 ft) from the new bridge (linking the margins along the E.N.267).

The bridge is a three arch structure, consisting of three 2.5 metres (8.2 ft) wide arches. Two of these arches are separated from the remaining arch by a reinforced contraforte, with the eastern side of the bridge larger than the western. The platform is protected by shale railing, and is 25 metres (82 ft) long by 3.6 metres (12 ft) wide.

== See also ==
- List of bridges in Portugal
