= Ponte do Castelo do Mau Vizinho =

Ponte do Castelo
- Coordinates: 40°51′06″N 8°21′10″W
- Locale: Aveiro District, Portugal

Location
- Interactive map of Ponte do Castelo

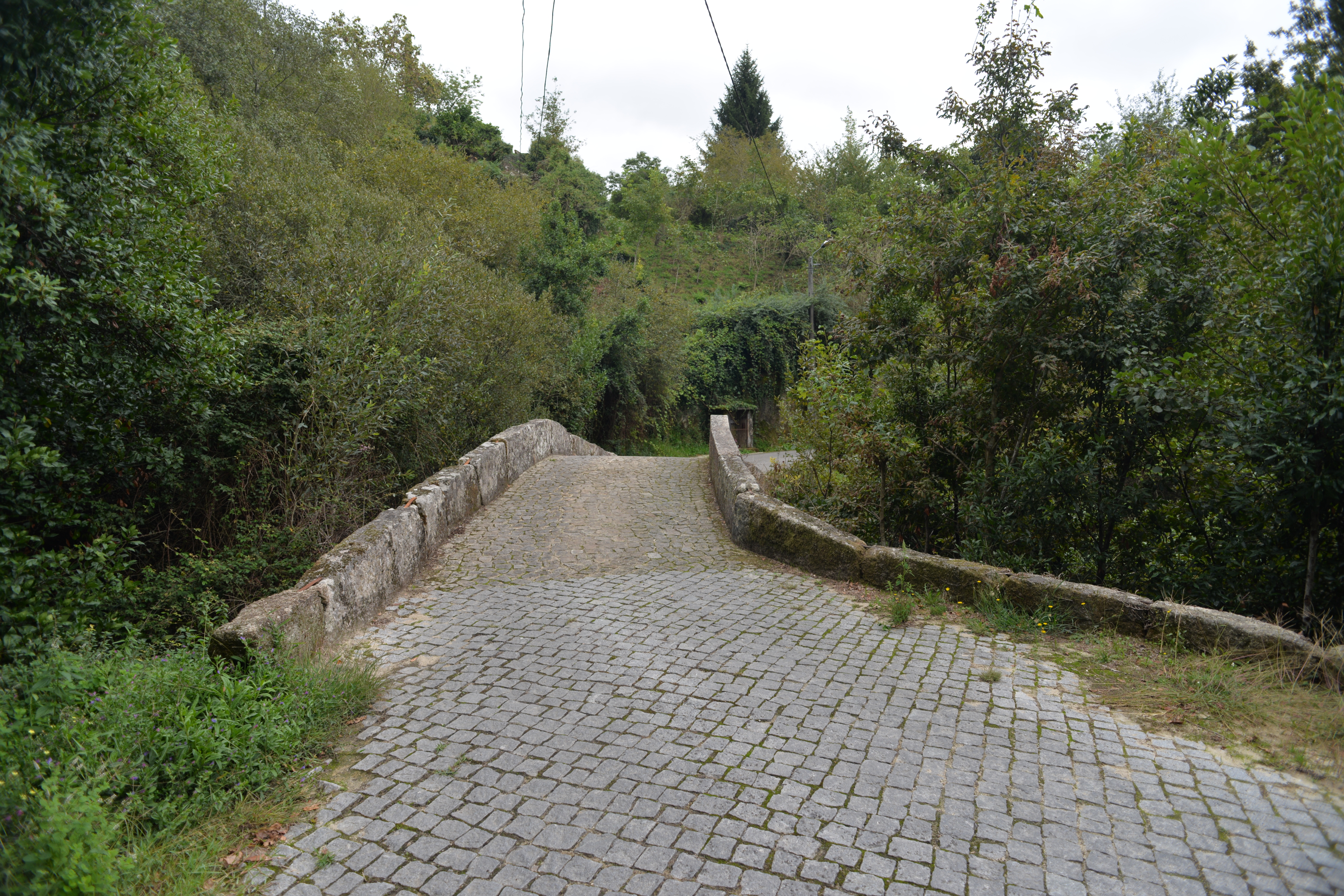
Ponte do Castelo bridge, 2020

Ponte do Castelo is a bridge in Portugal. It is located in Aveiro District.

== See also ==
- List of bridges in Portugal
