= Ponte Velha de São Pedro da Torre =

Old Bridge of São Pedro da Torre Ponte Velha de São Pedro da Torre
- Coordinates: 41.987698°N 8.668594°W
- Locale: Portugal, Valença, São Pedro da Torre
- Official name: Ponte Velha de São Pedro da Torre
- Heritage status: Property of Public Interest; Imóvel de Interesse Público

Characteristics
- Material: Granite

History
- Construction start: 13th century
- Construction end: 14th century

Ponte Velha de São Pedro da Torre is a bridge in the civil parish of São Pedro da Torre, municipality of Valença in the Portuguese district of Viana do Castelo.

== History ==
During the Roman period, this area was part of the Lima to Minho axis, a roadway that connected Braga to the northwestern peninsula, and was a point of passage, if not terminal line (from conclusions of Ferreira de Almeida in 1987). In the immediate vicinity, in the local of Chamosinhos, are vestiges of Romana structures, and specifically a millenarian marker.

The bridge was re-constructed between the 13th and 14th century. The double ramp, which was not entirely horizontal, had some interventions in order support the structure. Although it maintained its semi-perfect Roman arch, the fact that the staves were "long and narrow" indicates that the bridge was reconstructed. Medieval reforms during the time affected eastern territories, allowing more human migration and helping to support inter-regional commercial traffic, substantiating the idea that the bridge was reconstructed during the time.

Meanwhile, other opinions point to its re-construction during the modern epoch.

== Architecture ==
The bridge is situated in an urban area, crossing the main river in the settlement of São Pedro da Torre, surrounded by a few buildings. In the same settlement, almost 100 metres (330 ft) is another smaller bridge over the same river.

The bridge maintains some of the characteristics attributable to the Roman period: which include the "Roman" arch and double ramp, its regular base and pavement, which is still largely Roman in nature, using large, homogeneous slabs and carefully placed.

The platform is preceded by access ramps, and the platform constructed of Portuguese pavement forms a trestle that is almost imperceivable over a single arch. Constructed of granite blocks/slabs, simple guardrails flank either side of the platform. At the midpoint of the bridge is a socle with stone cross, where a wooden image of a crucified Christ is situated.

== See also ==
- List of bridges in Portugal
