= Ponte de Mértola =

Bridge in Beja, Portugal

Old Bridge of Mértola Ponte Velha de Mértola
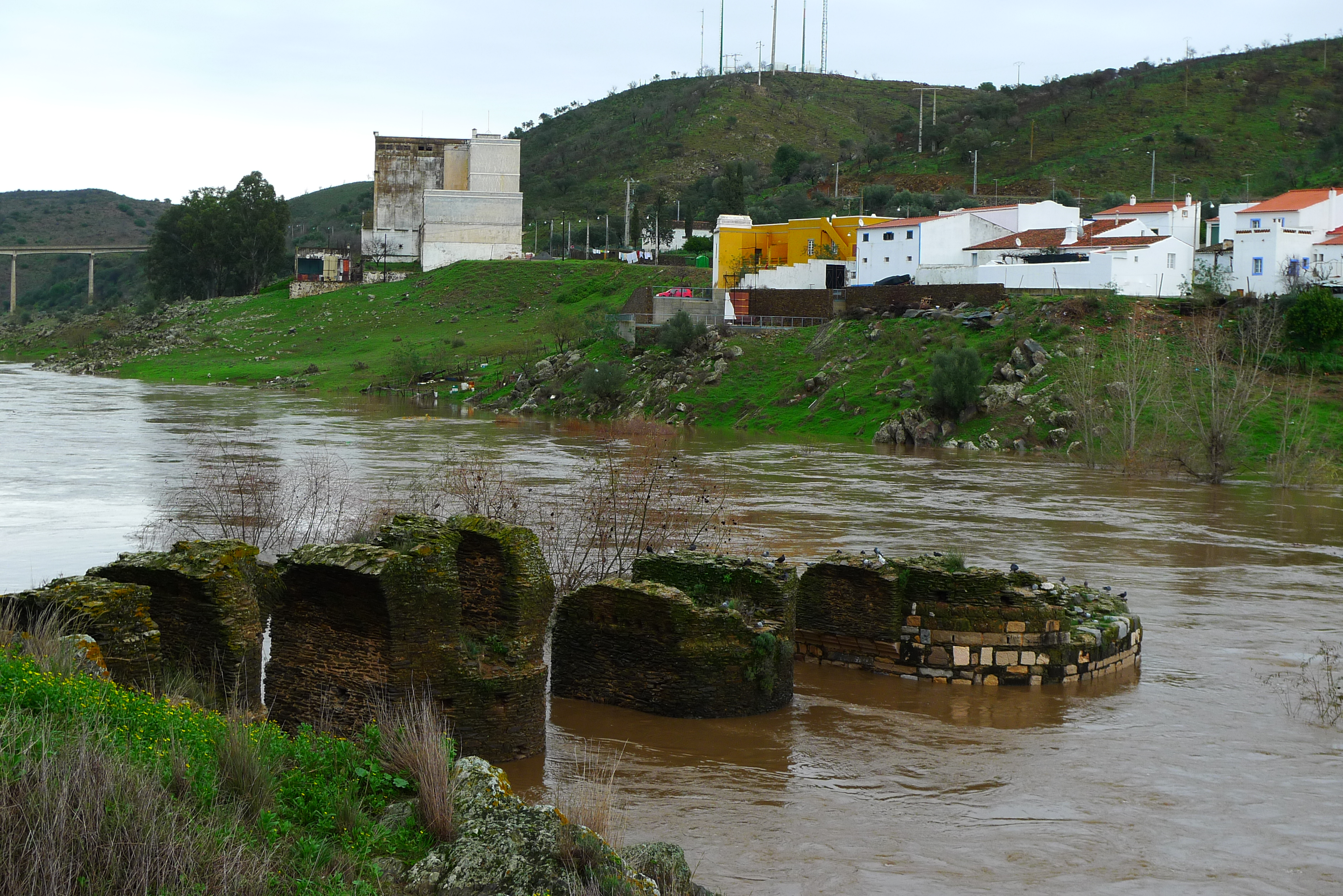
- A view of the "Old Bridge" looking across to the other bank in Mértola
- Coordinates: 37°38′08.9″N 7°39′51.1″W
- Locale: Mértola, Alentejo
- Official name: Ponte Velha sobre o Guadiana/Ponte Branca/Torre do Rio
- Heritage status: National Monument

Characteristics
- Material: Shale and granite

History
- Designer: unknown
- Construction start: 9th century
- Construction end: 12th century

The Ponte Velha de Mértola ("Old Bridge of Mértola"), also referred to as the Ponte Branca or Torre do Rio, is a structure located along the Guadiana River, in the civil parish of Mértola, municipality of Mértola, in the Portuguese district of Beja. Although named a bridge, the structure is the remains of a wharf and fortified port, linked to the defensive curtain of the walled city.

== History ==
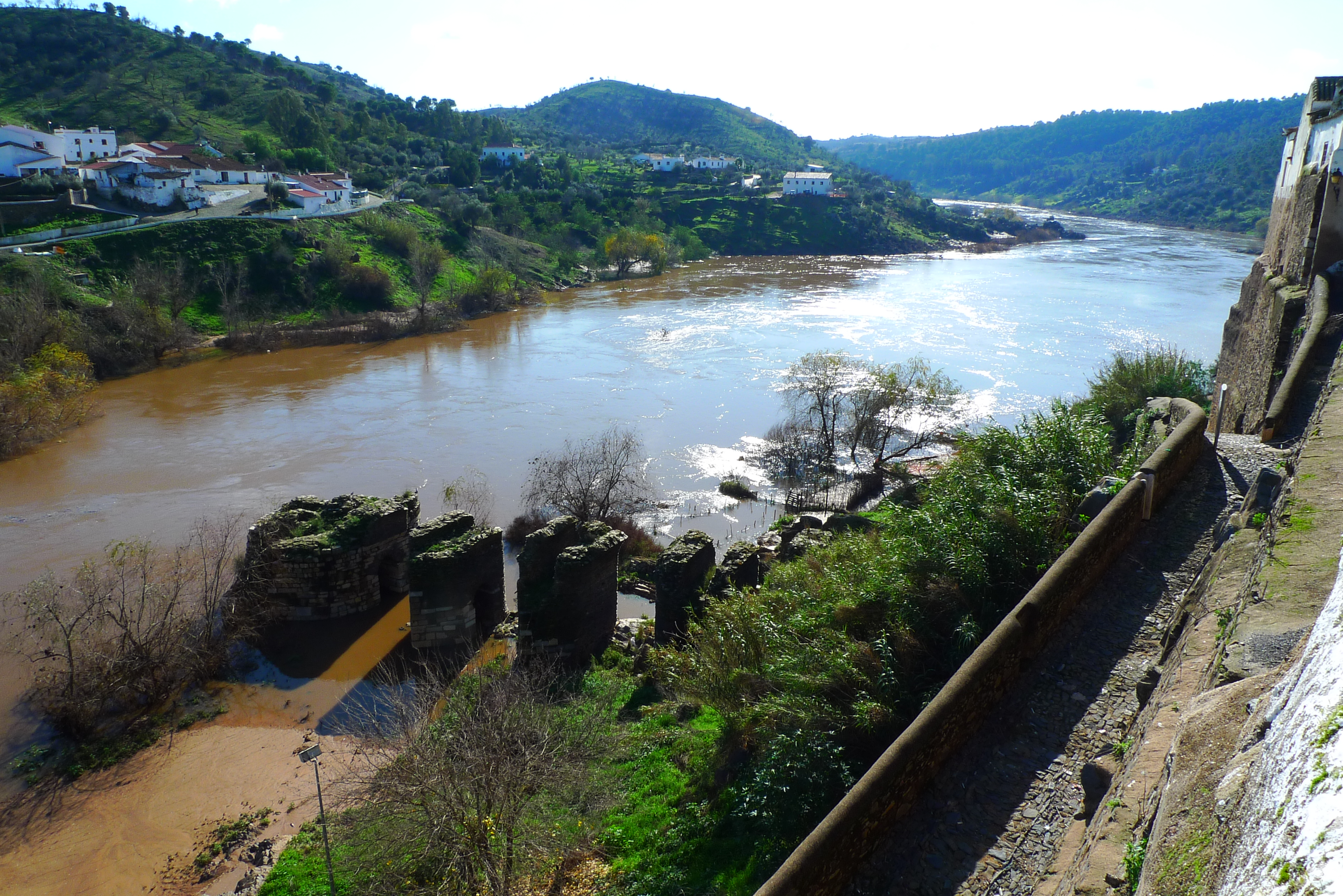
A view of the "Old Bridge" as seen from bank of the Castle of Mértola

It is difficult to attribute a valid chronology, because there are few comparable architectural structures; this structure was constructed between the 9th and late 12th centuries, during the Arab occupation of the Iberian peninsula. It is likely to have been destroyed at the end of the 12th century, when they abandoned the settlement.

The structure was successively confused with a bridge. It was referred to as a bridge in the 1254 foral (charter), in the design of the coat-of-arms of D. Duarte (dating to 1500), referring to as "the piers constructed by the Moors", in the Memórias Paroquiais.

In 1956, there was a decision by the Junta Autónoma de Estradas to recuperate the structure.

== Architecture ==
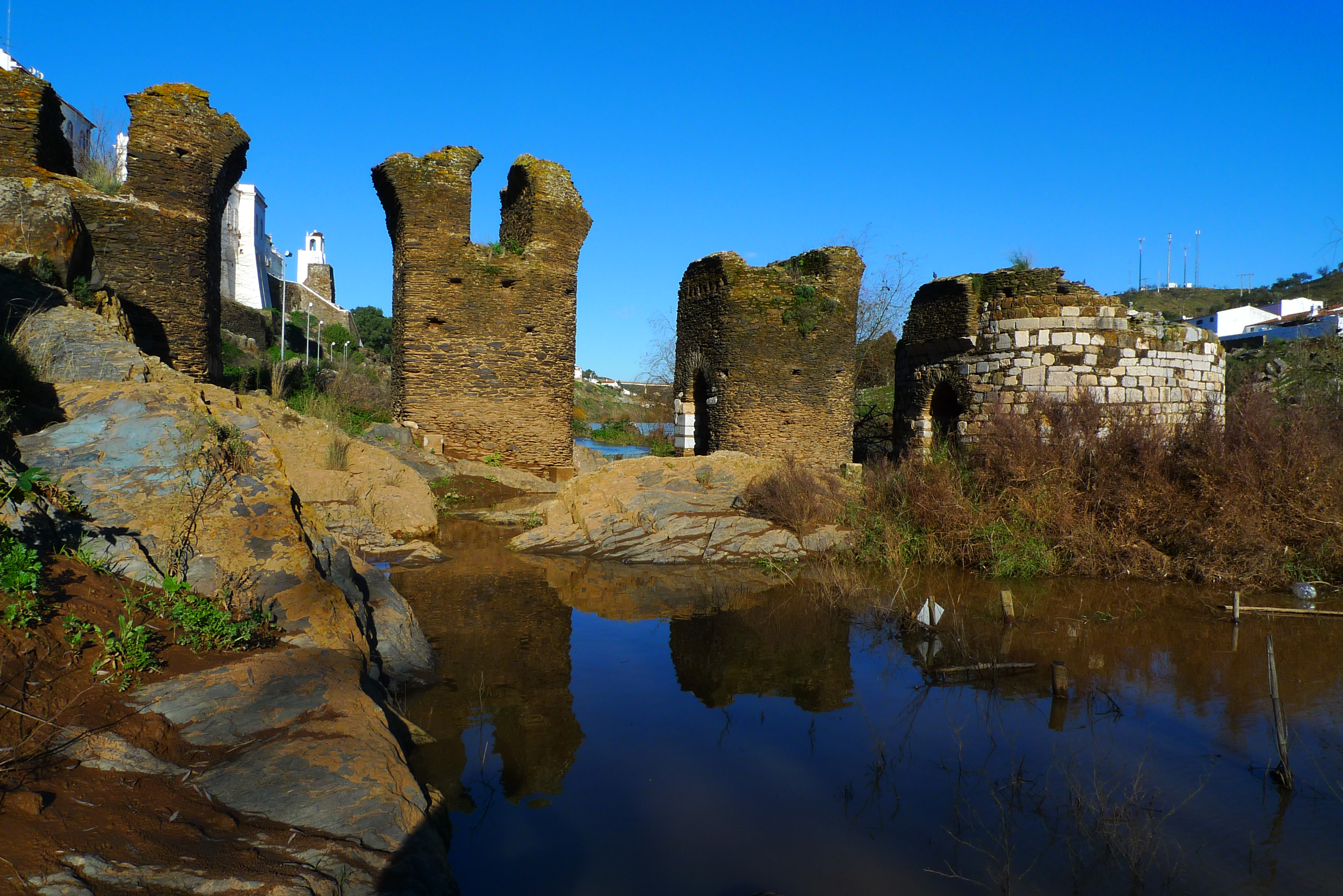
The vestiges of the main staves and defensive curtain

The remnants of the structure are situated on the right margin of the Guadiana River, alongside the walls of the old city of Mértola, near the Porta da Ribeira.

The vestiges of port and fortified wharf of which, only six piers in a curvilinear pattern, with half reinforced with talhmares, remain. There are no vestiges on the other margin of the river, and the depth of the river is such that it is difficult to mount other piers. In addition to protect the margin, the construction permits (in case of need) the passage to the other bank by barge, used in defense and access to water.

It is an aqueduct to support the village, comparable to ones found in Fez and Síria. It is a rare example of port and fortified wharf, constructed during the Muslim occupation, reusing the material remaining from the Roman residency.

== See also ==
- List of bridges in Portugal
