= Roman Bridge over the Ribeira de Odivelas =

Bridge in Portugal

Roman Bridge over the Ribeira de Odivelas Ponte romana sobre a ribeira de Odivelas
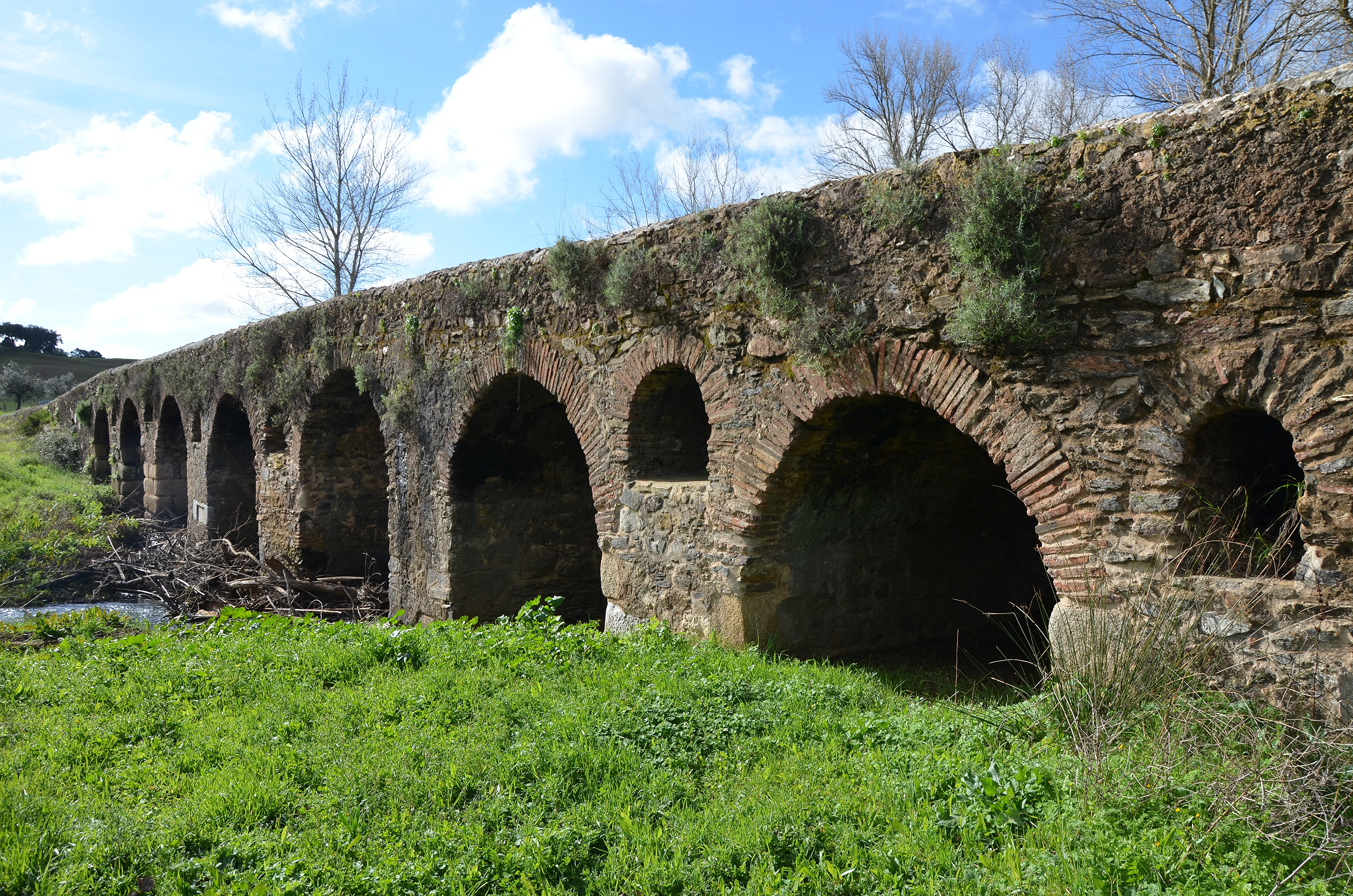
- Coordinates: 38.260°N 7.946°W
- Crosses: Odivelas river or stream
- Locale: Vila Ruiva, Cuba, Beja District, Portugal
- Other name(s): Ponte de Vila Ruiva
- Heritage status: Portuguese National Monument

Characteristics
- Material: Granite, limestone, schist, brick
- Total length: 120.00 metres (393.70 ft)
- Width: 4.90 metres (16.1 ft)
- Height: 5.30 metres (17.4 ft)
- No. of spans: 20

History
- Designer: Roman
- Construction start: 1st century BCE

The Roman Bridge over the Ribeira de Odivelas (Ponte romana sobre a ribeira de Odivelas), also known as the Bridge of Vila Ruiva, is located near Vila Ruiva in the municipality of Cuba in the Beja District of Portugal. It is still in use.

== History ==
The bridge is believed to have been part of a Roman road from Faro to Beja and Évora in Portugal, ending in Mérida in Spain. It is believed that the original three granite piers date back to between the 1st century BCE and the 1st century CE. Subsequently, it was reconstructed and extended on several occasions between the 5th and 11th centuries, during the Visigoth and Al-Andalus periods in Portugal, using material from the original bridge as well as new building materials, such as limestone, granite, schist, brick and even an old Roman gravestone. Further work was carried out in the 16th and 17th centuries, and more recently. As a consequence of the many interventions, the bridge lacks any architectural coherence. Its present appearance gives an incomplete understanding of its extent because silting has caused 15 arches to now be underground.

== Characteristics ==
The bridge is 120 metres long and between 4.9 and 5.6 metres wide. It has a maximum height of 5.3 metres. It creates a platform that allows the crossing not only of the Ribeira de Odivelas, on which 11 arches are located, but also facilitates the passage over the entire valley. Although some of the arches are not visible there are 20, of different sizes, as well as 16 eyeholes in the piers, which were designed to avoid damage to the bridge during flooding by maximising the potential flow of water. Signs on the bridge indicate the maximum level of waters during floods that occurred during the 20th century.

The bridge has been classified as a National Monument since 1967.

== See also ==
- List of Roman bridges
- List of bridges in Portugal
