= Ponte de Ázere =

Bridge in Portugal

- Locale: Arcos de Valdevez Municipality, Portugal

Ponte de Ázere is a bridge in Portugal, located in Arcos de Valdevez Municipality, Viana do Castelo District. It was first built in the 13th or 14th century, then later rebuilt in 1613 by João Rodrigues.

== See also ==
- List of bridges in Portugal
