= Ponte do Bico =

Crossing of the River Cávado, Braga District, Portugal

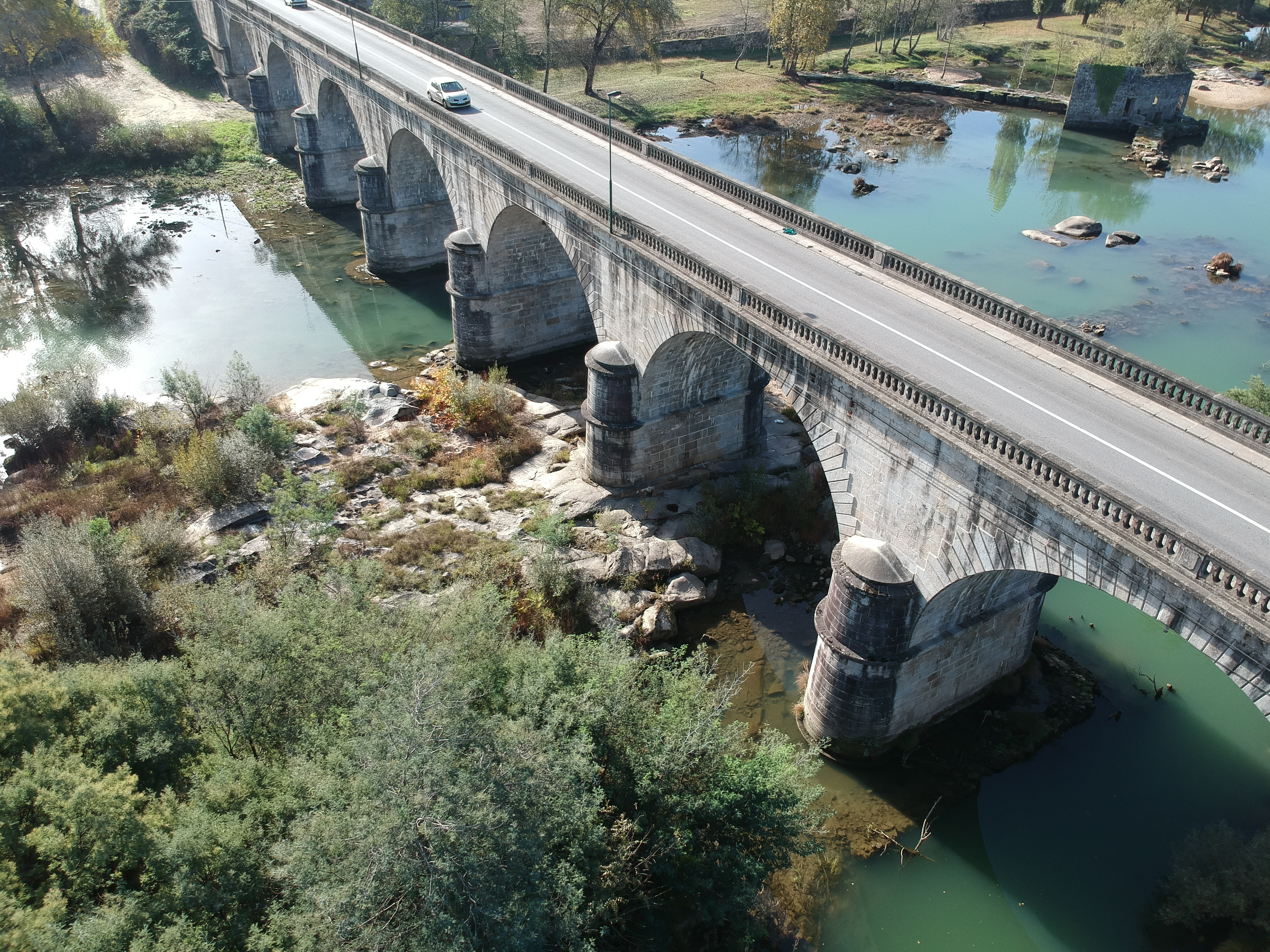
- Ponte do Bico
- Coordinates: 41°36′23″N 8°25′46″W
- Locale: Braga District, Portugal

Location
- Interactive map of Ponte do Bico

Ponte do Bico is a bridge in Portugal. It is located in Braga District, crossing the Cávado River.

It is a work from the time of minister Fontes Pereira de Melo who is mostly remembered for conducting dynamic industrial and public infrastructure policy which become known as Fontismo (after his name).

== See also ==
- List of bridges in Portugal
