= Ponte da Barbeita =

Bridge of Barbeita Ponte da Barbeita
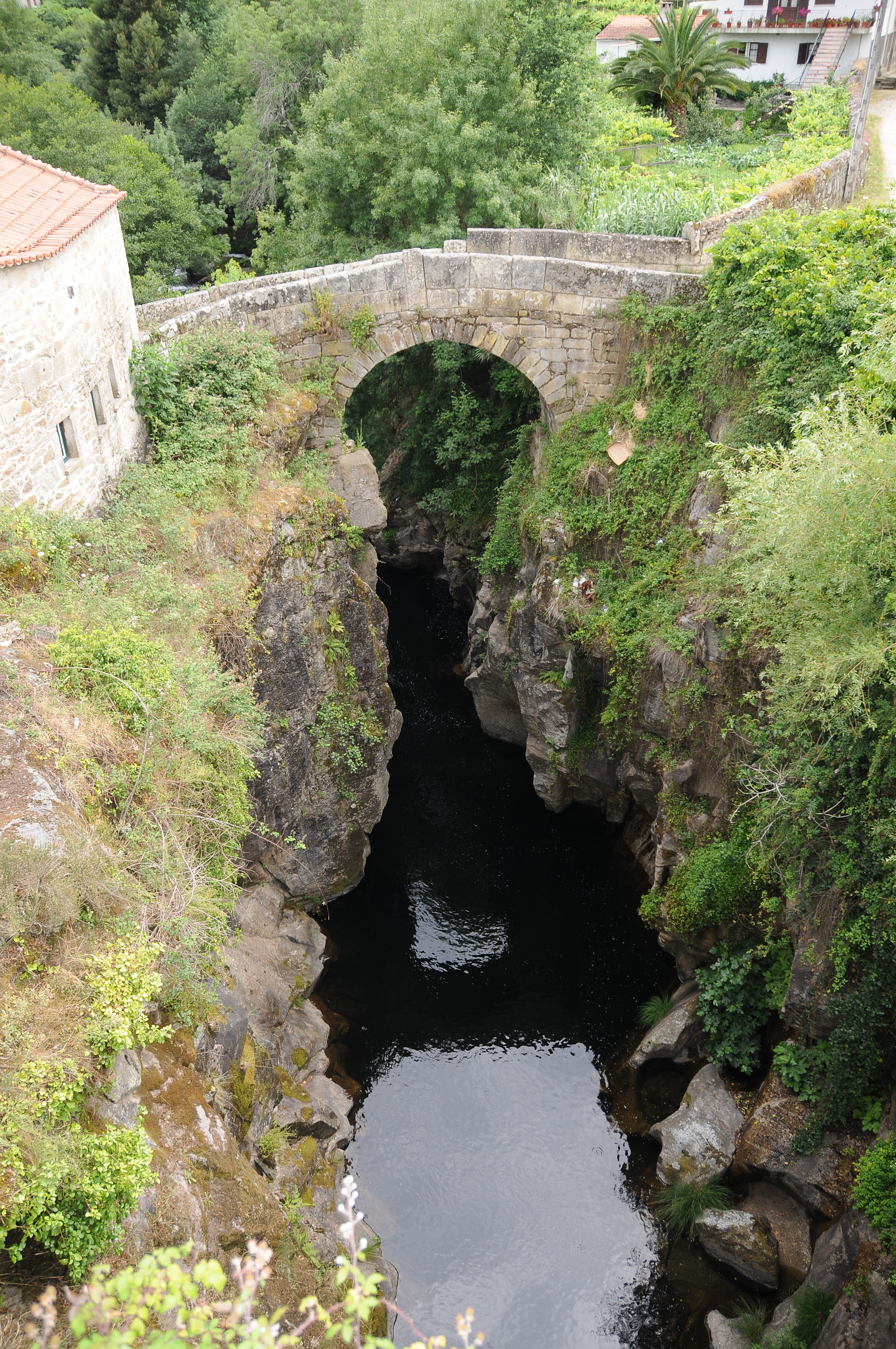
- Coordinates: 42°04′29″N 8°23′39″W
- Crosses: Rio Mouro
- Locale: Portugal, Monção, Barbeita
- Official name: Ponte Medieval sobre o Rio Mouro
- Other name: Ponte medieval que atravessa o rio de Mouro
- Heritage status: Property of Public Interest

Characteristics
- Material: Granite

The Ponte da Barbeita (Bridge of Barbeita) is a Gothic bridge that cross the Rio Mouro in the civil parish, municipality of Monção, in the Portuguese district of Viana do Castelo.

== History ==
The bridge was probably constructed in the 14th century.

On 1 November 1386, the army crossed the bridge during their clash with the Duke of Lancaster (Master of Avis), pretender to the throne of Castille and Leon.

The bridge is similar to various other medieval bridges that were based in older Roman structures that crossed rivers in the region, but reconstructed in the early Middle Ages. In actuality, there are few elements that can be attributed to the period, except the arch structure, "made up of sizable blocks of granite". Particularly their lower sections, may date from that time. Also the profile of the will, perfectly round, should be an element of the Roman period, subsequently kept in low-medieval reform, as much of the floor, based on large slabs of regular whittle. There is evidence that the bridge was reformed sometime between the 13th and 14th century. The platform with double non-horizontal ramp trestle, the integration of ashlars of lesser quality and formally heterogeneous, the narrowness of the road and the pavement, using small stones on the sidewalk, are the most obvious indicators. Moreover, the bridge has a slight curve, which may be a medieval feature (although shortened), yet the width of the structure is not a common typological feature of Roman public works. In 1386, the bridge was the location selected by King John I, and his future father-in-law, the Duke of Lancaster, in order to celebrate the accord between the "new" Portugal of Avis and England, that resulted in the marriage between the King John and Philippa of Lancaster. It is unclear, though, when the bridge was reformulated during the medieval bridge. Aníbal Soares Ribeiro suggests that it might have occurred around the 1480s.

The bridge was recuperated by Amaro Franco in 1627, receiving a stipend of 880,000 Portuguese reis for the service.

In 1864, the bridge was on the verge of ruin, with a missing section to the south, "in the vault and centre of the bridge, which if not remedied would result in danger", and excessive costs to the local parish. The decision must have been taken to construct a new bridge, parallel the medieval bridge, which was constructed in 1882.

On 1 December 1960, the municipal council inaugurated a commemorative plaque.

In 2006, the municipal council of Monção elaborated a plan to recuperate the zone, divided into two zones of intervention. The first included the space north between the EN202 and Rio Mouro and south from the cross of Nossa Senhora da Soledade and west; the second area included the parish of Ceivães.

== Architecture ==
The bridge is situated in an urbanized area, constructed over the margins of a great and deep gorge, carved from the Rio Mouro, a small affluent on the left branch of the Minho River, that separated the parishes of Barbeita and Ceivães. It is located alongside the parochial church, mill and other buildings, while overlooked by the modern bridge.

The single arch structure, is preceded by ramps, over a single, large round arc. Its pavement consists of large slabs and guards of primed block and plastered masonry.

== See also ==
- List of bridges in Portugal
