= Ponte de Vilela =

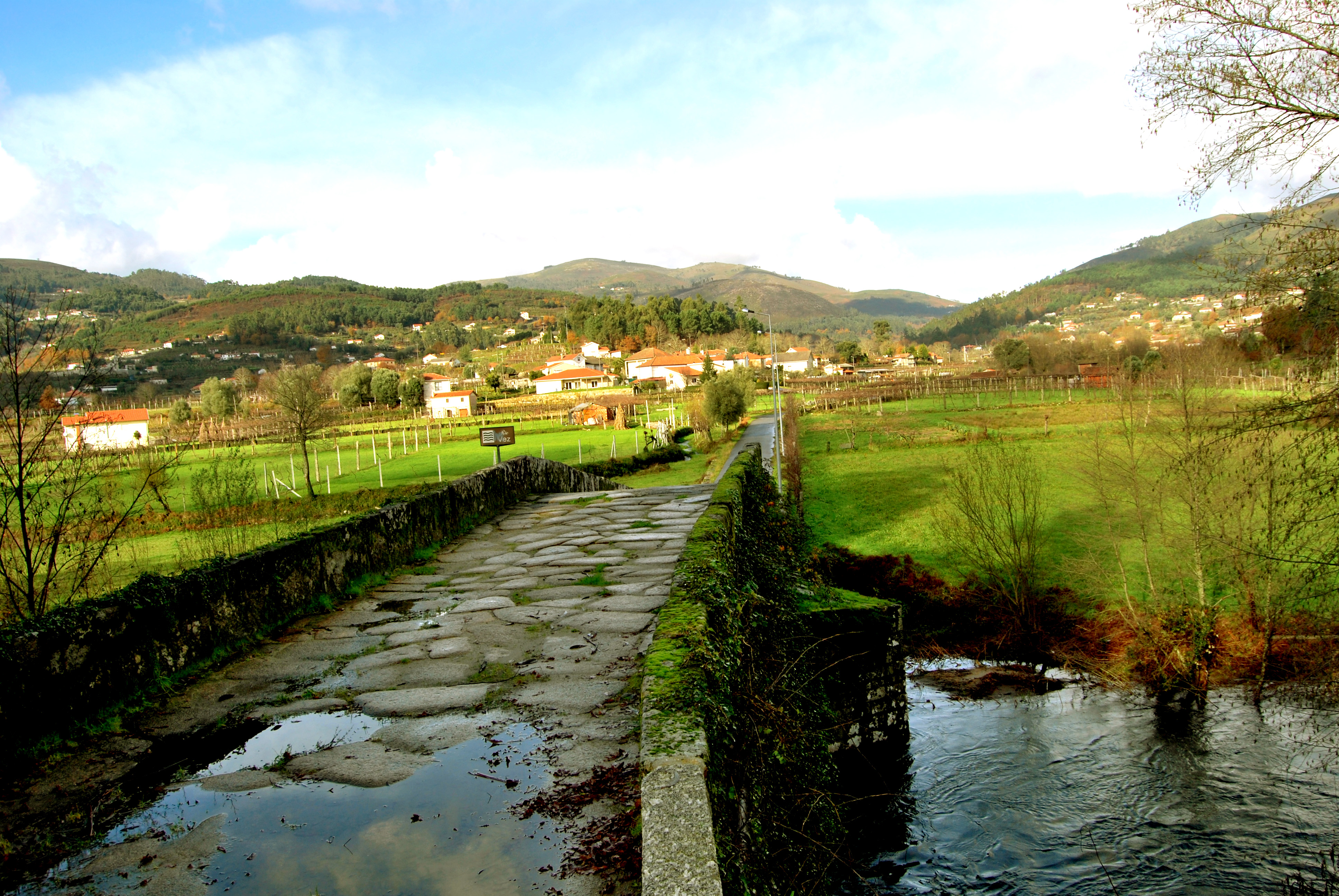
- Coordinates: 41°55′16″N 8°26′33″W
- Crosses: Vez River
- Locale: Viana do Castelo District, Portugal

Ponte de Vilela is a medieval bridge in Portugal. It is located in Arcos de Valdevez, Viana do Castelo District.

== See also ==
- List of bridges in Portugal
