= Ponte de Vilar de Mouros =

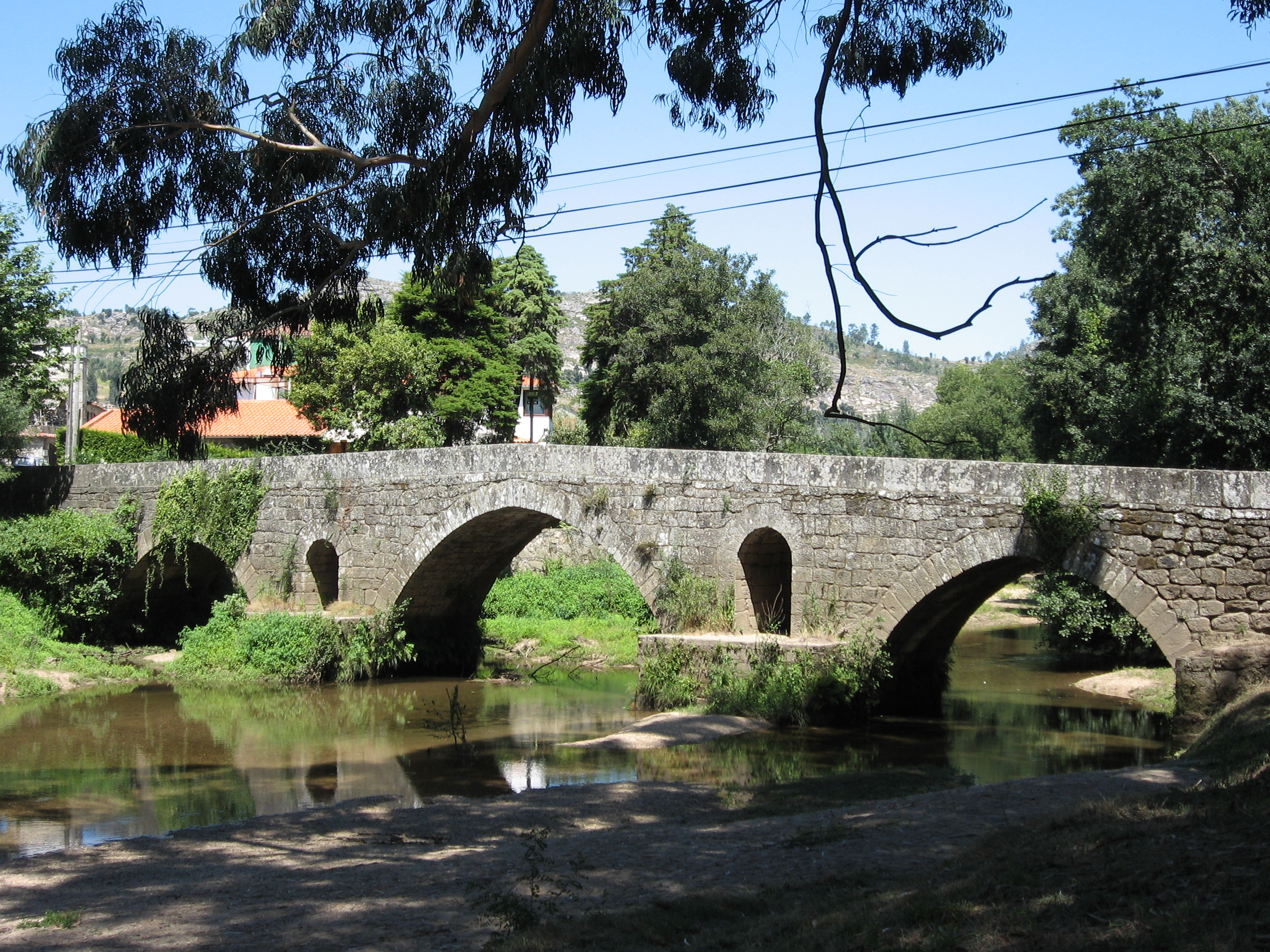
- Coordinates: 41°53′15″N 8°47′22″W
- Locale: Viana do Castelo District, Portugal

Vilar de Mouros Bridge crosses the Coura river in Vilar de Mouros, Portugal. It was classified as a National Monument in 1910.

== See also ==
- List of bridges in Portugal
