= Ponte de Coronados =

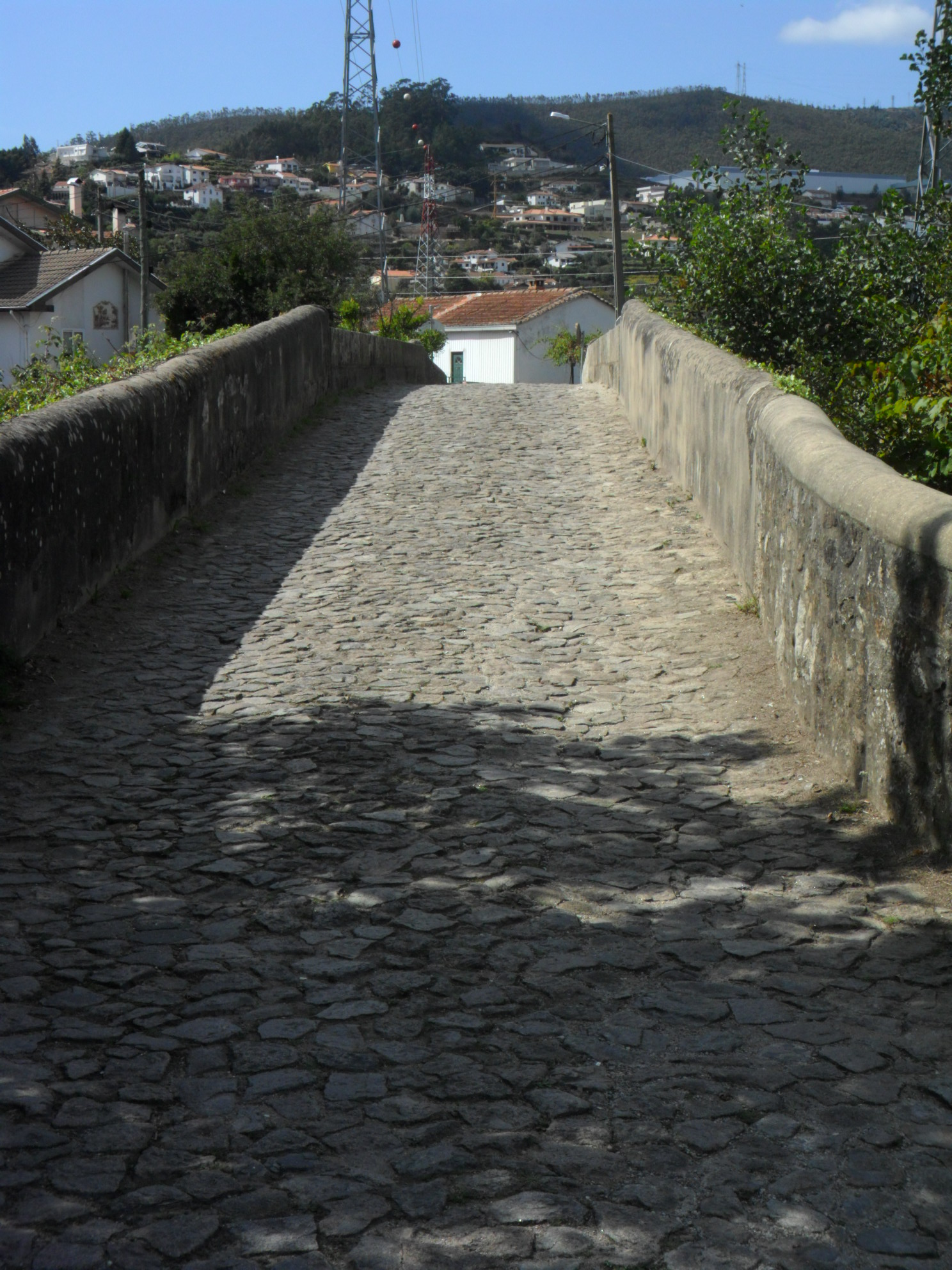
- Ponte de Coronados
- Coordinates: 40°50′09″N 8°23′59″W
- Locale: Aveiro District, Portugal

Ponte de Coronados is a bridge in the parish of São Pedro de Castelõe, Vale de Cambra, Portugal.

== See also ==
- List of bridges in Portugal
