= Ponte de Porto Cavalos =

Ponte de Cavalos
- Coordinates: 40°50′27″N 8°20′58″W
- Locale: Vale de Cambra, Aveiro District, Portugal

Location
- Interactive map of Ponte de Cavalos

Ponte de Cavalos is a bridge in Portugal. It is located in Vale de Cambra, Aveiro District.

== See also ==
- List of bridges in Portugal
