= Ponte da Pica =

Bridge in Oliveira de Azeméis, Portugal

Coordinates: 40°52′11″N 8°29′14″W

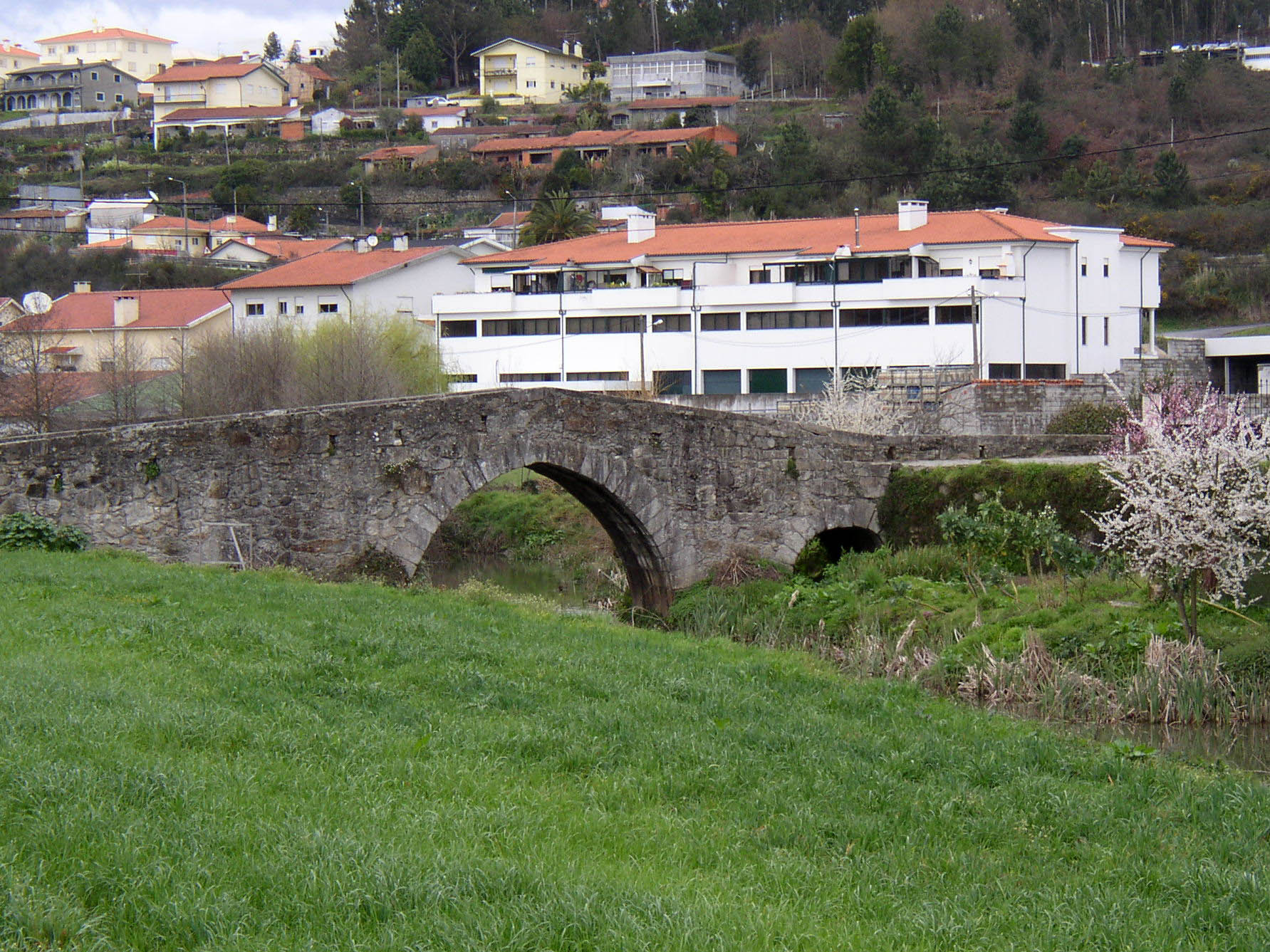

Ponte da Pica is a bridge in Portugal. It is located in Oliveira de Azeméis, Aveiro District.

== See also ==
- List of bridges in Portugal
