= Ponte do Rio Vade =

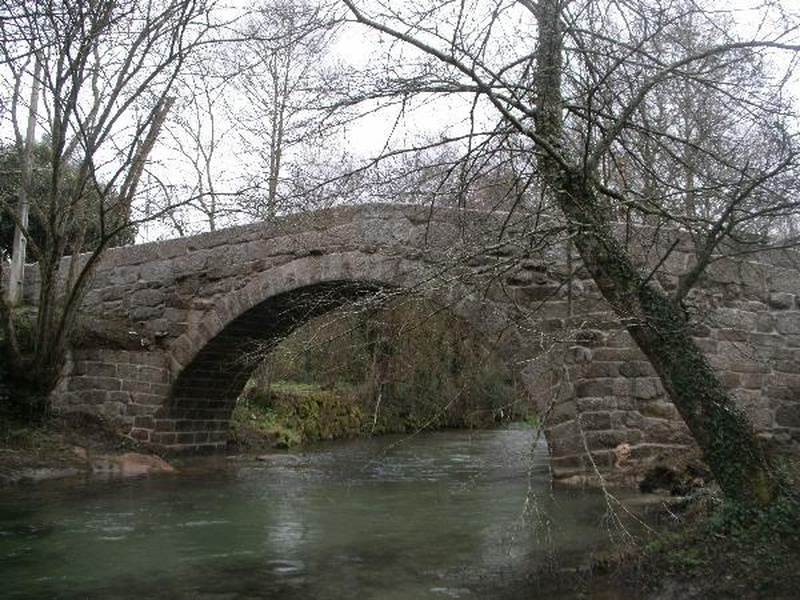
- Coordinates: 41°48′12″N 8°25′17″W
- Locale: Viana do Castelo District, Portugal

History
- Construction end: 18th century

Location
- Interactive map of Ponte do Rio Vade

Ponte do Rio Vade is a bridge in Portugal. It is located in Viana do Castelo District. It's classified as Properties of Public Interest in Portugal

It was originally a Roman bridge for communications and transport. It was repaired in the 18th century, as can be seen by irregularity in the masonry above the bridge's arch.

== See also ==
- List of bridges in Portugal
