= Ponte da Varela =

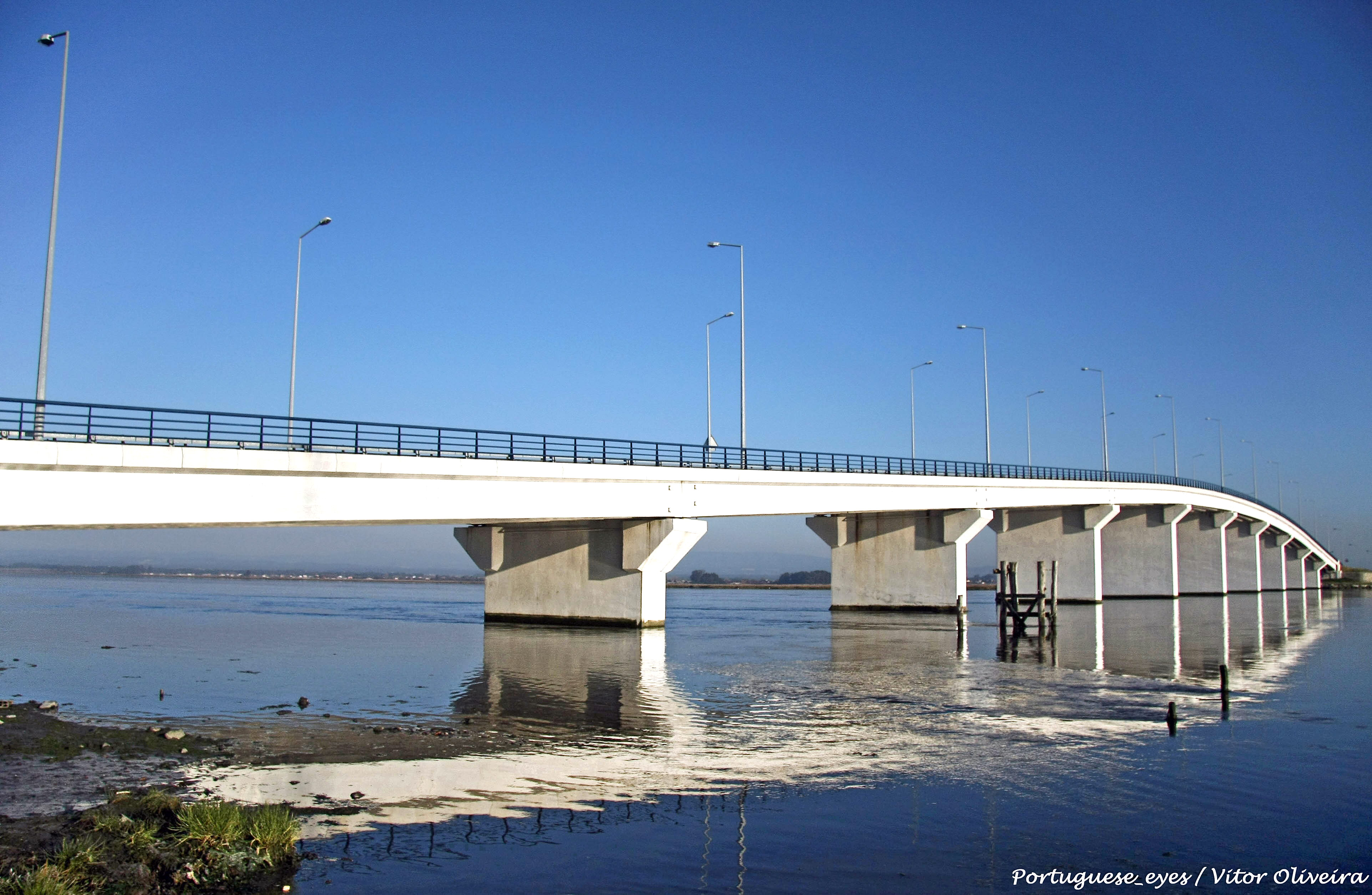
- Coordinates: 40°47′22″N 8°40′22″W
- Carries: 1 lane of vehicular and pedestrian traffic
- Locale: Aveiro District, Portugal

Ponte da Varela is a bridge in Aveiro District in Portugal. It was inaugurated on June 22, 1964, after a lengthy design phase. The bridge is constructed of concrete and steel, with the legs far enough apart to allow ships to pass beneath.

== See also ==
- List of bridges in Portugal
