= Rainha Santa Isabel Bridge =

- Coordinates: 40°11′33″N 8°25′25″W
- Carries: N17
- Crosses: Mondego River
- Locale: Coimbra, Portugal
- Official name: Ponte de Santa Isabel de Aragão, Rainha de Portugal
- Other name: Ponte Europa (Europe Bridge)
- Maintained by: Estradas de Portugal

Characteristics
- Design: Cable-stayed bridge with semi-fan system
- Total length: 329.4 m (1,080 ft)
- Width: 30 m (98 ft)
- Longest span: 186.5 m (611 ft)

History
- Designer: António José Luís dos Reis
- Constructed by: Bureau d'études Greisch
- Construction start: 1990
- Construction end: 2003
- Construction cost: € 59,300,000
- Opened: 2004; 22 years ago
- Inaugurated: May 2004

Location
- Interactive map of Rainha Santa Isabel Bridge

The Rainha Santa Isabel Bridge (Portuguese: Ponte Rainha Santa Isabel) is a cable-stayed bridge with semi-fan system completed in 2003 and opened in 2004, crossing the Mondego River. Although it had an initial estimated value of €38.65 million, it severely surpassed that to €59.3 million.

The construction of this bridge permitted a quicker access to the south of the city of Coimbra, namely to Pólo II section of the University of Coimbra. It carries N17 but connects to IC2. Construction was interrupted in October 2002 due to "alleged threat of collapse" During its construction it was known as Ponte Europa (Europe Bridge) which still holds as an alternate name, although not official.
