= Dona Antónia Ferreira Bridge =

Under construction bridge in Porto, Portugal

Dona Antónia Ferreira Bridge Ponte Dona Antónia Ferreira
- Coordinates: 41°08′47″N 8°38′07″W
- Carries: Porto Metro
- Crosses: Douro
- Locale: Porto–Vila Nova de Gaia, Portugal
- Other name: Ferreirinha Bridge

Characteristics
- Design: Arch bridge

History
- Opening: 2028

Location
- Interactive map of Dona Antónia Ferreira Bridge

The Dona Antónia Ferreira Bridge (Portuguese: Ponte Dona Antónia Ferreira), also known as the Ponte Ferreirinha, is an under-construction bridge and pedestrian zone that will connect Campo Alegre, in Porto, to Arrábida, in Vila Nova de Gaia. It will be integrated into the Porto Metro's Ruby Line and its completion is scheduled for April 2028.

The bridge will be 70 meters above the waterline and will have a main span of approximately 430 meters made of concrete.

== History ==
The name was chosen by vote and was in contention against 5 other names: "Ponte Douro", "Ponte da Boa Viagem", "Ponte Engenheiro Joaquim Sarmento", "Ponte da União" and "Ponte da Boa Passagem." The winning choice obtained 45% of the votes.
