= Ponte das Taipas =

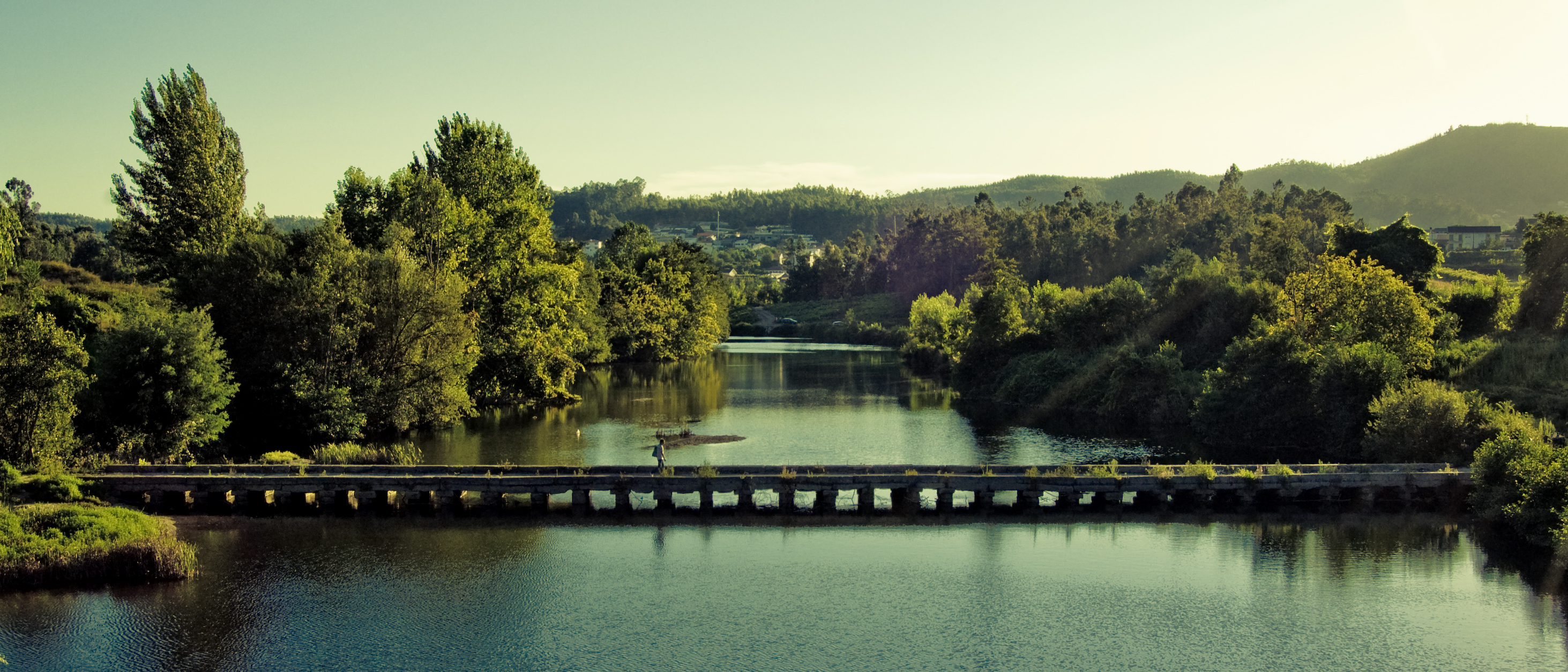
- Coordinates: 41.481947°N 8.344997°W
- Crosses: Ave River
- Locale: Caldas das Taipas, Guimarães, Portugal

Characteristics
- Design: Deck slab bridge

The Ponte das Taipas is a deck slab bridge across the Ave River in Caldas das Taipas, Portugal. Contrary to some sources which classify the structure as a Roman bridge, it was built in the modern age.
