= Los Varela =

Coordinates: 27°57′S 65°52′W

- Municipality and village
- Interactive map of Los Varela
- Country: Argentina
- Province: Catamarca Province
- Time zone: UTC−3 (ART)

Los Varela is a village and municipality in Catamarca Province in northwestern Argentina.
