= Cavez =

- Civil parish
- Location in Portugal
- Coordinates: 41.533°N 7.890°W
- Country: Portugal
- Region: Norte
- Intermunic. comm.: Ave
- District: Braga
- Municipality: Cabeceiras de Basto

Area
  - Total: 26.79 km^{2} (10.34 sq mi)

Population (2011)
  - Total: 1,268
  - Density: 47/km^{2} (120/sq mi)
- Time zone: UTC+00:00 (WET)
  - Summer (DST): UTC+01:00 (WEST)

Cavez is a civil parish in the municipality of Cabeceiras de Basto, Portugal. The population in 2011 was 1,268, in an area of 26.79 km^{2}.
