= Roge =

Roge Роге
- Village
- Location within Serbia
- Coordinates: 43°46′34″N 19°58′54″E
- Country: Serbia
- District: Zlatibor District
- Municipality: Požega

Area
  - Total: 16.5 km^{2} (6.4 sq mi)

Population (2022)
  - Total: 247
  - Density: 15.0/km^{2} (38.8/sq mi)
- Time zone: UTC+1 (CET)
  - Summer (DST): UTC+2 (CEST)

Roge is a village in the municipality of Požega, western Serbia. According to the 2022 census, the village has a population of 247 people.
