= Squalius aradensis =

Conservation status
- Vulnerable (IUCN 3.1)

Scientific classification
- Kingdom: Animalia
- Phylum: Chordata
- Class: Actinopterygii
- Division: Teleostei
- Order: Cypriniformes
- Family: Leuciscidae
- Subfamily: Leuciscinae
- Genus: Squalius
- Species: S. aradensis

Binomial name
- Squalius aradensis (Coelho, Bogutskaya, Rodrigues & Collares-Pereira, 1998)

Synonyms
- Leuciscus aradensis Coelho, Bogutskaya, Rodrigues & Collares-Pereira, 1998

Species of fish

Squalius aradensis, the Arade chub, is a species of freshwater ray-finned fish belonging to the family Leuciscidae, which includes the daces, Eurasian minnows and related fishes. This species is found in Portugal.

== Taxonomy ==
Squalius aradensis was first formally described as Leuciscus aradensis in 1998 by Maria Manuela Coelho, Nina Gidalevna Bogutskaya, José Armando Rodrigues and Maria João Collares-Pereira, with its type locality given as Arade River, Silves, in the Arade basin in Portugal. The Adana chub belongs to the genus Squalius, commonly referred to as chubs, which belongs to the subfamily Leuciscinae of the family Leuciscidae.

== Etymology ==
Squalius aradensis belongs to the genus Squalius. This name was proposed by the French biologist Charles Lucien Bonaparte in 1837 for a subgenus of the genus Leuciscus for the Italian chub (Squalius cephalus), inserting an additional "i" to prevent homonymy with the spurdog genus Squalus. In classical Latin, the chub and the spurdog were homonyms as squalus. An alternative explanation was that the name is a latinisation of squaglio, a vernacular name for the Italian chub in Rome and its environs. The specific name, aradensis, means "of Arade", referring to the type locality being in the Arade River.

== Description ==
Squalius aradensis has the dorsal fin supported by 3 spines and 8 soft rays, while the anal fin also has 3 spines, but has 7 or 8 soft rays. The body is fusiform in shape and the maximum standard length is 13.1 cm (5.2 in).

== Distribution and habitat ==
Squalius aradensis is endemic to southern Portugal, where it is known to occur in the Seixe, Aljezur, Carrapateira, Bordeira, Algibre, Bensafrim, Alvor, Arade and Quarteira drainage systems in the Algarve. The Arade chub is a species of small and medium-sized rivers which are subject to wide seasonal variations in flow, with fishes using isolated permanent pools as refuges in the dry months. They prefer gravel or substrate stream beds with some cover provided by roots, fallen wood and aquatic vegetation.
