= Alte River =

River of the Algarve, Portugal

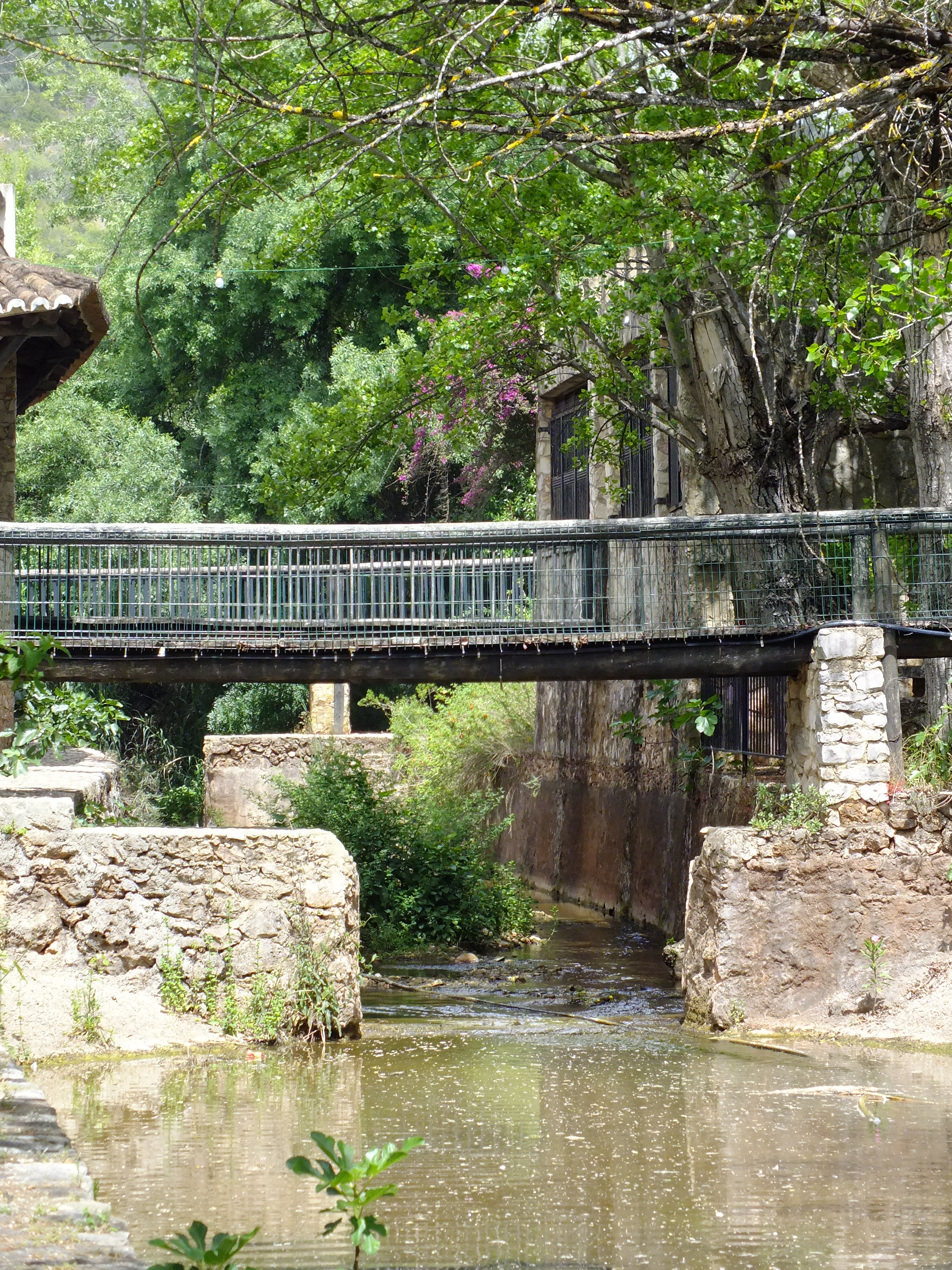
- Alte river within the village of Alte

- Confluence of the Alte River and the Quarteira River

Location
- Country: Portugal
- Region: Algarve
- District: Faro
- Municipality: Loulé

Physical characteristics
- Source
  - location: Alte, Algarve
  - coordinates: 37°14′17.7″N 8°09′57.6″W
- Source confluence
  - location: Quarteira River
  - coordinates: 37°10′51.5″N 8°12′28.1″W
  - elevation: 50 m (160 ft)
- Mouth: Into the Atlantic Ocean at Quarteira
- Length: 7.2 mi (11.6 km), North East to South West

The Alte River (Portuguese pronunciation: [ˈaltɨ]) is a small river in the Portuguese region of the Algarve. The river along with the Algibre River, another tributary, becomes the Quarteira River after the two rivers conflux. The source of the river is a short distance east of the village of Alte and it runs for a distance of 11.6 kilometres (7.2 mi) to its confluence with the Algibre River near the village of Paderne.

== Description ==
The Algibre is one of a number of small rivers in the central Algarve which make up the water ecosystem known as the Querença–Silves Aquifer System.

== Gallery ==
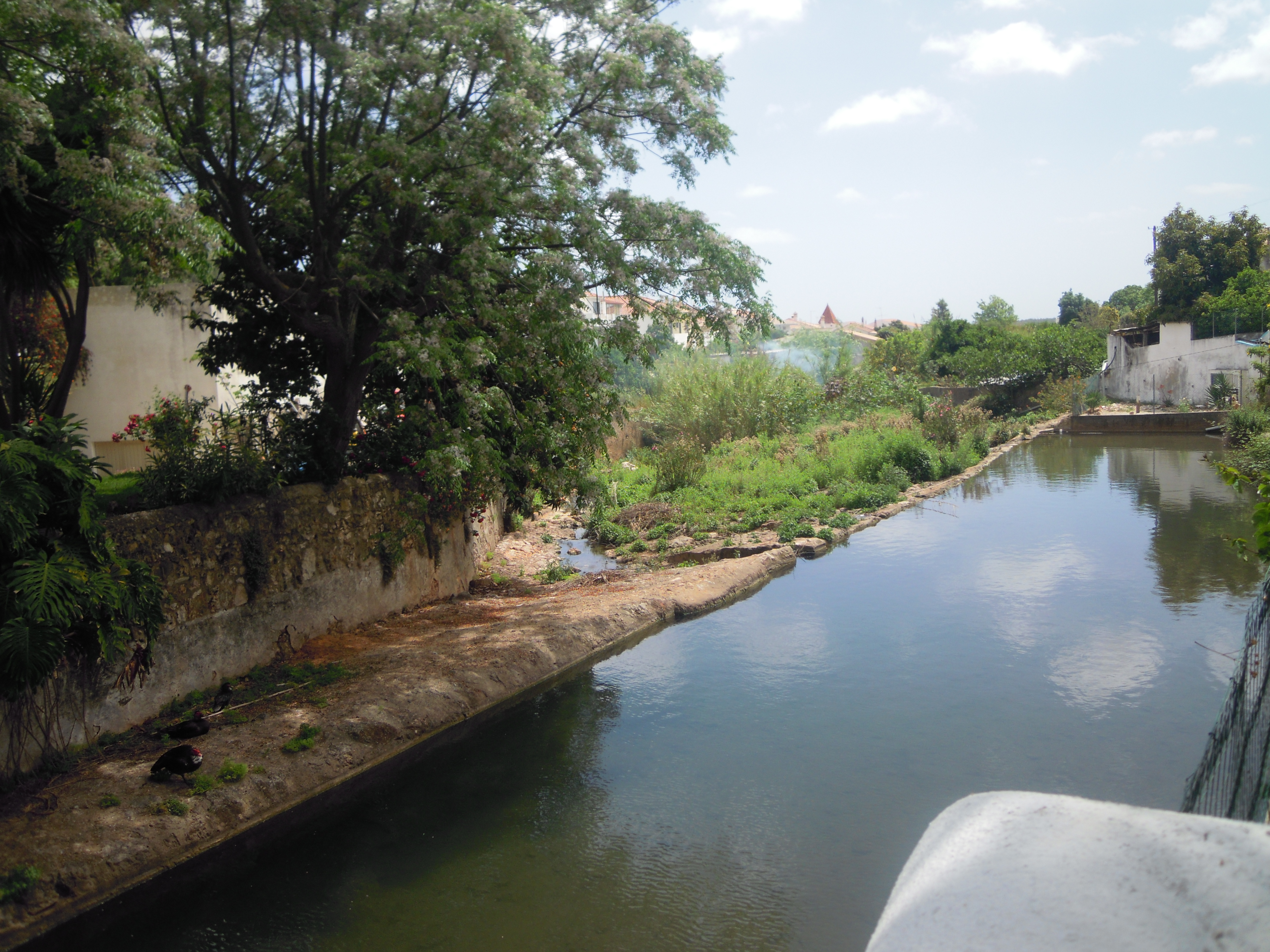

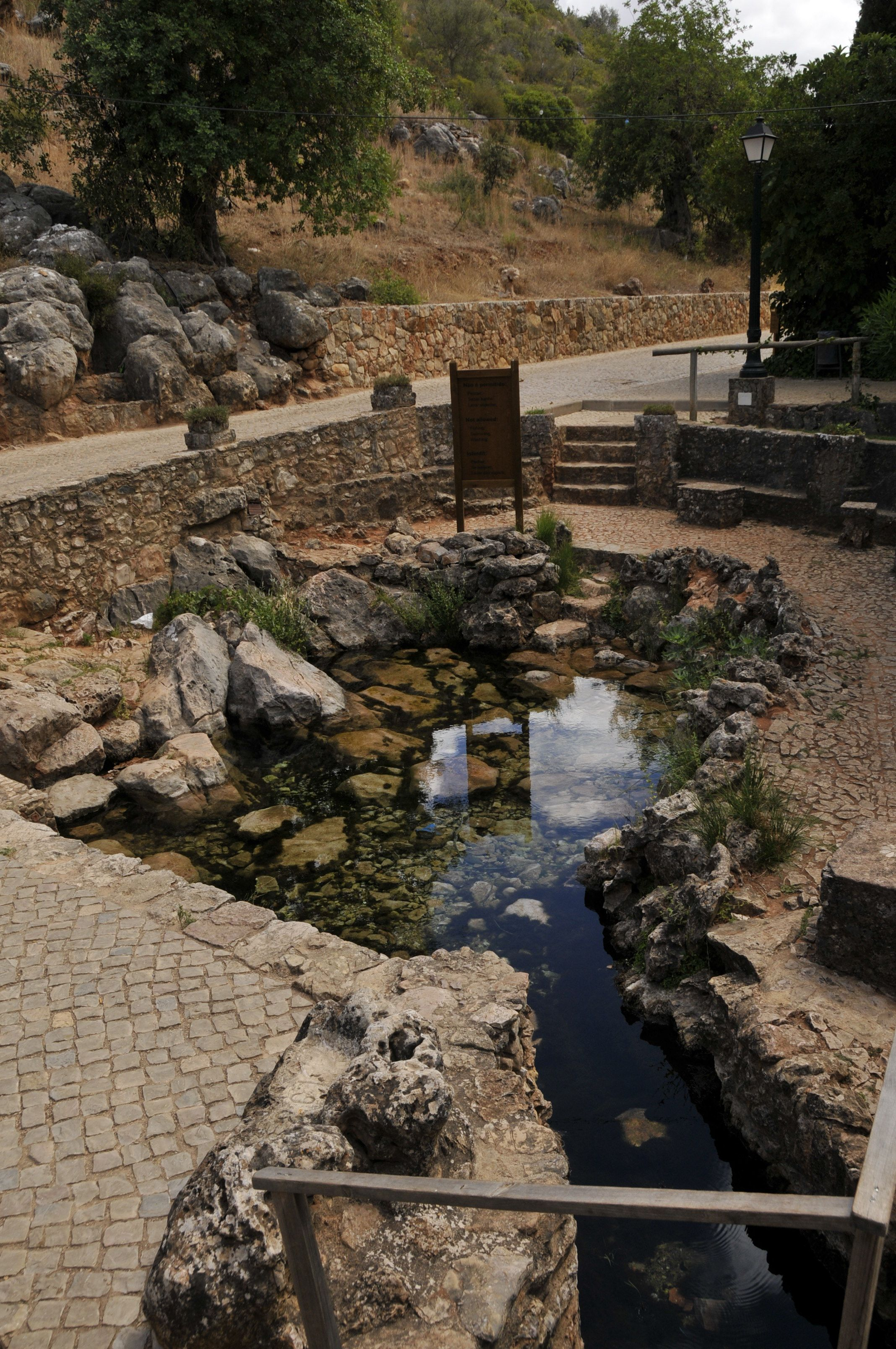
The source of the river close to the village of Alte

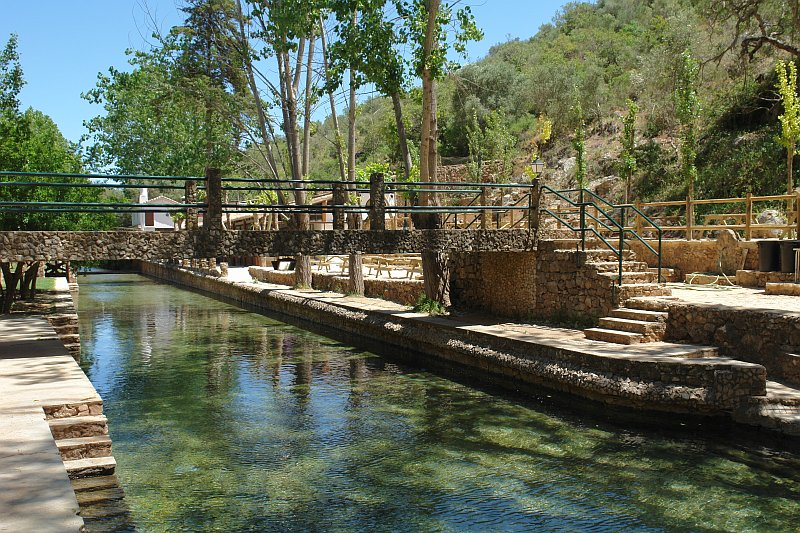
Bridge over the river within the village of Alte

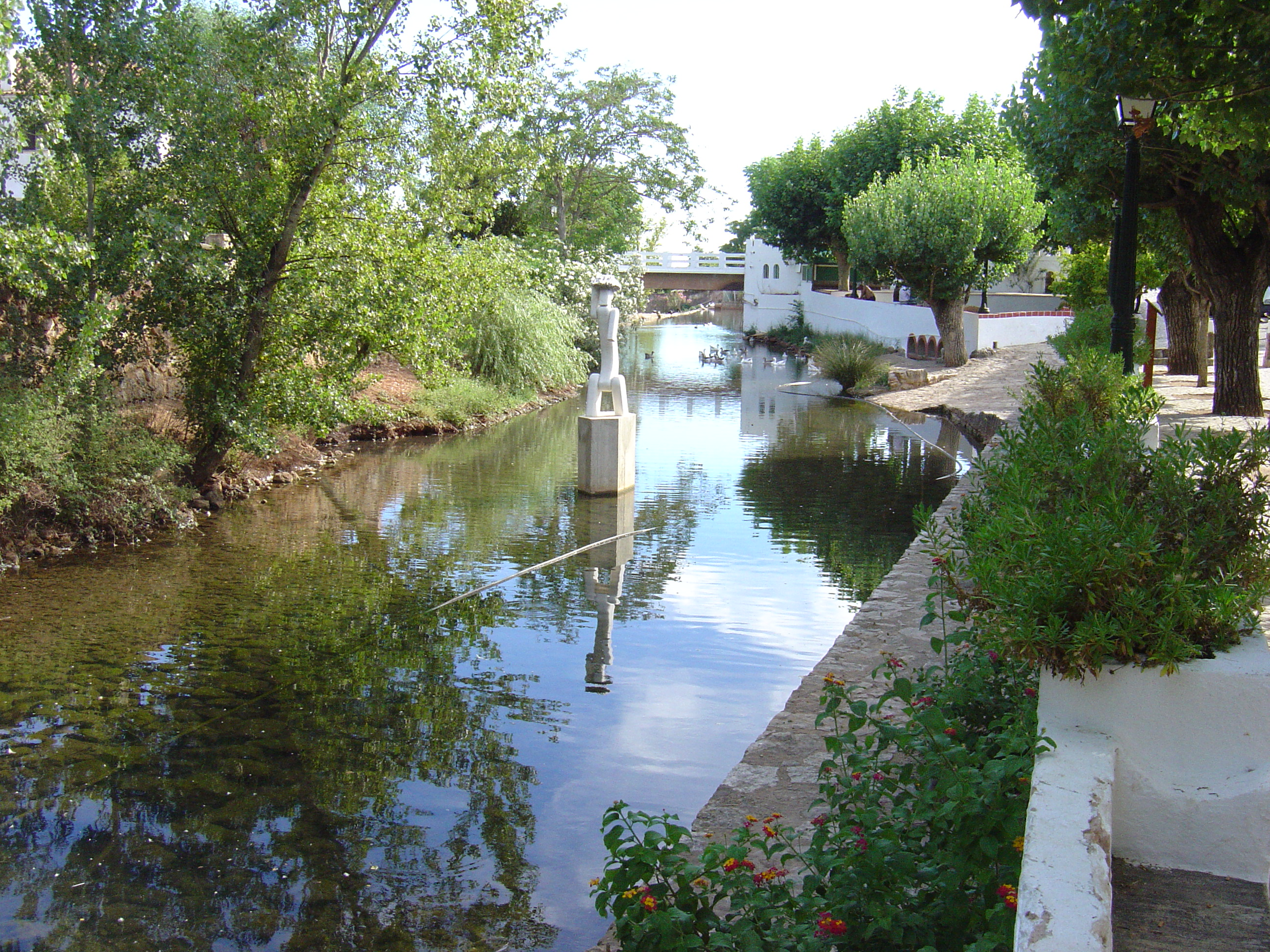

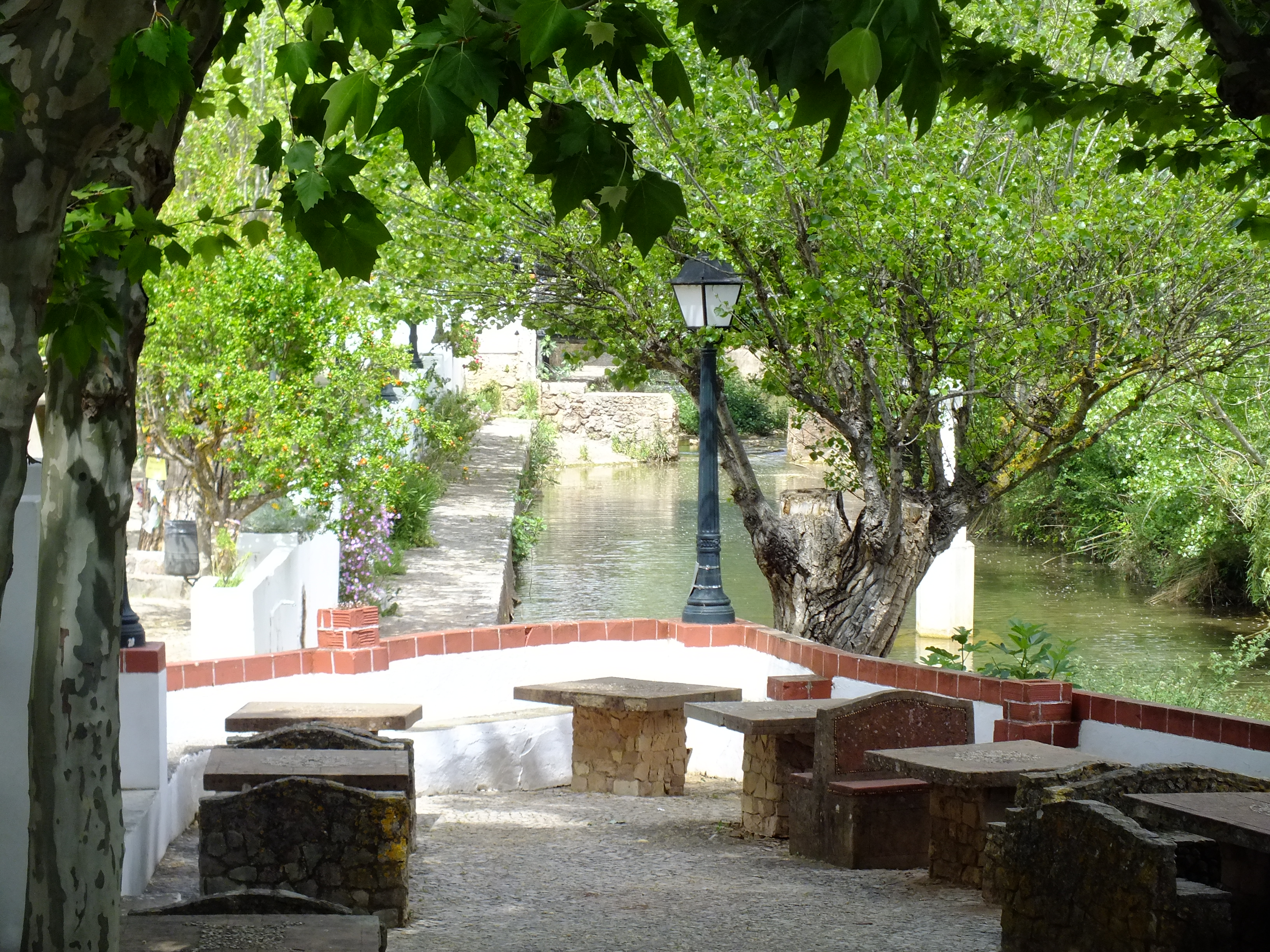

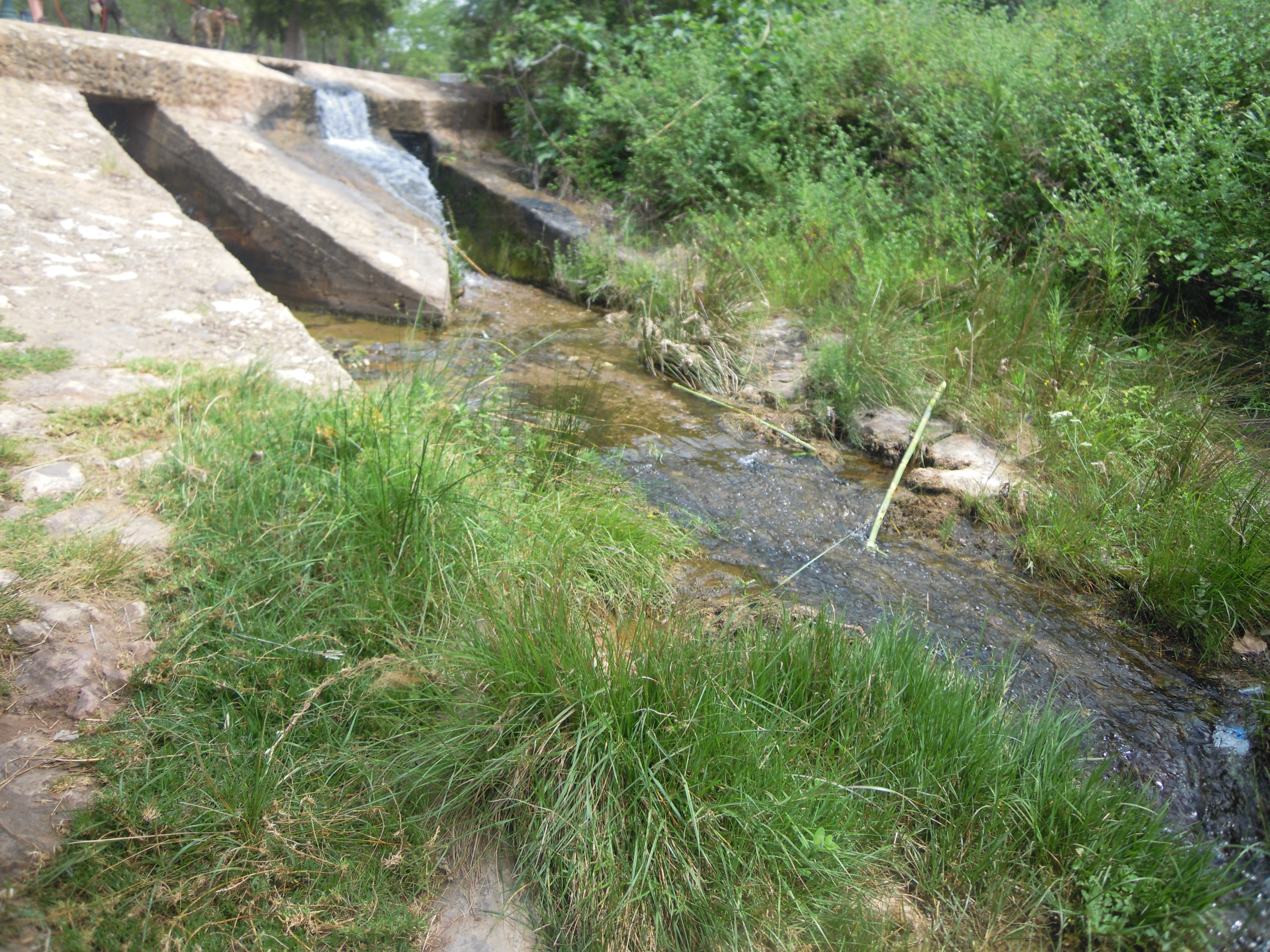
