= The Drifters (novel) =

Novel by James A. Michener

- First edition cover
- Author: James A. Michener
- Language: English
- Genre: Fiction
- Publisher: Random House
- Publication date: 1971
- Publication place: United States
- Media type: print
- Pages: 751pp.
- ISBN: 0-394-46200-9

The Drifters is a novel by Pulitzer Prize-winning author James A. Michener, published in 1971 by Random House. The novel follows six young characters from diverse backgrounds and various countries as their paths meet and they travel together through parts of Spain, Portugal, Morocco and Mozambique. The story is told from the perspective of the narrator, George Fairbanks, who is an investment analyst for the fictional company World Mutual Bank in Switzerland.

== Plot summary ==
Six young people make their way to Torremolinos, Spain. Joe is an American evading the Vietnam War draft. Britta leaves her native Norway to find warmth and sunshine. Monica, a Brit who grew up in Vwarda, Africa, is rebelling against familial control. American Cato is avoiding arrest for an activist demand for reparations that went wrong. Yigal is struggling with his upcoming decision to choose his citizenship: Israel, the United States, or the United Kingdom. Gretchen, having experienced abuse at the hands of law enforcement, flees Boston and her disapproving family. The six meet at a local bar, the Alamo, and form a congenial group. They are joined by George Fairbanks, a multinational conglomerate representative who has a history with Monica, Gretchen, and Yigal, when he arrives in Torremolinos to supervise a real estate deal,

Monica and Cato begin a torrid relationship. Britta and Joe pair off, to the dismay of Yigal who has a crush on Britta. Monica experiments with drugs and urges the others to participate. Hoping to separate Monica from her drug dealer, the group travels to Alte in Algarve , Portugal, where they mingle with the local residents. Monica finds a new dealer in nearby Albufeira and convinces Gretchen to try LSD, but Gretchen's experience is frightening. Monica heads to Nepal with some strangers, but Fairbanks, Joe, Yigal and Cato rescue her. The group heads off to Pamplona, Spain with Fairbanks.

In Pamplona, they meet an old friend of Fairbanks, Harvey Holt, who returns to Pamplona every year for the running of the bulls. Joe, Yigal, Cato, and Fairbanks decide to participate. Britta, whose relationship with Joe has ended, is attracted to Holt. Holt is injured by a bull. Yigal's grandfather from Detroit arrives and convinces Yigal to return to the United States with him. As the Pamplona celebrations come to an end, the remaining members of the group decide to head to Mozambique.

In Mozambique, Monica has moved beyond LSD, begins to use heroin regularly, starts to bring Cato down with her, and gets Joe to try heroin on occasion. Cato hangs around the local historians in the area, and begins to learn about the history of Africa, and the effect slavery has had on the continent. The group then decides to head to Marrakesh, Morocco, where there is a man who could help out Joe with some papers, so he could re-enter the United States at some point, and not be considered a criminal.

In Marrakesh, the group finds a place to stay at a hotel, where on the top floor there is a man who can help out Joe with his papers. Monica dies from an infection caused by her heroin use, Britta leaves with Holt, Cato begins a Hajj, Joe heads to Tokyo and Gretchen returns home to Boston.

== Reception ==
The book was a commercial success, ranking as one of the ten best-selling novels of 1971.

The New York Times book critic Thomas Lask found the novel superficial and lacking in character insight, stating that Michener "...is not investigating the states of mind of those suffering from existential anxiety, of those fundamentally alienated from the world. He is setting down the log of a number of people who think they may be able to solve some problems by postponing consideration of them...those interested in knowing how a sympathetic member of the older generation views some of the shenanigans of the younger will find The Drifters a tolerable interlude, especially as it is spiced with travelogue evocations of foreign climes."

A review in The Hartford Courant stated that "Overall, Michener has produced a fine work, a lively and entertaining examination of the New Society's would-be solutions to old society problems", while noting that "the drifters never launch into meaningless diatribes against society, as expatriates are wont to do...instead, they fly into carefully controlled rages, which at times seem highly unrealistic."
