= Castle of Paderne =

Castle in Albufeira, Algarve, Portugal

- Castelo de Paderne
- Faro, Algarve, Algarve in Portugal
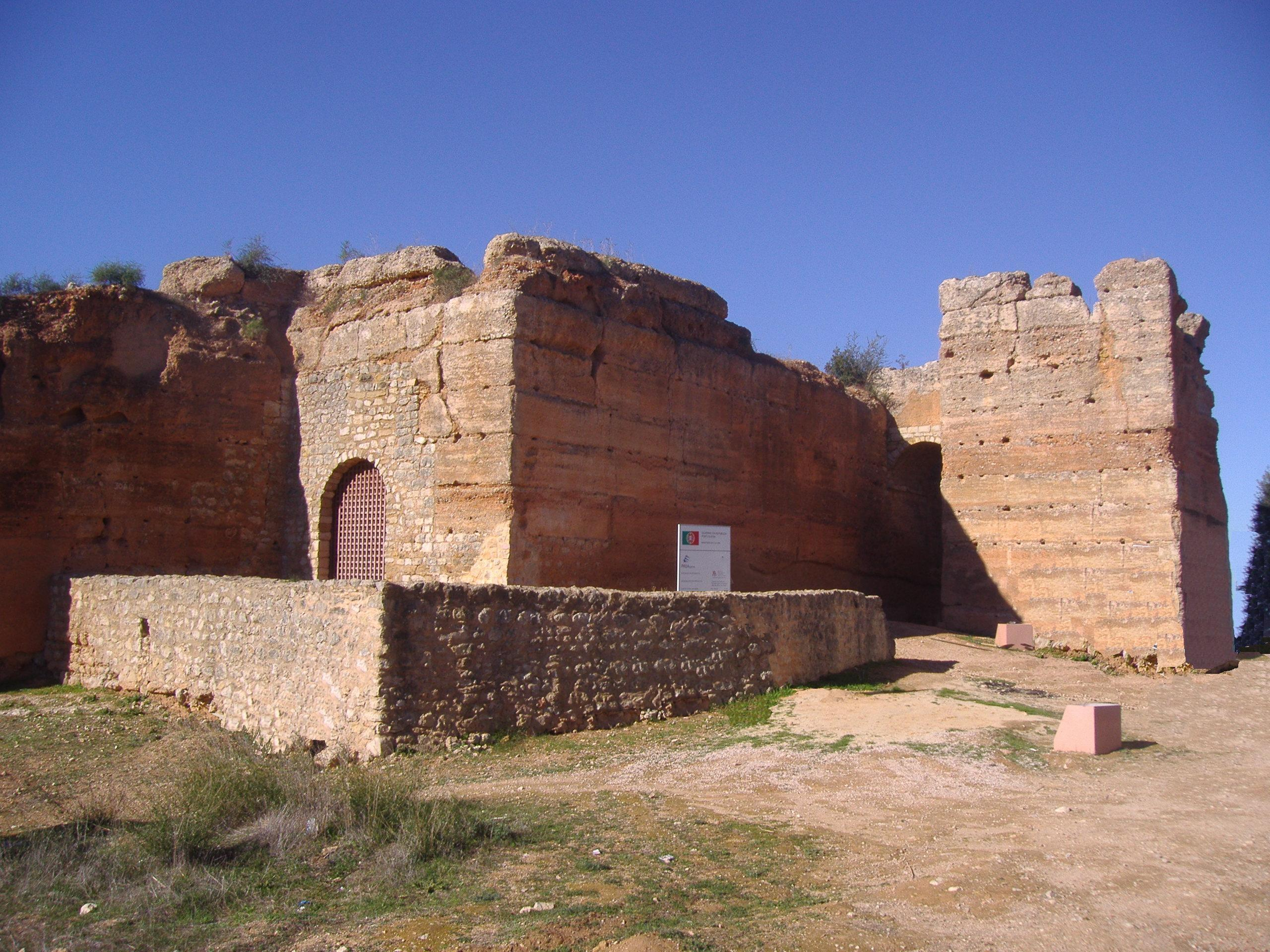
- A perspective of the tower gate, showing lateral wall and tower

Site information
- Type: Castle
- Owner: Portuguese Republic
- Operator: DRCALGARVE, Decree 34/2007, 29 March 2007
- Open to the public: Public

Location
- Coordinates: 37°09′25″N 8°12′02″W

Site history
- Built: 2nd Century
- Materials: Sandstone, Taipa

The Castle of Paderne (Portuguese: Castelo de Paderne) is an ancient fortification located in the civil parish of Paderne, municipality of Albufeira, in the Portuguese Algarve. It was constructed in the later 12th century by Berbers, in an area around 7.5 kilometres (4.7 mi) inland.

The edifice is located just 8.2 kilometres (5.1 mi) from the resort town of Albufeira, along a bend in the Quarteira River. It is believed to be one of the original castles that occupy the shield of the Portuguese national flag.

== History ==
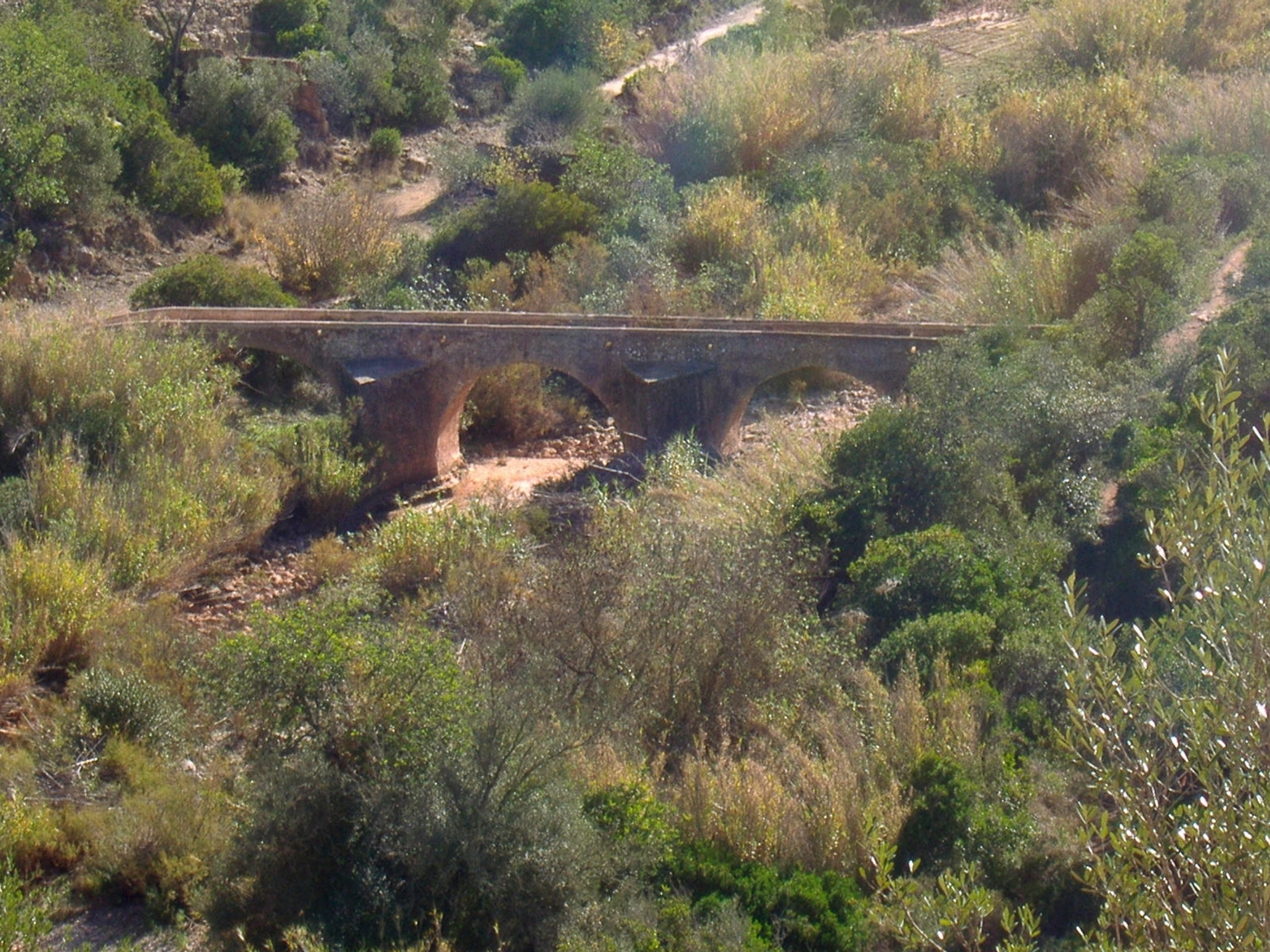
Bridge of Paderne (Ponte de Paderne), built in the Middle Ages and restored in 1771.

Almohad control of the Iberian Peninsula, Christian counterattacks from the North

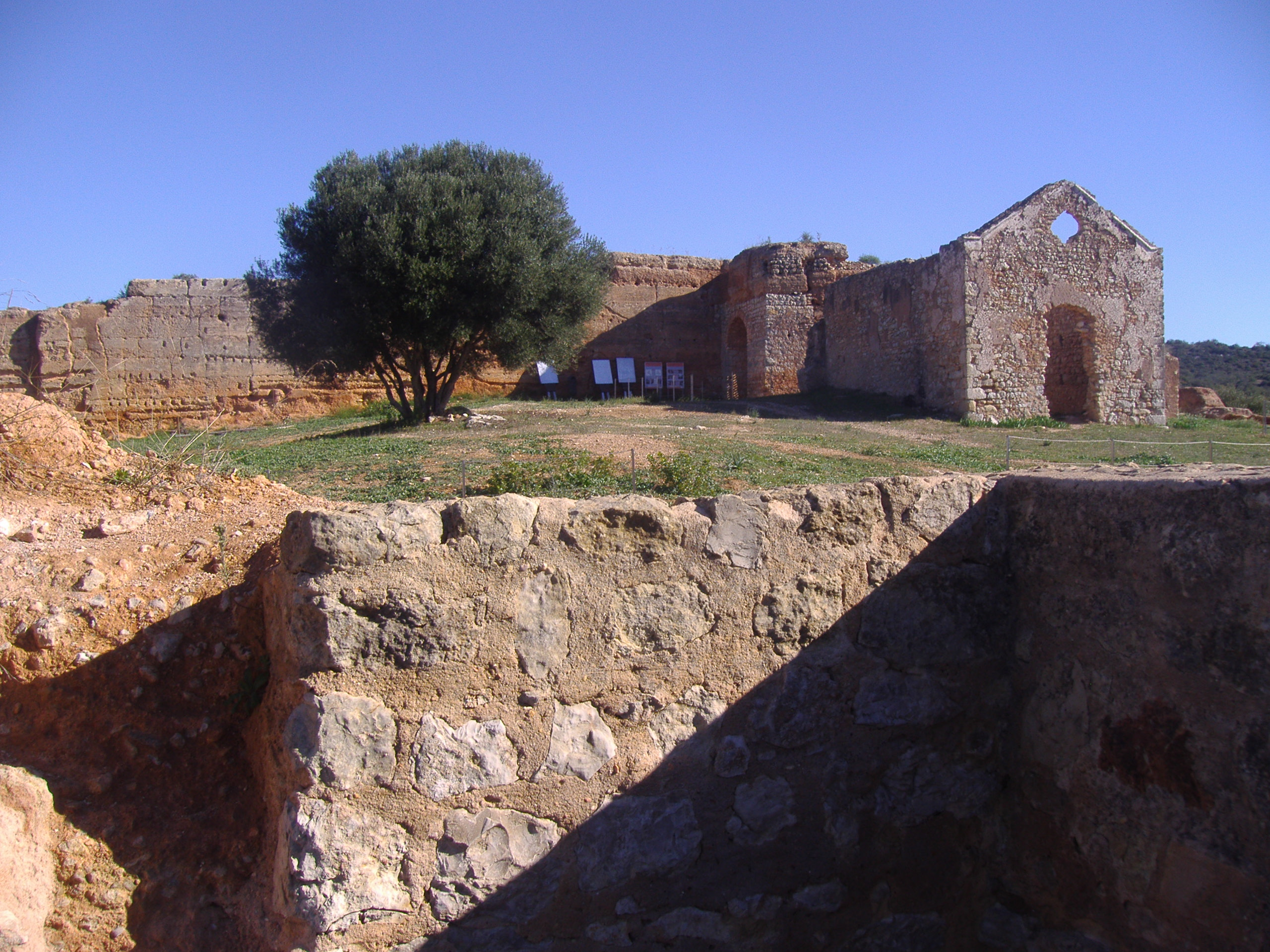
The ruined Chapel of Nossa Senhora do Castelo

Around the middle of the 2nd century, the Roman conquered the Lusitanian castro, which had developed between Neolithic and Cacholithic. The settlement was transformed into a military outpost and, eventually, politico-administrative centre named Paderne or Paderna. Its location on a rocky peninsular bend was of strategic importance, as it controlled the ancient Roman road Via Lusitanorum crossing the Quarteira River on the south.

The Roman villa was conquered by the Moors by 713. On this site, the Almohads constructed a fortification. Concerned with advancing Christian armies from the north, the Almohads began an intensive period of military construction and fortification in the Algarve (in Paderne, Faro, Loulé and Silves and many other locations). The depopulation of the Muslim countryside, caused by Christian raids, while avoiding outright conflict, resulted in the construction of these types of fortifications, which were used secure relative safety for their citizens in the interior of the Algarvean Barrocal (mountains).

In 1189, Paderne surrendered to King Sancho I after the conquest of Silves, undertaken with help from northern crusaders. In 1191 Muslim forces of the Almohad dynasty under the command of Caliph Abu Yusuf Ya’qub al-Mansur recaptured the castle and surrounding lands.

In 1248, D. Paio Peres Correia took the castle for the Crown of Portugal, during the reign of Afonso III. The forces of Peres Correia massacred all Muslim inhabitants within Paderne castle. It was shortly after these events that a chapel was built: likely on the ruins of a mosque.

Following a series of restorations, King Denis of Portugal donated the castle to the Master of the Order of Avis, D. Lourenço Anes, as an attempt to make it a viable military and economic centre. But these attempts were tentative and, nonetheless, futile.

Owing to its isolation and state of ruin, in 1858, the castle was abandoned and its hermitage (local parish church, dedicated to Nossa Senhora da Assunção) was deactivated.

On 10 March 1998, the fort and dependencies were transferred to Instituto Português do Património Arquitectónico (IPPAR), the Portuguese Institute of Architectural Patrimony. The IPPAR contracted the company Terracarta in order to create a three-dimensional design of the property. Further, the monument and terrains were purchased by the institute for 29.000.000$00 escudos.

A public tender was issued on 29 January 2002, under PROAlgarve, for the Recuperation of the Castle of Paderne, under the auspices of the IPPAR. The candidate entity was responsible for the recuperation of the walls, in taipa, the archaeological study and museological assessment of the site, including the old dependencies within the courtyard, the drainage of the monument, and lastly, the consolidation of the ruins of the Hermitage of Nossa Senhora da Assunção. Archaeological excavations completed at the time unearthed remnants of dwellings and roadways within the castle compound, as well as the remains of a sophisticated sewage system and vestiges of a water supply network (that included cisterns and water channels).

== Architecture ==
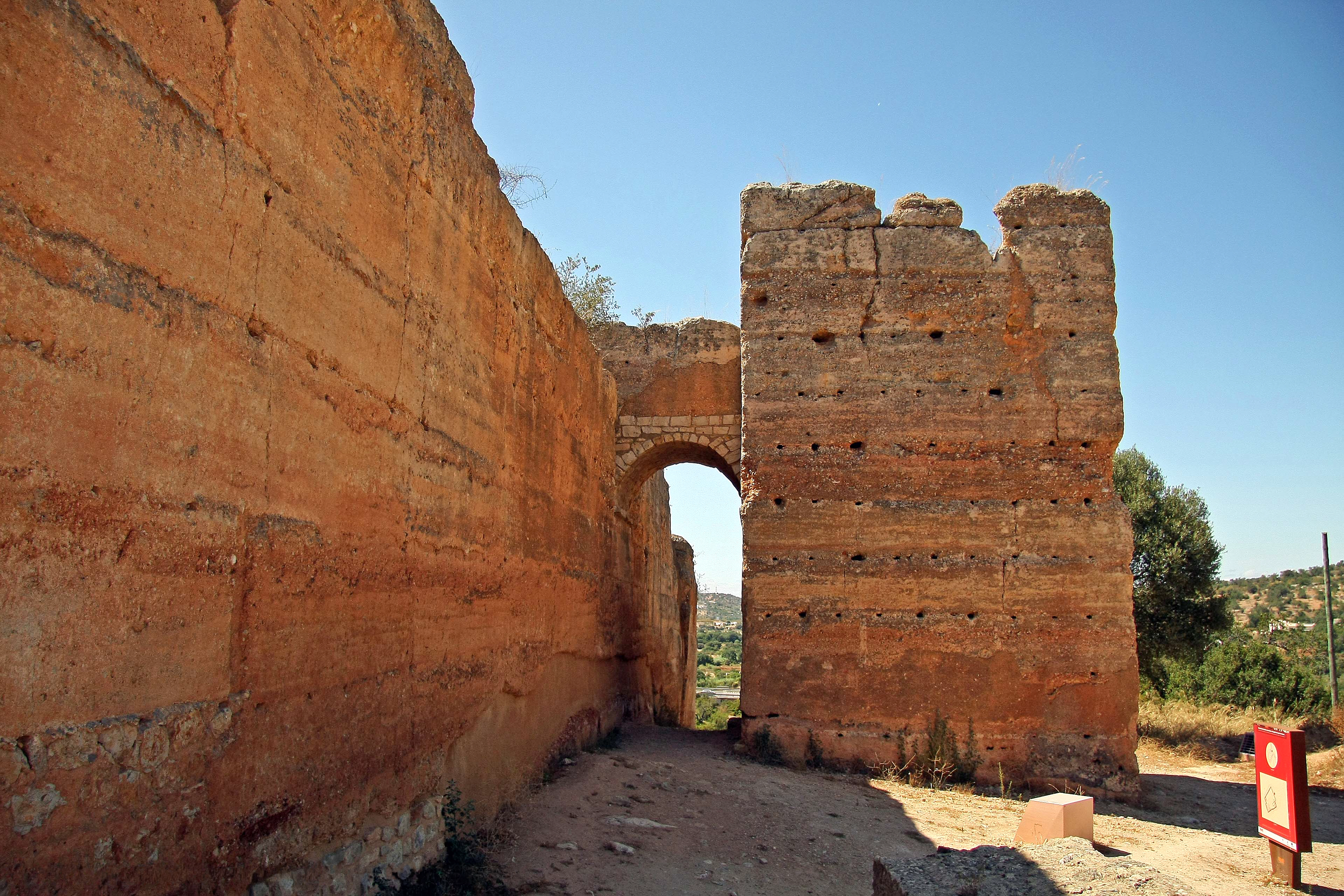
The tower/gate connected by walkway

The rural, isolated castle is located on a high hilltop over a profound valley, covered in Mediterranean vegetation, olive groves, fig and carob trees. Its lies in a zone classified under the Natura 2000 designation, with a pedestrian trail under the Instituto de Conservação da Natureza (Institute for the Conservation of Nature).

The castle is a regular trapezoidal plan, almost a hectare in size, surrounded by walls, with a road that links to a tower across a Roman arch bridge. Within the interior are vestiges of a longitudinal chapel, with only the walls remaining.

The eastern side, which has the least natural defence has a substantial tower and is built of Taipa (mixture of mud, chalk, lime and aggregate that sets like concrete). This tower, the only one standing within the enclosure, protrudes from the wall and is connected to the main fortification by an upper passageway. From the outside of this tower is still possible to make out the whitewash strips which were applied to the taipa joints in order to give the impression that the tower was built from masonry. Nevertheless, these mud walls are 1.8 metres (5.9 ft) thick and are constructed on a substantial stone plinth which can be seen at the base of the perimeter walls. There are also at intervals, vertical openings to allow for drainage of any accumulative water inside the castle walls.

Below the tower are the remains of ramparts, which ran across the eastern perimeter: most of it has collapsed. This battlement, which is lower than the main walls also defended the main access to the castle. The accessway is at a right angle to the main wall, creating an L-shaped entrance designed to make any frontal attack difficult. Not all the stonework in the entrance is original; much of the access was reinforced and restored over time.

Within the castle precinct are the remnants of a cistern.

Along the south wall are the ruins of the former Chapel of Nossa Senhora do Castelo, which was the parochial church for the nearby village, dating from the 14th century, but abandoned in 1506 (when the new church was constructed in the village).

== Gallery ==
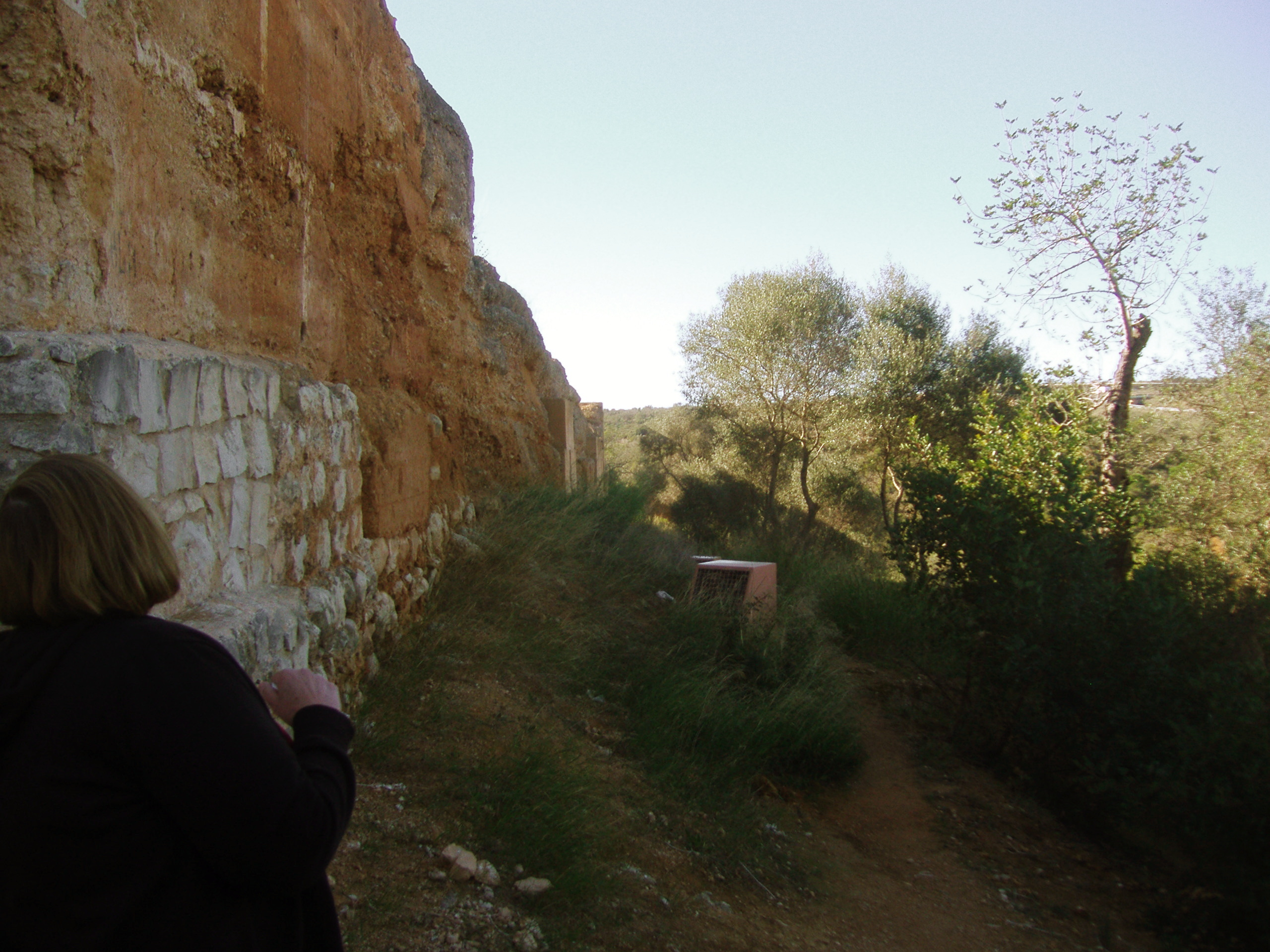
North wall

South wall

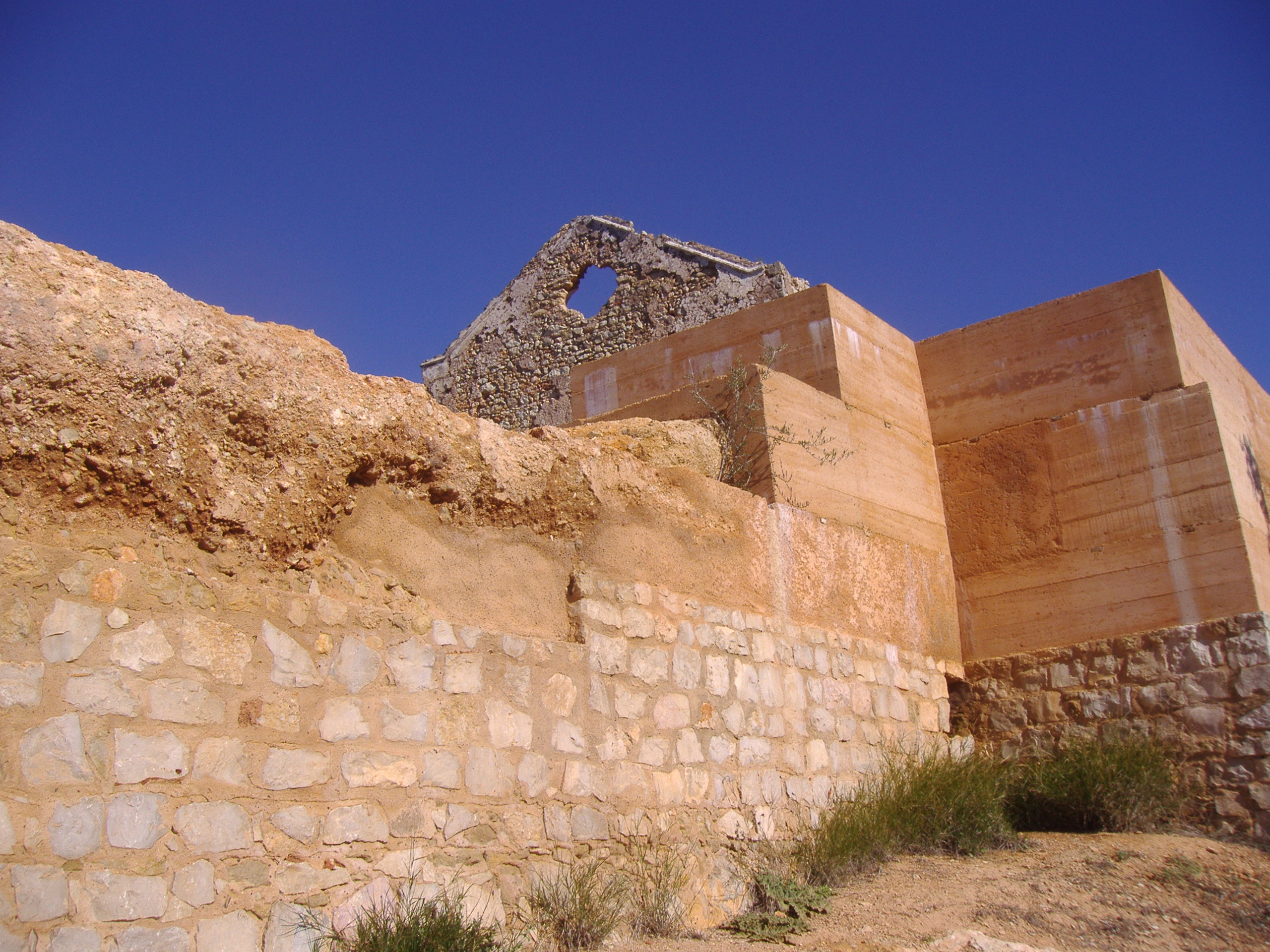
South wall and plinth

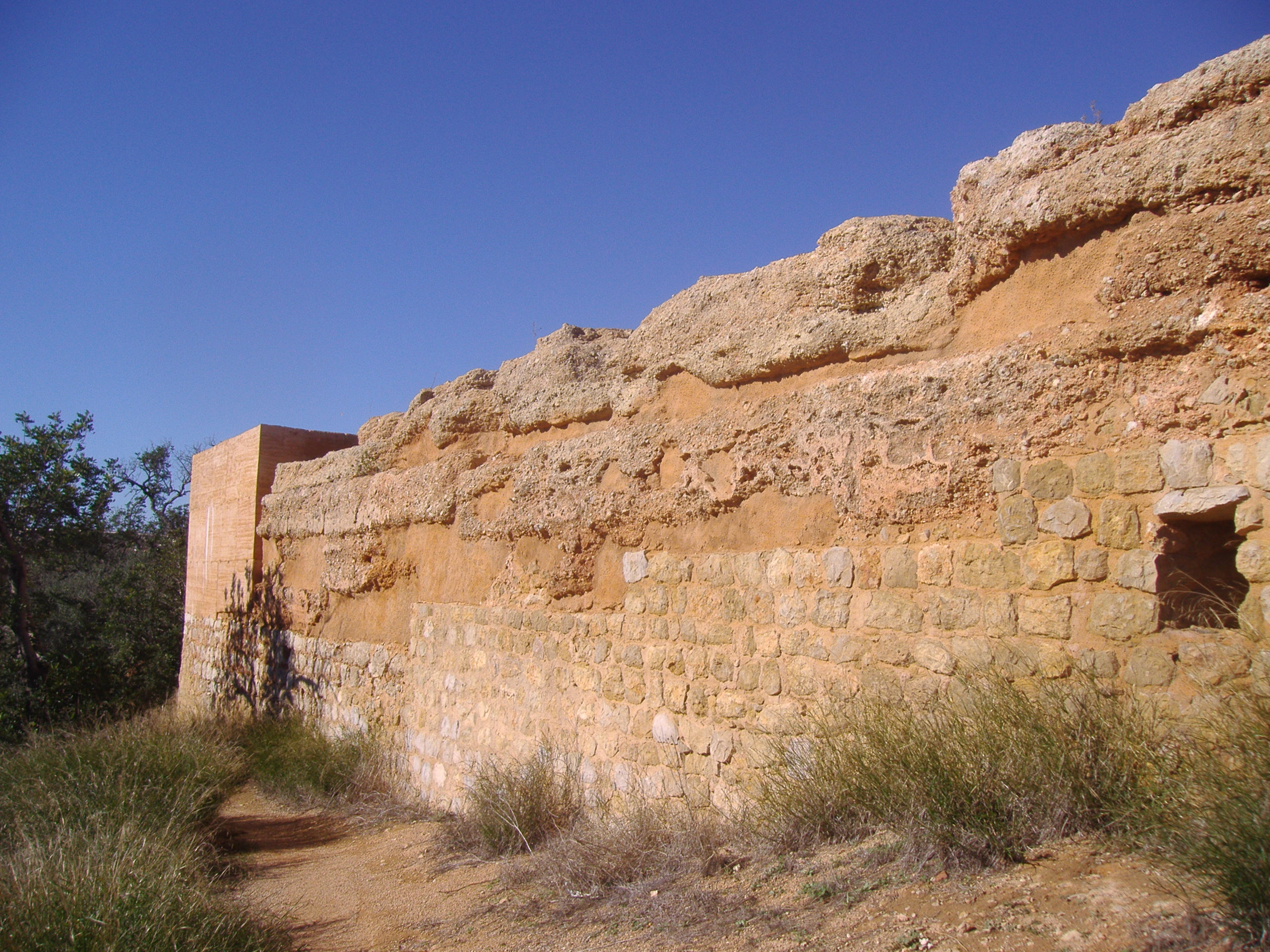
Southwest corner

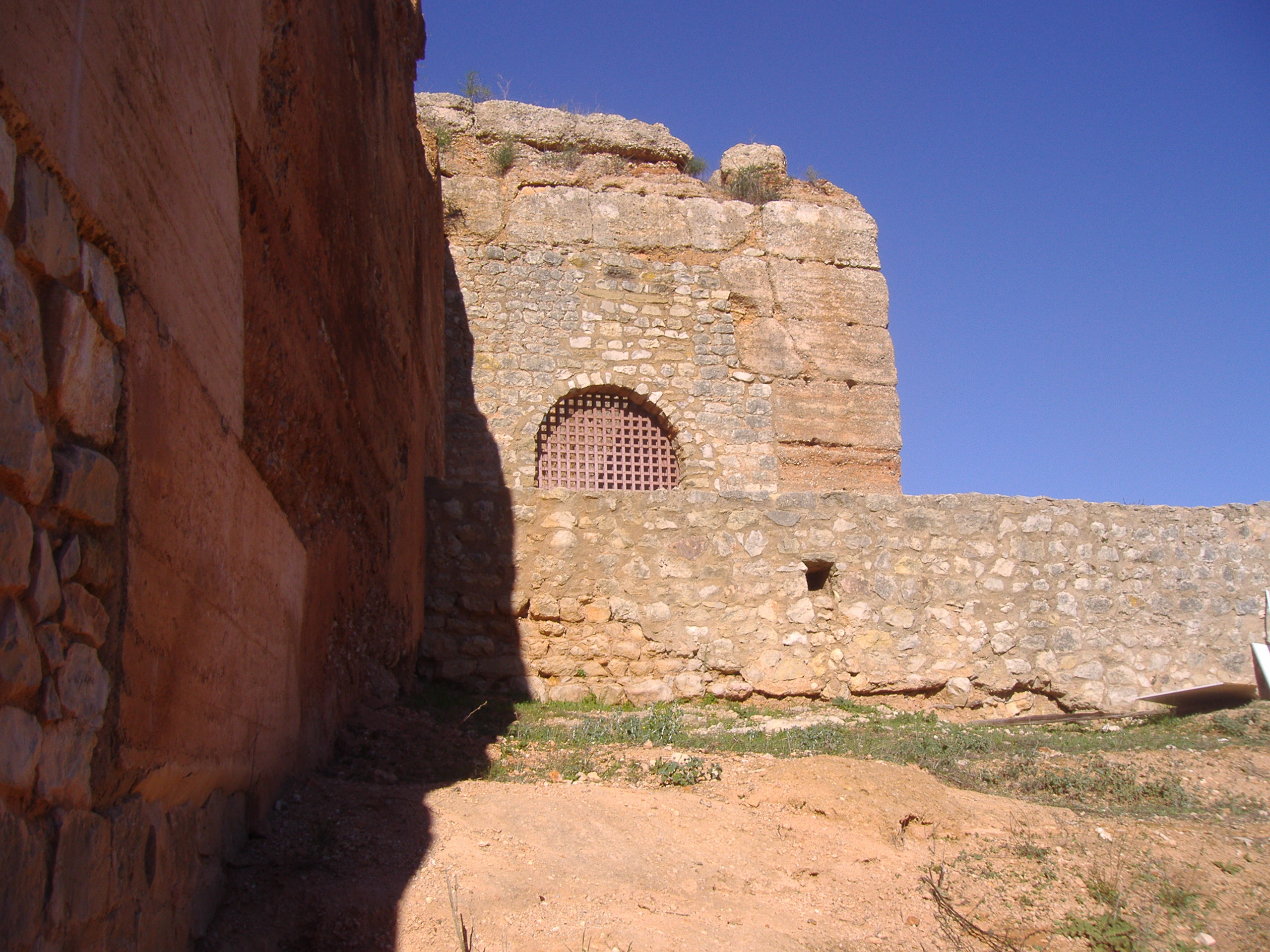
The entrance gate
