= Algibre River =

River of the Algarve, Portugal

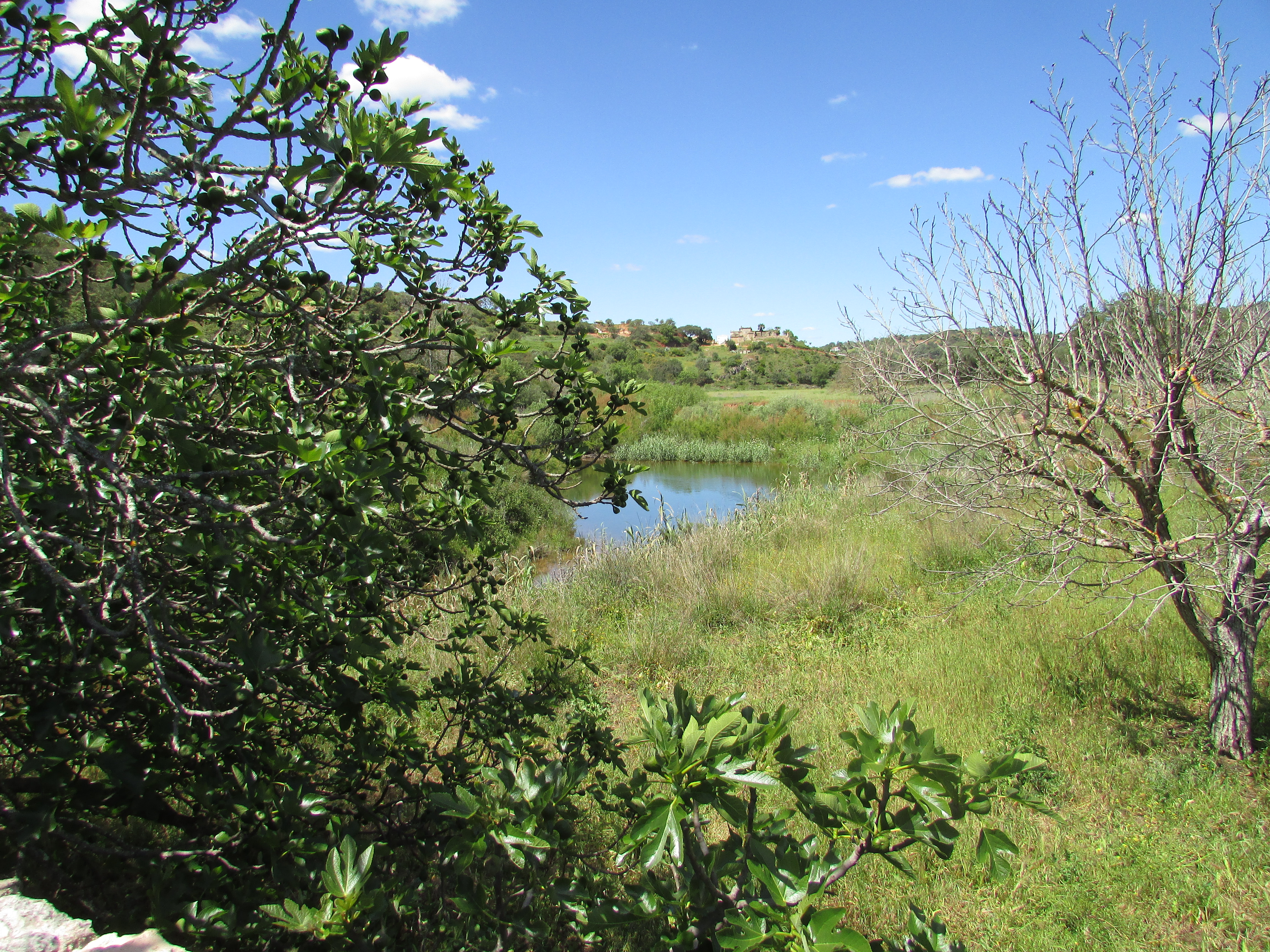
- The start of the Algibre River at confluence of the Mercês and Benémola rivers

- Confluence of the Algibre River and the Quarteira River

Location
- Country: Portugal
- Region: Algarve
- District: Faro
- Municipality: Loulé

Physical characteristics
- Source: Moinhos River
  - location: Querença, Algarve
  - coordinates: 37°11′29.9″N 8°00′26.2″W
  - elevation: 200 m (660 ft)
- 2nd source: Mercês River
  - location: Querença
  - coordinates: 37°11′29.9″N 8°00′26.2″W
  - elevation: 200 m (660 ft)
- 3rd source: Quarteira River
  - elevation: 50 m (160 ft)
- Mouth: Into the Atlantic Ocean at Quarteira
- Length: 13.5 mi (21.7 km), East to West

The Algibre River (Portuguese pronunciation: [alˈʒiβɾɨ]) is a small river in the Portuguese region of the Algarve. The Algibre River is formed by the confluence of the Mercês (Ribeira das Mercês) and Benémola (Ribeira da Benémola) rivers close to the village of Querença in a small fertile valley. The area is characterized by many derelict sluices and dams that date back to the period of Arab occupation, during which the whole area was irrigated and agriculture was the predominating activity of this land. The river along with the Alte River, another tributary, becomes the River Quarteira after the two rivers conflux. The river runs eastwards for 21.7 kilometres (13.5 mi) from its start at the confluence of.

== Description ==
The Algibre is one of a number of small rivers in the central Algarve that make up the water ecosystem known as the Querença – Silves Aquifer System.

== Gallery ==
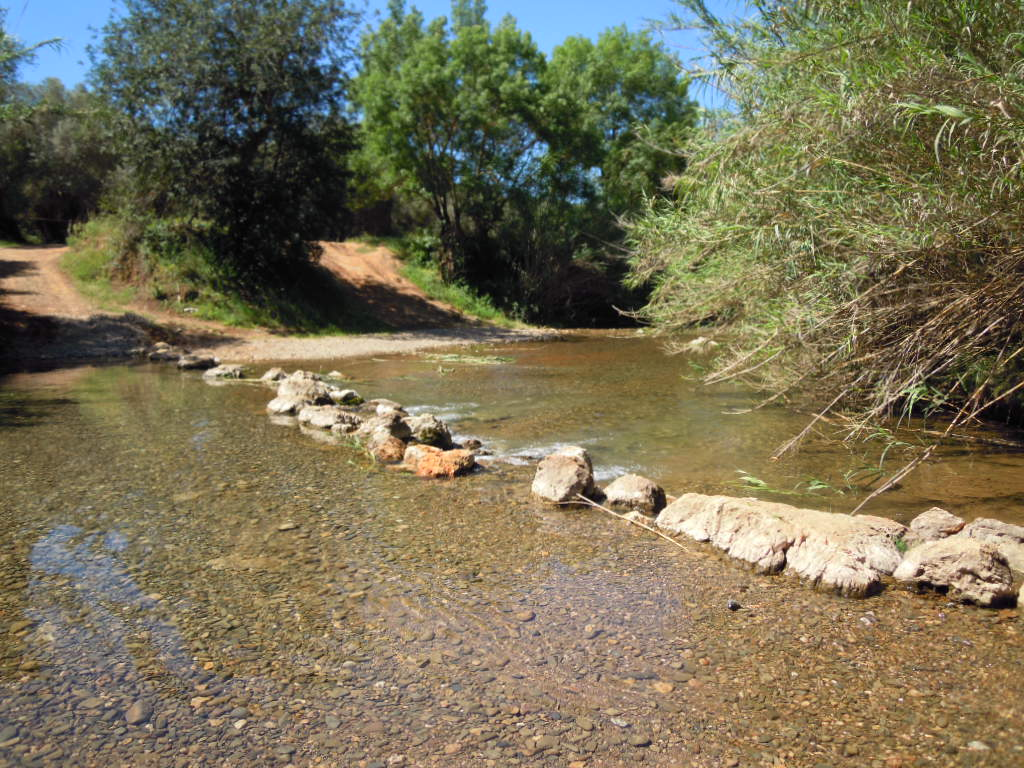
Stepping stone crossing next to a fording point on the river

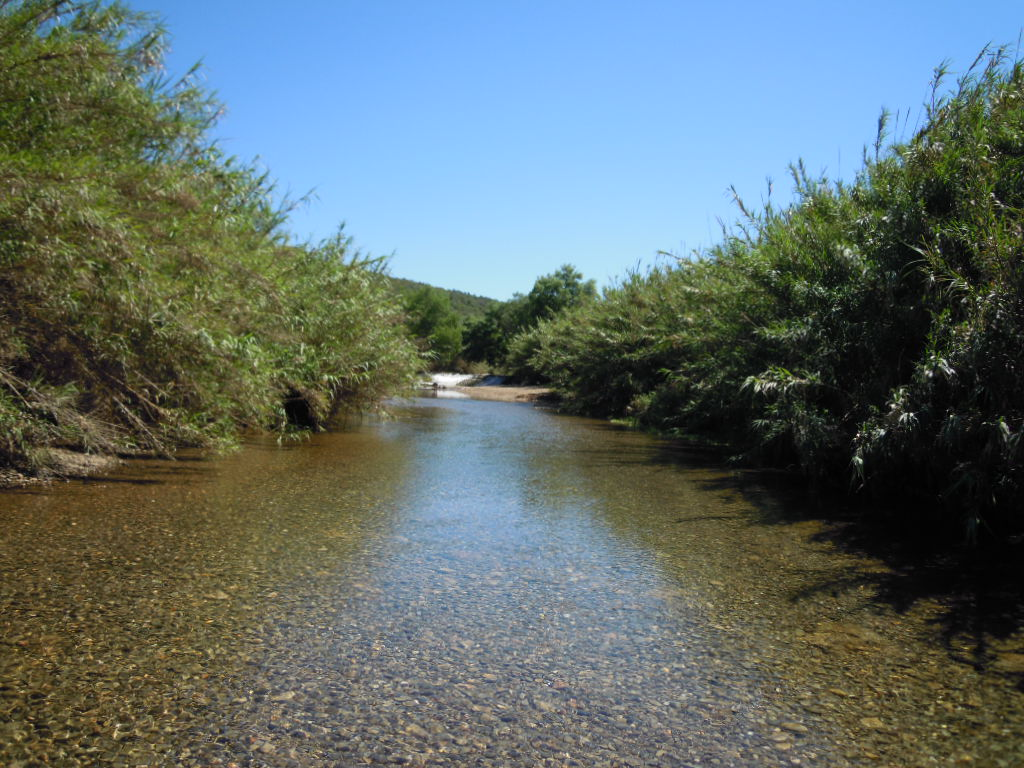
Clear water of the river in the springtime
