= Querença, Tôr e Benafim =

- Civil parish
- Location in Portugal
- Coordinates: 37.20°N 7.99°W
- Country: Portugal
- Region: Algarve
- Intermunic. comm.: Algarve
- District: Faro
- Municipality: Loulé

Area
  - Total: 102.18 km^{2} (39.45 sq mi)

Population (2011)
  - Total: 2,713
  - Density: 26.55/km^{2} (68.77/sq mi)
- Time zone: UTC+00:00 (WET)
  - Summer (DST): UTC+01:00 (WEST)

Querença, Tôr e Benafim is a civil parish in the municipality of Loulé, Portugal. It was formed in 2013 by the merger of the former parishes Querença, Tôr and Benafim. The population in 2011 was 2,713, in an area of 102.18 km².
