= Padernense Clube =

Portuguese sports club

Padernense
- Full name: Padernense Clube
- Founded: 1 December 1933
- Ground: Estádio João Campos, Paderne
- Capacity: 600
- League: AF Algarve Division Two
- 2020–21: cancelled (COVID)

Padernense Clube is a Portuguese sports club from Paderne, Albufeira.

The men's football team plays in the Algarve Football Association Division Two. The team had a short stint on the third tier when contesting the 2001–02 Segunda Divisão B, but was relegated. This year the team also reached the second round of the Taça de Portugal. After that, they were instantly relegated from the 2002–03 Terceira Divisão as well. Between 2011 and 2013, no team was fielded at all.
