= Alte =

- Civil parish
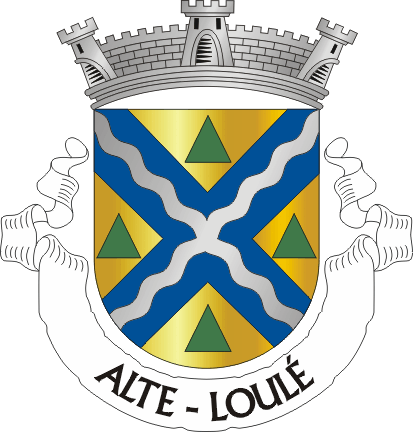
- Coat of arms

- Location in Portugal
- Coordinates: 37.236°N 8.176°W
- Country: Portugal
- Region: Algarve
- Intermunic. comm.: Algarve
- District: Faro
- Municipality: Loulé

Area
  - Total: 94.33 km^{2} (36.42 sq mi)

Population (2011)
  - Total: 1,997
  - Density: 21.17/km^{2} (54.83/sq mi)
- Time zone: UTC+00:00 (WET)
  - Summer (DST): UTC+01:00 (WEST)

Alte is a village and civil parish in the municipality of Loulé, in the Algarve region in the south of Portugal. The population in 2011 was 1,997, in an area of 94.33 square kilometres (36.42 sq mi).

Situated away from the coast, Alte is known as one of the most typical and unspoilt villages in the region of the Algarve. The village contains Algarve style whitewashed houses, traditional chimneys, and cobbled alleys. The Portuguese poet Cândido Guerreiro was born in Alte, in 1871.

== Church of Our Lady of the Assumption ==
The Mother Church of Alte or Church of Our Lady of the Assumption is located at the centre of the village of Alte on Largo da Igreja. The first church built here was constructed in the 13th century but this church was rebuilt at the start of the 16th century. The architecture of the church is in the Manueline style. The main west facing façade has a fine doorway with carved stone architraves. Through this door is the Nave. The chancel is decorated with 18th century tiles. There are important works of art in the church which include the Baroque altarpiece in the Chapel of Nossa Senhora do Carmo (Our Lady of Carmel), and the altarpieces on the side altars which are in the Rococo style. There is also a fine collection of statues, including an ivory statue of Our Lady of Santa Margarida (St Margaret), of Nossa Senhora do Carmo (Our Lady of Carmel) and of the dead Christ, all dating from the 18th century. There is also a small museum where there are two Mannerist pictures and a number of 17th century statues.

== Cândido Guerreiro ==
The Portuguese poet Cândido Guerreiro was born in a house located on Rua Poeta Cândido Guerreiro, Alte on the 3 December 1871. His full name was Francisco Xavier Cândido Guerreiro He was a post-symbolist poet, playwright and a Lawyer. He graduated in Law from the University of Coimbra in 1907. He practiced as a notary in Loulé and in Faro. He also became president of the Municipalities of Loulé and Faro in the period between 1923 and 1941. As a poet he became part of the group known as the Portuguese Renaissance. He Died on the 11 April 1953 in Lisbon.. At Fonte Pequena (see photo below), a set of azulejo panels displays a portrait of Guerreiro, probably Alte's most celebrated son, together with some of his poems, the most emblematic of which goes like this:

Porque nasci ao pé de quatro montes

Por onde as águas passam a cantar
As canções dos moinhos e das fontes,
Ensinaram-me as águas a falar.

(As the place where I was born lies encircled by four hills
Through which waters run singing
The songs of fountains and mills,

Waters taught me to speak.)

— Cândido Guerreiro

In James A. Michener's novel The Drifters, Alte serves as the main setting of the chapter Algarve, being recommended to the protagonists by a customs officer who wants them "to know Portugal at its best."

== Gallery ==
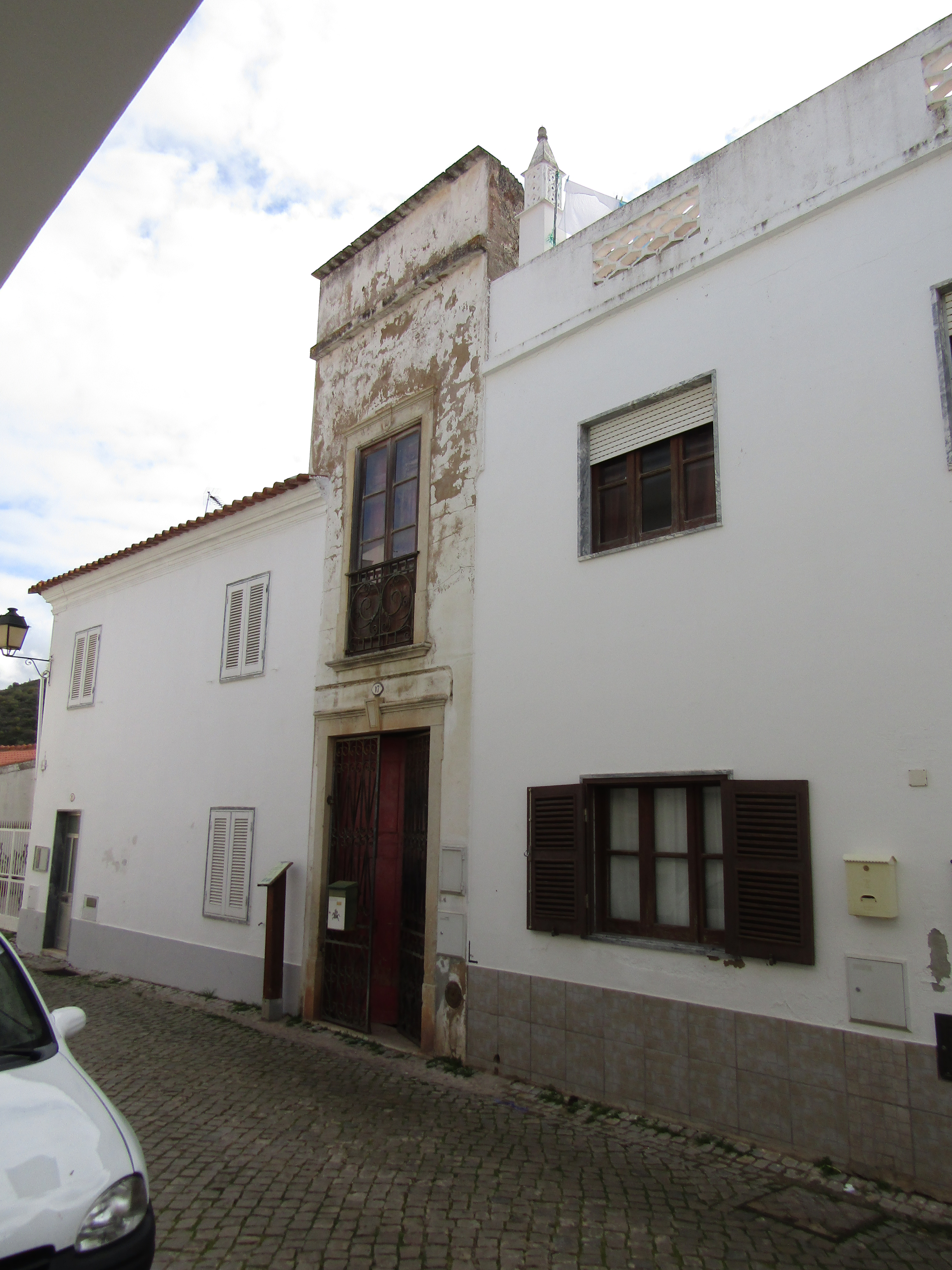
Birthplace of the Poet Cândido Guerreiro located on Rua Poeta Cândido Guerreiro.

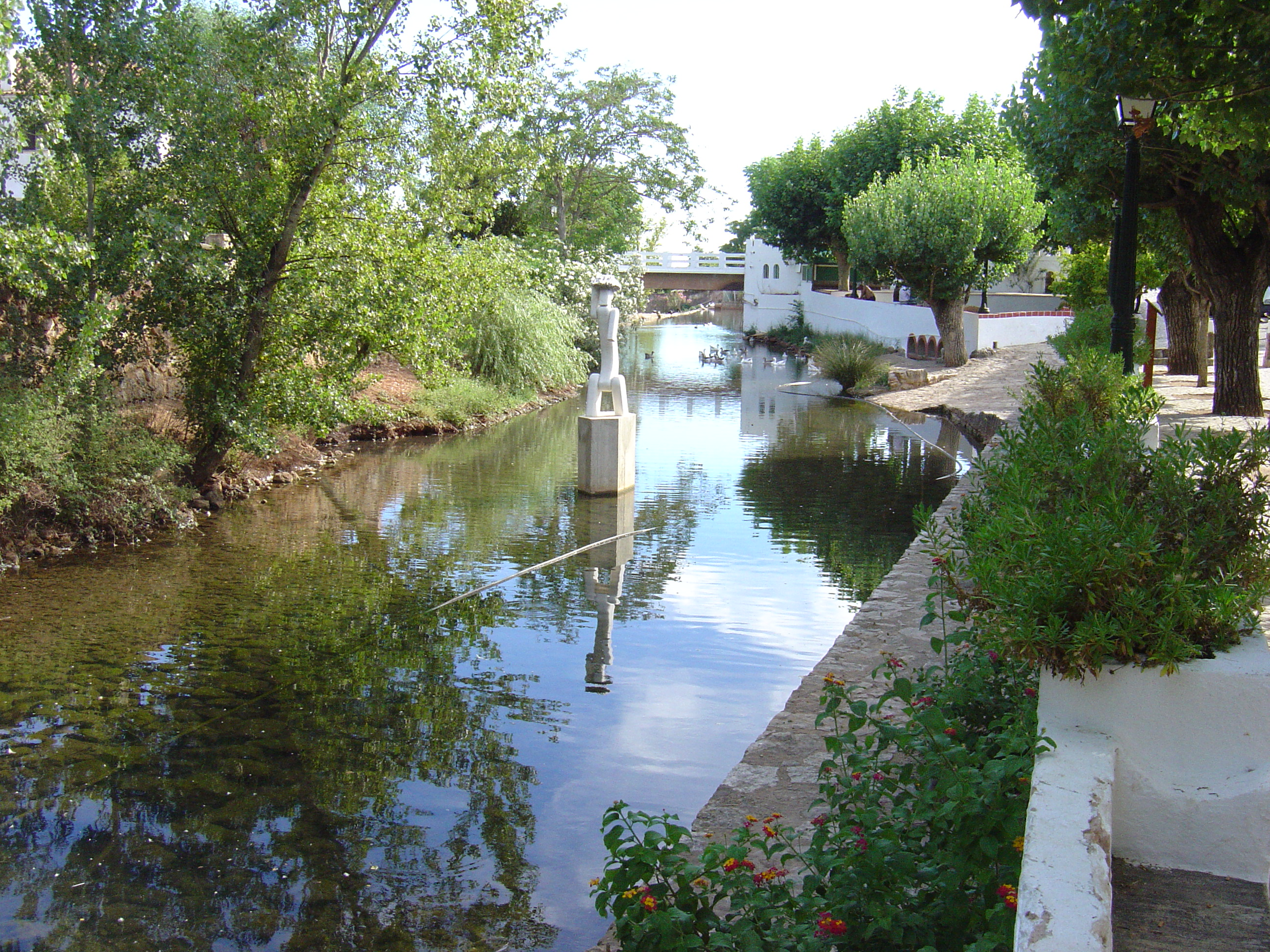
Fonte Pequena ("Small Fountain") waterway.

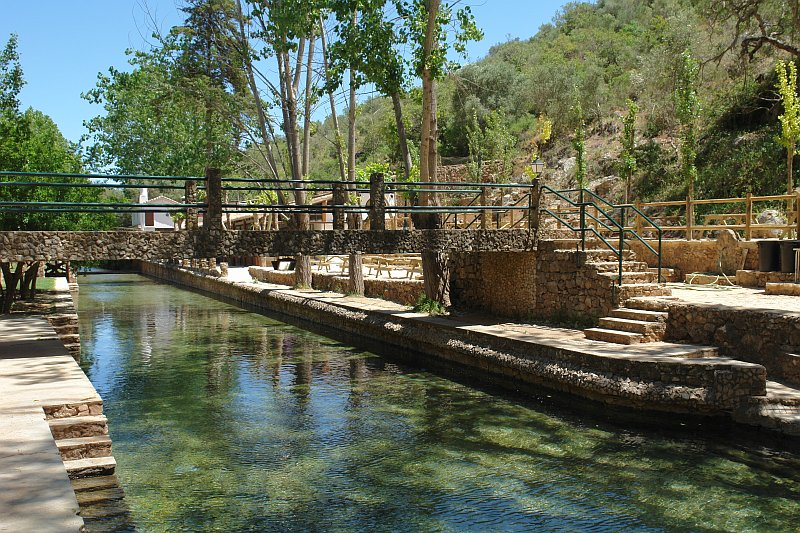
Fonte Grande ("Big Fountain") swimming and leisure area.

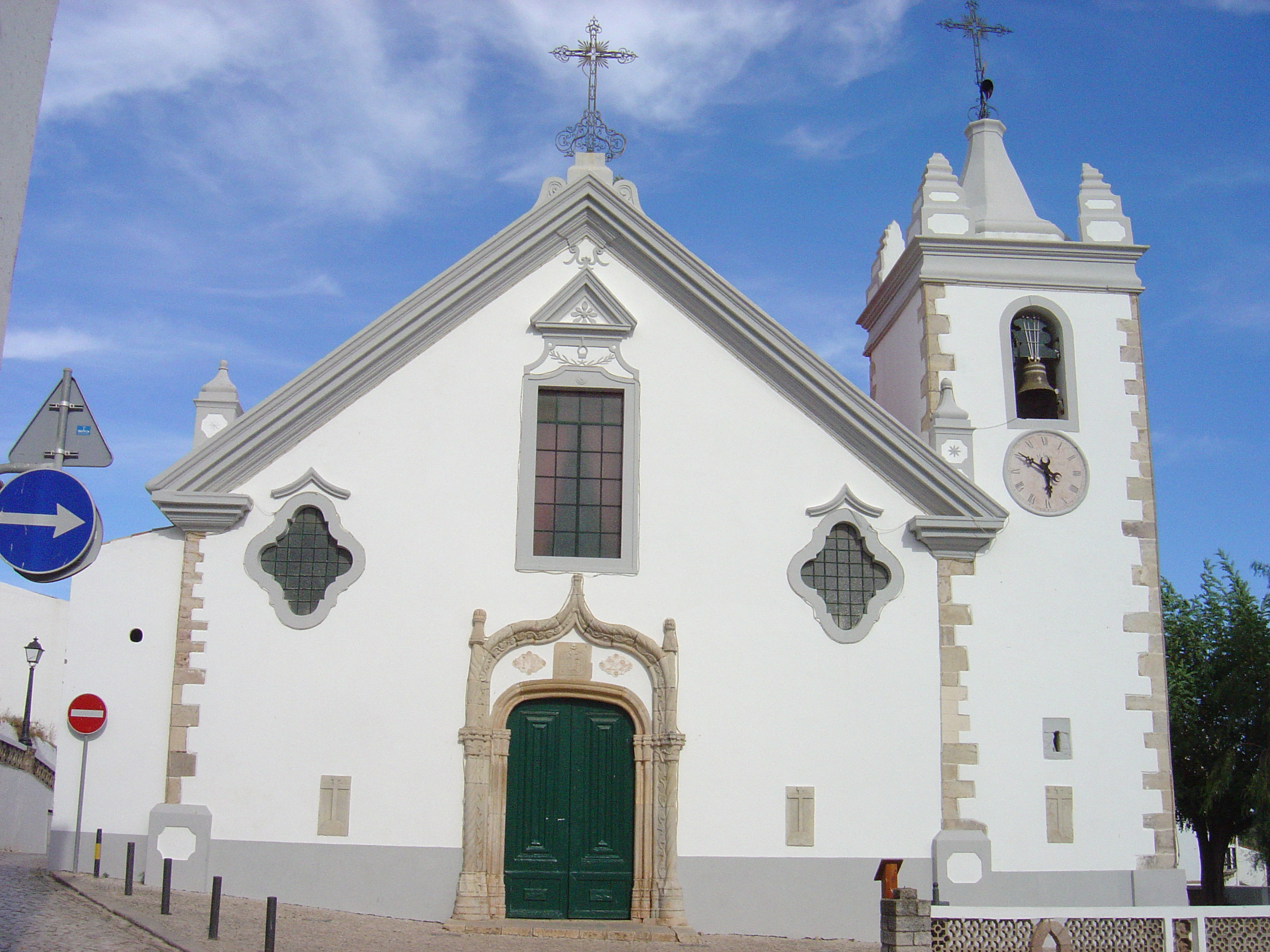
Church of Our Lady of the Assumption.

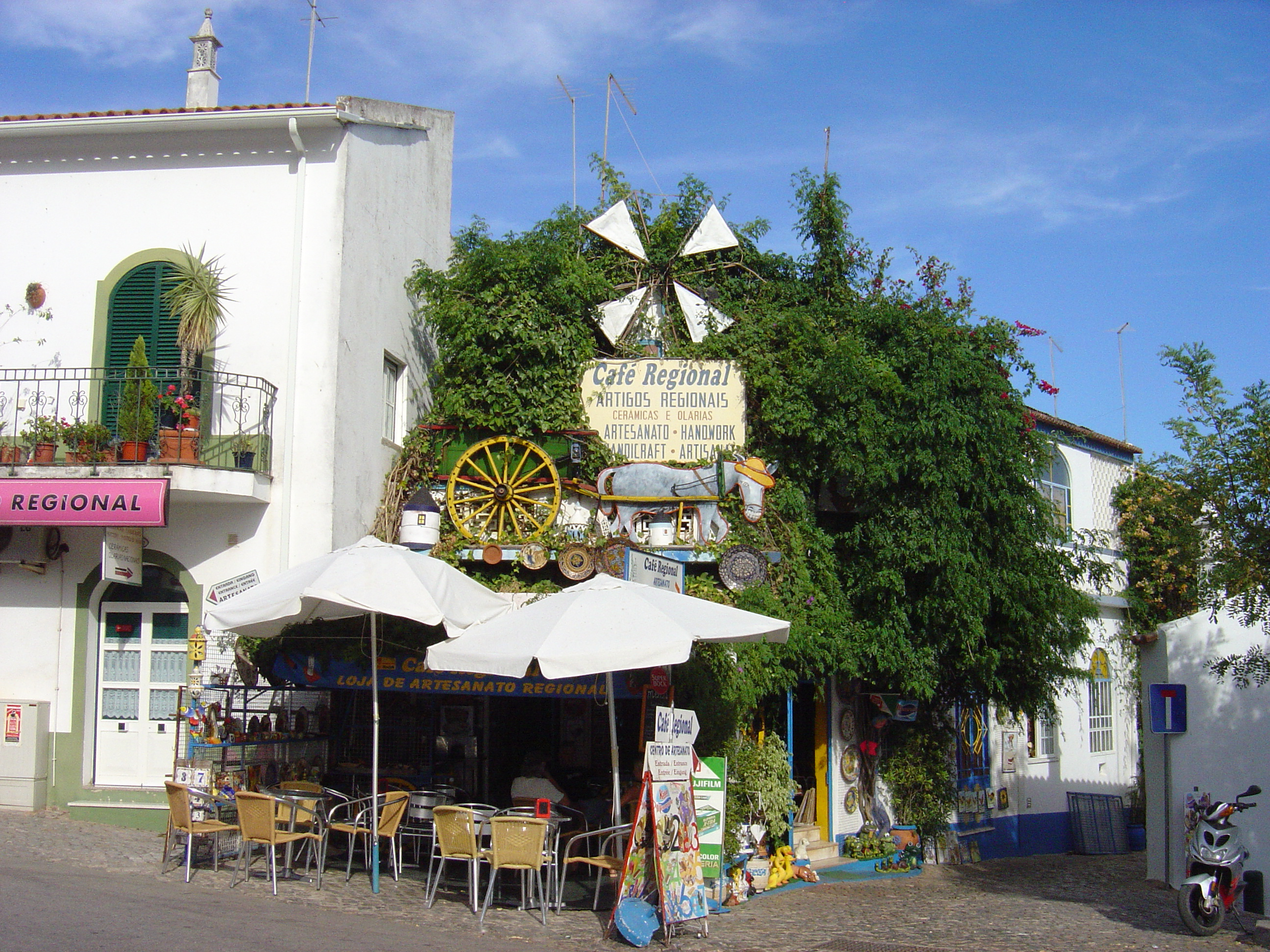
"Café Regional".

== See also ==
- Alte River
