= Querença =

- Civil Parish
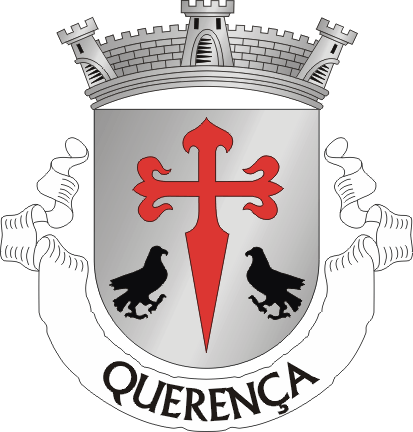
- Coat of arms
- Interactive map of Querença
- Coordinates: 37°11′56″N 7°59′16″W
- Country: Portugal
- Region: Algarve
- Subregion: Algarve
- District: Faro
- Municipality: Loulé

Area
  - Total: 37.18 km^{2} (14.36 sq mi)

Population
  - Total: 759
  - Density: 20.4/km^{2} (52.9/sq mi)
- Time zone: UTC0 (WET)
  - Summer (DST): UTC+1 (WEST)
- Postal Zone: 8100-129
- Area code: (+351) 289 XX XX XX
- Geographic detail from CAOP (2010) produced by Instituto Geográfico Português (IGP)

Querença (European Portuguese pronunciation: [kɨɾẽsɐ]) is a former civil parish in the municipality of Loulé, eastern Algarve, Portugal. In 2013, the parish merged into the new parish Querença, Tôr e Benafim. Located north of Loulé proper, Querença is an area of 37.18 square kilometres (14.36 mi^{2}) with a population of 759 inhabitants (based on 2011 census).

== History ==
Due to the creation of the parish of Tôr, in 1997, Querença was reduced in its geographic extent.

== Geography ==
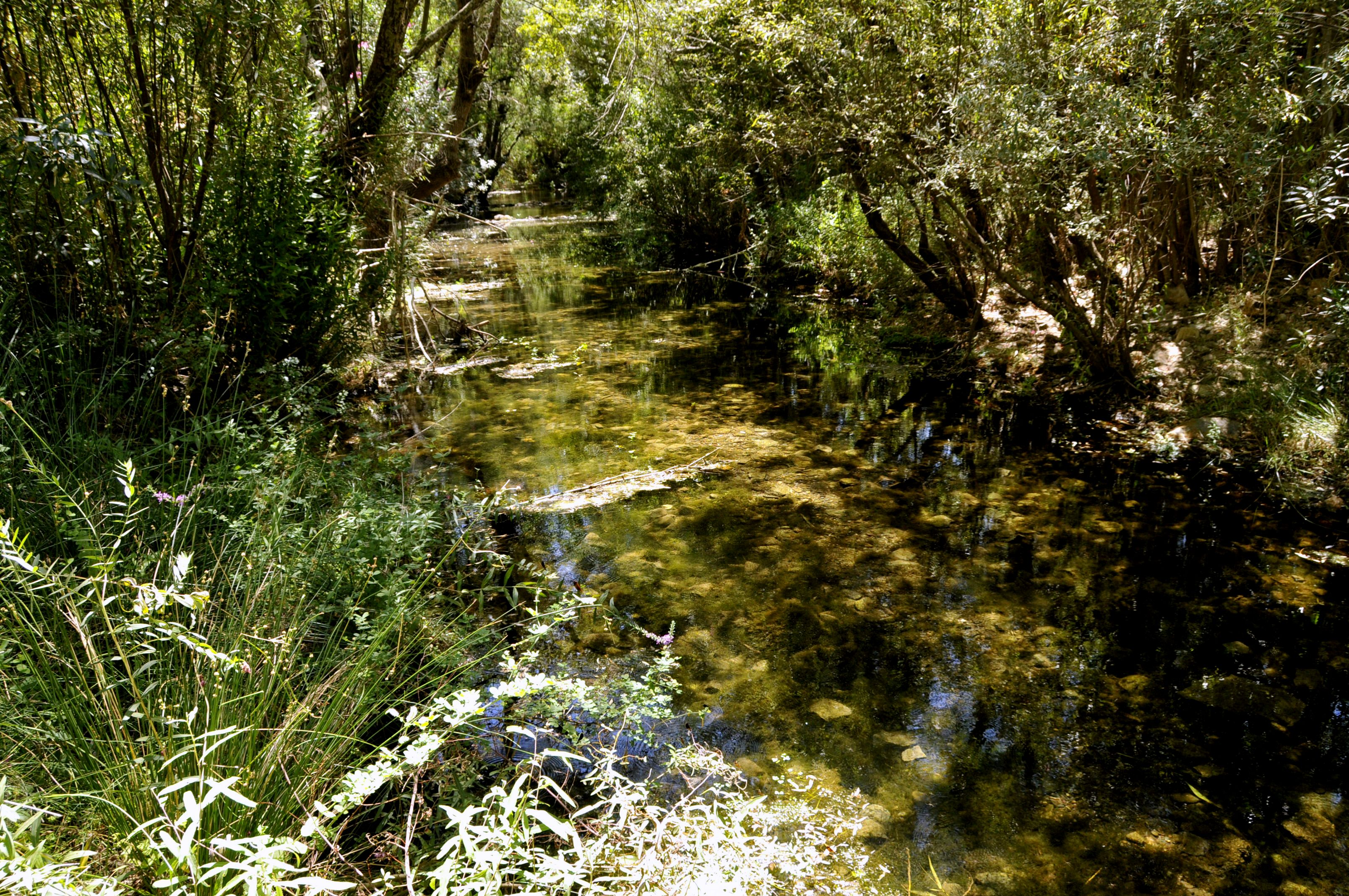
The waters of the Fonte da Benémola, a marsh-like river course

Situated on a hilltop, that provides the parish with its name, the parish is in the transitional area between the Barrocal and the mountains. Many of the parishes' homes descend these slopes, in many directions.

The caverns of Salustreira, with a length of 80 metres (260 ft) and 8 metres (26 ft) height, are located alongside the Fonte da Benémola, a protected area, an important point of visit to the parish. Fonte da Benémola covers an area of 392 hectares, intersected by the Ribeira de Menalva, an affluent that maintains 60% of its flow throughout the year.

== Architecture ==
=== Civic ===
- Fountain of Benemola (Portuguese: Fonte de Benémola)
- Lime Kilns of Fonte Benémola (Portuguese: Fornos de Cal em Fonte da Benémola)
- Roman Bridge of Tôr (Portuguese: Ponte Romana de Tôr/Ponte Romana de Tor)
- Water Mill of Fonte Benémola (Portuguese: Moinho de Água da Fonte Benémola)

=== Religious ===
- Church of Nossa Senhora da Assunção (Portuguese: Igreja Paroquial de Querença/Igreja de Nossa Senhora da Assunção)

== Culture ==
The parish is famous for its arbutus, producing an appreciated sausage, along with other varieties. The Festa das Chouriças is, among others, one of the high points of the parish's annual festivities, in Querença. Local gastronomy is preserved by many of the restaurants, including: Galinha Cerejada, Galo de Cabidela and Xerém (a maize porridge, traditional in the Algarve).
