= Paderne (Albufeira) =

- Civil parish
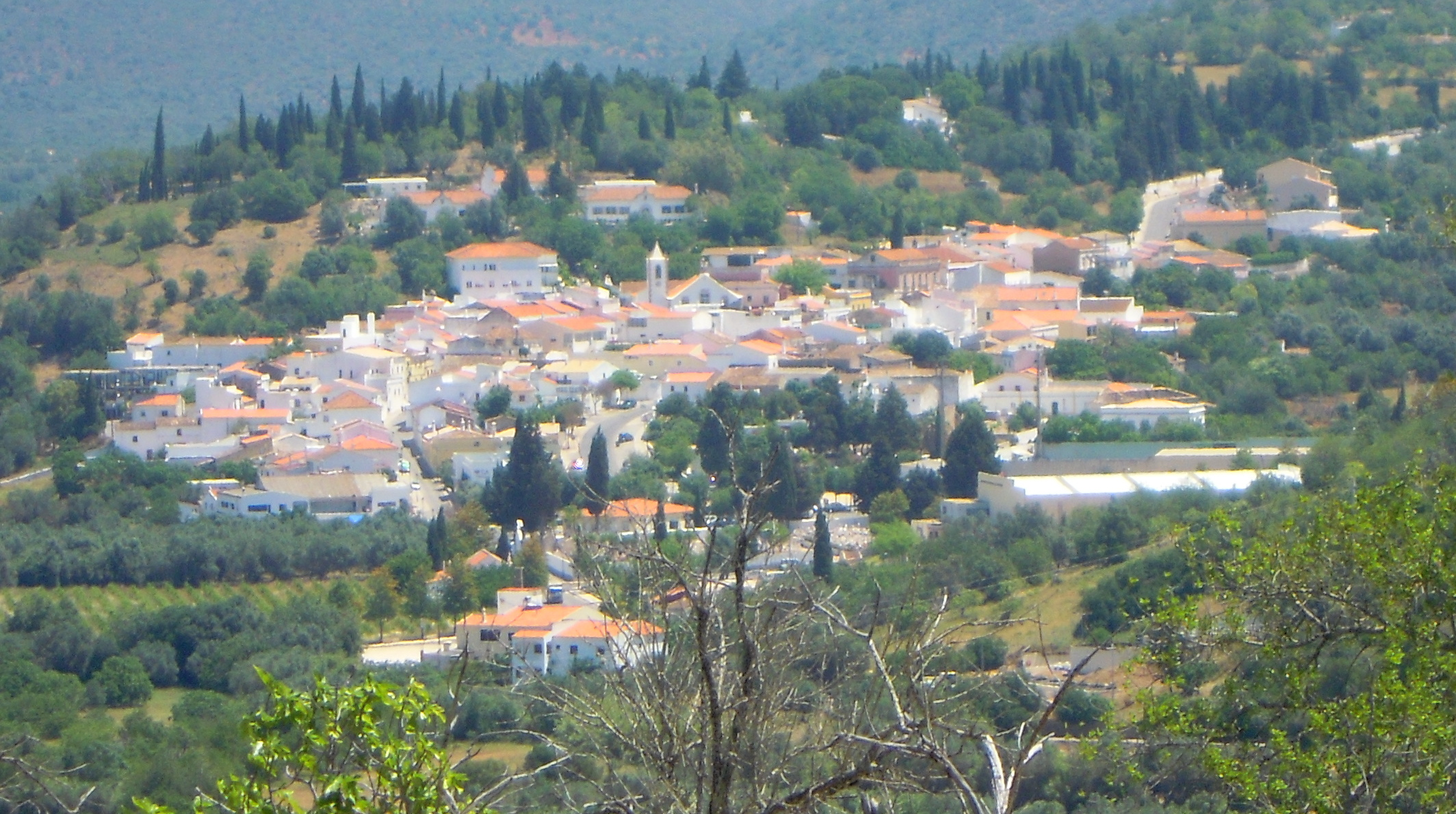

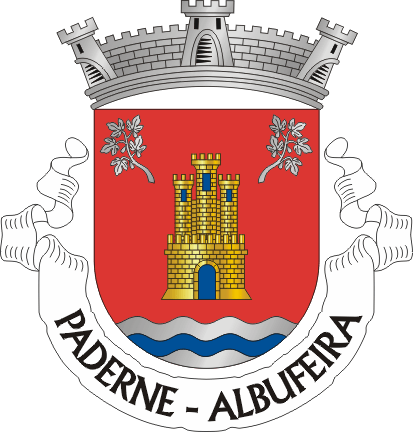
- Coat of arms

- Location in Portugal
- Coordinates: 37.176°N 8.201°W
- Country: Portugal
- Region: Algarve
- Intermunic. comm.: Algarve
- District: Faro
- Municipality: Albufeira

Area
  - Total: 52.56 km^{2} (20.29 sq mi)

Population (2011)
  - Total: 3,304
  - Density: 62.86/km^{2} (162.8/sq mi)
- Time zone: UTC+00:00 (WET)
  - Summer (DST): UTC+01:00 (WEST)
- Postal code: 8200
- Area code: 289
- Patron: Nossa Senhora da Esperança
- Website: https://www.freguesiadepaderne.pt/

Paderne is a village and civil parish in the municipality (concelho) of Albufeira, in the Portuguese region of Algarve. The population in 2011 was 3,304, in an area of 52.56 km^{2}.

== History ==
The name Paderne derives from the lower Latin word Paterni, which means estate of Paterno, used when the area was part of the Roman Empire. But Paderne, or as it was formerly called, Paderna, was also an old toponymy whose origins were in the Lusitanian culture, signifying rough, tough, hard and intractable. The Veiga archaeological crews discovered underground galleries in the settlement that they attributed to prehistoric peoples, although local storytellers indicated that these caverns were used by Moorish peoples as barns or granaries. These galleries were once used as copper mines, but later reused by the peoples that dominated the Algarve: the Phoenicians, Romans, Goths and Arabs.

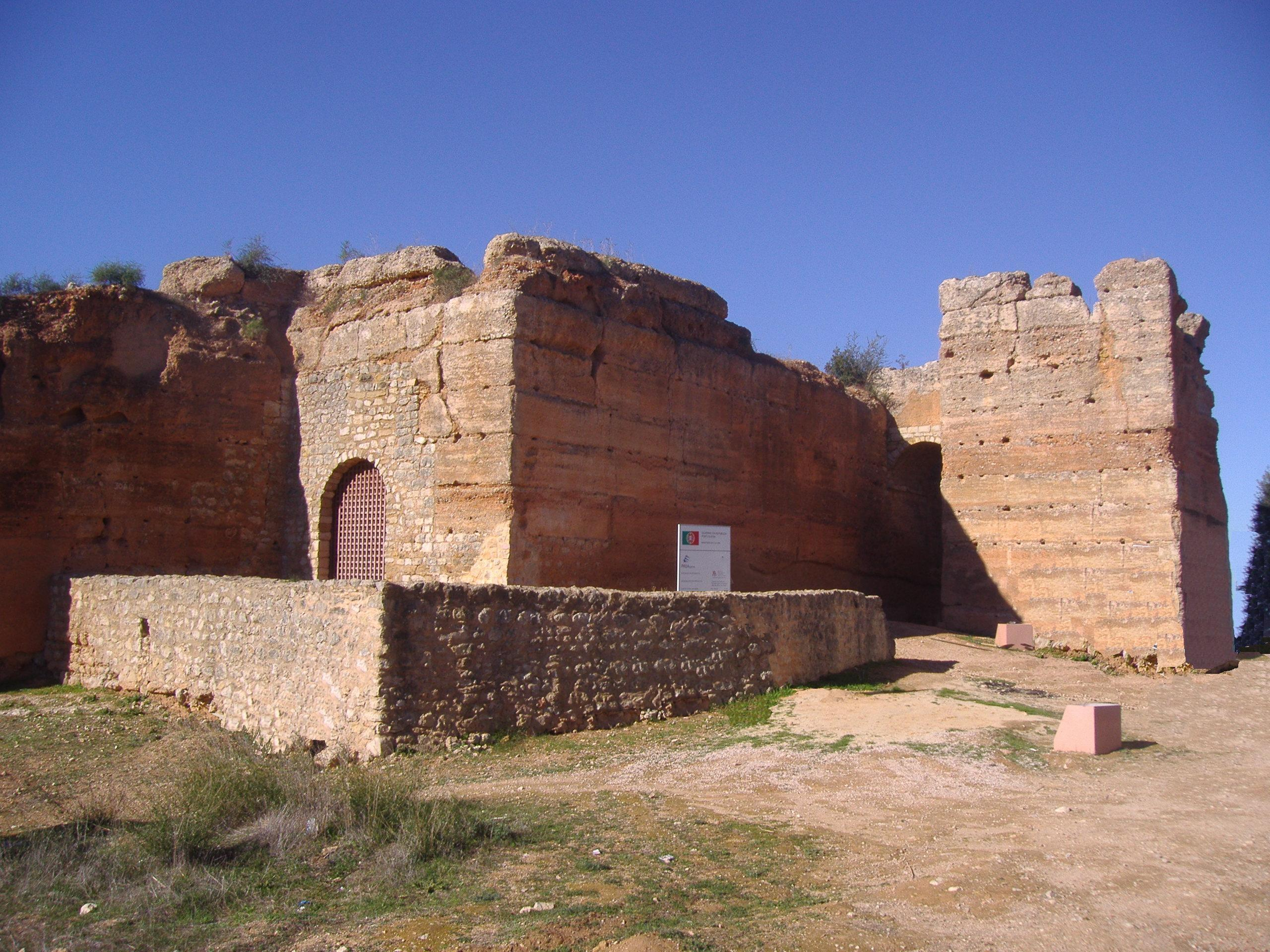
Castle of Paderne.

Around 2 kilometres (1.2 mi) from these structures is the Castle of Paderne, constructed in the 13th century during the Almohad caliphate, a Moorish group from North Africa that dominated the area at the end of the 12th century. The fortification not only defended the settlement of Paderne, but also controlled passage into the Barrocal and coastal Algarve. Constructed from taipa, its entrance is defended by a tower and barbican. The castle was taken by Christian forces of King Sancho I of Portugal, but retaken by the Moors again, who kept it until 1248, when knights of the Order of St. James, under Paio Peres Correia, defeated the Islamic garrison. By regal charter, on 1 January 1305, King Denis donated the castle and clergy to the Master of Avis, Lourenço Anes; this Order of Avis also occupied Albufeira at the time. In 1575, the first reference to a parish seat in Paderne occurred, and records from the local authority show that the change from ecclesiastical seat to parish occurred around 1500. The new church continued to be a priory of the Order of Avis, even as the settlement declined in importance, a decline accelerated after the 1755 Lisbon earthquake when the fortress of Paderne was heavily damaged. The castle of Paderne was purchased in 1997 by the Instituto Português do Património Aqruitectónico, or IPPA, the forerunner of the National Registry IGESPAR.

== Geography ==
The centre, and main settlement, of Paderne is located 7.4 miles (11.9 km) north of Albufeira, 23 miles (37 km) west of Faro and is 151 miles (243 km) from Lisbon.

The parish is accessible through the national roadway/highway network, along the junctions of the A2 motorway (from Lisbon) and the IP1 coastal motorway. Flights to the region are handled through the gateway at Faro, while rail services run through the CP byway of Albufeira. The railway station of Albufeira / Ferreiras is 5.5 miles / 8.8 km from Paderne. Local buses operate from Albufeira town to Paderne.

== Architecture ==
=== Civic ===
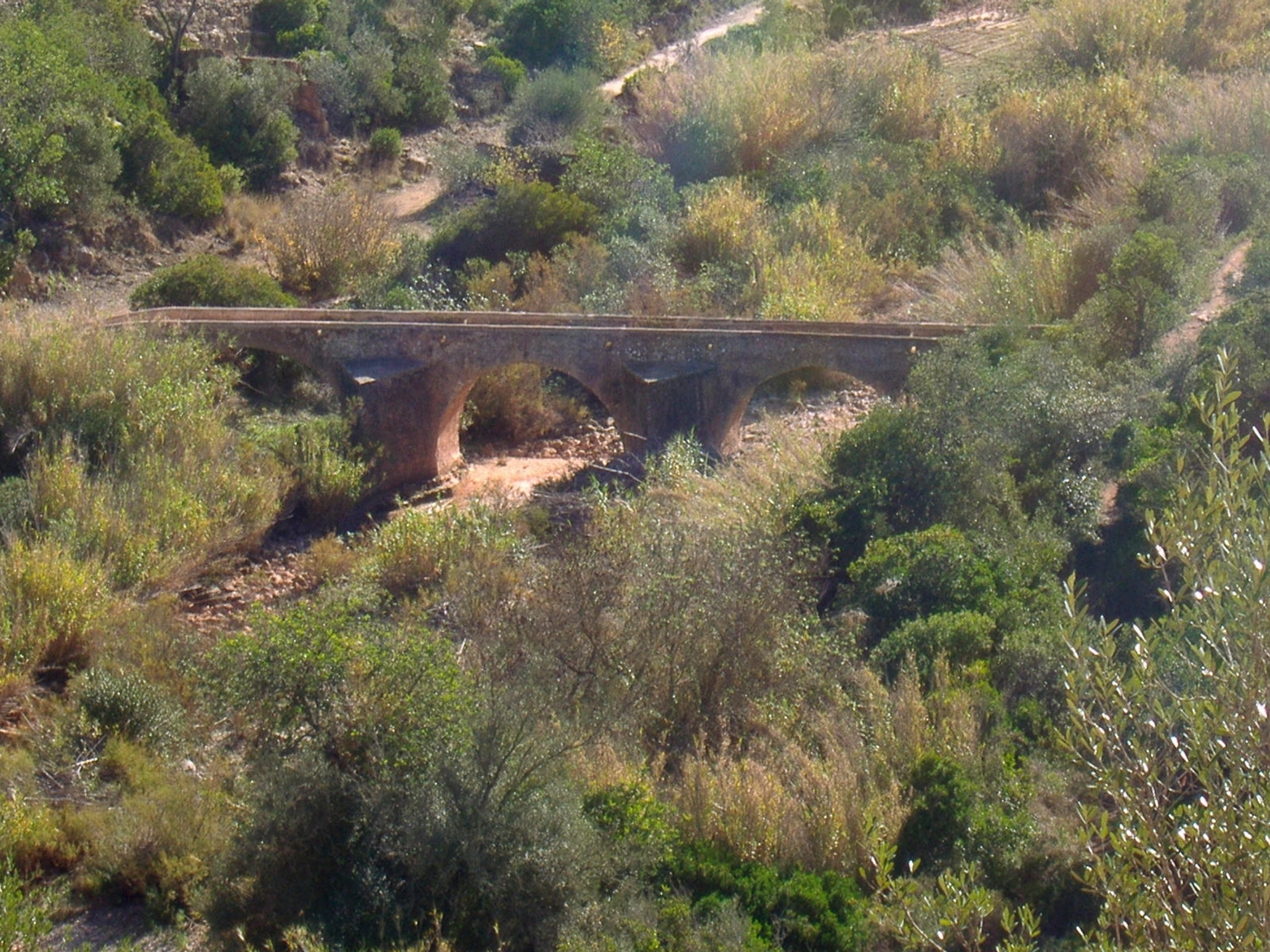
The medieval bridge of Paderne, wrongly assumed to have originated during Roman occupation.

- Bridge of Paderne (Ponte de Paderne), built in the Middle Ages and restored in 1771. The rectangular bridge is built over three arches, the central arch is a pyramidal apex.
- Fountain of Paderne (Fonte em Paderne), an 18th-century fountain included as part of the Natura 2000 sectoral plan, for the Riberia do Quarteira;
- Residence of Mem Moniz (Moradia em Mem Moniz/Casa de Paderne), designed by Manuel Maria Cristóvão Laginha (1919-1985), the private home was classified as national patrimony for its Estado Novo-era design;
- Watermill of Paderne (Azenha em Paderne/Moinho de Água em Paderne), under study by the beginning of the 21st century, the watermill included the millers' home, serving the early community of Paderne;
- Sports Pavilion (Pavilhão Desportivo de Paderne)the village has an imposing indoor sports hall, home to the successful Paderne Ladies Futsal indoor soccer team.
- Paderne FC stadium (Estádio João Campos) is a surface football (soccer) stadium used by the Padernense Clube. Regrettably, the senior (adult) team folded at the end of the 2010/2011 season. Prior to that, they competed in the Algarve Football League.

=== Military ===
The Castle of Paderne, a former Moorish citadel conquered by the forces of Paio Peres Correia during the Reconquista period.

- Castle of Paderne (Castelo de Paderne), believed to be one of the original castles that occupies the shield of the Portuguese national flag, Paderne was a Moorish castle built on the remains of a Roman fortified outpost that was taken during the Reconquista period of Portuguese nationhood;

=== Religious ===
- Hermitage of Nossa Senhora da Pé da Cruz (Ermida de Nossa Senhora do Pé da Cruz), a 17th-century chapel, constructed in the Baroque-style, serving Paderne Castle, notable for its elaborate retable;
- Church of Nossa Senhora da Esperança (Igreja Paroquial de Paderne/Igreja da Senhora da Esperança), the parochial Church of Nossa Senhora da Esperança, dedicated to Our Lady of Hope, was built in the mid 16th century to replace the older Chapel of Nossa Senhora do Pé da Cruz, in the precinct of the nearby castle of Paderne. The building underwent significant alterations in the 18th and 19th centuries. The church includes several Manueline features and combines several aspects of the Renaissance-style architecture, especially its capitals and triumphal arch. Within the church are wooden sculptures dating from the 17th and 18th centuries, including an image of the archangel São Miguel from the 18th century. The church's altars in the chancel and the retable of the Capela do Santíssimo (Chapel of the Most Holy), both constructed during the Baroque, are just a few of the features of the three-nave interior.
