= Quarteira River =

River of the Algarve, Portugal

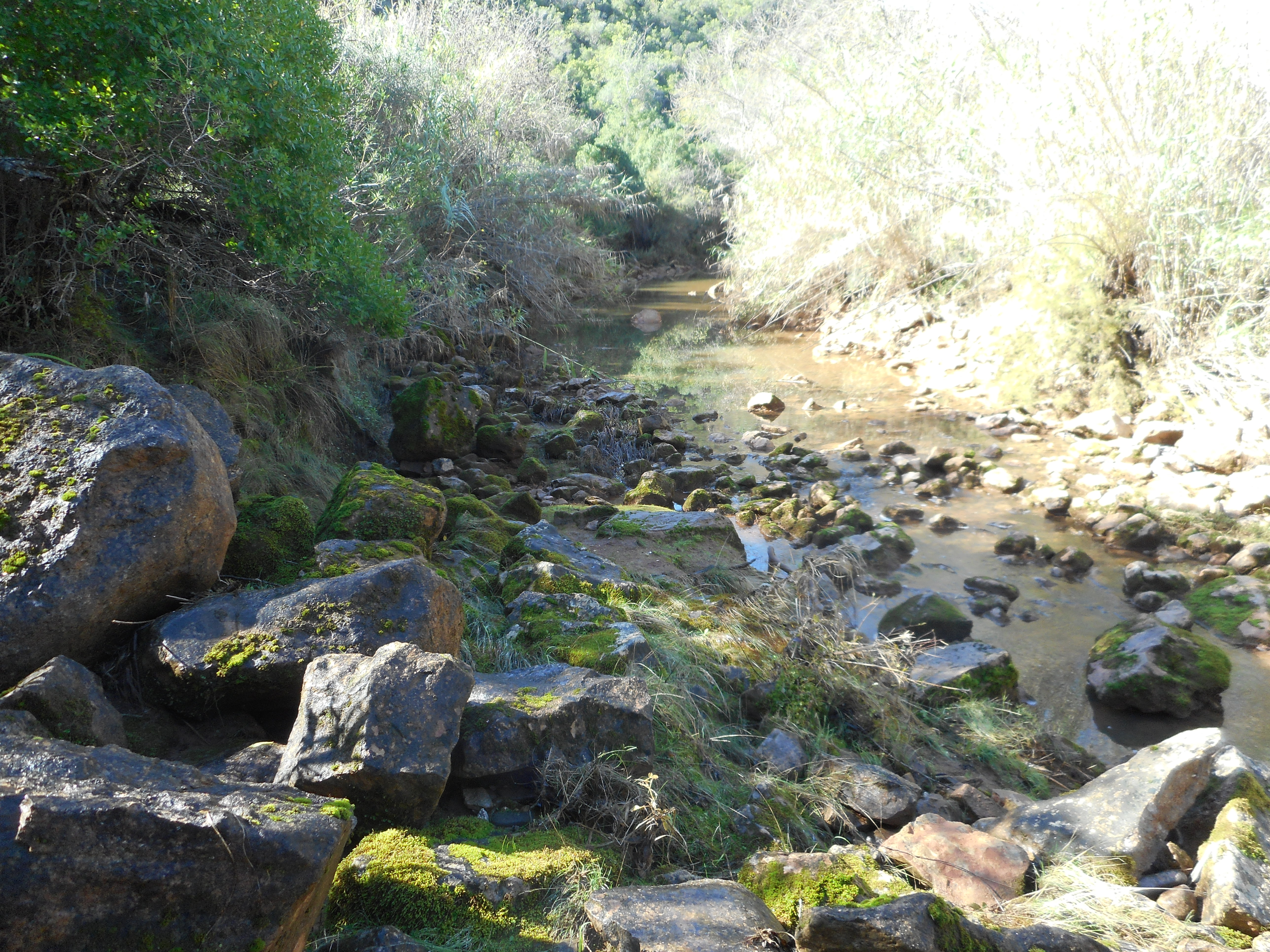
- Quarteira River near the Acudes do Castelo, Paderne

- Mouth of the Quarteira River at Quarteira

Location
- Country: Portugal
- Region: Algarve
- District: Faro
- Municipality: Albufeira

Physical characteristics
- Source: Algibre River
  - location: Paderne, Algarve
  - coordinates: 37°10′51.9″N 8°12′27.8″W
  - elevation: 50 m (160 ft)
- 2nd source: Alte River
  - location: Paderne
  - coordinates: 37°10′51.9″N 8°12′27.8″W
  - elevation: 50 m (160 ft)
- Mouth: Into the Atlantic at Quarteira
  - coordinates: 37.074355°N 8.125467°W

The Quarteira River (Portuguese pronunciation: [kwɐɾˈtɐjɾɐ]) is a small river in the Portuguese region of the Algarve. The river begins at the conflux of two tributary rivers a little north of the village of Paderne. The tributary rivers are the River de Alte and the River de Algibre.

== Description ==
The Quarteira is one of a number of small rivers in the central Algarve which make up the water ecosystem known as the Querença – Silves Aquifer System.

=== Places of interest ===
A short distance from the confluence of the Quarteira the river passes the village of Paderne and then snakes in a large loop around a hill which is topped by the remains of the Moorish Castle of Paderne. Below the castle are the remnants of two watermills. The first is to the Acudes do Castelo which is in the north-west valley below the castle and the second watermill is called Alfarrobeiro and is south of the castle. Next to this watermill stands a Bridge built by the Romans. The Roman bridge is location on the rocky peninsular bend and was of strategic importance to the Romans, as it controlled the ancient Roman road Via Lusitanorum.

== Gallery ==
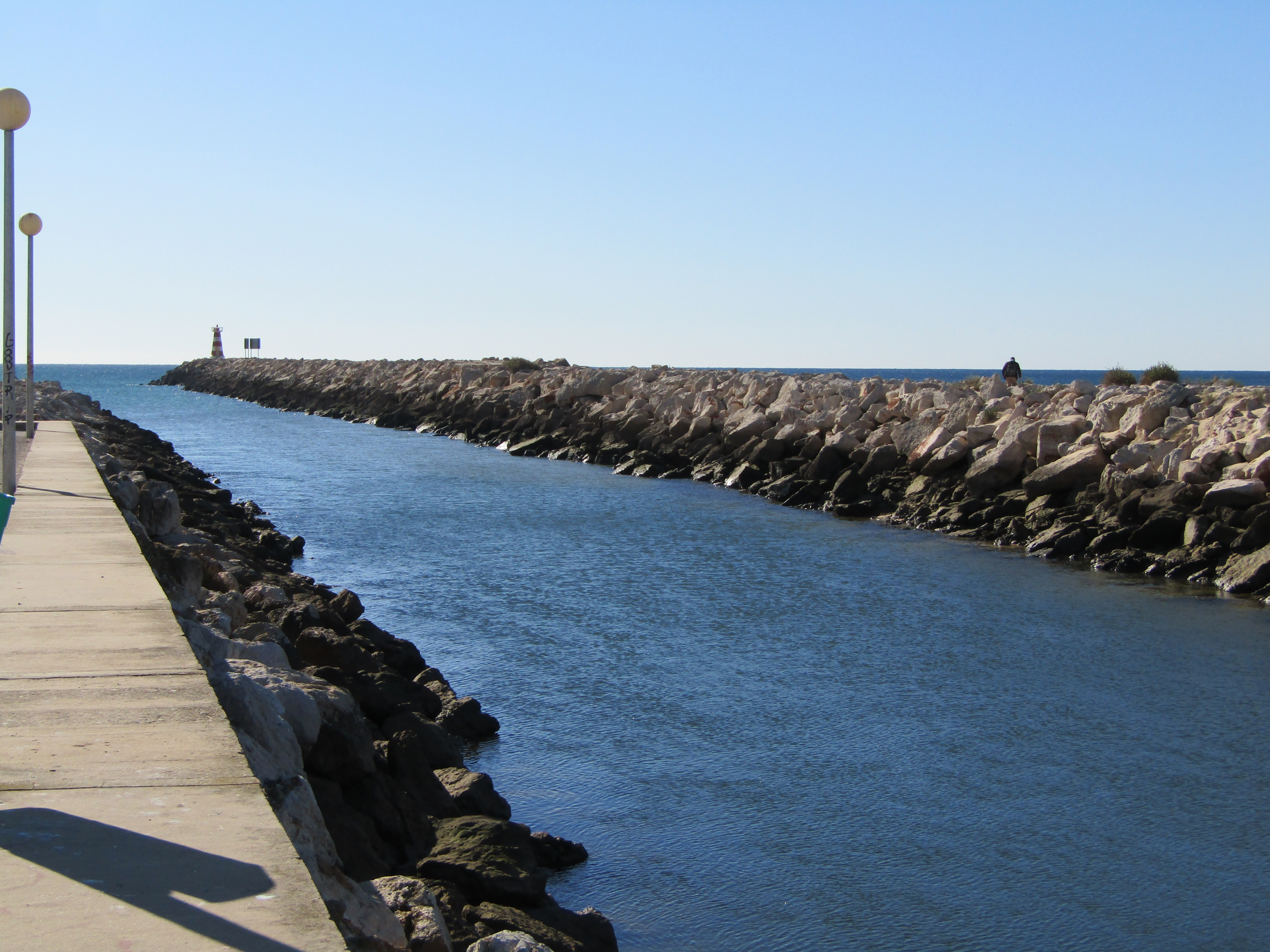
The outfall of Quarteira river into the Atlantic ocean at the entrance to Vilamoura marina which is in the municipality of Loulé, Algarve, Portugal.

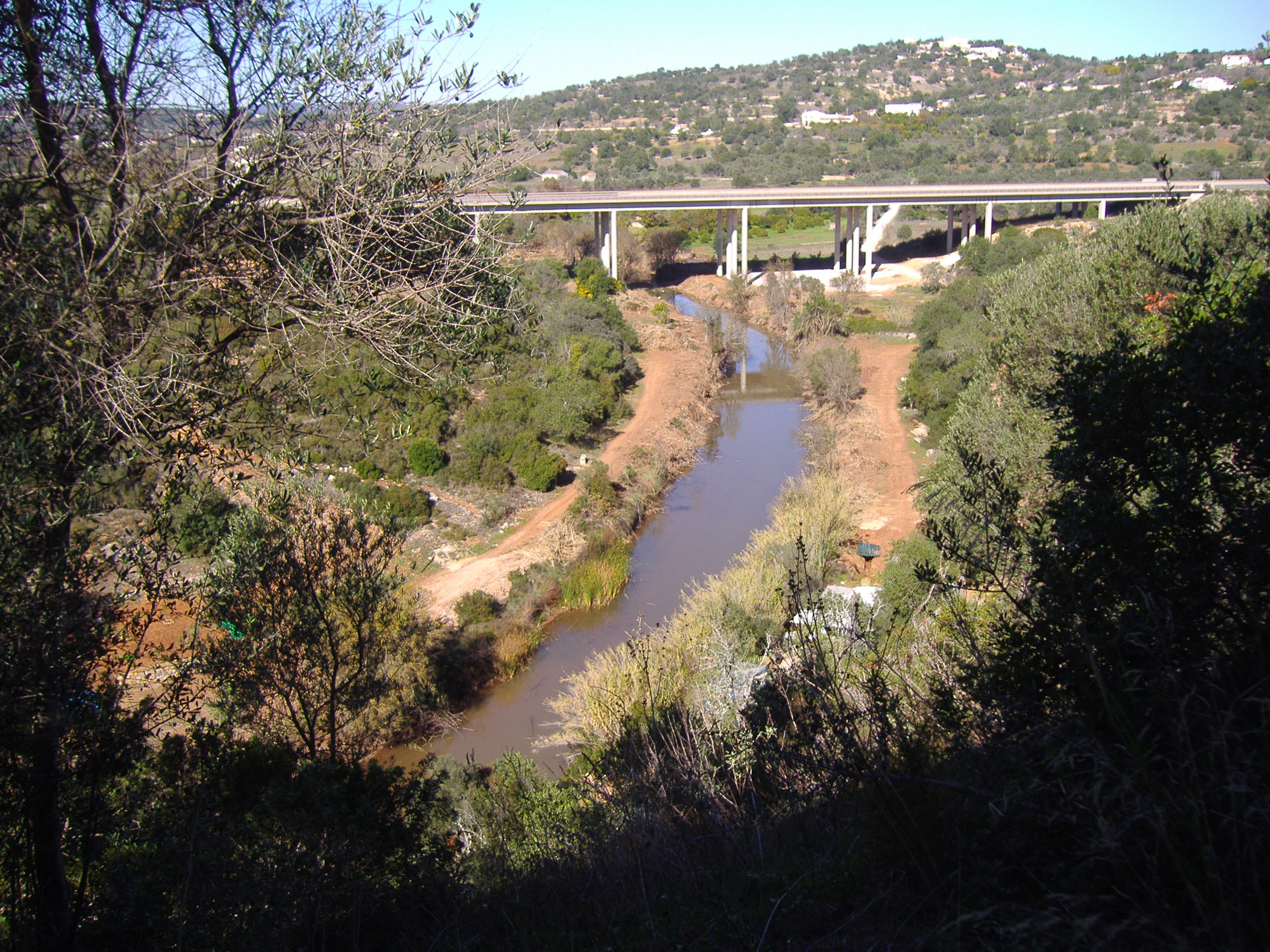
The river passes under the A22-IP1 motorway north of the Castle of Paderne.

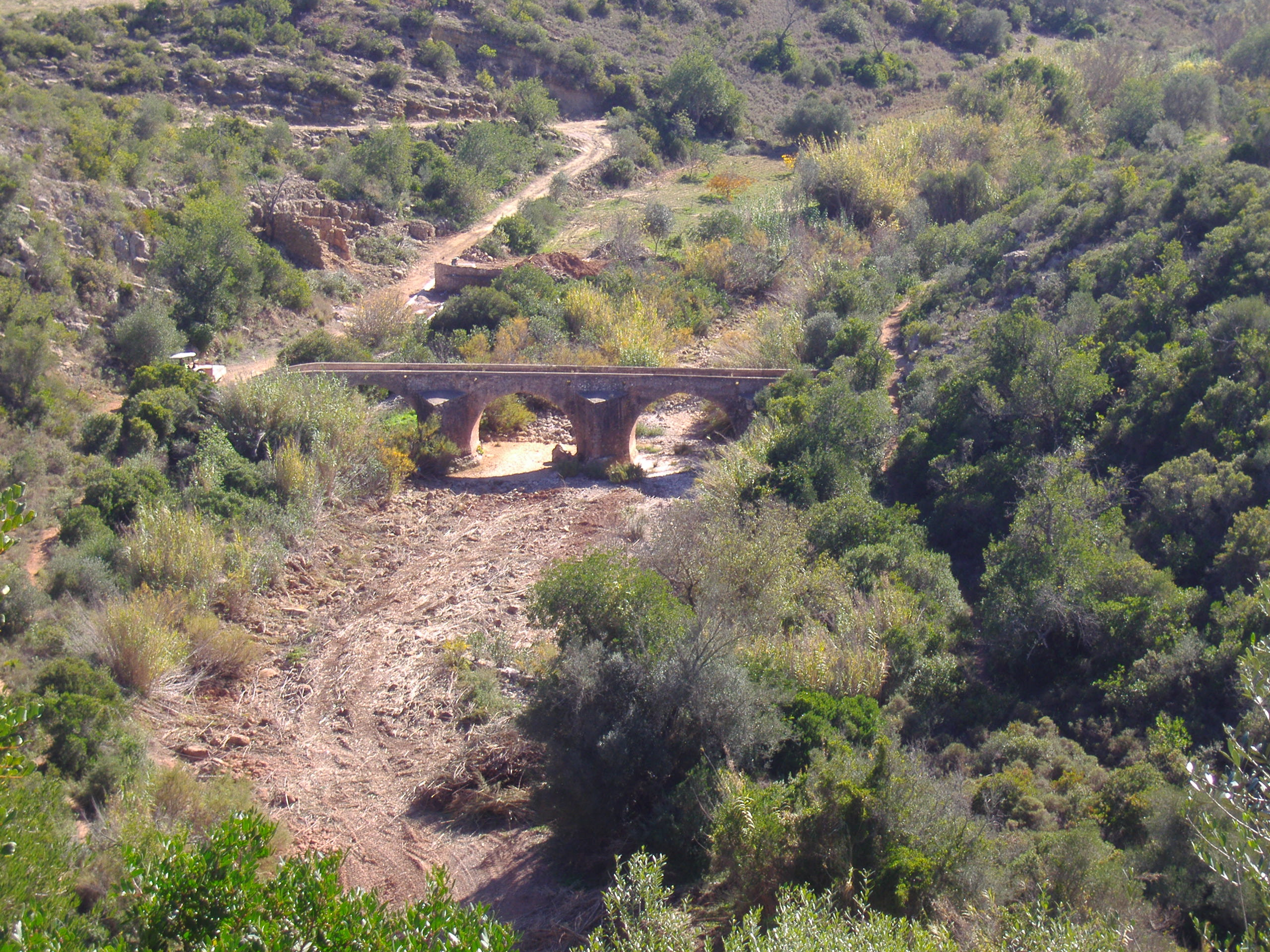
The Roman Bridge near Paderne Castle

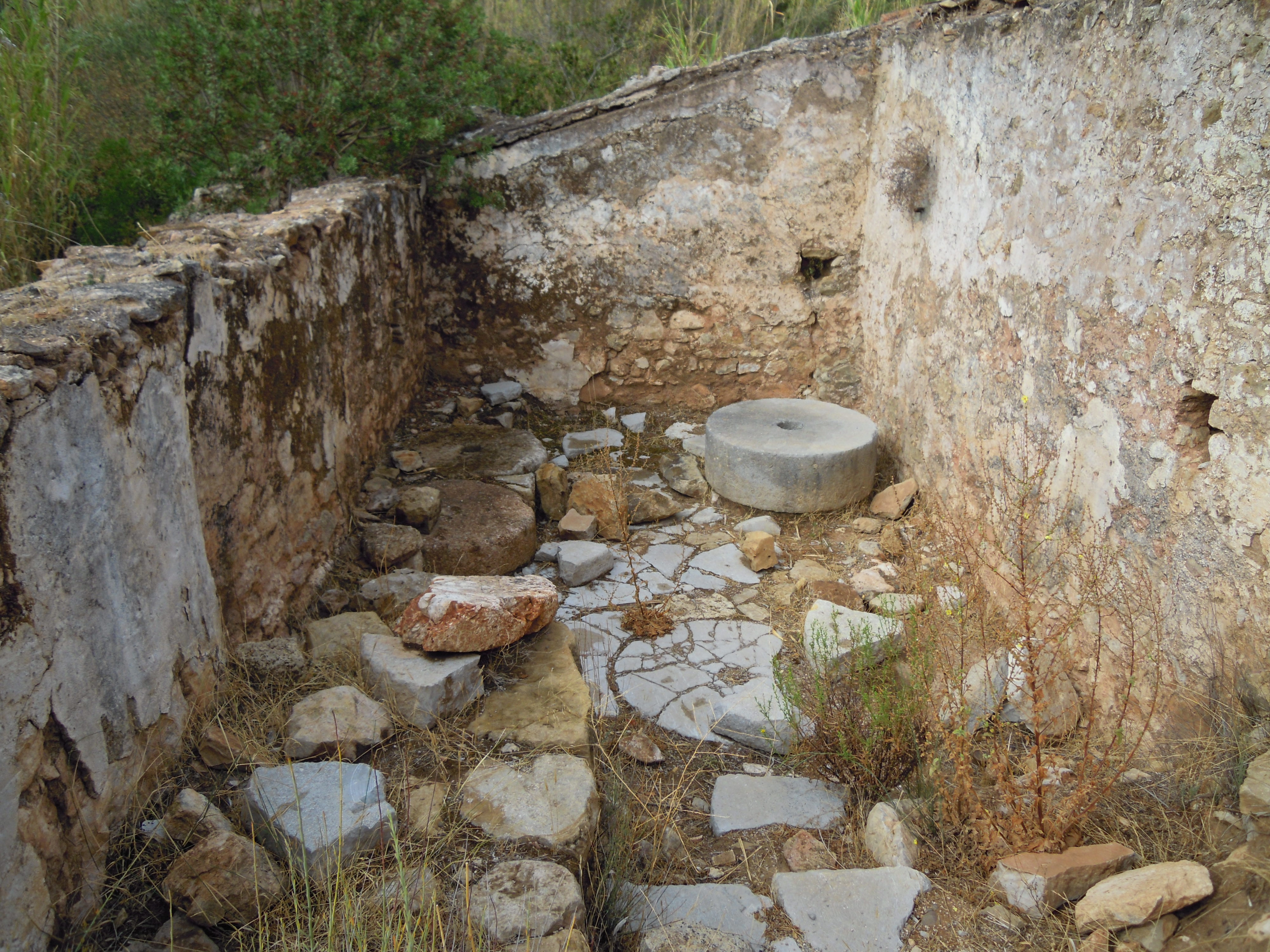
Alfarrobeira Watermill

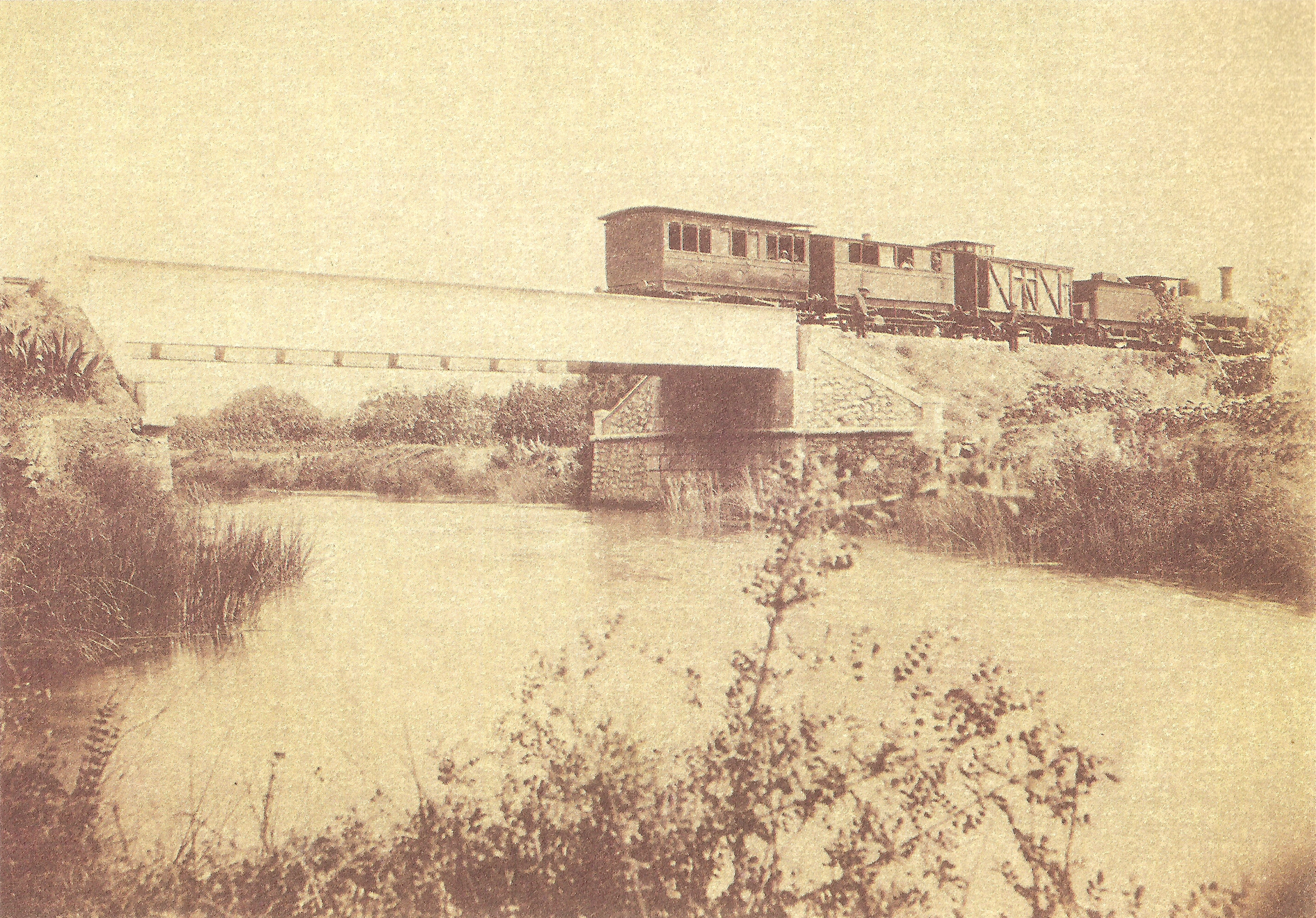
Old photograph of the railway bridge across the river near Boliqueime

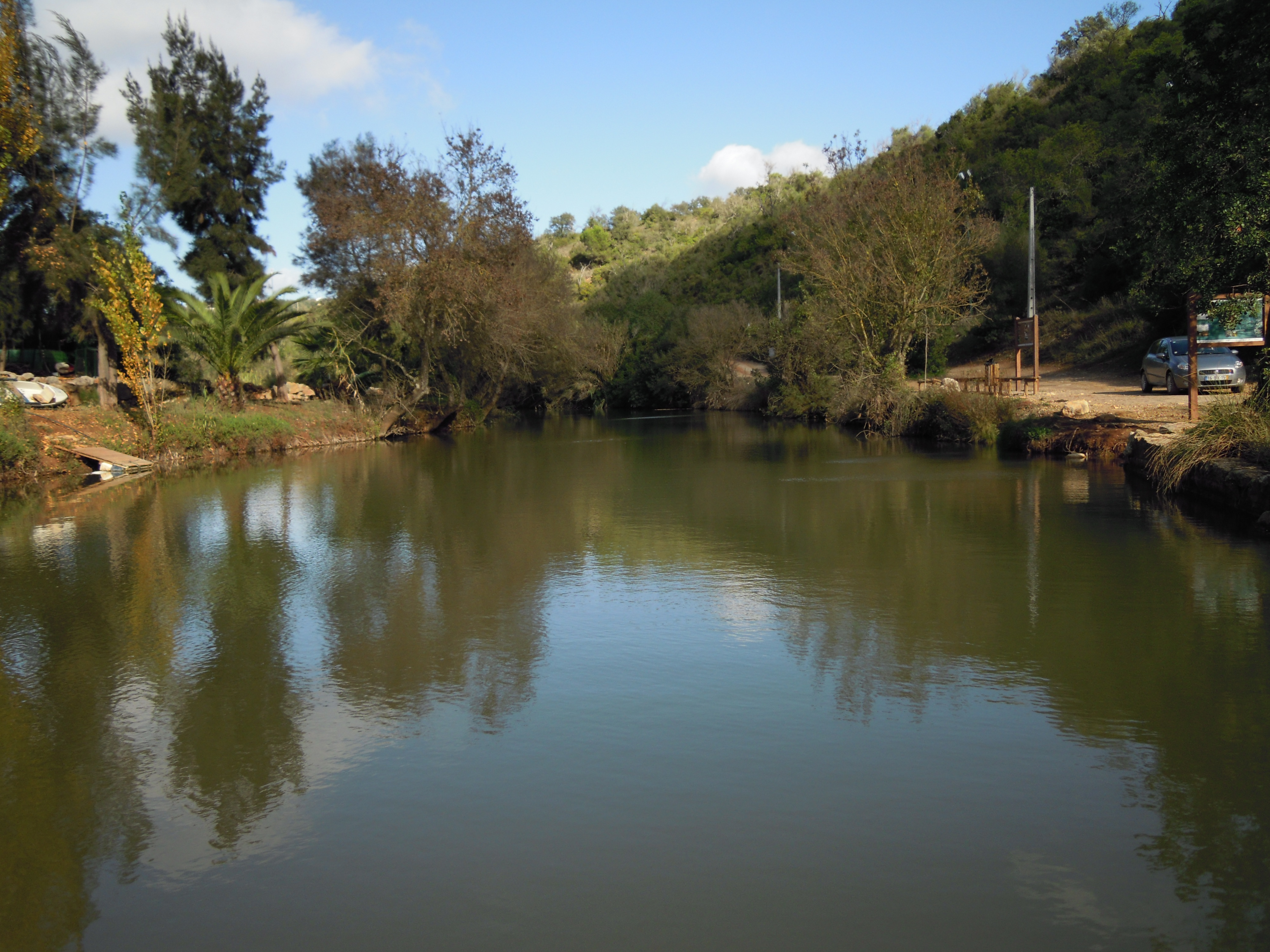
Quarteira River near the Acudes do Castelo, Paderne
