= Castro Laboreiro =

- Civil parish
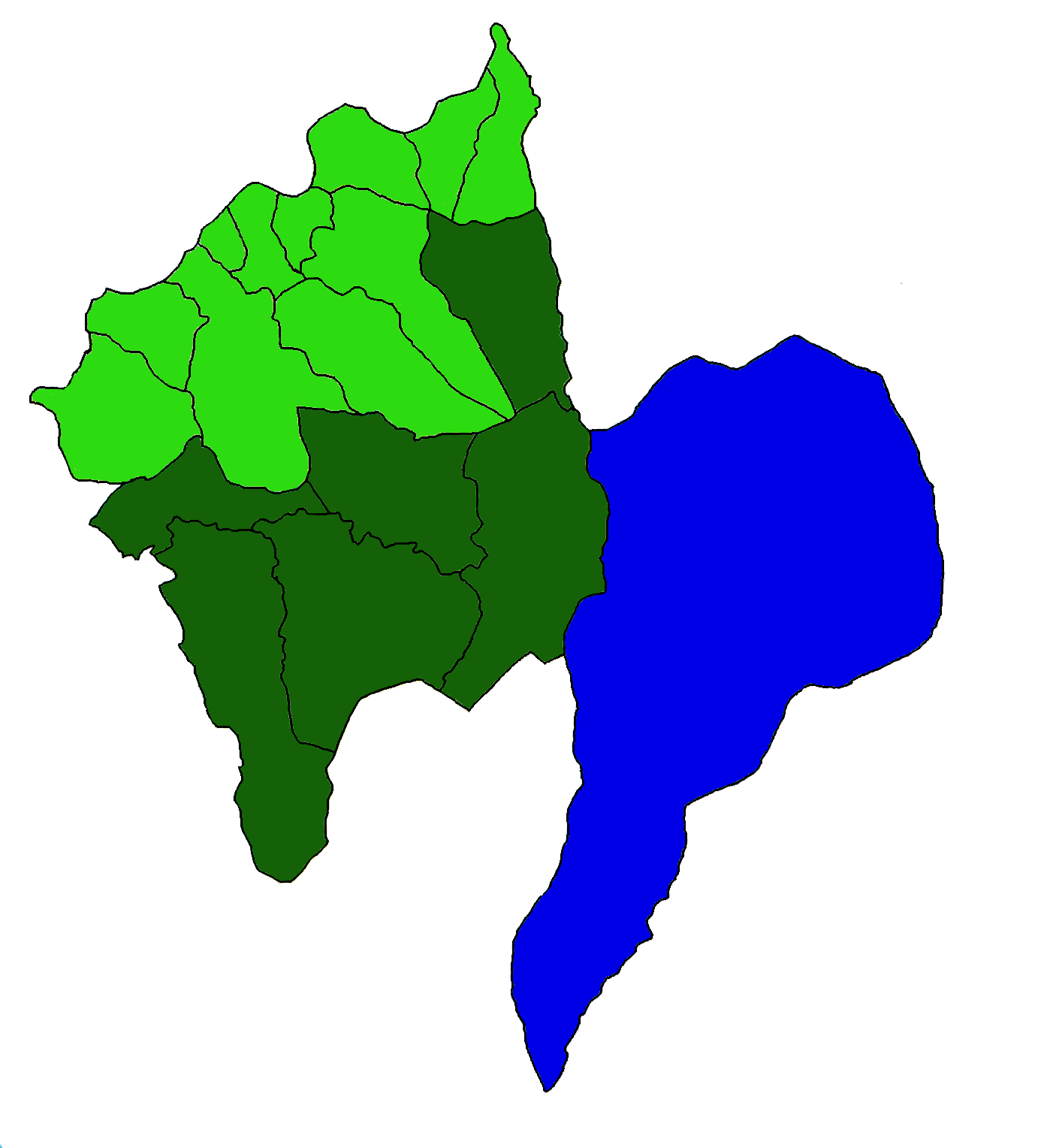
- Coordinates: 42°01.365′N 8°09.488′W
- Country: Portugal
- Region: Norte
- Intermunic. comm.: Alto Minho
- District: Viana do Castelo
- Municipality: Melgaço
- Disbanded: 2013

Area
  - Total: 89.29 km^{2} (34.48 sq mi)

Population
  - Total: 726
  - Density: 8.13/km^{2} (21.1/sq mi)
- Time zone: UTC+00:00 (WET)
  - Summer (DST): UTC+01:00 (WEST)

Castro Laboreiro is a village and a former civil parish in the municipality of Melgaço in the Viana do Castelo District, Portugal. In 2013, the parish merged into the new parish Castro Laboreiro e Lamas de Mouro. It is in the mountain range of the Laboreiro. As of 2001 the area had 726 inhabitants. The name derives from Castro, a hill fort, and Lepporariu, "of hares", a Latin name from Roman times.

== History and scenery ==
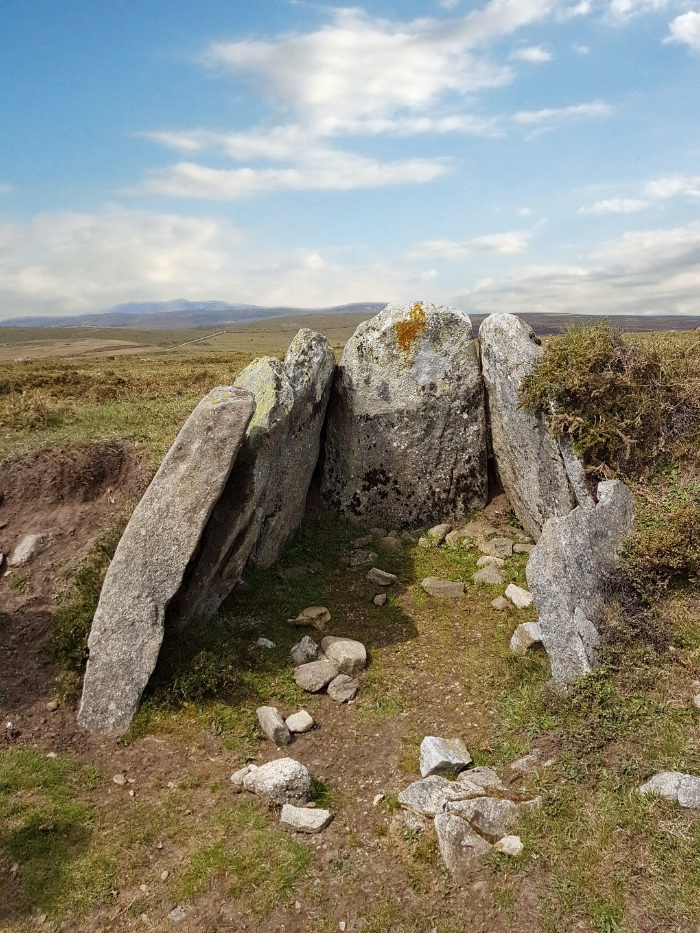
Megalithic necropolis of Castro Laboreiro

There are many archaeological sites in the area that show evidence of very early human occupation.

Cascata do Laboreiro, a waterfall on the Homem River, can be seen from the walls of the ruin of the Castle of Castro Laboreiro, situated above the town.

Roman and medieval bridges are found nearby over the various rivers, including the Laboreiro River, Mire River, and others.

For centuries, the domain passed back and forth between Christian and Muslim rulers. In 1141, D. Afonso Henriques (1112–1185) took control of the castle. In 1944, the castle was classified by the government as a National Monument.

The village also has a pre-Romanesque church, Santa Maria da Visitação, built in the 9th century. The Feast of Santa Maria da Visitação is held on July 6 each year.

Points of interest:

- Castle of Castro Laboreiro
- Church of Santa Maria da Visitação
- Pelourinho de Castro Laboreiro
- Ponte de Varziela
- Ponte das Caínheiras
- Ponte de Assureira, Capela de S. Brás e Moinho de Água
- Ponte de Dorna
- Ponte Nova da Cava da Velha

== See also ==
- Architecture of Portugal
- Peneda-Gerês National Park
- List of bridges in Portugal
- Megalith
- Cão de Castro Laboreiro (Dog of Castro Laboreiro)
