= Ponte da Cava da Velha =

Bridge in Portugal

Bridge of Cava da Velha Ponte da Cava da Velha
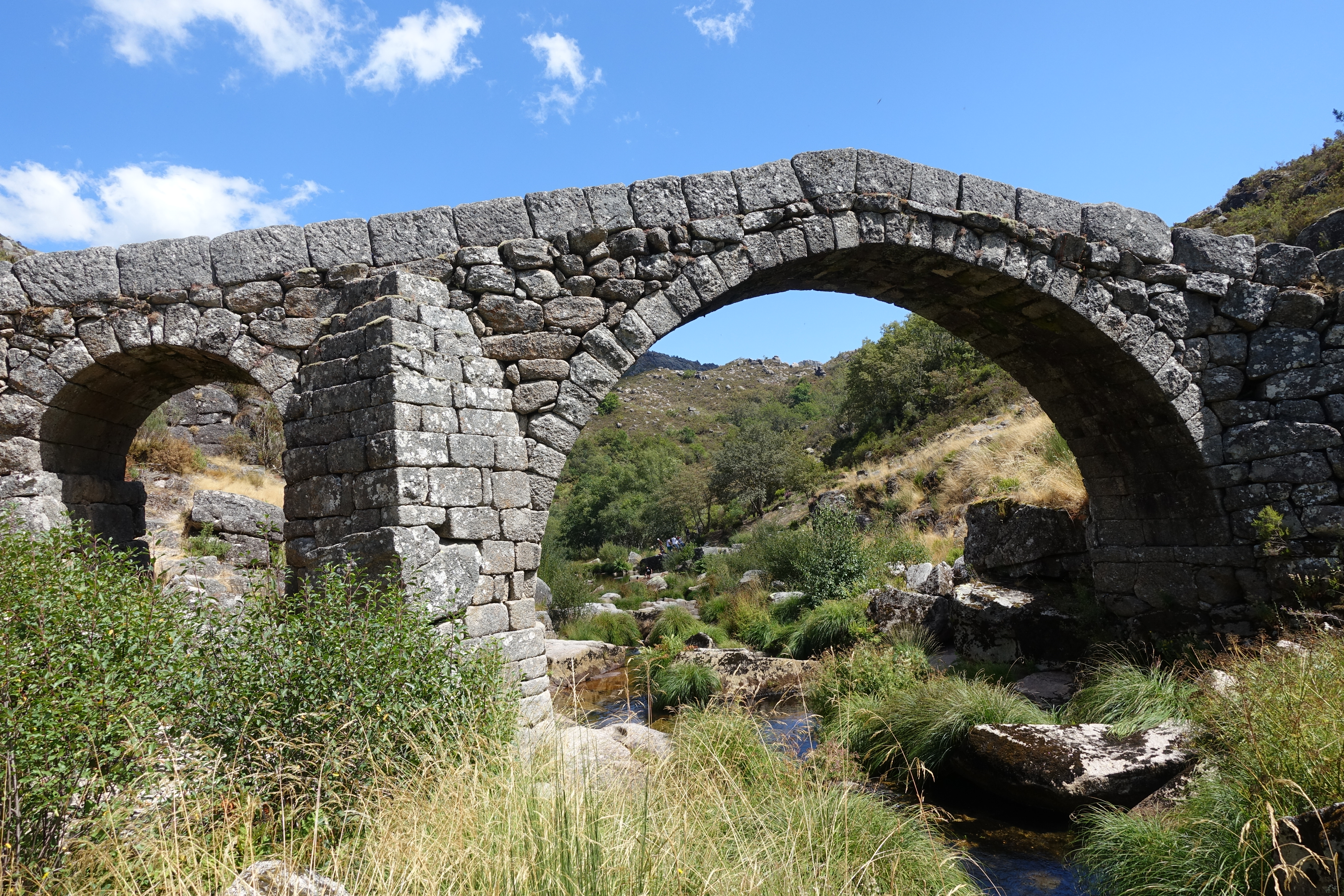
- A view of the Roman bridge from the River Laboeiro
- Coordinates: 42.003213°N 8.164024°W
- Locale: Portugal Melgaço, Castro Laboreiro e Lamas de Mouro
- Official name: Ponte Nova/Ponte da Cava da Velha
- Heritage status: National Monuments; Monumento Nacional; Decree 1/86, Diário da Repúblic, Série 1, 2 (3 January 1986); Included in the Parque Nacional da Peneda do Gerês

Characteristics
- Material: Granite

History
- Opened: 1st century

The Bridge of Cava da Velha (Portuguese: Ponte Velha/Ponte da Cava da Velha) is a Roman bridge, situated in the civil parish of Castro Laboreiro e Lamas de Mouro, in the municipality of Melgaço in northern Portuguese district of Viana do Castelo.

== History ==
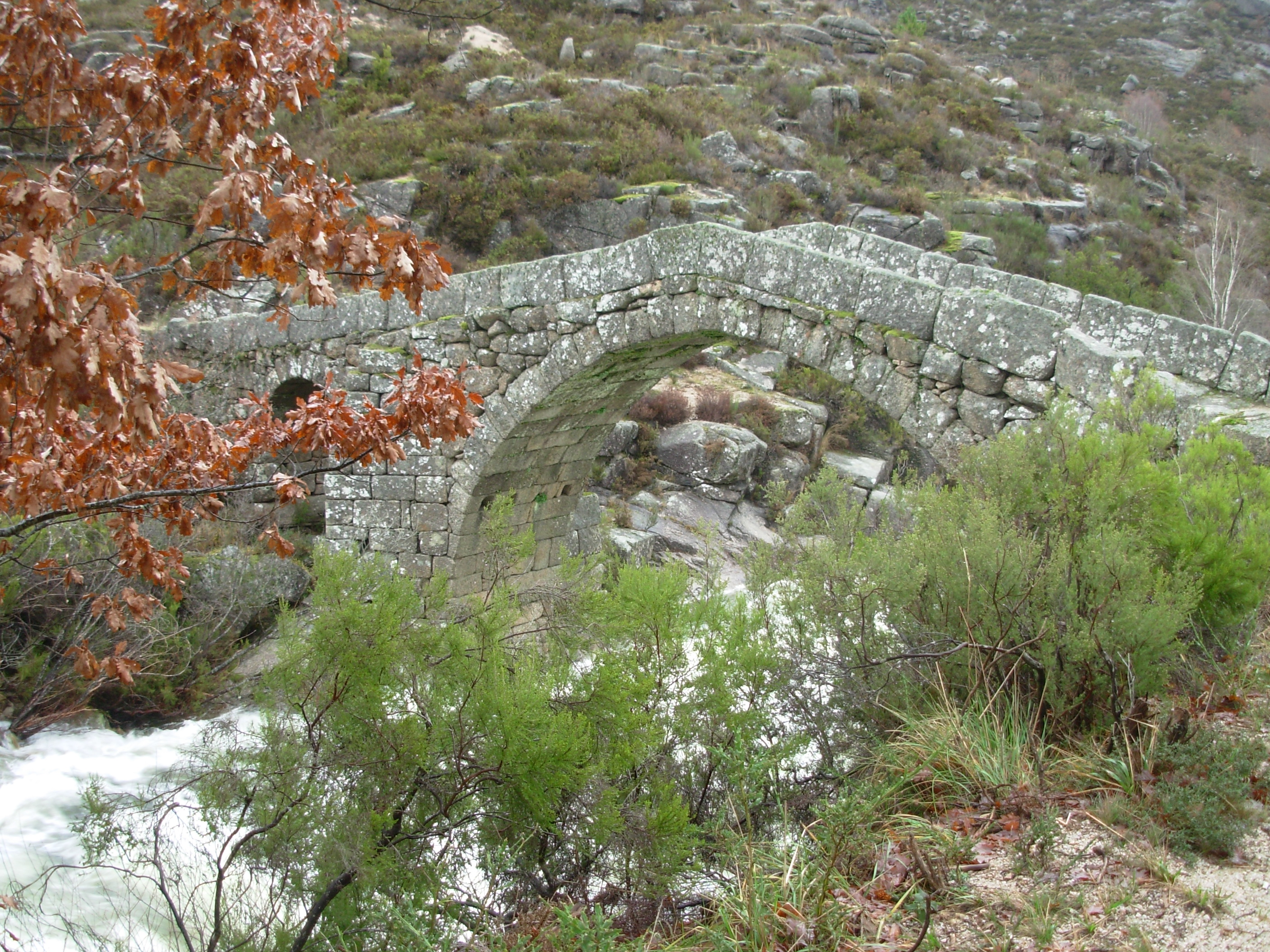
A view of the bridge from the north shore

The name Ponte Nova indicates the existence of another structure constructed in the same local (or nearby) at one time anteceding the current bridge. This may actually be the nearby Ponte de São Brás or Ponta da Assureira.

The bridge linked the Roman road to Espanha through Portela do Homem, passing through Estrimo (in Spain), Ameixoeira, Porto do Vaga and Assureira - Cova da Velha - Varziela - Castro Laboreiro. The bridge was largely constructed in the 1st century, but does not appear in the two most comprehensive lists of Roman bridges.

During the Middle Ages, the bridge was reconstructed to take on its current form.

On 11 May 1758, there was a reference to the bridge, alongside the bridge of São Brás (or Assureira) by the priest Inácio Ribeiro Marques in the parish Memórias Paroquiais.

== Architecture ==
The bridge is situated in an isolated, rural area within the Nature Park of Peneda do Gerês, 110 metres (360 ft) east of the municipal roadway over the River Laboreiro, 3 kilometres (1.9 mi) from Castro Laboreiro. A bucolic location links riverbank between two Roman-era pavements, that is located 200 metres (660 ft) from the Bridge of Assureira and Chapel of São Brás. The ramp arches are supported on the granite margins.

The bridge has an accentuated ramp oriented north to south, preceded by curve on either margin, over two differentiated arches, the larger 10.6 metres (35 ft) and 7.7 metres (25 ft) high and the smaller 1.7 metres (5.6 ft) and 3.3 metres (11 ft) high, with regular staves.

The structure, in irregular stone, has supported by worked ashlar with joints filled by smaller stones horizontally. Between the arches are prismatic starling upstream, and rectangular buttresses downstream. On the bottom of the arches are holes to fit the frame. The pavement is formed by large irregular slabs, protected by stone slab guards.

== See also ==
- List of Roman bridges
- List of bridges in Portugal
