= List of extreme temperatures in Portugal =

The following list presents the official temperature extremes recorded in Portugal by the Portuguese meteorological institute (IPMA) in official WMO stations.

== Highest Temperatures Recorded ==
Locations where temperature has reached or surpassed 46.0 °C (114.8 °F)

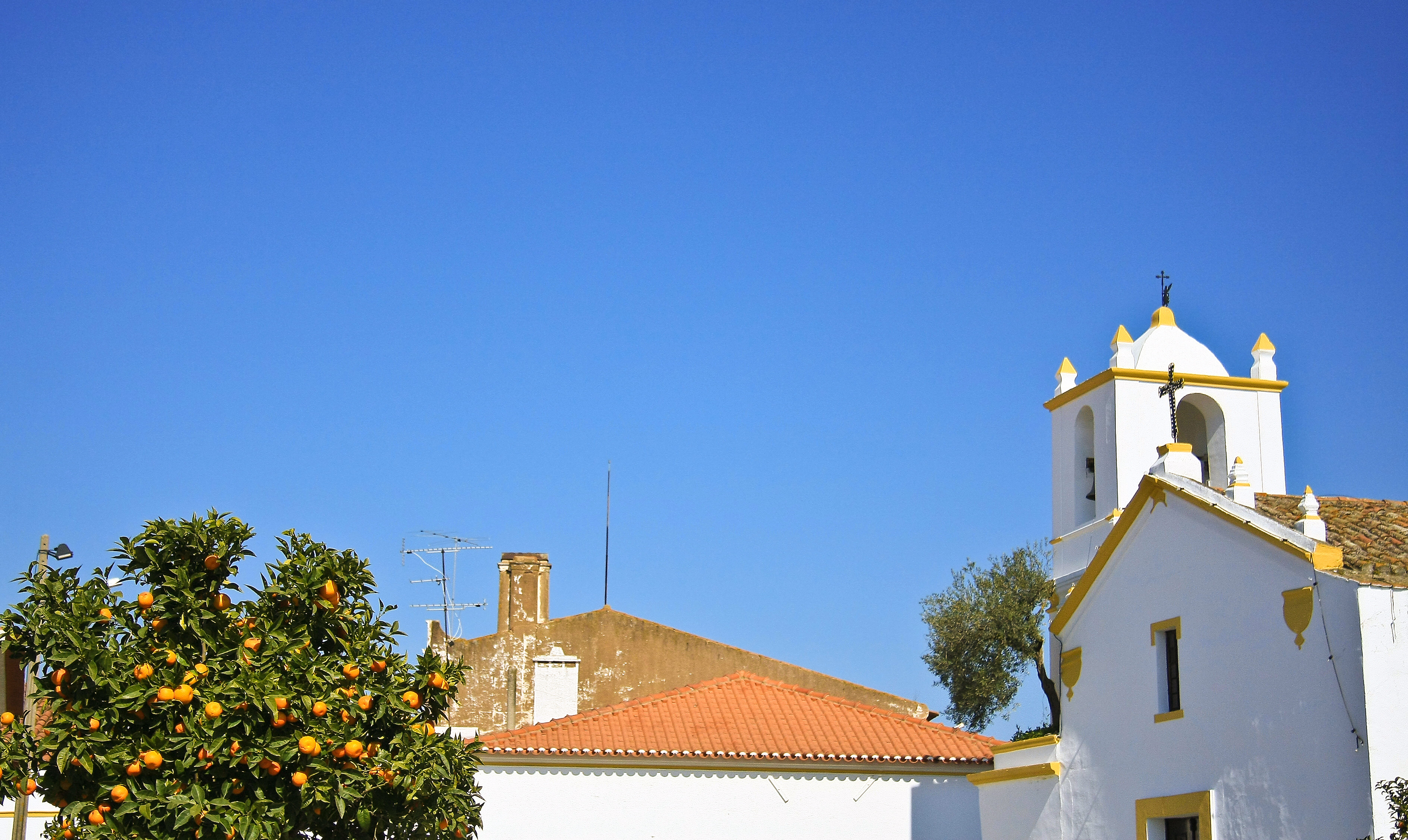
Amareleja holds the record for the highest temperature recorded in Portugal at 47.4 °C (117.3 °F)

Temperature	Location	Date Recorded
47.4 °C (117.3 °F)	Amareleja	1 August 2003
47.0 °C (116.6 °F)	Pinhão	14 July 2022
47.0 °C (116.6 °F)	Viana do Alentejo	1 August 2003
46.8 °C (116.2 °F)	Alvega	4 August 2018
46.6 °C (115.9 °F)	Mora	29 June 2025
46.5 °C (115.7 °F)	Amareleja	23 July 1995
46.4 °C (115.5 °F)	Santarém	7 August 2023
46.3 °C (115.3 °F)	Santarém	4 August 2018
46.3 °C (115.3 °F)	Lousã	13 July 2022
46.2 °C (115.2 °F)	Alcácer do Sal	4 August 2018
46.2 °C (115.2 °F)	Amareleja	13 July 2017
46.2 °C (115.2 °F)	Santarém	13 July 2022
46.1 °C (115.0 °F)	Coruche	4 August 2018
46.0 °C (114.8 °F) (Note: In the same day, the lowest temperature recorded in Alvega was 17.2 °C (63.0 °F) resulting in a night-to-day temperature difference of 28.8°C)	Alvega	29 June 2025
46.0 °C (114.8 °F)	Pegões	4 August 2018
45.9 °C (114.6 °F)	Alcácer do Sal	3 August 2018
45.8 °C (114.4 °F)	Castro Verde (Neves-Corvo)	4 August 2018
45.8 °C (114.4 °F)	Elvas	13 July 2017
45.8 °C (114.4 °F)	Reguengos de Monsaraz	13 July 2017
45.7 °C (114.3 °F)	Mora	2 August 2018
45.7 °C (114.3 °F)	Castro Verde (Neves-Corvo)	1 August 2018
45.7 °C (114.3 °F)	Alvega	14 July 2022
45.6 °C (114.1 °F)	Castro Verde (Neves-Corvo)	13 July 2017
45.6 °C (114.1 °F)	Amareleja	13 July 2022
45.5 °C (113.9 °F)	Setúbal	4 August 2018
45.5 °C (113.9 °F)	Reguengos de Monsaraz	3 August 2018
45.4 °C (113.7 °F)	Évora	4 August 2018
45.4 °C (113.7 °F)	Beja	1 August 2003
45.4 °C (113.7 °F)	Tomar	4 August 2018
45.4 °C (113.7 °F)	Avis	4 August 2018
45.4 °C (113.7 °F)	Portel	13 July 2017
45.4 °C (113.7 °F)	Mora	13 July 2022
45.4 °C (113.7 °F)	Pinhão	15 July 2022
45.3 °C (113.5 °F)	Amareleja	4 August 2018
45.3 °C (113.5 °F)	Santarém	31 July 1944
45.2 °C (113.4 °F)	Viana do Alentejo	2 August 2018
45.2 °C (113.4 °F)	Portel	4 August 2018
45.2 °C (113.4 °F)	Santarém	1 August 2003
45.2 °C (113.4 °F)	Beja	24 July 1995
45.2 °C (113.4 °F)	Avis	1 August 2003
45.2 °C (113.4 °F)	Mirandela	14 July 2022
45.1 °C (113.2 °F)	Elvas	3 August 2018
45.1 °C (113.2 °F)	Alvalade	23 July 1995
45.0 °C (113.0 °F)	Mértola	23 July 1995
45.0 °C (113.0 °F)	Lousã	7 September 2016
45.0 °C (113.0 °F)	Alcácer do Sal	23 July 1995
45.0 °C (113.0 °F)	Viana do Alentejo	18 July 1991

== Lowest Temperatures Recorded ==
Locations where temperature has fell at or under −12.0 °C (10.4 °F)
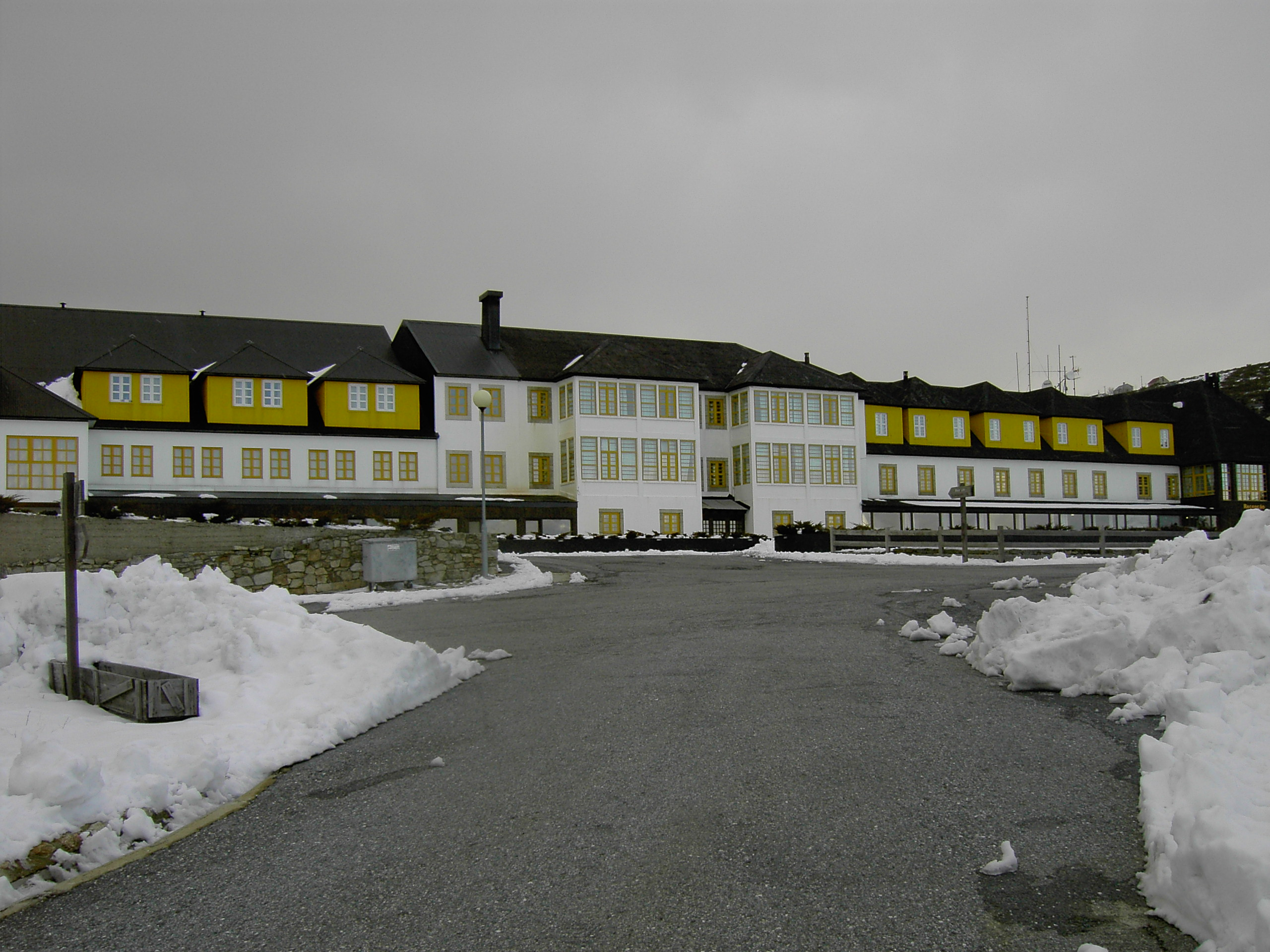
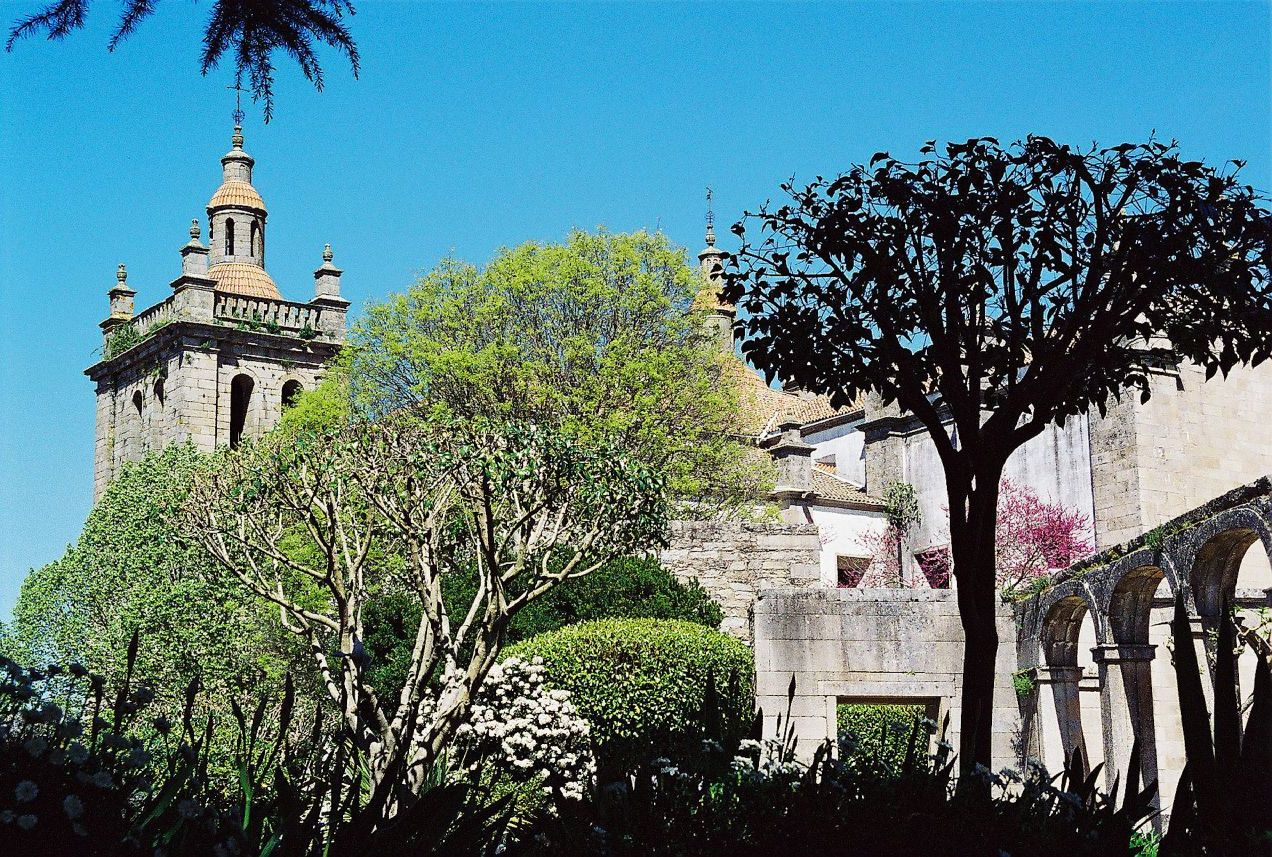
Both Penhas da Saúde and Miranda do Douro hold the record for the lowest temperature recorded in Portugal, −16.0 °C (3.2 °F)

Temperature	Location	Date Recorded
−16.0 °C (3.2 °F)	Penhas da Saúde	5 February 1954
−16.0 °C (3.2 °F)	Miranda do Douro	6 January 1945
−13.8 °C (7.2 °F)	Lamas de Mouro	Unknown
−13.3 °C (8.1 °F)	Penhas Douradas	11 February 1956
−13.2 °C (8.2 °F)	Miranda do Douro	7 March 1995
−12.9 °C (8.8 °F)	Penhas Douradas	1 March 2005
−12.6 °C (9.3 °F)	Figueira de Castelo Rodrigo	12 January 1967
−12.3 °C (9.9 °F)	Miranda do Douro	4 January 1971
−12.3 °C (9.9 °F)	Guarda*	11 February 1956
−12.0 °C (10.4 °F)	Bragança	16 January 1945
−12.0 °C (10.4 °F)	Figueira de Castelo Rodrigo	12 February 1983
−11.8 °C (10.8 °F)	Carrazeda de Ansiães	12 February 1983
−11.6 °C (11.1 °F)	Montalegre	5 February 1954
−11.6 °C (11.1 °F)	Miranda do Douro	12 February 1983
−11.6 °C (11.1 °F)	Bragança	12 February 1983
−11.4 °C (11.5 °F)	Bragança	4 January 1972
−11.2 °C (11.8 °F)	Penhas Douradas	14 January 1987
−10.9 °C (12.4 °F)	Mirandela	18 November 2007
−10.8 °C (12.6 °F)	Guarda	12 January 1985
−10.4 °C (13.3 °F)	Bragança	2 March 2005
−10.2 °C (13.6 °F)	Guarda	1 March 2005
−10.2 °C (13.6 °F)	Penhas Douradas	1 March 1993
−10.0 °C (14.0 °F)	Penhas Douradas	11 February 1978
−9.9 °C (14.2 °F)	Sabugal	19 January 2017
−9.8 °C (14.4 °F)	Mirandela	1 November 1982
−9.8 °C (14.4 °F)	Mora	8 November 1997
−9.8 °C (14.4 °F)	Montalegre	31 January 1954
−9.5 °C (14.9 °F)	Sabugal	20 December 2019
−9.5 °C (14.9 °F)	Carrazeda de Ansiães	9 January 1985
−9.5 °C (14.9 °F)	Montalegre	1 January 1971
−9.5 °C (14.9 °F)	Viseu*	14 November 1927
−9.5 °C (14.9 °F)	Montalegre	14 February 1983
−9.2 °C (15.4 °F)	Penhas Douradas	28 February 2005
−9.0 °C (15.8 °F)	Mora	23 January 2000
−8.8 °C (16.2 °F)	Penhas Douradas	27 January 2005
−8.8 °C (16.2 °F)	Guarda	6 March 1971
−8.7 °C (16.3 °F)	Miranda do Douro	11 January 2021
−8.6 °C (16.5 °F)	Coruche	19 January 2017
−8.6 °C (16.5 °F)	Lamas de Mouro	26 January 2017
−8.6 °C (16.5 °F)	Penhas Douradas	8 January 2009
−8.6 °C (16.5 °F)	Lamas de Mouro	24 February 2018
−8.5 °C (16.7 °F)	Penhas Douradas	13 February 2010
−8.5 °C (16.7 °F)	Chaves	22 January 1983
−8.5 °C (16.7 °F)	Bragança	18 November 2007
−8.5 °C (16.7 °F)	Bragança	9 January 2009
−8.4 °C (16.9 °F)	Guarda	19 January 2017
−8.4 °C (16.9 °F)	Alvalade	28 January 2005
−8.3 °C (17.1 °F)	Miranda do Douro	2 December 2017
−8.3 °C (17.1 °F)	Chaves	8 January 2021
−8.3 °C (17.1 °F)	Aljezur	28 January 2005
−8.3 °C (17.1 °F)	Alvalade	28 January 2005
−8.3 °C (17.1 °F)	Mirandela	4 February 2012
−8.2 °C (17.2 °F)	Chaves	4 February 2012
−8.2 °C (17.2 °F)	Bragança	17 December 2010
−8.1 °C (17.4 °F)	Penhas Douradas	20 December 2009
−8.1 °C (17.4 °F)	Bragança	20 December 2009
−8.1 °C (17.4 °F)	Chaves	19 January 2017
−8.1 °C (17.4 °F)	Fundão	18 February 1981
−8.0 °C (17.6 °F)	Mirandela	12 February 1983
−8.0 °C (17.6 °F)	Mira	17 January 1960
−8.0 °C (17.6 °F)	Ladoeiro	6 January 1997
−8.0 °C (17.6 °F)	Carrazeda de Ansiães	22 December 1990
−8.0 °C (17.6 °F)	Chaves	30 December 1980
−8.0 °C (17.6 °F)	Portalegre*	11 January 1941
−7.9 °C (17.8 °F)	Tomar	19 January 2017
−7.9 °C (17.8 °F)	Sabugal	4 February 2012
−7.8 °C (18.0 °F)	Coimbra*	31 December 1941
−7.7 °C (18.1 °F)	Carrazeda de Ansiães	11 and 17 January 2021
−7.7 °C (18.1 °F)	Figueira de Castelo Rodrigo	1 January 2017
−7.7 °C (18.1 °F)	Mirandela	14 January 1985
−7.7 °C (18.1 °F)	Chaves	14 February 1983
−7.7 °C (18.1 °F)	Miranda do Douro	28 November 2008
−7.5 °C (18.5 °F)	Guarda	23 November 1988
−7.5 °C (18.5 °F)	Bragança	5 January 2021
−7.5 °C (18.5 °F)	Lamas de Mouro	16 January 2021
−7.5 °C (18.5 °F)	Alvega	10 February 2012
−7.5 °C (18.5 °F)	Mirandela	30 January 2022
−7.5 °C (18.5 °F)	Ladoeiro	6 December 1998

(*) Stations created prior to 1941 and no longer in use
