= Ponte das Caínheiras =

Bridge of Caínheiras Ponte das Caínheiras
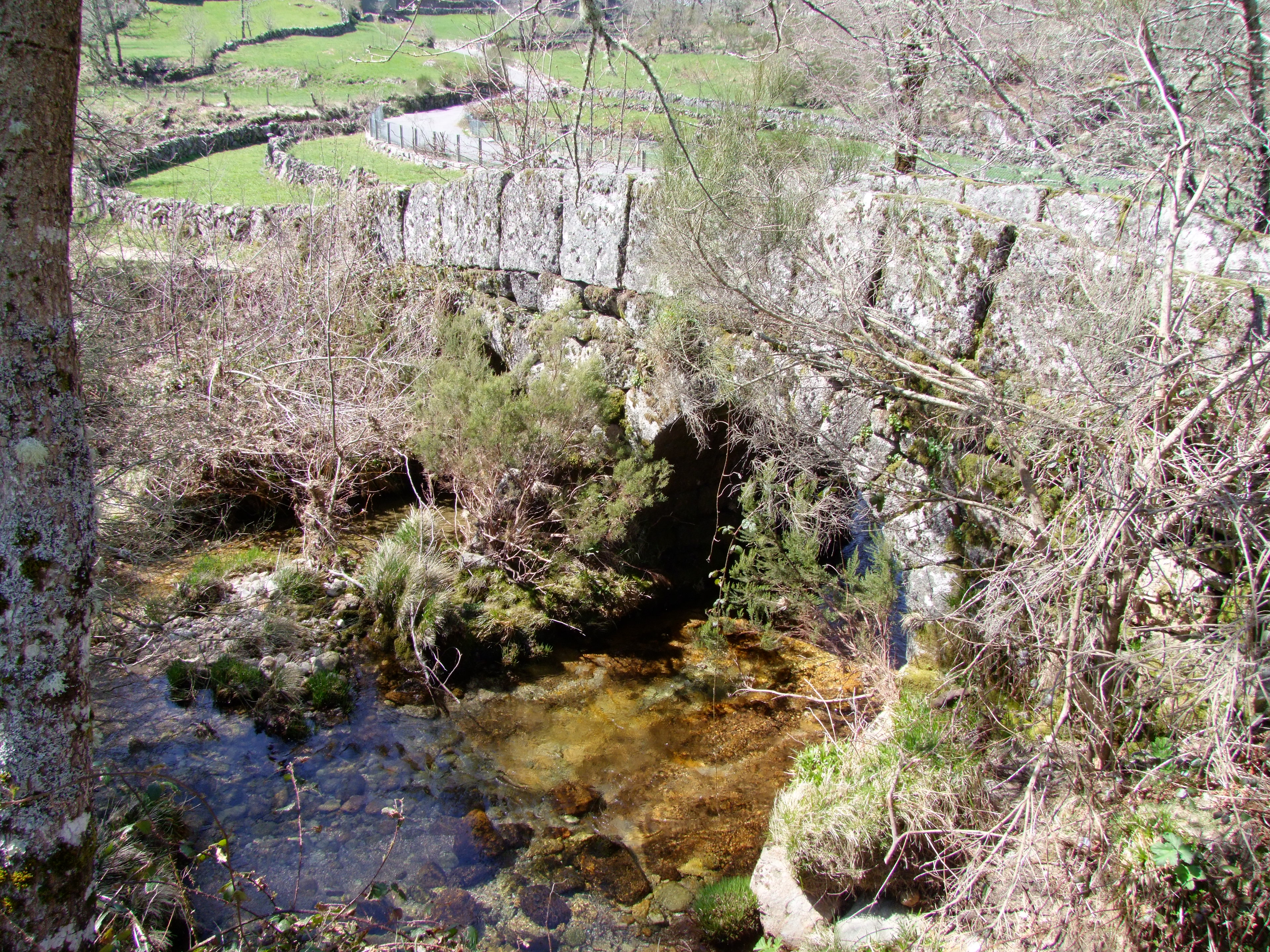
- View of the small Romanesque bridge over the Rio das Caínheiras
- Coordinates: 42.025665°N 8.138821°W
- Carries: Vehicles and Pedestrians
- Crosses: Rio das Caínheiras
- Locale: Portugal Melgaço, Castro Laboreiro e Lamas de Mouro
- Official name: Ponte sobre o Rio das Caínheiras
- Other name(s): O Diabo
- Heritage status: Property of Public Interest

Characteristics
- Material: Granite

Ponte das Caínheiras is a masonry bridge in the civil parish of Castro Laboreiro e Lamas de Mouro, municipality of Melgaço, in the district of Viana do Castelo, on the narrow traffic area over the Rio das Caínheiras.

Locals often refer to the bridge as "O Diabo" (The Devil) owing to the frequent traffic tie-ups attempting to cross it.

== History ==
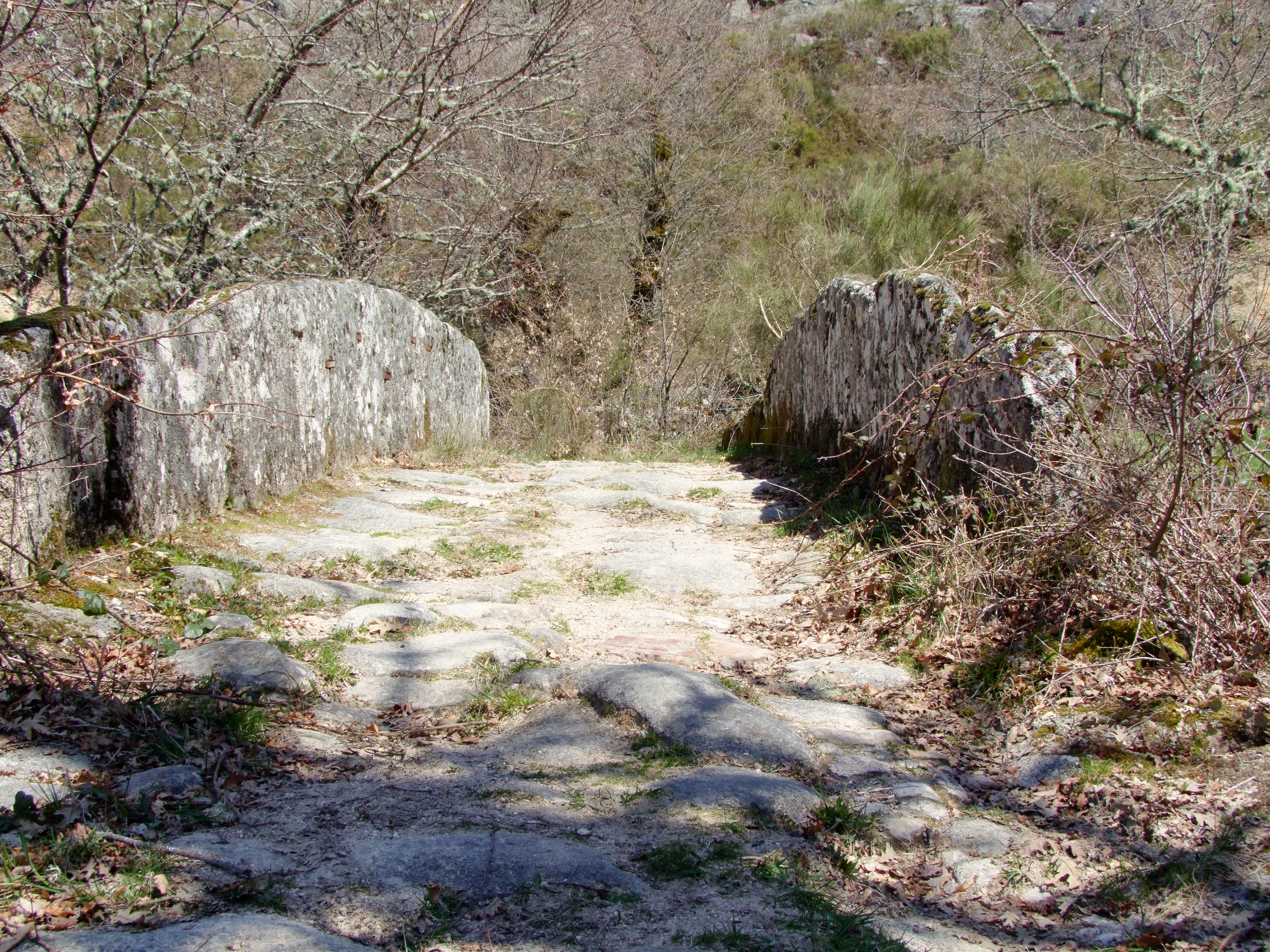
Dense vegetation overcrowding the small bridge

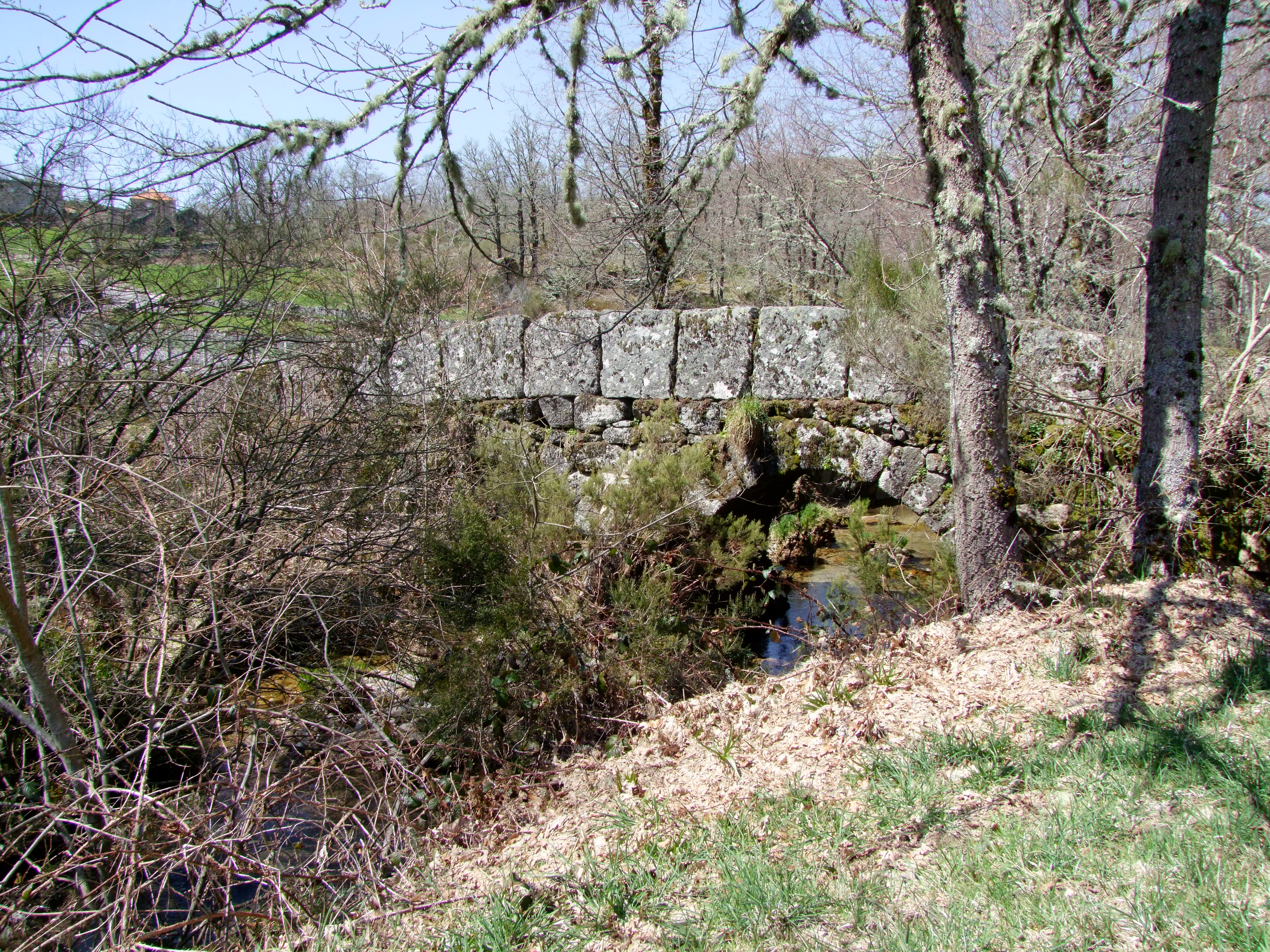
A view of the Rio das Caínheiras over the bridge

The first reference to the bridge occurred on 11 May 1758 by Father Inácio Ribeiro Marques, in the Memórias Paroquiais of the parish. It is likely that the bridge was constructed at the end of the 18th century or beginning of the 19th century.

== Architecture ==
The bridge is situated in a rural area harmoniously implanted within the Peneda-Gerês National Park. It is erected 160 metres (520 ft) northwest of the winter pasturelands of Cainheiras, over the river Cainheiras, at about 970 metres (3,180 ft) above cultivatable and forested lands. It is located some 2 kilometres (1.2 mi) from the chapel of Senhora da Boavista and 4 kilometres (2.5 mi) from the chapel of Senhora de Anamão. The bridge of Cainheiras is part of a network of vicinal roads south and east of Castro Laboreiro, in addition to the Minhoto-Galacia regional roadways that connected Castro Laboreiro with Melgaço, Arcos de Valdevez and Bande. Further, it connected Castro Laboreiro with Galicia to the east, in the direction of Celanova (through Portos and Seara) and south towards Entrimo and Lobios (through Ameixoeira).

It is an arched bridge, with soft incline, over two arcs with long, regular staves, reinforced by triangular cutwaters. On the ramp are large rectangular stone blocks that act as railing. It is proceeded by a gentle incline from a curvilinear bend in the road on both sides. The arches are slightly uneven with a 3 metres (9.8 ft) diameter, supported by long, regular staves. Between either arch are reinforcements: upstream, triangular cutwater and, downstream, rectangular struts. The ramp slabs are protected by guardrails formed by large blocks, reinforced by iron "staples".

== See also ==
- List of bridges in Portugal
