= Castle of Castro Laboreiro =

Castle in Viana do Castelo District, Portugal

Castle of Castro Laboreiro castle
- Castelo de Castro Laboreiro
- Viana do Castelo, Alto Minho, Norte in Portugal
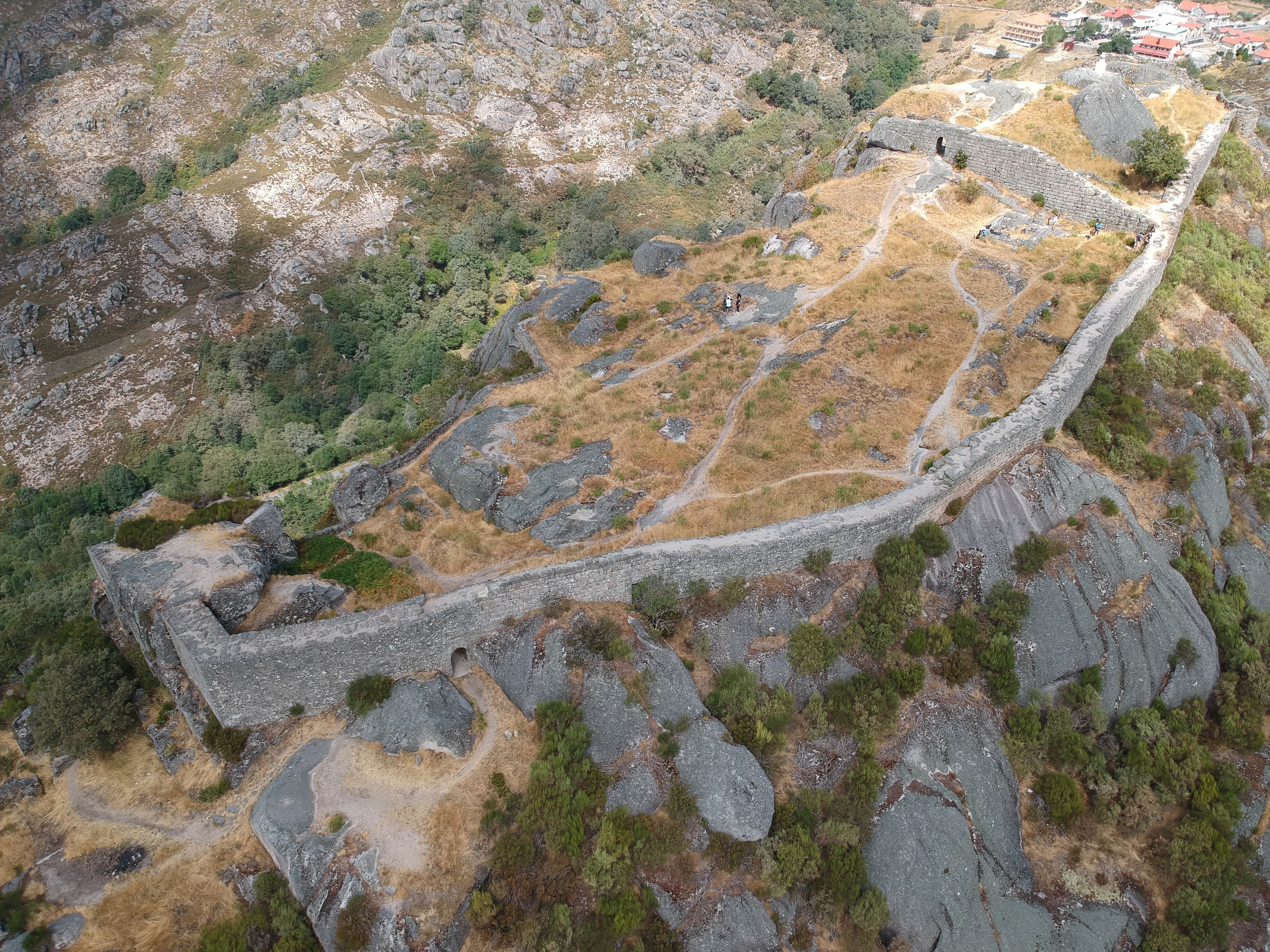
- Aerial photograph of Castro Laboreiro

Site information
- Type: Castle
- Owner: Portuguese Republic
- Open to the public: Public

Location
- Coordinates: 42°1′22.55″N 8°9′29.69″W

Site history
- Built: 9th century
- Materials: Granite

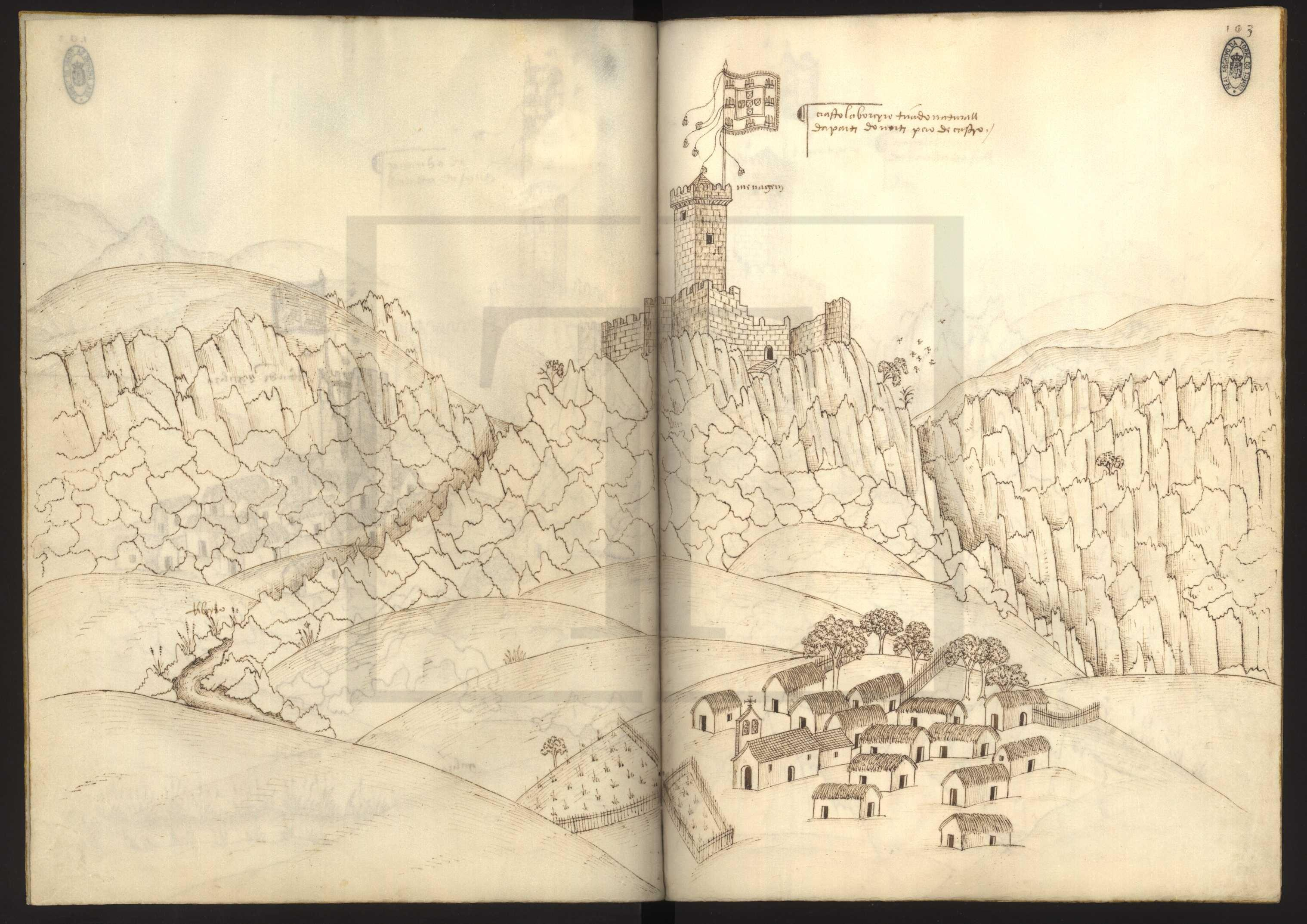
Castro Laboreiro around 1506 (Book of Fortresses)

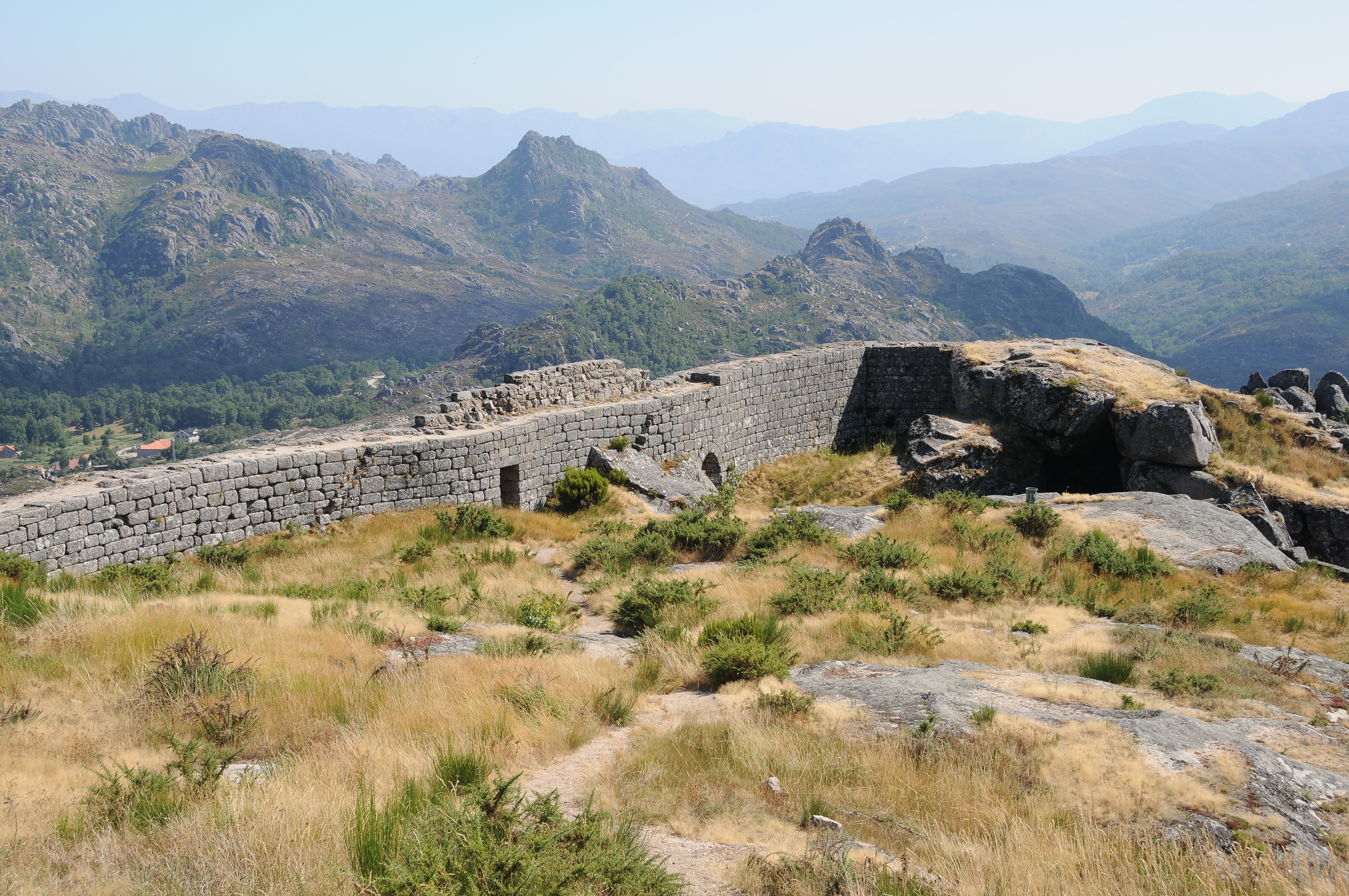
A panoramic view of the mountains from the strategic point of Castro Laboreiro

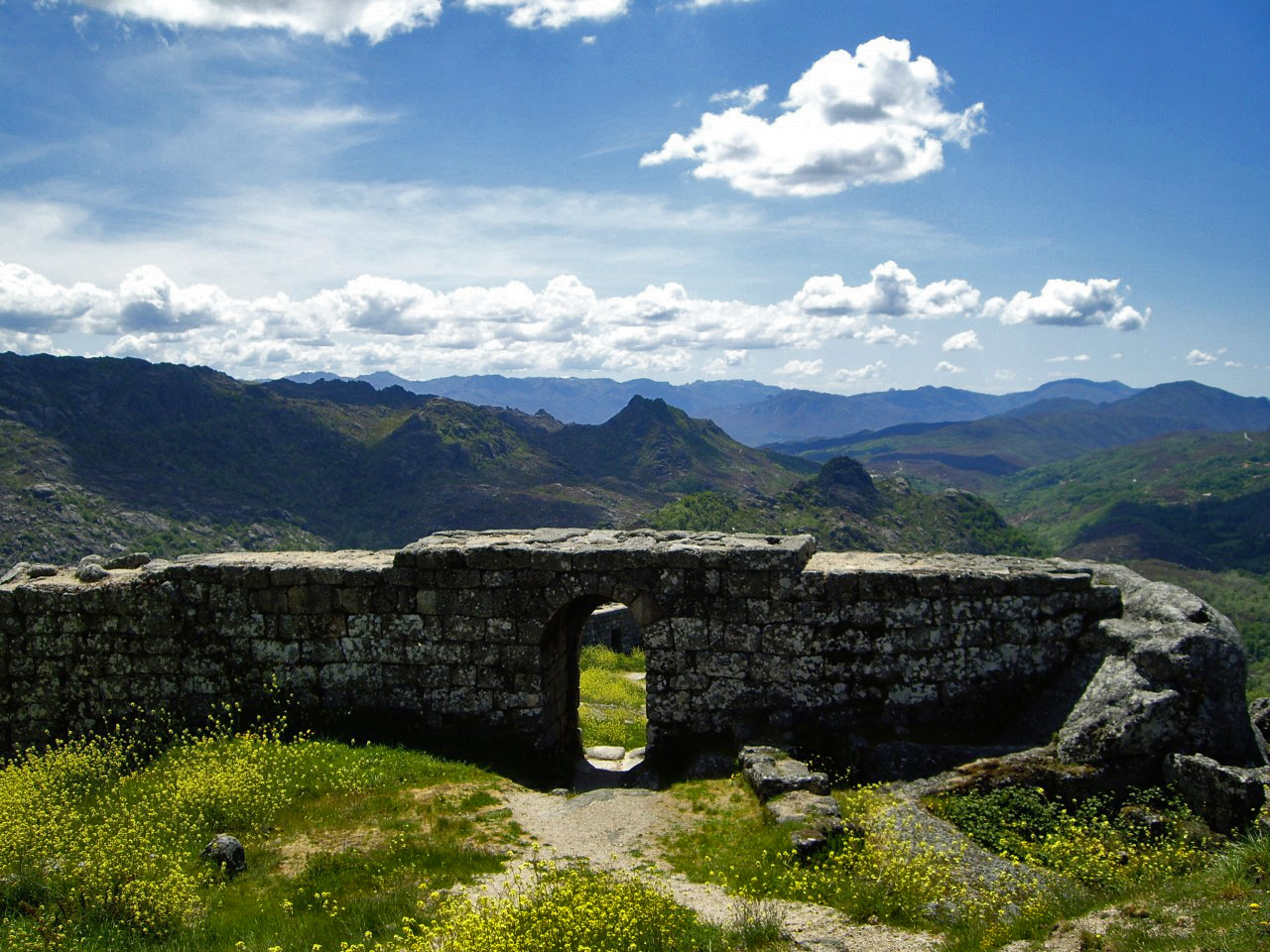
A perspective of the traitors' gate, or "Gate of the Frog"

The Castle of Castro Laboreiro (Portuguese: Castelo de Castro Laboreiro) is a Portuguese castle in civil parish of Castro Laboreiro, in the municipality of Melgaço. It is the ruins of a Romanesque castle with a belt of walls around a central keep with a cistern.

== History ==
In the 9th century, Alfonso III of Asturias, donated the settlement of Castro Laboreiro and the castro to Count Hermenegildo Gutiérrez, grandfather of Saint Rudesind, for his defeat of a rebel called Witiza. During the reign of the Galician count, the castro was adapted to a castle, but would eventually fall into the possession of the Moors.

In 1144, Afonso Henriques reconquered the redoubt, and from 1145 his forces began the task of restoring and expanding the defenses: it was Sancho I of Portugal who finally completed the project in the 12th century. The efforts were for not, as the Leonese raised the castle in 1212, during their invasion. In 1290, Denis of Portugal began the reconstruction, with emphasis on defense from its neighbors.

For many years Gomes de Abreu, of Merufe, was the alcalde of Laboreiro, and in 1375, King Fernando gave the alcaderia to Estevão Anes Marinho.

Following the conquest of Melgaço in the 14th century, King John used Castro Laboreiro to restrain various Castilian incursions from Galicia.

In 1441, the alcalde, Martim de Castro, was removed owing to protest from its residents.

From the drawings of Duarte das Armas around 1506, the castle had five rectangular towers surrounding the central keep, which was preceded by the cistern in the north. Another, unidentified, construction was erected to the south.

In a surprise attack, Baltazar Pantoja took the castle after four hours of skirmishes in May 1666. He left Governor Pedro Esteves Ricarte in charge of the citadel, until it was retaken by the 3rd Count of Prado, Francisco de Sousa.

The King, citing its historical importance, decided to conserve the castle, against the opinion of Michel Lescole. Following the restoration of peace, in 1715, the castle was decommissioned.

From 1746 to 1779, the Governor of Castro Laboreiro was Manuel de Araújo Machado, Count of Bobadela. Then Governor-at-Arms for the Province, he ordered the arrest at the castle of 400 men and women who had refused to present their children for military service in 1766-1778.

In 1801, troops occupied and defended the castle using four military pieces.

It has been listed as a National monument since 1944, with the first projects to maintain and restore the castle beginning in 1979, resulting in the re-pavement of the roadways and the removal of vegetation and landscaping.

In 2005, the municipal council improved the access to the castle.

== Architecture ==
The castle is located on an isolated hilltop 1,033 metres (3,389 ft) above the Minho and Lima Rivers. It has an oval plan, oriented north-south, with the remains of the walls erected over cliffs and crags, sometimes zig-zagging, which corresponded to the ancient towers.

The principal entrance is the Gate of the Sun (Portuguese: Porta do Sol) which opens to the east, while the "traitors' gate", the Gate of the Frog (Portuguese: Porta do Sapo) as it was known, in the north. The east-west courtyard is closed and accessible from a footbridge that was used to gather cattle and property during invasions. It is around these walls that ruins of the ancient cistern remain.

== See also ==
- Castle of Penedono
- Castle of Santo Estêvão
