= Pillory of Braga =

- Pelourinho de Braga
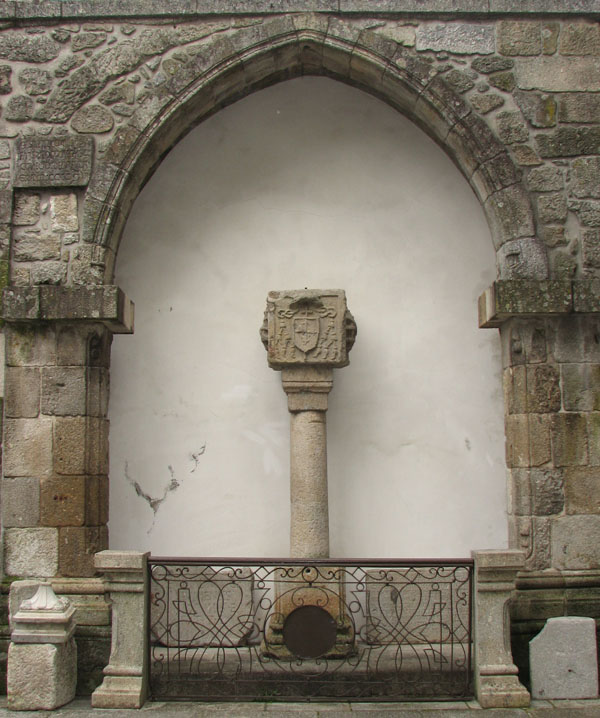
- The pillory, as it is located within the Sé Cathedral
- Interactive map of the Pillory of Braga area

General information
- Type: Pillory
- Architectural style: Manueline
- Location: Braga (Maximinos, Sé e Cividade), Braga, Portugal
- Coordinates: 41°33′1.06″N 8°25′36.47″W
- Owner: Portuguese Republic

Technical details
- Material: Granite

The Pillory of Braga (Portuguese: Pelourinho de Braga) is a 15th-century sculpted stone column with symbolic political, administrative and judicial significance, located in the civil parish of Maximinos, Sé e Cividade, municipality of Braga.

== History ==
Braga was offered by Afonso VI of Castille to his daughter D. Teresa as part of his wedding dowery, at her marriage to Henry of Burgundy, who was made Count of Portucale, in 1094. The great masters of the town, the principal economic benefactors were then the bishops and archbishops. Around 1070, D. Pedro, first Bishop of Braga, reorganized the Diocese and began work on the great Sé Cathedral, which later progressed to the areas around it by the end of the century. At the beginning of the 16th century, Archbishop D. Diogo de Sousa broke the walls of Braga, constructing a new town, following his tastes for Renaissance architecture and thinking. Another his contemporaries, the Bracarense D. Friar Bartolomeu dos Mártires, whose coat-of-arms figures into the pillory of Braga also had an important hand in the development of the town.

Braga, therefore, became known as the Portuguese Rome or the City of the Archbishops, between the 15th and end of the 18th century, owing to the strong relationship between the city and the Church, which determined its administrative dependence during the centuries.

It is unfamiliar when the pillory was erected, but records show that it erected near the municipal palace (in front of the Sé Cathedral) sometime in the 15th century.

It was re-erected probably sometime in the 16th century, but demolished and relocated to the Campo de Santana (today the Avenida Central), in front of the 15th century arcades, through the initiative of residents, sometime in 1694.

Yet, but by 1750, the pillory was situated in the "awnings"/arcades of the Cathedral. This was also illustrated in an azulejo tile that exist in the municipal council hall. Júlio Rocha e Sousa indicates that the pillory was demolished, pointing to the fact that two pillories existed in the city, as opposed to Ataíde Malafaia, who indicated only one structure. In 1758, in the Memórias Paroquiais, penned by the parish priest at the Cathedral, Inácio de Palhares, the village of Braga consisted of 717 homes, that belonged to the archbishops of Braga.

Between 1834 and 1844, the pillory was relocated to the centre of the Campo de Touros or municipal square. On 20 July 1853, the pillory was demolished, with fragments of the structure collected and stored in the cloister of the cathedral, where they were eventually constructed in its location alongside a fountain.

== Architecture ==
The granite structure, consists of a column over three edge/step prismatic base. At the top is a rectangular capital, with a narrower base and square top, whose inscribed faces include armillary spheres, archiepiscopal and royal coat-of-arms.

Although tempting to see this as the same pillory erected in the 15th century, in front of the Cathedral and Municipal Palace, the decorations are typically Manueline in style/design. In this case, the episcopal coat-of-arms presented are those od D. Diogo de Sousa, who was archbishop in 1505, during the reign of D. Manuel, and chaplain to Queen D. Maria. This explains the presence of the coat-of-arms alongside the armillary sphere, a personal emblem of the monarch. Considering that the Episcopal coat-of-arms belonged to Friar Bartolomeu dos Mártires, Bishop from 1559, it can be assumed that the monument is far older.
