= Ponte de Varziela =

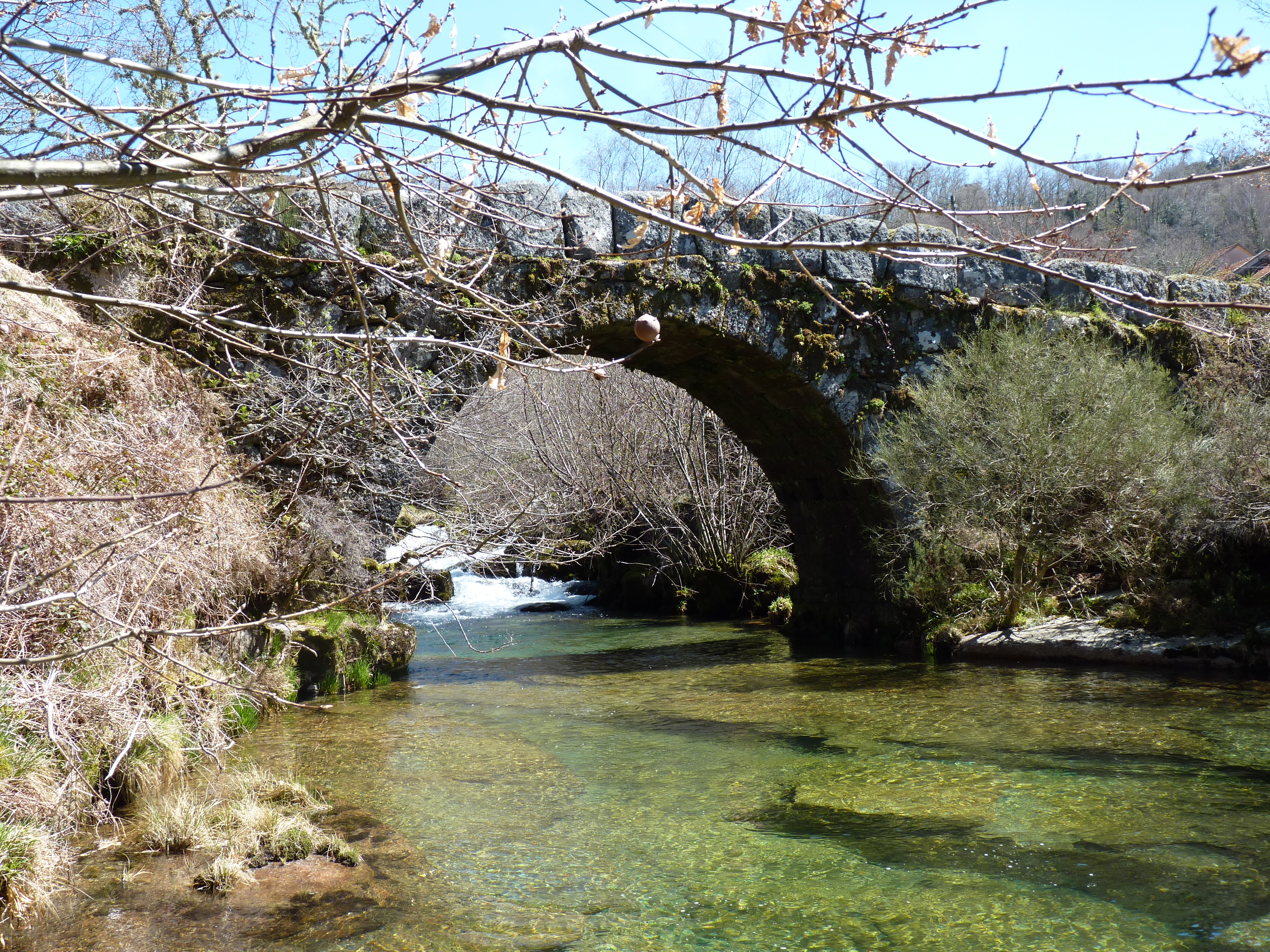
- Coordinates: 42°01′38″N 8°08′45″W
- Locale: Viana do Castelo District, Portugal

Location
- Interactive map of Ponte de Varziela

Ponte de Varziela is a bridge in Portugal. It is located in Castro Laboreiro, Viana do Castelo District.

== See also ==
- List of bridges in Portugal
