= Ponte de Dorna =

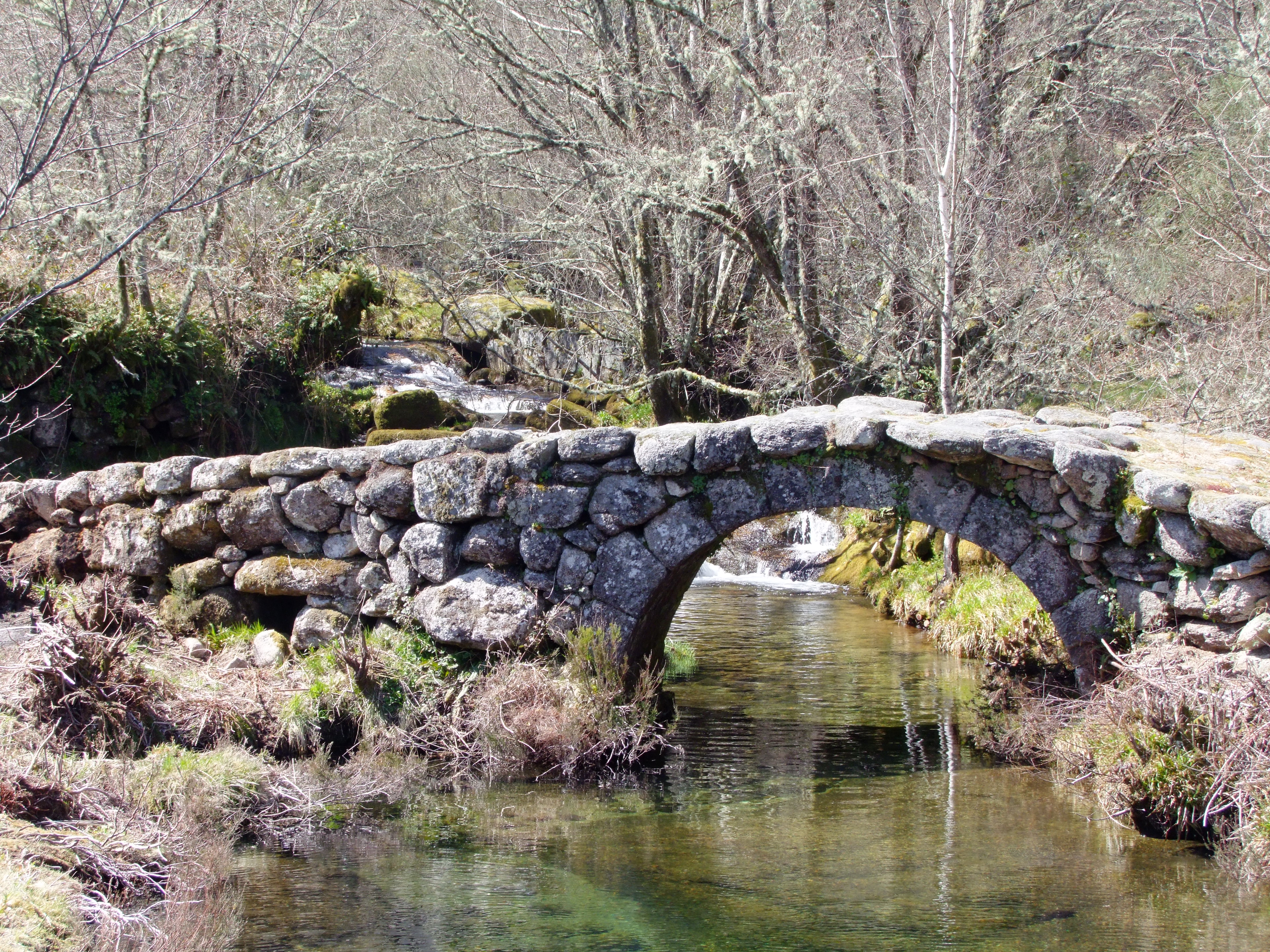
- Ponte de Dorna
- Coordinates: 41°59′39.45″N 8°10′3.67″W
- Locale: Viana do Castelo District, Portugal
- Heritage status: Imóvel de Interesse Público.

Location
- Interactive map of Ponte de Dorna

Ponte de Dorna is a bridge in Portugal. It is located in Castro Laboreiro, Viana do Castelo District.

== See also ==
- List of bridges in Portugal
