= Castro Laboreiro Dog =

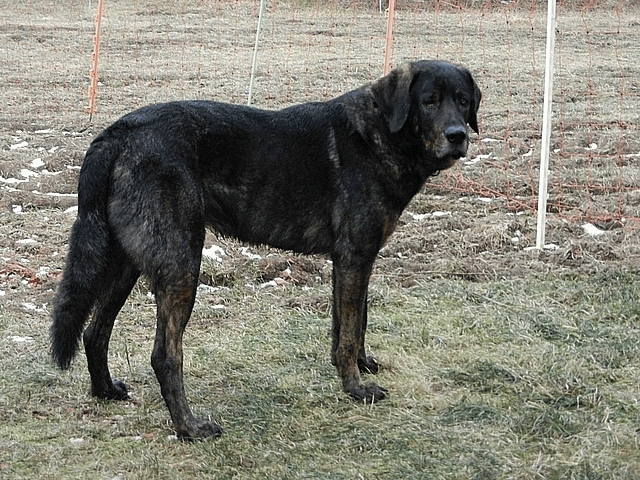
- A specimen with "dark wolf" coat
- Other names: Cão de Castro Laboreiro, Portuguese cattle dog, Portuguese watchdog
- Origin: Portugal
Kennel club standards
- Fédération Cynologique Internationale: standard

The Castro Laboreiro Dog (Portuguese: cão de Castro Laboreiro, 'dog of Castro Laboreiro'), also known as the Portuguese cattle dog or Portuguese watchdog, is a dog breed of the livestock guardian type, originating from Castro Laboreiro in the northern mountains of Portugal.

== History ==
The Portuguese name, meaning 'dog from Castro Laboreiro', refers to a small town in the far north of Portugal, now a parish in the Melgaço urban area. It is in the same mountains as the Peneda-Gerês National Park. Although now served by modern highways, the mountainous, rocky area was once quite remote. The modern breed is descended from a very old livestock guardians, which worked with livestock herders in the mountains, defending against wolves and other large predators.

The origin of the breed is not known, although many legends are given. The Portuguese breed club notes that "Everything that is written about their origins is pure fiction, without any scientific or historical accuracy ... data is rare, or does not exist ... most guardian and herding breeds do not have records before 1900".

There are mentions of the Castro Laboreiro in the 19th century but none before 1800. Camilo Castelo Branco in his novella A Brasileira de Prazins (1882) mentions "the dogs of Castro Laboreiro, very fierce ..."

Modern genetic studies have shown that the modern breed is unique from other similar breeds in Portugal.

It is said to be "ferocious against wolves."

With the eradication of wolves and other large predators the Castro Laboreiro Dog lost its original use. Changes in agricultural methods over the last hundred years led to many of these dogs being abandoned, turning feral and becoming a problem for those that raise cattle and horses.

Today, the breed has mostly been removed from its native range and purpose, and is kept as a companion and guard dog. It was first exhibited at a dog show in 1914, and the first written breed standard was by veterinarian Manuel Marques in 1935, when the breed was recognised by the Clube Portugues de Canicultura, the official Fédération Cynologique Internationale (FCI) kennel club for Portugal founded in 1897. The Castro Laboreiro Dog is recognised by the FCI in Group 2, Section 2.2: Mastiffs, Mountain Type, Portugal (breed number 150). It is also recognised, under its Portuguese name, by the United Kennel Club in the United States, in their Guardian dog group. It may also be listed under the name cão de Castro Laboreiro, similar-sounding names, or different English versions of the name (such as Portuguese cattle dog or Portuguese watchdog) by large commercial breeders, minor kennel clubs that require little to no breed verification for registration, and Internet-based dog registry businesses, where it is promoted as a rare breed for those seeking a fashionably novel or unique pet. Nevertheless, the number of specimens of this breed does not exceed 500 in the whole world. In Portugal, there are a half-dozen breeders, plus a couple more elsewhere in Europe (in United Kingdom and Germany), and one in the US.

== Appearance ==
The standardised appearance for which the Castro Laboreiro Dog has been bred is somewhat wolf-like in outline. It is a large dog, but not oversize. Height should not be above 60 cm (24 in) at the withers and weight should not be more than 40 kg (88 lbs); females somewhat smaller. Coat colours are often described in wolf terms: "dark wolf colour", "light wolf colour". Most breeders prefer what is considered the most authentic, called "mountain colour" (cor do monte), also described as similar to the coat of a wolf, but a mixed light and dark grey interspersed with individual hairs (not spots) that are brown (called "pine-seed") or dark red (called "mahogany"), forming overall a brindle pattern.

== Health issues ==
Health issues specific to the breed have not been documented. Dogs represented as Castro Laboreiros may be mixed with other breeds, which may have other genetic health problems. Puppy buyers should enquire of breeders about types of health testing done on the sire and dam; responsible breeders will be able to provide information. Being a "rare breed" does not guarantee immunity from inherited disease or disability.

== See also ==
- List of dog breeds
- Saint Miguel Cattle Dog (cão fila de São Miguel)
- Cão de Gado Transmontano
