= Homem =

Homem is a surname meaning "man" in Portuguese. Notable people with the surname include:

- Diogo Homem (1521–1576), Portuguese cartographer
- Guy-Manuel de Homem-Christo (born 1974), French musician, record producer, singer, songwriter, DJ, film director and composer
- Lopo Homem (c. 1497–c. 1572), Portuguese cartographer
