= Lamas de Mouro =

- Civil parish
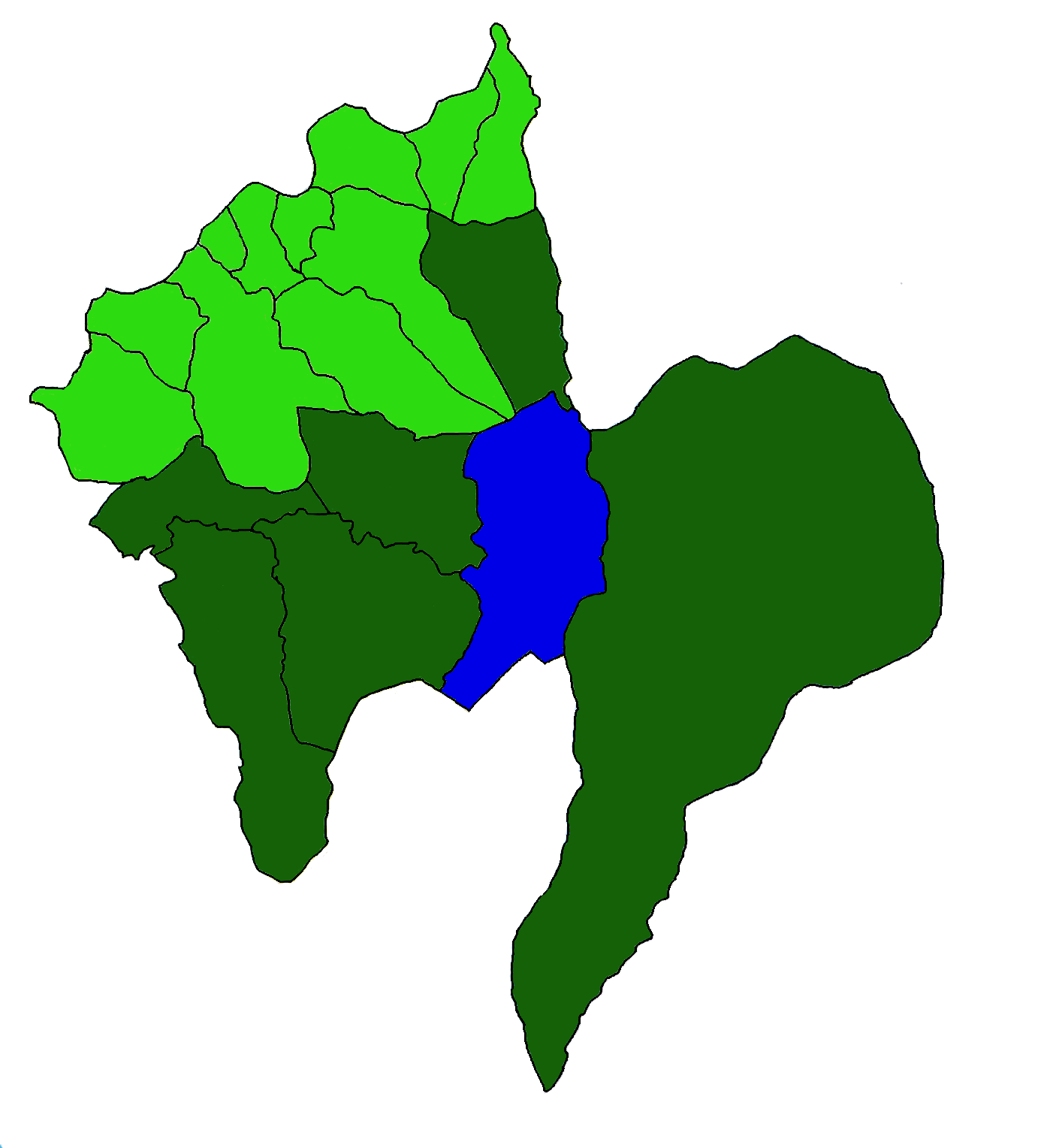
- Coordinates: 42°03′04″N 8°11′58″W
- Country: Portugal
- Region: Norte
- Intermunic. comm.: Alto Minho
- District: Viana do Castelo
- Municipality: Melgaço
- Disbanded: 2013

Area
  - Total: 17.31 km^{2} (6.68 sq mi)

Population
  - Total: 148
  - Density: 8.5/km^{2} (22/sq mi)
- Time zone: UTC+00:00 (WET)
  - Summer (DST): UTC+01:00 (WEST)

Lamas de Mouro is a former civil parish in the municipality of Melgaço in the Viana do Castelo District, Portugal. In 2013, the parish merged into the new parish Castro Laboreiro e Lamas de Mouro. It has a population of 148 inhabitants and a total area of 17.31 km^{2}.

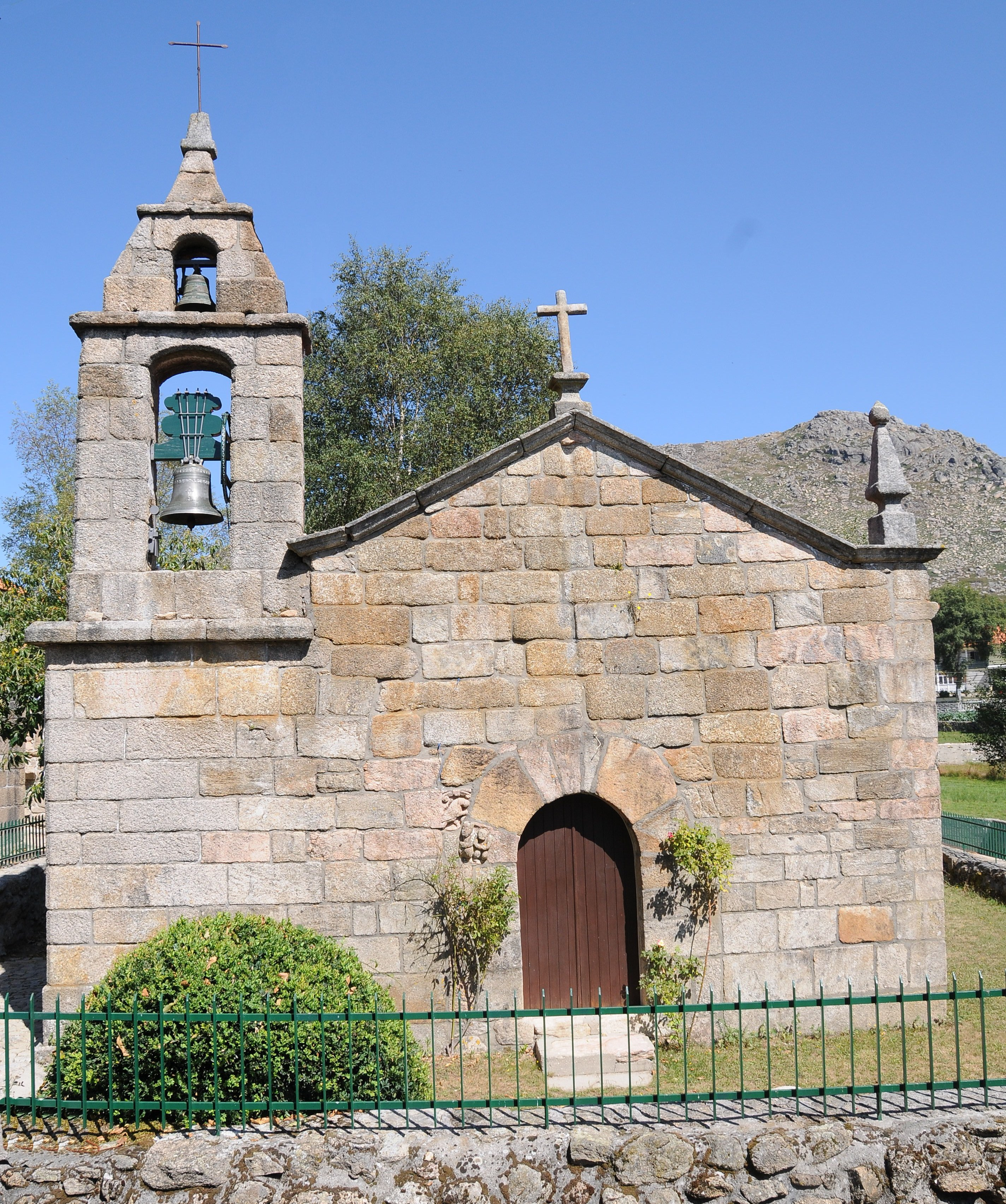
Lamas de Mouro Church

== Climate ==
Lamas de Mouro has a cool Mediterranean climate with significant oceanic influences. On average, it has the coldest summer nights out of any populated place in Portugal. Precipitation is high, averaging around 1,650 mm (65 in) per year.

Climate data for Lamas de Mouro, 1980-1990, altitude 880 m (2,890 ft)
Month	Jan	Feb	Mar	Apr	May	Jun	Jul	Aug	Sep	Oct	Nov	Dec	Year
Mean daily maximum °C (°F)	9.1 (48.4)	9.3 (48.7)	11.8 (53.2)	12.5 (54.5)	14.8 (58.6)	19.3 (66.7)	22.1 (71.8)	22.2 (72.0)	21.5 (70.7)	16.1 (61.0)	12.3 (54.1)	10.3 (50.5)	15.1 (59.2)
Daily mean °C (°F)	4.1 (39.4)	4.7 (40.5)	6.5 (43.7)	7.5 (45.5)	9.5 (49.1)	13.4 (56.1)	15.5 (59.9)	15.4 (59.7)	14.4 (57.9)	10.6 (51.1)	7.8 (46.0)	5.7 (42.3)	9.6 (49.3)
Mean daily minimum °C (°F)	−0.9 (30.4)	0.2 (32.4)	1.1 (34.0)	2.5 (36.5)	4.3 (39.7)	7.6 (45.7)	9.1 (48.4)	8.5 (47.3)	7.4 (45.3)	5.1 (41.2)	3.3 (37.9)	0.9 (33.6)	4.1 (39.4)
Average precipitation mm (inches)	228 (9.0)	200 (7.9)	161 (6.3)	122 (4.8)	124 (4.9)	58 (2.3)	26 (1.0)	38 (1.5)	90 (3.5)	168 (6.6)	204 (8.0)	231 (9.1)	1,650 (64.9)
Mean monthly sunshine hours	86	87	155	137	175	218	260	259	216	143	76	78	1,890
Source: IPMA
