= Manteigas =

- Municipality
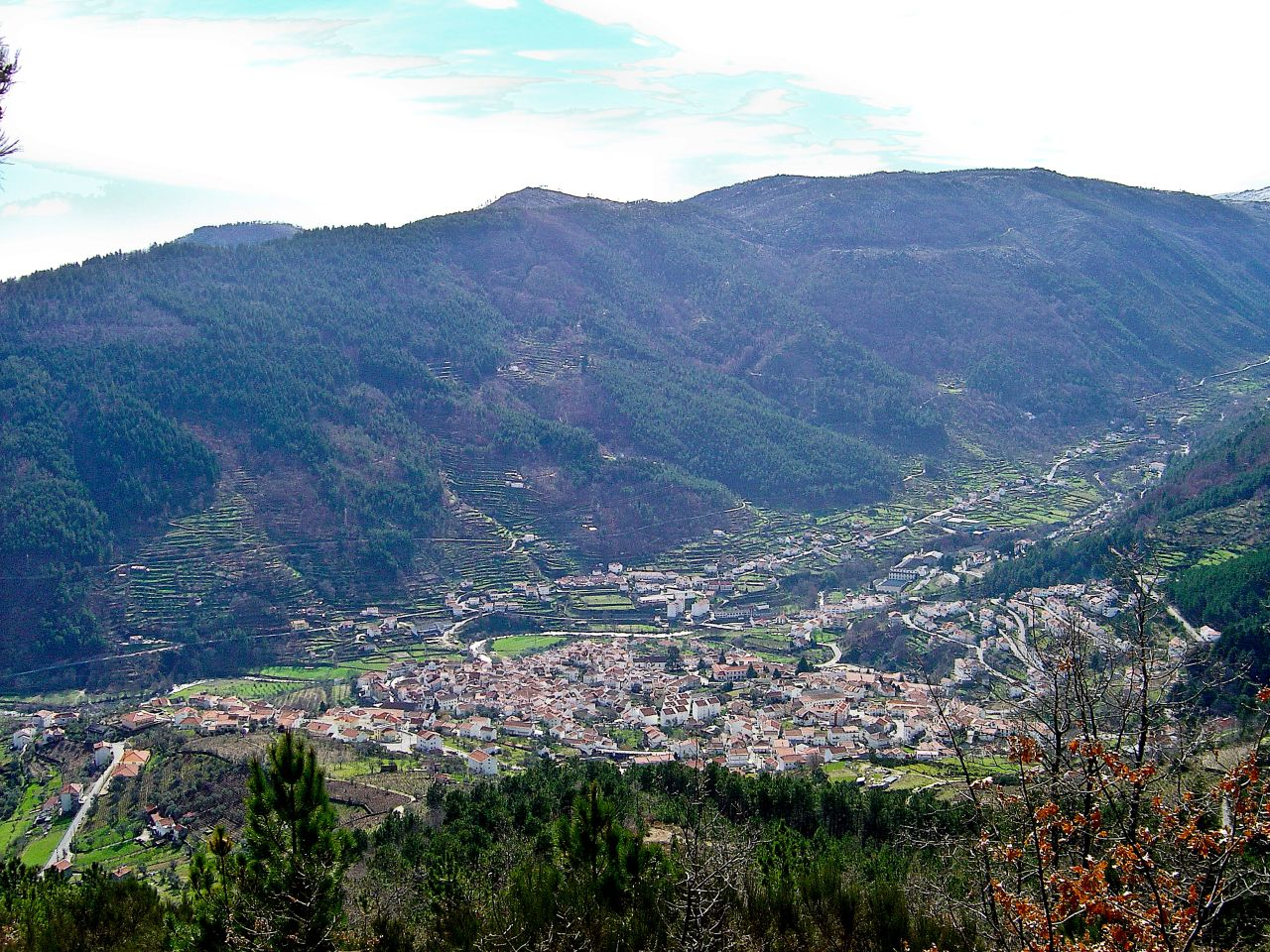

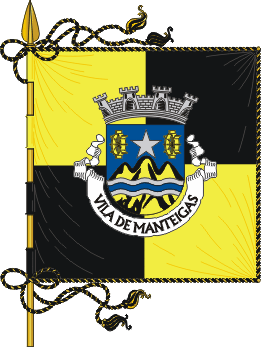
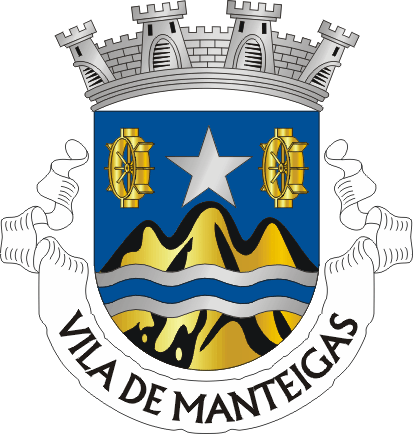
- Flag Coat of arms
- Interactive map of Manteigas
- Location in Portugal
- Coordinates: 40°24′N 7°32′W
- Country: Portugal
- Region: Centro
- Intermunic. comm.: Beiras e Serra da Estrela
- District: Guarda
- Parishes: 4

Government
  - President: Esmeraldo Carvalhinho (PS)

Area
  - Total: 121.98 km^{2} (47.10 sq mi)

Population (2011)
  - Total: 3,430
  - Density: 28.1/km^{2} (72.8/sq mi)
- Time zone: UTC+00:00 (WET)
  - Summer (DST): UTC+01:00 (WEST)
- Local holiday: March 4
- Website: http://www.cm-manteigas.pt

Manteigas (European Portuguese pronunciation: [mɐ̃ˈtɐjɣɐʃ]) is a town and a municipality in Portugal. The population in 2011 was 3,430, in an area of 121.98 square kilometres (47.10 mi^{2}).

The municipality is located in Guarda District; in Centro Region and Beira Interior Norte Subregion. It is located in the Serra da Estrela Mountains, the highest elevation in mainland Portugal. Cities nearby: Guarda, Seia, Gouveia and Covilhã.

The municipal holiday is March 4.

== Parishes ==
Administratively, the municipality is divided into 4 civil parishes (freguesias):

- Sameiro
- Santa Maria (Town of Manteigas)
- São Pedro (Town of Manteigas)
- Vale de Amoreira

== Notable people ==
- Adelino Nunes (born 1960 in Manteigas) a retired Portuguese footballer with 355 club caps and 18 for Portugal.

== Climate ==
Climate data for Manteigas, elevation: 799 m or 2,621 ft
| Month | Jan | Feb | Mar | Apr | May | Jun | Jul | Aug | Sep | Oct | Nov | Dec | Year |
|---|---|---|---|---|---|---|---|---|---|---|---|---|---|
| Mean daily maximum °C (°F) | 8.2 (46.8) | 9.8 (49.6) | 12.0 (53.6) | 14.8 (58.6) | 17.5 (63.5) | 22.9 (73.2) | 26.2 (79.2) | 26.5 (79.7) | 22.6 (72.7) | 17.3 (63.1) | 11.7 (53.1) | 8.6 (47.5) | 16.5 (61.7) |
| Daily mean °C (°F) | 5.2 (41.4) | 6.2 (43.2) | 8.3 (46.9) | 10.5 (50.9) | 13.0 (55.4) | 17.7 (63.9) | 20.4 (68.7) | 20.7 (69.3) | 17.7 (63.9) | 13.4 (56.1) | 8.4 (47.1) | 5.6 (42.1) | 12.3 (54.1) |
| Mean daily minimum °C (°F) | 2.3 (36.1) | 2.6 (36.7) | 4.6 (40.3) | 6.2 (43.2) | 8.5 (47.3) | 12.5 (54.5) | 14.7 (58.5) | 15.0 (59.0) | 12.9 (55.2) | 9.5 (49.1) | 5.2 (41.4) | 2.7 (36.9) | 8.1 (46.5) |
| Average rainfall mm (inches) | 188 (7.4) | 173 (6.8) | 127 (5.0) | 100 (3.9) | 85 (3.3) | 57 (2.2) | 12 (0.5) | 12 (0.5) | 52 (2.0) | 117 (4.6) | 168 (6.6) | 143 (5.6) | 1,234 (48.4) |
Source: climate-data.org

Climate data for Penhas Douradas, Manteigas, elevation: 1,380 m or 4,530 ft, 1991-2020 normals and 1971-2020 extremes
| Month | Jan | Feb | Mar | Apr | May | Jun | Jul | Aug | Sep | Oct | Nov | Dec | Year |
|---|---|---|---|---|---|---|---|---|---|---|---|---|---|
| Record high °C (°F) | 16.9 (62.4) | 18.6 (65.5) | 20.4 (68.7) | 22.9 (73.2) | 26.7 (80.1) | 32.0 (89.6) | 32.6 (90.7) | 33.7 (92.7) | 32.2 (90.0) | 26.1 (79.0) | 24.4 (75.9) | 19.4 (66.9) | 33.7 (92.7) |
| Mean daily maximum °C (°F) | 6.4 (43.5) | 7.1 (44.8) | 9.8 (49.6) | 11.1 (52.0) | 14.8 (58.6) | 19.5 (67.1) | 23.2 (73.8) | 23.4 (74.1) | 19.4 (66.9) | 13.8 (56.8) | 8.9 (48.0) | 7.3 (45.1) | 13.7 (56.7) |
| Daily mean °C (°F) | 3.4 (38.1) | 3.9 (39.0) | 6.0 (42.8) | 7.3 (45.1) | 10.7 (51.3) | 15.1 (59.2) | 18.3 (64.9) | 18.6 (65.5) | 15.1 (59.2) | 10.5 (50.9) | 6.1 (43.0) | 4.4 (39.9) | 10.0 (50.0) |
| Mean daily minimum °C (°F) | 0.5 (32.9) | 0.6 (33.1) | 2.3 (36.1) | 3.4 (38.1) | 6.7 (44.1) | 10.7 (51.3) | 13.5 (56.3) | 13.7 (56.7) | 10.9 (51.6) | 7.2 (45.0) | 3.3 (37.9) | 1.5 (34.7) | 6.2 (43.2) |
| Record low °C (°F) | −11.2 (11.8) | −10.0 (14.0) | −13.0 (8.6) | −6.1 (21.0) | −3.9 (25.0) | −0.5 (31.1) | 3.3 (37.9) | 3.0 (37.4) | −0.3 (31.5) | −3.3 (26.1) | −6.4 (20.5) | −8.1 (17.4) | −13.0 (8.6) |
| Average precipitation mm (inches) | 211.0 (8.31) | 158.2 (6.23) | 148.8 (5.86) | 147.9 (5.82) | 105.5 (4.15) | 41.2 (1.62) | 14.7 (0.58) | 23.0 (0.91) | 81.1 (3.19) | 199.7 (7.86) | 222.6 (8.76) | 211.5 (8.33) | 1,565 (61.61) |
| Average precipitation days (≥ 1 mm) | 12.3 | 9.9 | 10.9 | 12.5 | 10.4 | 5.1 | 2.2 | 2.7 | 6.5 | 11.5 | 12.7 | 12.0 | 108.6 |
| Average snowy days | 5.3 | 4.6 | 4.0 | 3.8 | 1.5 | 0.1 | 0 | 0 | 0 | 0.4 | 2.0 | 3.2 | 24.9 |
| Average relative humidity (%) | 80 | 81 | 77 | 76 | 73 | 68 | 57 | 55 | 63 | 75 | 79 | 78 | 72 |
| Mean monthly sunshine hours | 126.1 | 129.1 | 185.0 | 172.8 | 226.2 | 275.9 | 344.0 | 327.8 | 229.3 | 163.7 | 128.6 | 102.5 | 2,411 |
Source 1: Instituto de Meteorologia (humidity 1981-2010)
Source 2: Instituto de Meteorologia (extremes, snow days and sunshine hours 1971-2000)

== See also ==
- Beira Alta
