= Castle of Santo Estêvão =

Medieval castle in Vila Real, Portugal

- Castelo de Santo Estêvão
- Vila Real, Alto Trás-os-Montes, Norte in Portugal
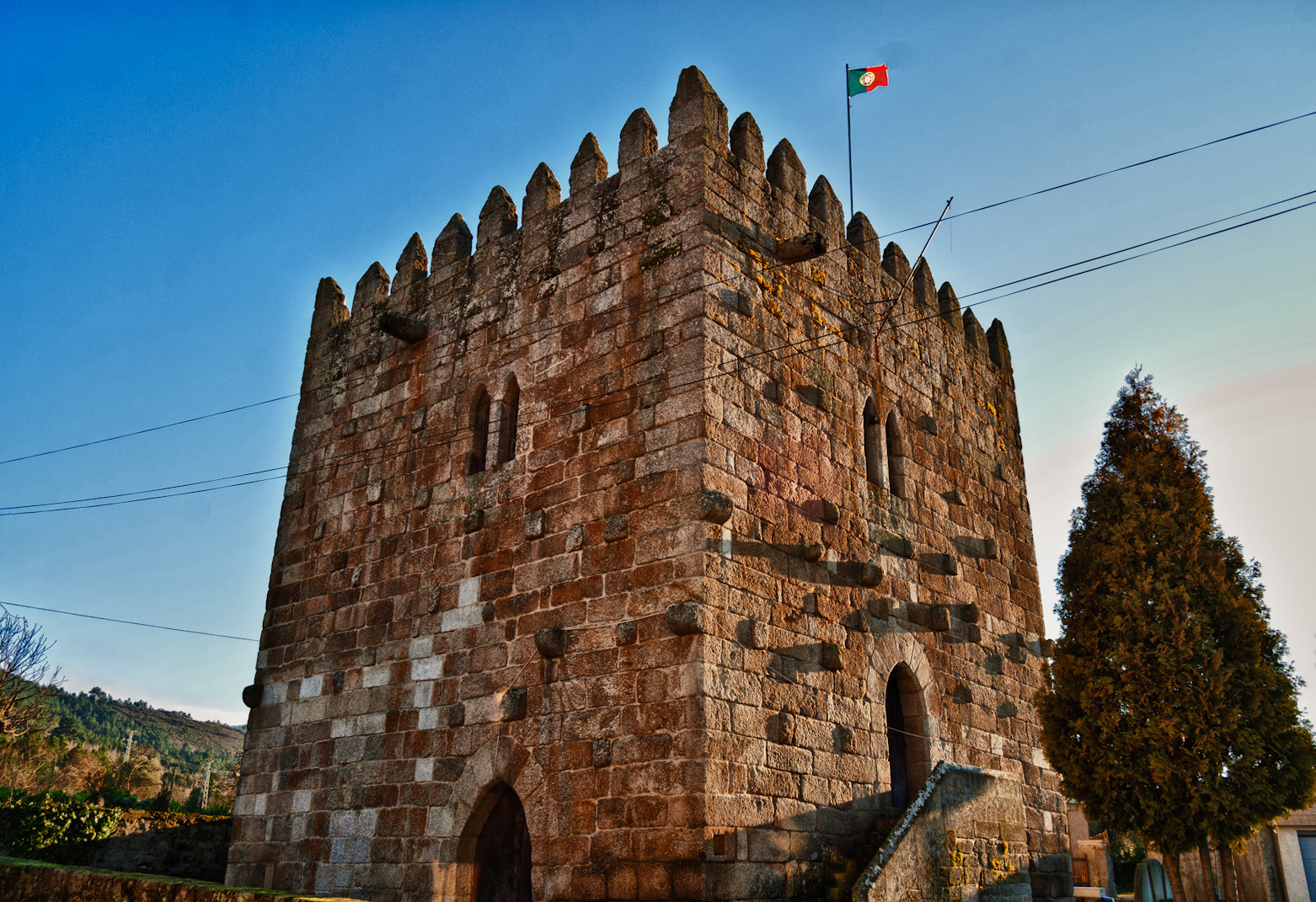
- Ruins and vestiges of the castle of Santo Estêvão

Site information
- Type: Castle
- Owner: Portuguese Republic
- Open to the public: Public

Location
- Location of the castle within the municipality of Chaves
- Coordinates: 41°45′34″N 7°25′3.9″W

Site history
- Built: 11th century
- Materials: Granite, wood, tile, windows, iron

The Castle of Santo Estêvão (Portuguese: Castelo de Santo Estêvão) is a medieval castle located in the civil parish of Santo Estêvão, municipality of Chaves, in the Portuguese district of Vila Real. Located in a dominant position over the village, the castle is within walking distance of the course of the river Tamega and the border with Spain.

== History ==
The first references to this location date to the 11th century, and suggest a rural property of great dimensions, that were eventually fortified.

During the Christian reconquest of the Iberian peninsula, the areas of Chaves (Aqua Flaviae) and Santo Estêvão were integrated into the dowry of Teresa of Leon and Castile, when she married Count Henry of Burgundy in 1093. In 1129, the region of Chaves was retaken by Muslim forces, but reconquered by Rui and Garcia Lopes in 1160, two brother-knights who offered their services to the first Portuguese king, Afonso I (1112-1185). The construction of the castle of Santo Estêvão began during his reign, his son and successor Sancho I (1185-1211).

Here they celebrated the wedding of Infanta Theresa (daughter of King Sancho I) and Alfonso IX of León, and was the home of several of Sancho's other daughters (D. Mafalda and D. Sancha); and his son, Infante D. Afonso, who succeeded the King.

In 1212, the castle was captured by Alfonso IX under the pretext of defending the rights of Infanta D. Theresa. For the next 19 years, the fortress remained on the hands of Castile, but, eventually returned to the possessions of the Portuguese Crown in 1231, during the sequence of the peace of Sabugal. The strategic position to Santo Estêvão determined that Castile and Portugal would maintain contacts between the two Crowns, as in 1253. In that year, D. Afonso III came to Santo Estevão, to receive his future wife, the Infanta D. Beatriz, daughter of Alfonso X of León and Castile. The residences of the town was adapted to serve as citadel to receive the newlyweds, and later residence. These first years proved the strategic relevance of the locality along the frontier. The castle was a signeurial possession, with a tower connected to other dependencies, likely by long-since disappeared awnings.

Santo Estêvão received a foral (charter) in 1258 from King D. Afonso III. His son and successor, King Dinis, to await the arrival of his bride, Isabel, daughter of Pedro III of Aragon. At that time, this fortress belonged to his brother Martim Afonso, the "Chichorro".

Later, during the Portuguese Interregnum, forces of D. John I camped in the town, preparing for the assault on Chaves, whose alcalde had sworn fealty to the Kingdom of Castile. As a consequence of the battles with Castile, in 1385 the castle was damaged. Legend suggests that the sovereign returned to seize the castle on Christmas Eve 1423.

This was repeated in 1666, as the castle was damaged during the war with Spain. The necessities of the medieval castle were abandoned shortly after the sixteenth century and was subsequently adapted into a rectory.

Between 1940 and 1946, the DGEMN completed many repairs and recuperation of the castle, including: the central pillar of the tower was reconstructed, including the construction of foundation and installation of new masonry; reconstruction of double windows, including the exchange of damaged masonry (general repairs and shoring-up masonry); covering openings in masonry and stonework; repointing and cleaning; placing two rods and a square iron hanger in the roof frame including the finial iron plate; execution of the roof covering with double national tile; execution and settlement of thick elm beams in two floors; demolition of masonry walls; general consolidation of the tower battlements including the replacement of damage stones; execution of mortared masonry walls; and regularization of the surrounding land. On 27 April 1942, the castle was ceded to the Casa do Povo de Santo Estêvão.

It was classified as a Monumento Nacional (National Monument) by decree published on 16 May 1939.

On 13 July 1951, it was transferred to the title of the Portuguese State.

The Portuguese government initiated reconstruction and restoration programs at the end of the 20th century; in 1962, construction of the fence, irregular wall around the tower, slabs and staircase to the terrace were repaired.

== Architecture ==
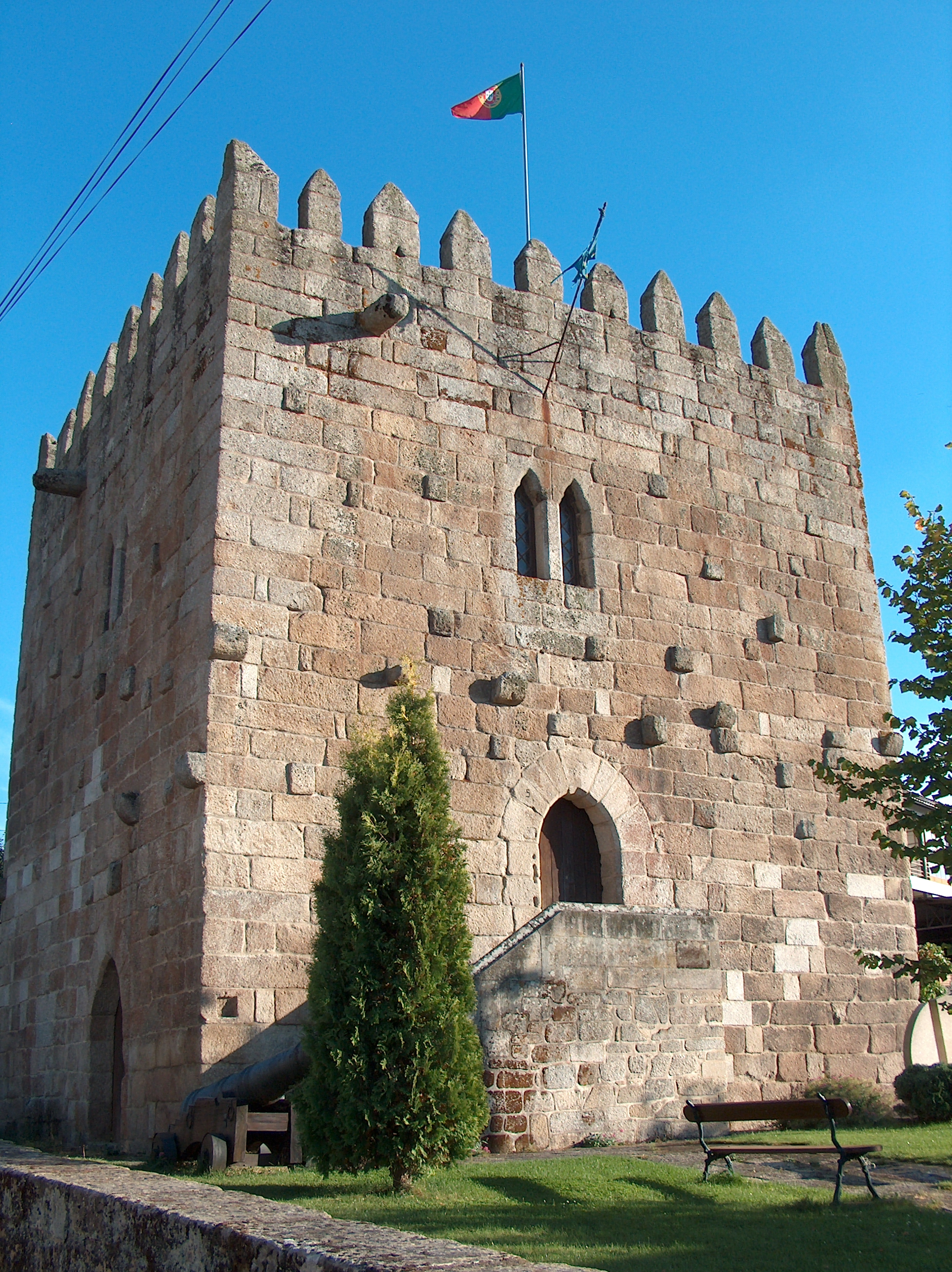
The facade of the keep tower of Santo Estêvão

The castle is situated in an isolated, rural elevation over the settlement of Santo Estêvão, in a fertile valley of the Tâmega River, 5 kilometres (3.1 mi) from Chaves. It is inserted in a small, grassy terrain, with central corridor punctuated by some trees, garden bunks and hydrants. It is protected by a stone wall, accessible from an iron gate, while a bathroom was addorsed to the eastern structure.

Nearby is the parochial Church of Santo Estêvão and belltower, which was constructed from the ruins of a chapel that pertained to the castle and fortified courtyard. The architectural configuration of the belfry demonstrates its defensive characteristics, due to wall thickness and almost non-existence of openings.

The castle that remains consists of a simple, rectangular tower covered in ceiling tower, encircled by a roadway. The facades are 14 metres (46 ft) in height, three stories tall erected using the Opus vittatum, crowned with pyramidal merlons of varying size. The principal facade is oriented to the west, with accessway consisting of broken staves, situated at the level of the first floor, preceded by stone stairs with guard of the same material, the marked and surmounted by covered porch.

At the level of the second floor, is a twin window, consisting of narrow trilobal glass with central panel. Over the left is a cylindrical gargoyle. On the southern lateral facade are three simple slits on the first floor and a twin window with similar trilobal glass and central gargoyle on the second floor. The eastern facade has two small slits on the ground floor, with two slits on the first and a arched portico, with a gargoyle above.

=== Interior ===
The interior walls are constructed of granite, dividing individual spaces, with a staircase between floors addorsed to the south wall. The ground floor has a central pillar of granite, with chamfered rectangular section, paved with stone slabs and wood beams that support the first floor. The first floor includes wood flooring, with a similar central pillar, that is narrower and a two-flight wood staircase providing access to the second floor. The second floor has ample space, with wood flooring, and support for the ceiling and small trapdoor with movable iron staircase. In the four vains as twinned windows with a granite fireplace in the southeast.
