= Castro Laboreiro e Lamas de Mouro =

- Civil parish
- Location in Portugal
- Coordinates: 42.03°N 8.16°W
- Country: Portugal
- Region: Norte
- Intermunic. comm.: Alto Minho
- District: Viana do Castelo
- Municipality: Melgaço

Area
  - Total: 106.09 km^{2} (40.96 sq mi)

Population (2011)
  - Total: 657
  - Density: 6.19/km^{2} (16.0/sq mi)
- Time zone: UTC+00:00 (WET)
  - Summer (DST): UTC+01:00 (WEST)

Castro Laboreiro e Lamas de Mouro is a civil parish in the municipality of Melgaço, Portugal. It was formed in 2013 by the merger of the former parishes Castro Laboreiro and Lamas de Mouro. The population in 2011 was 657, in an area of 106.09 km^{2}.

Castro Laboreiro is 1 of 18 parishes of the Melgaço municipality.

== Climate ==
Climate data for Portelinha, altitude: 1,018 m (3,340 ft)
Month	Jan	Feb	Mar	Apr	May	Jun	Jul	Aug	Sep	Oct	Nov	Dec	Year
Average precipitation mm (inches)	306 (12.0)	266 (10.5)	209 (8.2)	166 (6.5)	157 (6.2)	79 (3.1)	37 (1.5)	53 (2.1)	111 (4.4)	214 (8.4)	277 (10.9)	312 (12.3)	2,187 (86.1)
Source: Portuguese Environment Agency
