= Parochial Memories of 1758 =

Enquiry sent to every parish in Portugal following the 1755 Lisbon earthquake

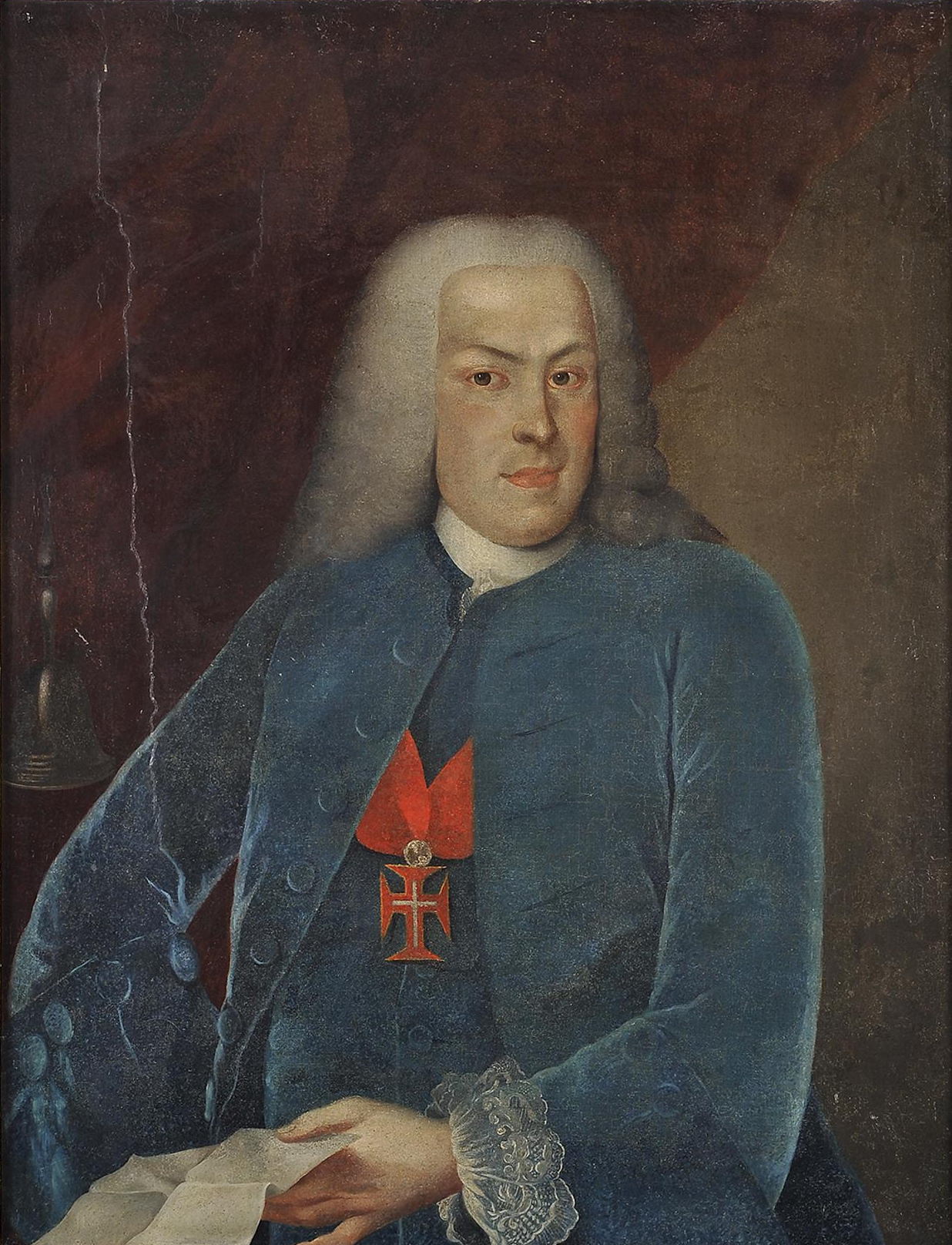
Sebastião José de Carvalho e Melo, 1st Marquis of Pombal

The Parochial Memories of 1758 (Portuguese: Memórias Paroquiais de 1758) are the results of an enquiry sent to every parish in Portugal after the 1755 Lisbon earthquake by the order of Sebastião de Carvalho e Melo, the Secretary of State of Internal Affairs of the Kingdom. The exercise was organised according to a plan containing 60 written questions; the compiled answers, relaying accounts on not only the damage sustained by the earthquake but also information on the local geography, demography, history, and economy, are valuable historical documents and are stored in the country's National Archive.

Because Secretary Carvalho e Melo (today more commonly known by the title of Marquis of Pombal, which he obtained in 1769) was the first to attempt an objective description of the broad causes and consequences of an earthquake, he is regarded as a forerunner of modern seismological scientists. By analysing and cross-referencing the parish priests' accounts, modern scientists are able to reconstruct the event with some degree of scientific precision; without the questionnaire, this would have been impossible.

== The questionnaire ==
The enquiry was split in three parts: the first comprised 27 questions about the settlement; the second, 13 questions about the local landforms, specifically mountains; and the third, 20 questions about the local watercourses.

All three parts ended by asking if there was anything else that was worthy of memory in an effort to collect more information about the parishes' local peculiarities.

About the settlement	About the landforms	About the watercourses
1. In what province is the town located, and to what diocese, judicial district, municipality and civil parish does it belong?; 2. Does it belong to the King, or is it held by a tenant? If the latter, who are they at present?; 3. How many houses are there in town? How many people live there?; 4. Is it located on a plain, valley, or hill? What other settlements can be found nearby and how far are they?; 5. Does it have outskirts? If so, what are the names of the settlements within them, and how many houses do they have?; 6. Does the local parish lie within the town, or does it extend to other neighbouring settlements? If the latter, what are their names?; 7. What is the town's patron saint? How many altars (and to which saints are they consecrated), and how many naves does the parish church have? Are there any active Confraternities? If so, how many, and devoted to which saints?; 8. Is the Parish Priest a Curate, a Vicar, a Rector, a Prior, or an Abbot? Who suggests his appointment? What is his revenue?; 9. Does anyone in town hold any benefice? If so, what is their revenue, and who distribution said benefices?; 10. Are there any convents? Whose religious orders do they belong to, and what are their patron saints?; 11. Is there a hospital? If so, who runs it, and what is its revenue?; 12. Is there a Holy House of Mercy? When was it established, what is its revenue, and is there anything else notable about it?; 13. Are there any hermitages? If so, consecrated to which saints, are they located within or outside of town, and whom do they belong to?; 14. Are there any pilgrimages to said hermitages? If so, is it practiced always, or only on given days of the year?; 15. What are the fruits of the land that townspeople gather in greater abundance?; 16. Does it have its own judge (juíz ordinário), etc., a Chamber, or is it subject to the judiciary of another town? If the latter, which?; 17. Is the town a couto, the seat of a municipality, an honra, or a beetria? (Note: The terms refer to special privileges some towns could be bestowed with: a couto was a land whose occupants were excused from royal taxation, justice, and military service; a concelho was a municipality, with specific administration, duties and privileges (most notably, freedom from feudal control); an honra was a couto belonging to a Fidalgo; and a beetria was a community of free peasants who had the right to elect, among the nobility, their lord.); 18. Is there any memory of men who were distinguished by virtues, letters, or arms, who originated in this town?; 19. Is there a fair? If so, when is it held, how long does it last, and are the merchants exempt from tax (feira franca) or not (feira cativa)?; 20. Does the town have a courier? If so, what day of the week does it arrive and depart; if not, what other town's courier do the residents recourse to?; 21. How far is the town to the seat of the diocese, and how far is it to Lisbon, the capital of the Kingdom?; 22. Does the town hold any special privilege, antiquities, or any other noteworthy aspects?; 23. Is there, within the town or nearby, any famous fountain or pond whose waters are reputed to have any kind of special virtue?; 24. If the town has a harbour, whether natural or artificial, describe the place as well as the vessels that are able to dock or anchor there.; 25. If the town is walled, describe its walls; if it lies within a place-of-arms, describe the fortification. If there is any castle or ancient tower in the town or in the district, describe its present condition.; 26. Was any damage sustained during the earthquake in 1755? If so, what was damaged, and has it been rebuilt?; 27. List anything else that's worthy of memory, and that is not mentioned in this questionnaire.	1. What is the name of the local mountain?; 2. How many leagues is it in width and length, where does it begin and where does it end?; 3. What are the names of main mountains on its range?; 4. Can the source of any streams be found on it, and what are their noteworthy properties; where do these streams flow through until they reach their mouth?; 5. What other villages or other settlements lie on the same mountain?; 6. Are there, in the district, any headwaters with rare properties?; 7. Are there, on the mountain, any metal mines, quarries, or other worthy raw materials?; 8. What plants or medicinal herbs grow or are grown in the mountain? What kind of fruits abound?; 9. Are there, on the mountain, any monasteries, pilgrimage churches, or miraculous images?; 10. Describe the weather.; 11. Is there any livestock on it, or game?; 12. Are there any notable lakes or ponds?; 13. List anything else that's worthy of memory.	1. What is the name of the local river, and where is its source?; 2. Does the river have a great discharge at the source, and does it flow all year long?; 3. Does the river have tributaries? If so, where?; 4. Is the river navigable? If so, which vessels can it accommodate?; 5. Is the river turbulent or does it flow smoothly? In all its extension or just in a section?; 6. Does the river flow from north to south, from south to north, from west to east, or from east to west?; 7. Does the river have fish? If so, what kinds abound?; 8. Is fishing carried out on it? If so, on what times of the year?; 9. Are people free to fish there, or does it belong to anyone in particular? In all its extension or just in a section?; 10. Are its banks fertile for agriculture? Do fruit-bearing trees or wild berries grow there?; 11. Do the river's waters have any particular virtue?; 12. Is the river called by the same name its whole length, or is it called by something else in some parts? What are these names? Is there any memory of it being called something else in older times?; 13. Does the river flow into the ocean, or another river? What is it called, and where is the mouth?; 14. Are there any waterfalls, dams, irrigation channels, or levees that in some way impede navigability?; 15. Do stone or wooden bridges span the river? How many, and where?; 16. Does it have any watermills, olive oil mills, fulling mills, water wheels, or any such devices?; 17. Can gold be extracted from the stream at present, or has it been at any point in the past?; 18. Can the people freely use the river's waters for agriculture, or do they have to pay some annuity?; 19. How many leagues in length is the river, and through which settlements does it pass from source to mouth?; 20. List anything else that's worthy of memory, and that is not mentioned in this questionnaire.
