= Henrique Pereira =

Henrique Pereira may refer to:

- Henrique M. Pereira (born 1972), Angolan conservation biologist
- Henrique Pereira (footballer) (born 2002), Portuguese footballer
