= Peneda-Gerês National Park =

National park in Portugal

- IUCN category II (national park)
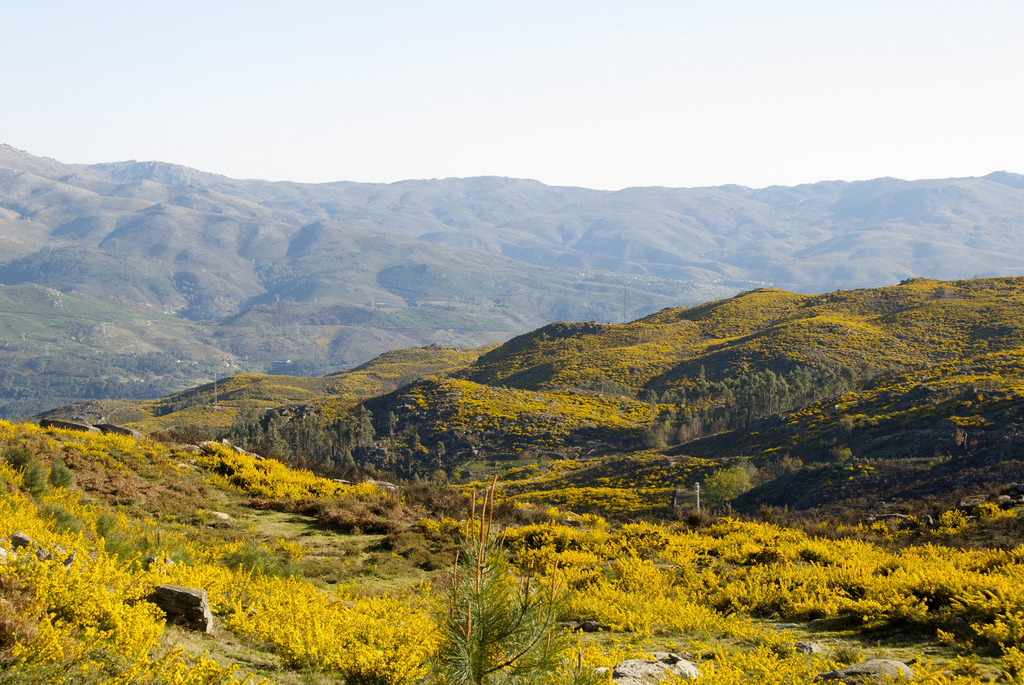
- A view of the yellowish landscape of the Serra Amarela (Yellow Range)
- Interactive map of Peneda-Gerês National Park
- Location: Norte, Portugal
- Coordinates: 41°43′29″N 8°9′46″W
- Length: 45.44 km (28.24 mi)
- Width: 45.34 km (28.17 mi)
- Area: 695.93 km^{2} (268.70 sq mi)
- Max. elevation: 1,546 m (5,072 ft)
- Established: 8 May 1971
- Named for: The two extreme serras where the national park extends between Serra da Peneda and Serra do Gerês
- Visitors: 92,777 (2017-2020 average)
- Governing body: ICNF
- Operator: Parque National da Peneda-Gerês Headquarters
- Website: Parque Natural da Peneda-Gerês

Peneda-Gerês National Park (Portuguese: Parque Nacional da Peneda-Gerês, Portuguese pronunciation: [ˈpaɾkɨ nɐsjuˈnal dɐ pɨˈneðɐ ʒɨˈɾeʃ]), also known simply as Gerês, is a national park in Norte Region, Portugal. Created in May 1971, it is the oldest protected area and the only national park in Portugal. It covers an area of 695.9 km^{2} (268.7 sq mi), occupying the Districts of Viana do Castelo, Braga, and Vila Real and bordering the Spanish Baixa Limia – Serra do Xurés natural park to the north, which forms the UNESCO biosphere reserve of Gerês-Xurés.

Peneda-Gerês was given its name by its two main granite massifs, the Serra da Peneda and the Serra do Gerês which, with the Serra Amarela and the Serra do Soajo, constitute the park's highest peaks. On the other hand, the precipitous valleys, crossed by high flowing streams, host lush temperate broadleaf and mixed forests of oak and pine, being one of the last strongholds of the typical Atlantic European flora of Portugal, contrasting with an evolving Mediterranean biome. The park is also home to around 220 vertebrate species, some only native to the Iberian Peninsula including the threatened Pyrenean desman, Iberian frog, or gold-striped salamander.

The area now occupied by the park has had a long history, reflected by its countless megalithic structures and Roman remains. Presently it is home to around 9,000 people scattered throughout small villages.

The aims of the park are to protect the soil, water, flora, fauna and landscape, while preserving its value to the existent human and natural resources, as such its surrounding airspace is restricted.

== History ==
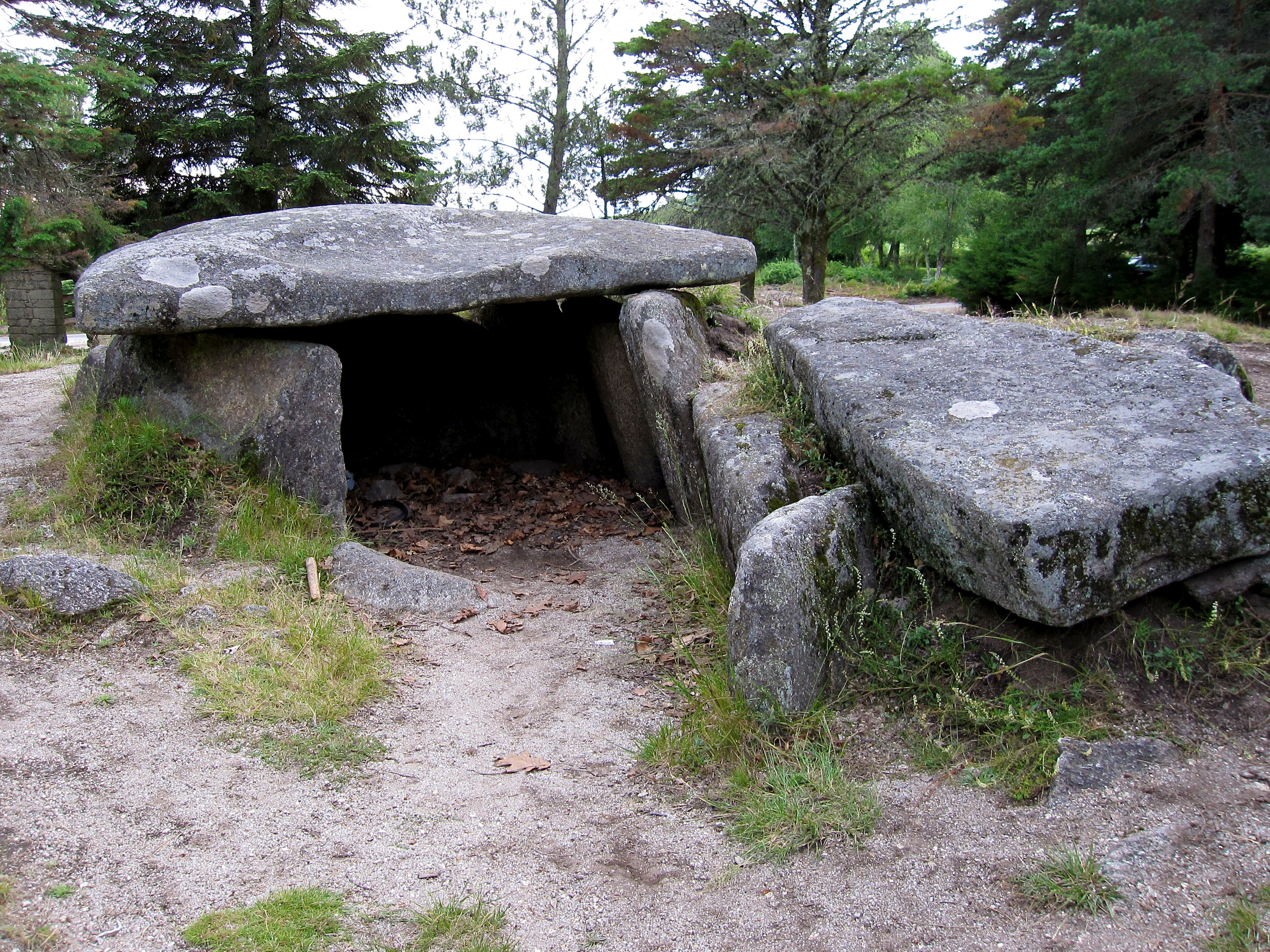
Dolmens in Serra do Soajo, used by early inhabitants in the inhospitable high elevations

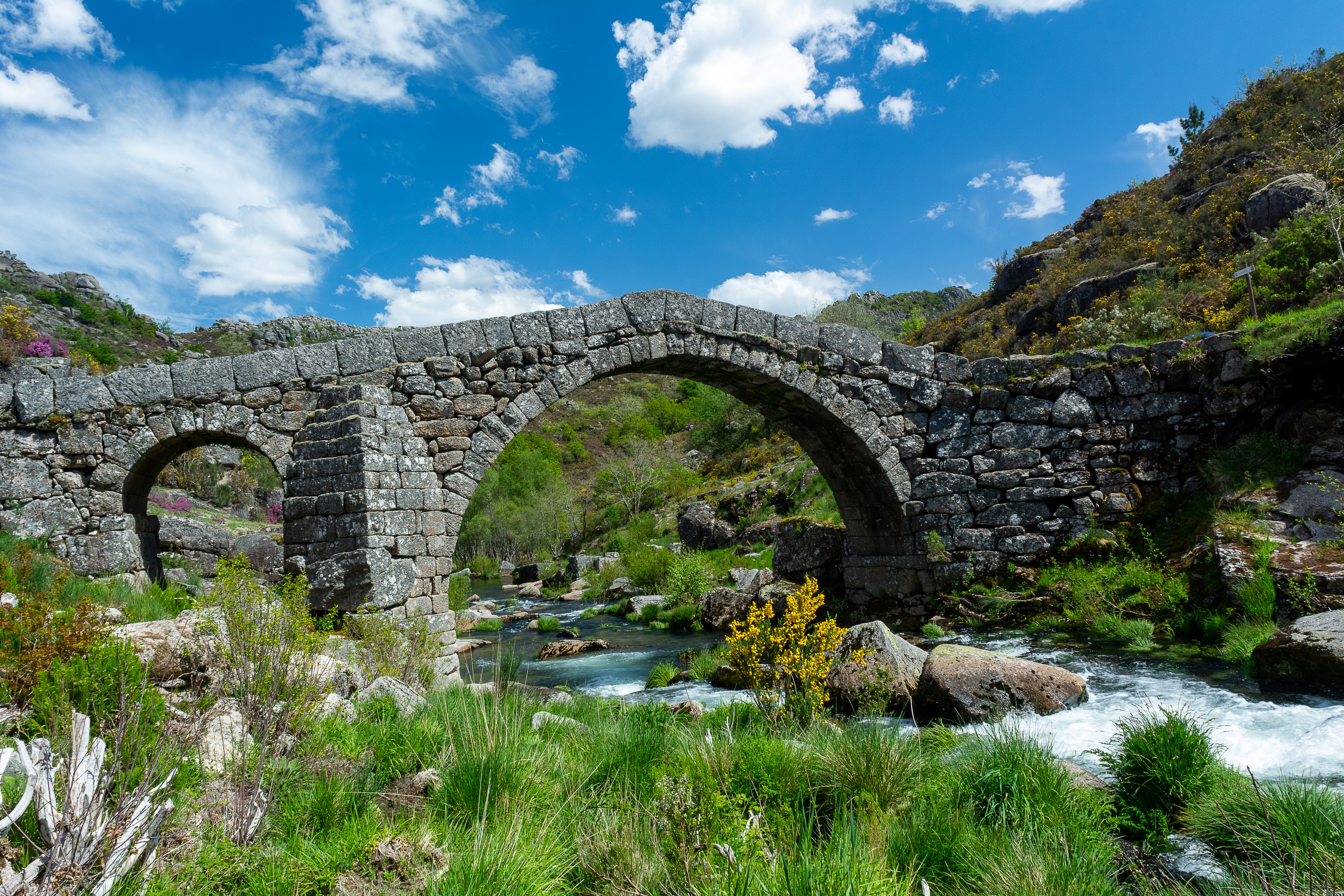
Bridge of Cava da Velha, a Roman bridge built in the first century AD, refined during the 7th or 8th century.

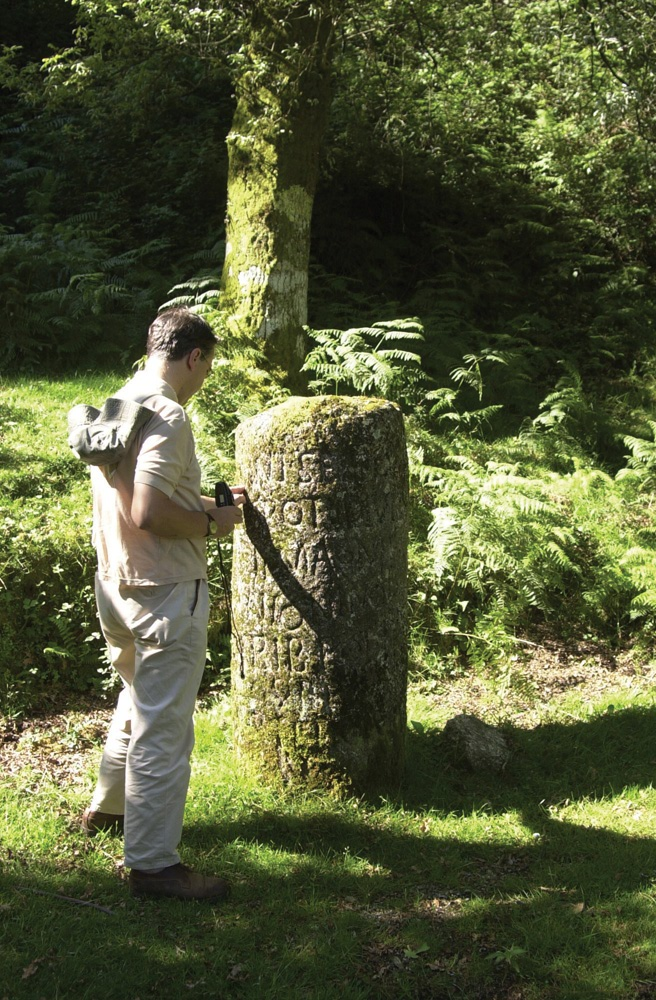
Marking of the Via Nova (Geira) Roman road

Probably due to the inhospitality of the Gerês Mountains, the oldest signs of human presence date only from 6000 BC to 3000 BC; dolmens and other megalithic tombs remain interspersed within the region, including near Castro Laboreiro and Mourela. Human activities consisted of animal husbandry and incipient agriculture, and archaeological evidence points to the beginning of a decrease in forest cover.

The Roman Geira, a Roman road, which formerly connected the Roman civitates of Asturica Augusta and Braccara Augusta, crossed what is now the park. Long stretches of the road along the Homem River are still preserved, as are several Roman bridges and numerous millenarium markers. The Germanic tribe of the Buri accompanied the Suebi in their invasion of the Iberian Peninsula and establishment in Gallaecia (modern northern Portugal and Galicia). The Buri settled in the region between the Cávado and Homem rivers, in the area later known as Terras de Bouro (Land of the Buri). The move from the terraced cliffs and slopes to the lowland river valleys brought-on a patterned of new deforestation.

The reoccupation of mountain areas started in the 12th century, intensifying in the 16th century with the introduction of maize, beans, and potatoes from the Americas. Agricultural fields occupied former pastures, and these were displaced to more elevated areas resulting in a mosaic of fields, pastures, and forests.

The reforestation of uncultivated lands, imposed by the government in 1935, reduced the available pastures, and contributed to a rural exodus that continued after the 1950s. Yet it was still common practice for the residents of mountain communities to spend part of the year in two locations, primarily near Castro Laboreiro. From about Easter to about Christmas, residents would live in homes over 1,000 m above sea level, known as branda (from the Portuguese brando, meaning 'mild' or 'gentle'). In the remaining part of the year, these inhabitants would occupy homes in the river valley, known as inverneira (from the Portuguese inverno, meaning 'winter').

In 1970, the village of Vilarinho das Furnas was flooded with the construction of a dam on the Homem River. During years with low rainfall, the village ruins stands above the water, attracting a considerable number of tourists.

The creation of the national park (completed under decree no. 187/71, 8 May 1971) envisioned a planning area of mountainous spaces, in order to conserve the environment, while permitting human and natural resource activities, which would include educational, touristic and scientific projects. At heart is the conservation of soils, water, flora and fauna, in addition to the preservation of landscapes within the vast mountainous region in the northwest of Portugal.

In 1997, Peneda-Gerês was included in the Natura 2000 network, and in 1999, designated a Special Protection Area for Wild Birds. Moreover, it also encompasses an important area of natural forest, which forms part of the European Network of Biogenetic Reserves, and is recognized as a national park by the International Union for Conservation of Nature. In 2007, it was accepted in the PAN Parks network that certifies the quality protected areas, according to rigorous criteria of nature conservation, cultural services and sustainability.

== Geography ==
The Peneda-Gerês National Park is located in the northwest of Portugal, extending through the municipalities of Melgaço, Arcos de Valdevez and Ponte da Barca (in the district of Viana do Castelo), Terras de Bouro (district of Braga), and Montalegre (district of Vila Real). The park includes an area of 702.90 km^{2}, of which 52.75 km^{2} are public lands, 194.38 km^{2} are private property and the remaining 455.77 km^{2} are commons.

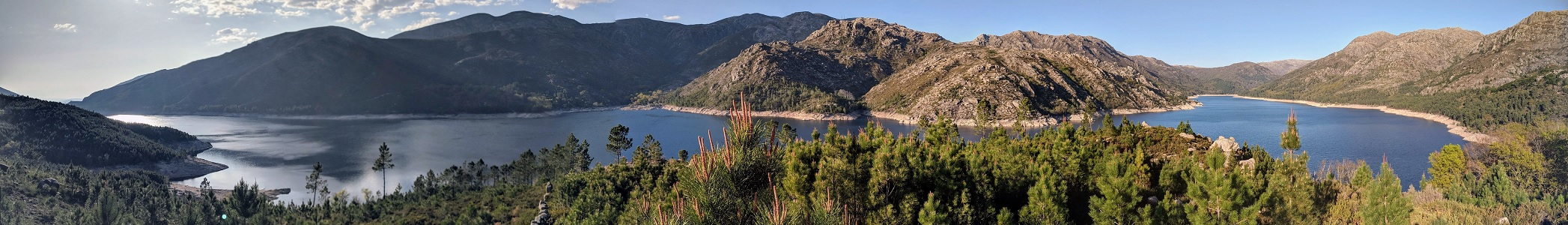
Panorama of the Vilarinho das Furnas Dam
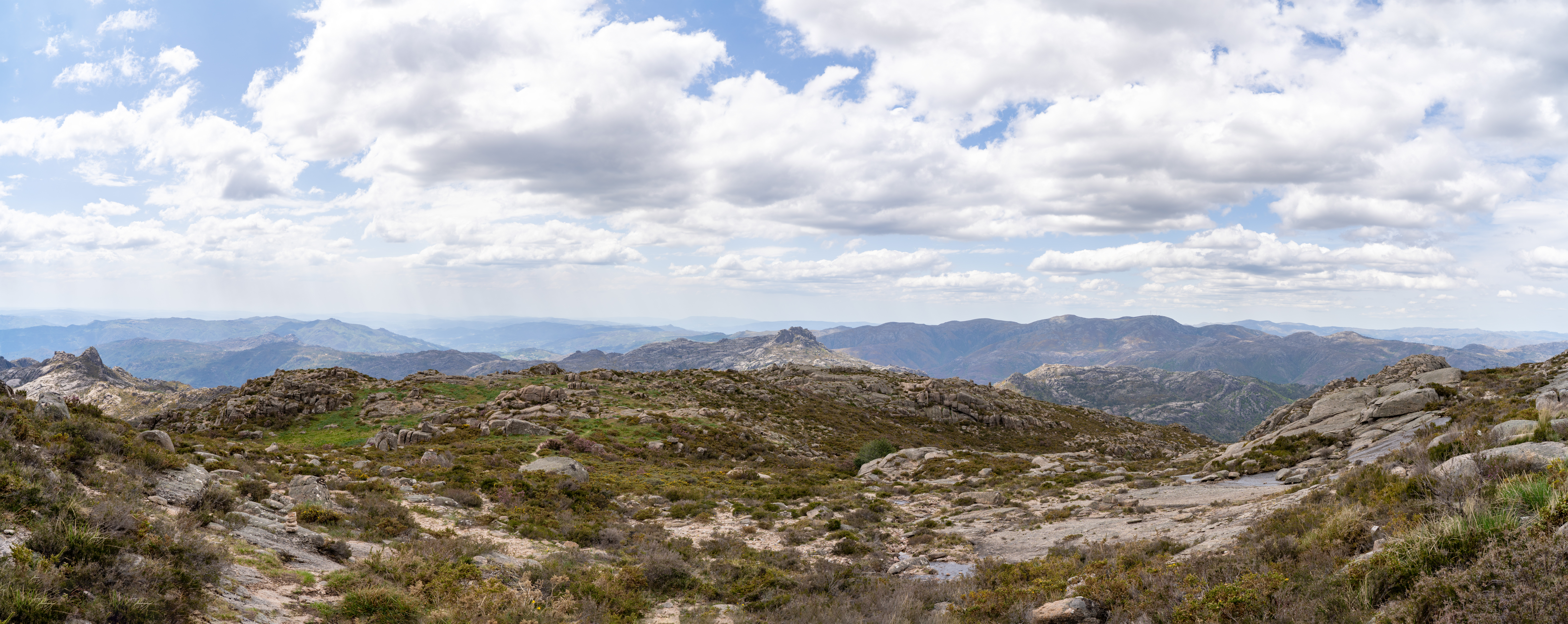
Panorama of the Serra do Geres

=== Physical geography ===
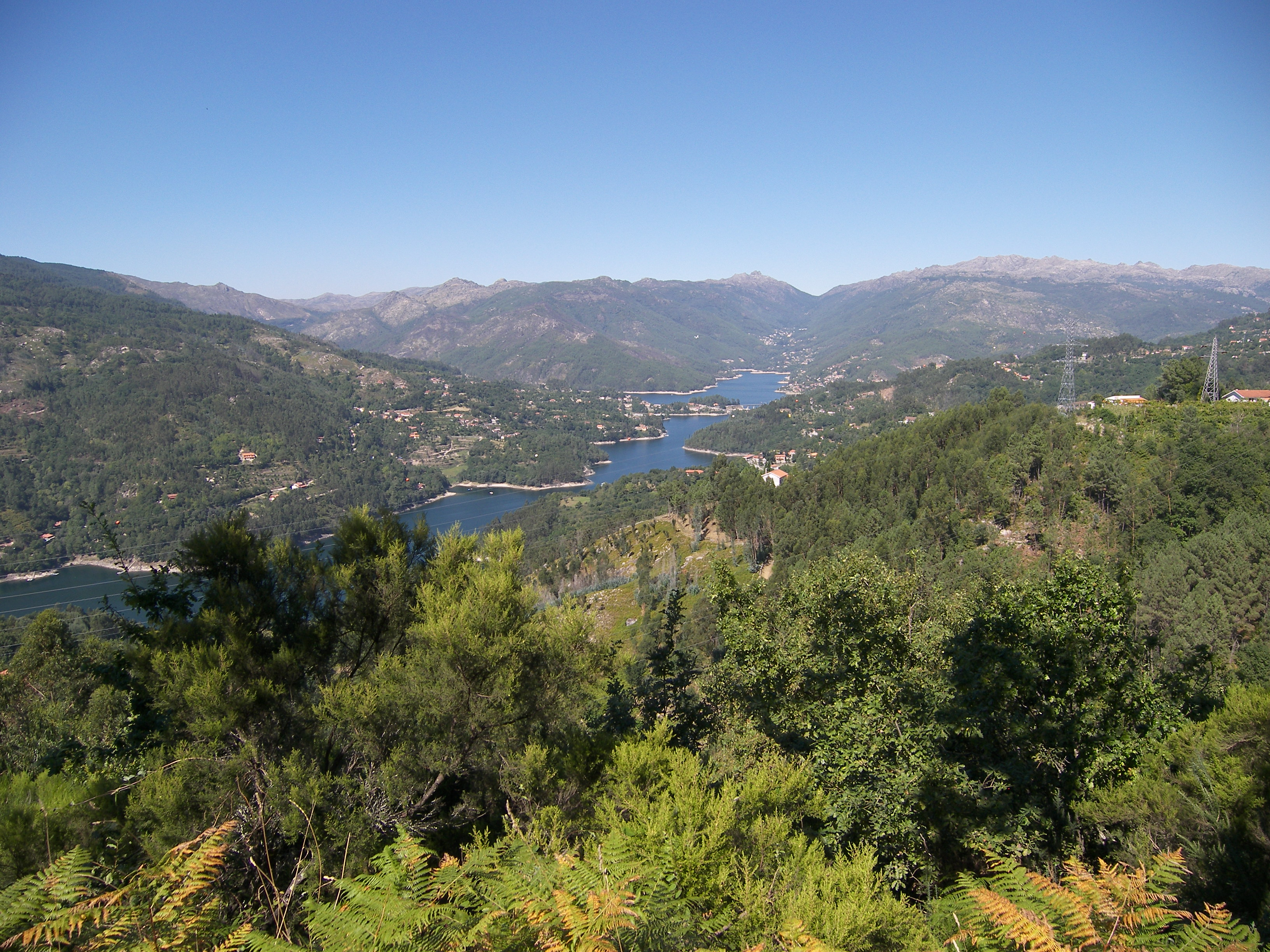
A view of the Lima River and landscape within the national park

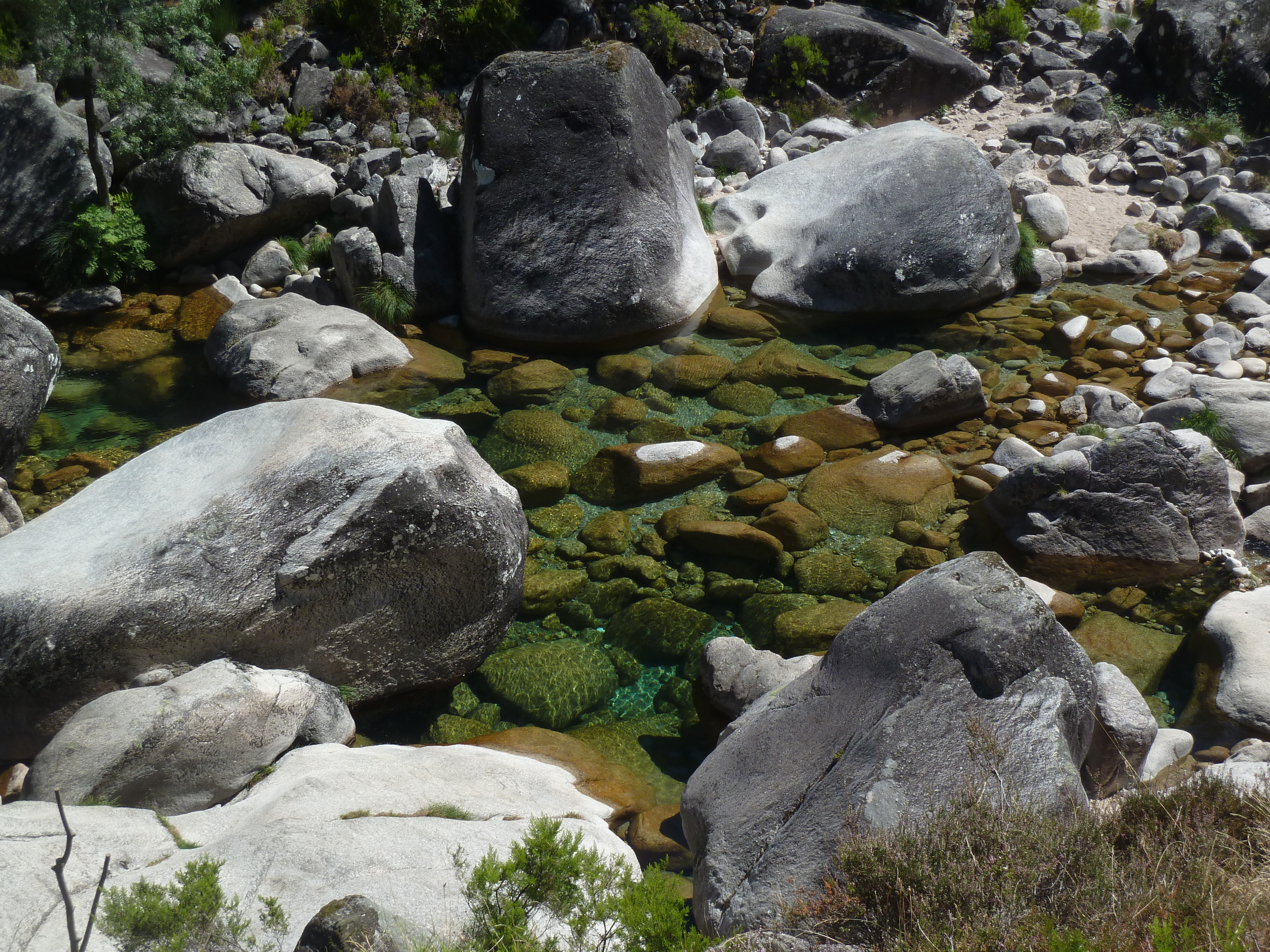
The rounded rocks and boulders of the Gerês granite structure, surrounding a small kettle lake

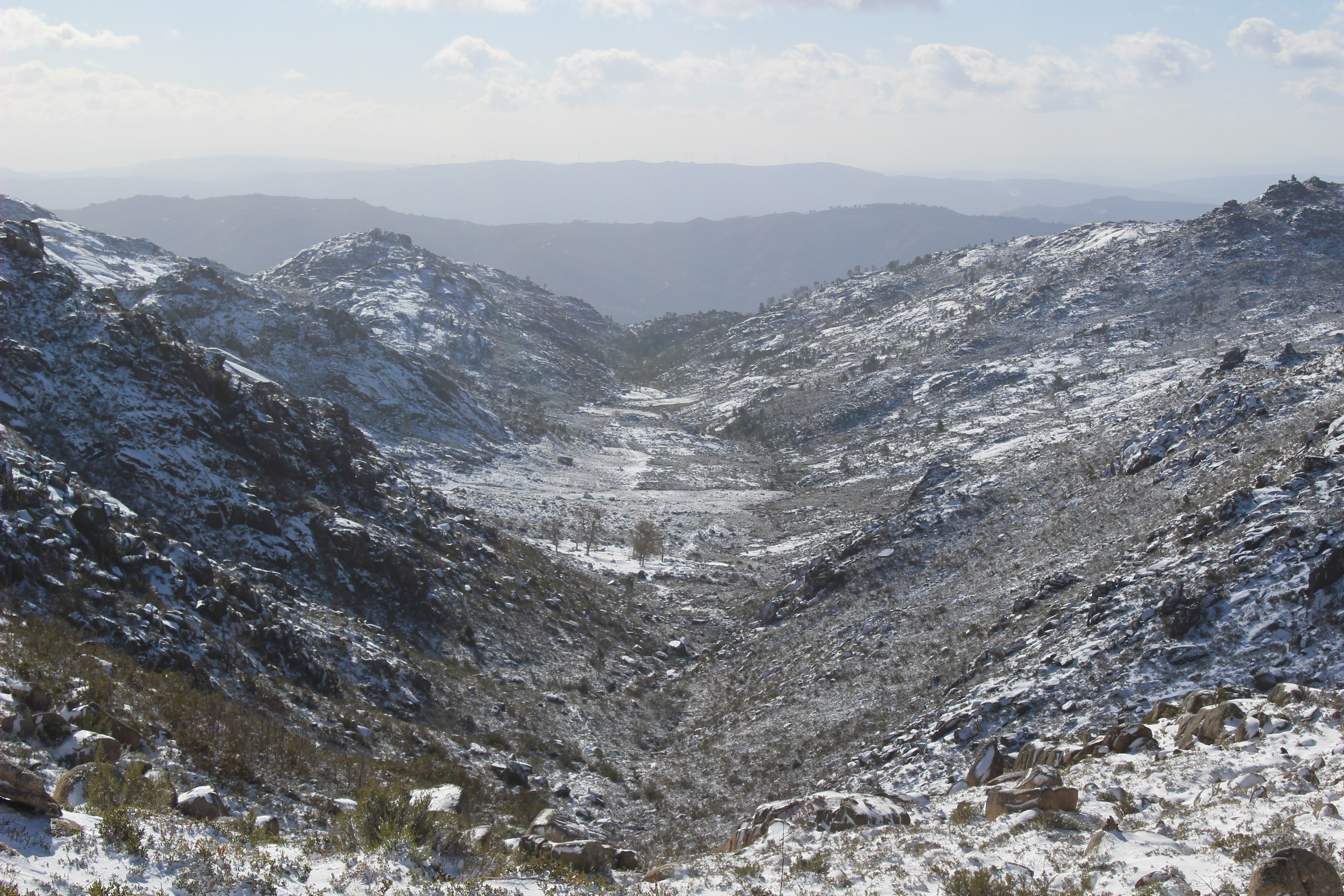
Glaciar carved valley of the Homem river

The park is a vast amphitheatre-shaped space sculpted during the Variscan orogeny by geological forces, wind and water, and extends from the Castro Laboreiro to the Mourela plateaus, encompassing the Serra da Peneda, Serra do Soajo, Serra Amarela and the Serra do Gerês. These form a barrier between the ocean plains to its west and the plateaus in the east. The highest peaks are Peneda (1340 m), Soajo (1430 m), Amarelo (1350 m), Gerês (1545 m) and Altar dos Cabrões (1,538 m) located on the border with Galicia, continuing into this territory as part of the Serra do Xurés.

The granitic rocks that dominate this shield were deposited during the process of continental collision that brought together the lower Iberian peninsula with Europe, between 380 million and 275 million years; the oldest of them, at Amarela, date from 310 million years ago. The most extensive of the granitic rocks that occur within the park are the Peneda-Gerês pluton which is an exposed relief that became exposed around 290-296 Ma by the Gerês-Lovios fault. Sedimentary layers laid down between 435 and 408 Ma (Silurian epoch) were deformed and metamorphosed into schists, greywackes and quartzites (such as in the area of Castro Laboreiro). Also, dykes and sills formed from quartz and aplite-pegmatites were mineralized resulting in tin, tungsten, molybdenum and gold (which would become the focus of mining in the human era, at the now-closed mines of Carris and Borrageiro). Generally, the lithological structures can be divided into three layers:

- Gerês granite structures - includes Gerês, Paufito, Carris, Borrageiro and Tieiras, and is composed of special mineralogical and geochemical intrusions that occurred through third phase of Hercynian faults, caused by a differentiating of basic magmas. The terrain in these regions include a vigorous relief, a rounded granite petrography, such as in the Serra da Peneda;
- older granite structures - includes a very heterogeneous group of Mezio, Soajo, Serra Amarela, Linhoso, Parada, Tourém, Pedrada e Ermida, Germil, Sezelhe and Frades, with a texture and composition that quite variable, from the crustal fusion of various materials with surface contamination;
- sedimentary formations - includes sediments deposited in Silurian waters and metamorphosed during the Devonian period, as well as carbon and more recent sediments, resulting during the Quaternary. The first group includes principally schists and quartz-feldspar, greywackes and quartzites with meta-crystals, such as andalusite, cordierite and sillimanite. These sedminentary deposits are prominently preserved in two linear patches: Vale das Antas and Louriça, near Castro Laboreiro, between two granite structures. The most recent geological formations are those created by fluvial, torrential and glacial deposits.

During the Pleistocene (approximately 1.8 to 0.001 Ma ago) climatic variations resulted in an extension of glacial fields to the mid-latitudes. While there are no remnants of glaciers now, their Ice Age products (U-shaped valleys, moraines, glacial deposits, polished and natural granite surfaces) are identified in the Serra da Peneda, Serra do Soajo and Serra do Gerês mountain ranges. The principal watersheds that cross the park are those of the Minho (occupying 2% of the park), Lima (47.8%) and Cávado (50.2%), with brooks and waterfalls common on many of the mountain slopes, in addition to several secondary tributaries (such as the Homem, Rabagão, Castro Laboreiro, and Arado rivers). The Lima cuts across the PNPG east to west, while the Cávado serves the southern limits of the districts of Vila Real and Braga. Fractures in the landscape have confined the rivers to deep, straight valleys and are visible in the younger granite outcrops visible in the uncovered higher altitudes. Owing to the number tributaries, the construction of hydroelectrical dams has been undertaken to generate electricity across six locations: Alto Rabagão, Paradela, Caniçada, Vilarinho da Furna, Touvedo and Lindoso.

Soils within the elevated terrains and inclined spaces are non-existent, while the valleys are rich and deep, deposited and transported by pluvial action. These strata are textured, permeable, easily worked, albeit with a weak consistency, and marked by the peculiarities of local agriculture. The incorporation of biomass and elevated precipitation, along with the low autumn-winter temperatures give an origin to the alterations in pH levels. The elevated levels of incompletely decomposed organic material, low in phosphorus and intermittently low/high in potassium, are subject of alluvial deposition.

=== Climate ===
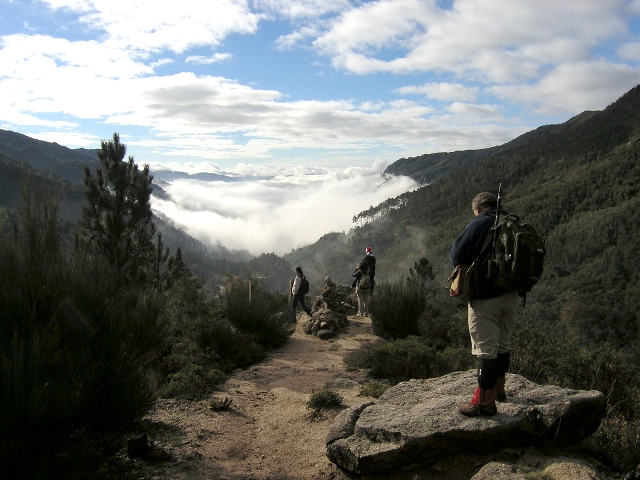
Fog forms over the valley in Terras de Bouro

The region of the Parque Nacional Peneda Gerês falls within a transitional zone between the Atlantic and Mediterranean environments, and is influenced by various climatic systems: Atlantic, Mediterranean and Continental. Its climate is greatly influenced by the topography; the mountains exert a barrier effect to the passage of hot and wet air masses coming from the Atlantic Ocean, resulting in elevated precipitation throughout the year.

It falls in a part of Portugal (and Europe) that is affected by extreme rainfall, obtaining precipitation levels of 3,200 mm (130 in) per year on higher altitudes, and 1,600 mm (63 in) at lower altitudes, with more than 130 rainy days per year. Average daily high temperatures range from 10 to 21 °C (50 to 70 °F), with some variation; the high lands have an average high temperature of about 11 °C (52 °F), ranging from 4 to 20 °C (39 to 68 °F), one of the few places in Portugal with an oceanic climate, while areas in the valleys (such as the Homem, Lima and Cávado river valleys) have warmer climates, with daily max temperatures ranging from 12 to 28 °C (54 to 82 °F) (with an average of 20 °C (68 °F)), transitioning into a Hot-summer Mediterranean climate.

Consequently, the area is prone to various micro-climates, affected by variations in altitude, topographic characteristics, human occupation, different exposures and thermal variation. Similarly, this difference has resulted in an interchange of vegetation characteristic of Mediterranean, Euro-Siberian and Alpine environments.

Climate data for Cabril, elevation: 585 m or 1,919 ft, 1981-2010 normals and extremes
Month	Jan	Feb	Mar	Apr	May	Jun	Jul	Aug	Sep	Oct	Nov	Dec	Year
Record high °C (°F)	23.6 (74.5)	23.0 (73.4)	27.4 (81.3)	30.0 (86.0)	34.2 (93.6)	36.3 (97.3)	38.8 (101.8)	39.9 (103.8)	38.0 (100.4)	31.7 (89.1)	24.5 (76.1)	22.0 (71.6)	39.9 (103.8)
Mean daily maximum °C (°F)	11.4 (52.5)	12.6 (54.7)	15.8 (60.4)	16.9 (62.4)	19.8 (67.6)	24.5 (76.1)	27.3 (81.1)	27.7 (81.9)	24.6 (76.3)	19.0 (66.2)	14.4 (57.9)	12.0 (53.6)	18.8 (65.9)
Daily mean °C (°F)	7.9 (46.2)	8.7 (47.7)	11.2 (52.2)	12.1 (53.8)	14.8 (58.6)	18.9 (66.0)	21.2 (70.2)	21.5 (70.7)	19.1 (66.4)	14.8 (58.6)	10.9 (51.6)	8.7 (47.7)	14.2 (57.5)
Mean daily minimum °C (°F)	4.4 (39.9)	4.7 (40.5)	6.5 (43.7)	7.3 (45.1)	9.7 (49.5)	13.2 (55.8)	15.0 (59.0)	15.3 (59.5)	13.7 (56.7)	10.5 (50.9)	7.4 (45.3)	5.3 (41.5)	9.4 (48.9)
Record low °C (°F)	−6.0 (21.2)	−3.2 (26.2)	−4.7 (23.5)	−1.0 (30.2)	1.5 (34.7)	5.0 (41.0)	6.9 (44.4)	8.0 (46.4)	5.0 (41.0)	3.7 (38.7)	−1.1 (30.0)	−4.5 (23.9)	−6.0 (21.2)
Average rainfall mm (inches)	196.9 (7.75)	141.6 (5.57)	140.3 (5.52)	134.4 (5.29)	105.2 (4.14)	53.1 (2.09)	26.9 (1.06)	37.2 (1.46)	68.0 (2.68)	196.5 (7.74)	192.4 (7.57)	238.7 (9.40)	1,531.2 (60.27)
Average rainy days (≥ 1 mm)	12.5	9.5	9.5	11.2	10.2	5.5	3.3	3.8	5.8	11.8	12.1	12.7	107.9
Mean monthly sunshine hours	130.6	127.9	193.9	174.2	222.6	270.8	313.7	297.4	228.4	160.5	113.5	99.5	2,333
Source: Instituto Português do Mar e da Atmosfera (1982-2000 sunshine hours)

Climate data for Lamas de Mouro, 1980-1990, altitude 880 m (2,890 ft)
Month	Jan	Feb	Mar	Apr	May	Jun	Jul	Aug	Sep	Oct	Nov	Dec	Year
Mean daily maximum °C (°F)	9.1 (48.4)	9.3 (48.7)	11.8 (53.2)	12.5 (54.5)	14.8 (58.6)	19.3 (66.7)	22.1 (71.8)	22.2 (72.0)	21.5 (70.7)	16.1 (61.0)	12.3 (54.1)	10.3 (50.5)	15.1 (59.2)
Daily mean °C (°F)	4.1 (39.4)	4.7 (40.5)	6.5 (43.7)	7.5 (45.5)	9.5 (49.1)	13.4 (56.1)	15.5 (59.9)	15.4 (59.7)	14.4 (57.9)	10.6 (51.1)	7.8 (46.0)	5.7 (42.3)	9.6 (49.3)
Mean daily minimum °C (°F)	−0.9 (30.4)	0.2 (32.4)	1.1 (34.0)	2.5 (36.5)	4.3 (39.7)	7.6 (45.7)	9.1 (48.4)	8.5 (47.3)	7.4 (45.3)	5.1 (41.2)	3.3 (37.9)	0.9 (33.6)	4.1 (39.4)
Average precipitation mm (inches)	228 (9.0)	200 (7.9)	161 (6.3)	122 (4.8)	124 (4.9)	58 (2.3)	26 (1.0)	38 (1.5)	90 (3.5)	168 (6.6)	204 (8.0)	231 (9.1)	1,650 (64.9)
Mean monthly sunshine hours	86	87	155	137	175	218	260	259	216	143	76	78	1,890
Source: Instituto Português do Mar e da Atmosfera

Climate data for Leonte, elevation: 862 m or 2,828 ft, (1984–2004)
Month	Jan	Feb	Mar	Apr	May	Jun	Jul	Aug	Sep	Oct	Nov	Dec	Year
Average precipitation mm (inches)	362.3 (14.26)	244.9 (9.64)	206.9 (8.15)	247.5 (9.74)	192.7 (7.59)	91.7 (3.61)	60.1 (2.37)	61.9 (2.44)	171.5 (6.75)	304.8 (12.00)	364.8 (14.36)	399.2 (15.72)	2,708.3 (106.63)
Source: Leonte pluviometric station

=== Biome ===
Rivas-Martinez defined the foothills of both the Serra do Gerês and the Serra da Cabreira (lands below the Tâmega, Ave and Cávado watersheds) as the frontier between the Euro-Siberian and Mediterranean regions, granting a significant floral and phytogeographic importance to the National Park.

==== Flora ====
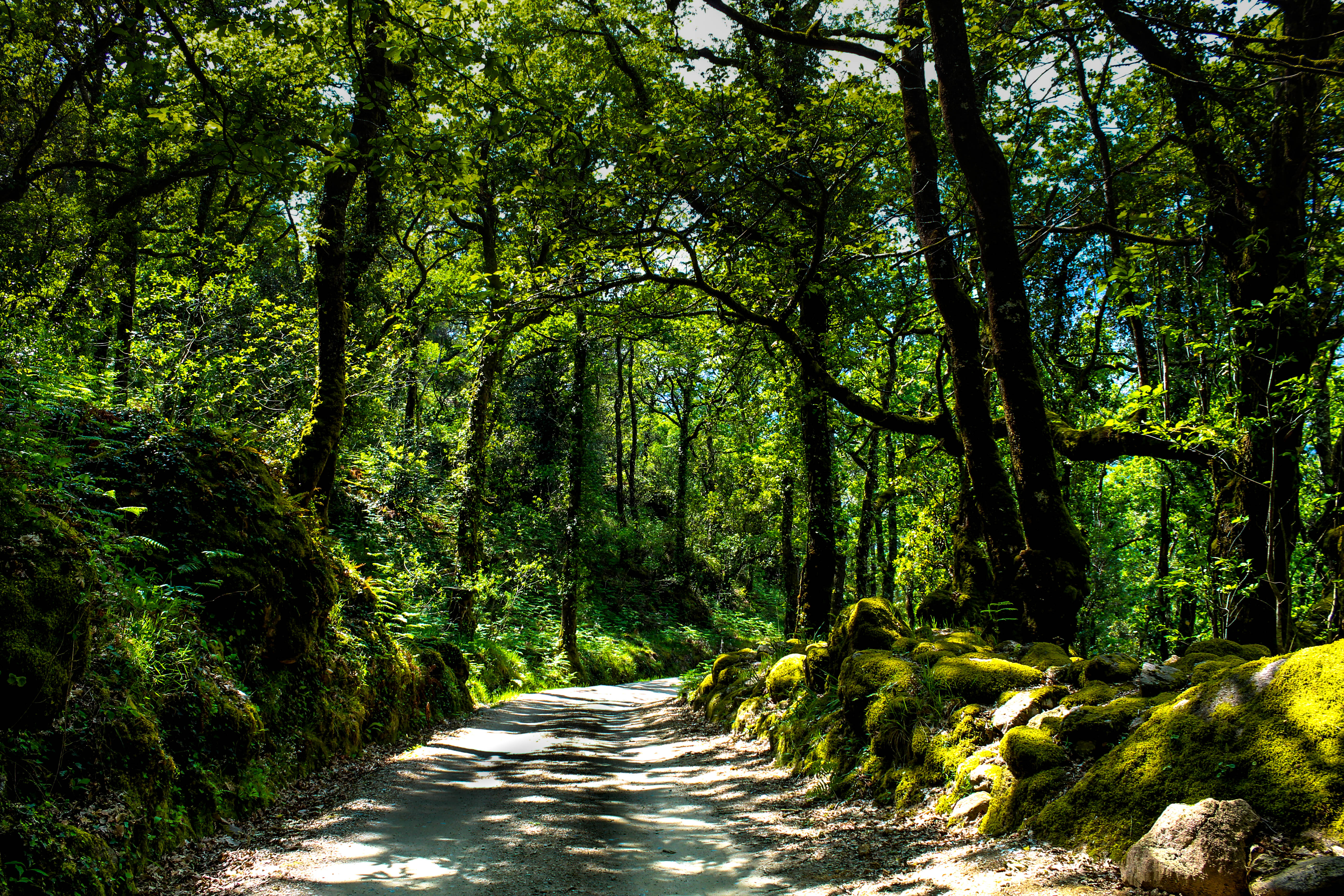
Temperate broadleaf and mixed forests of Peneda-Gerês

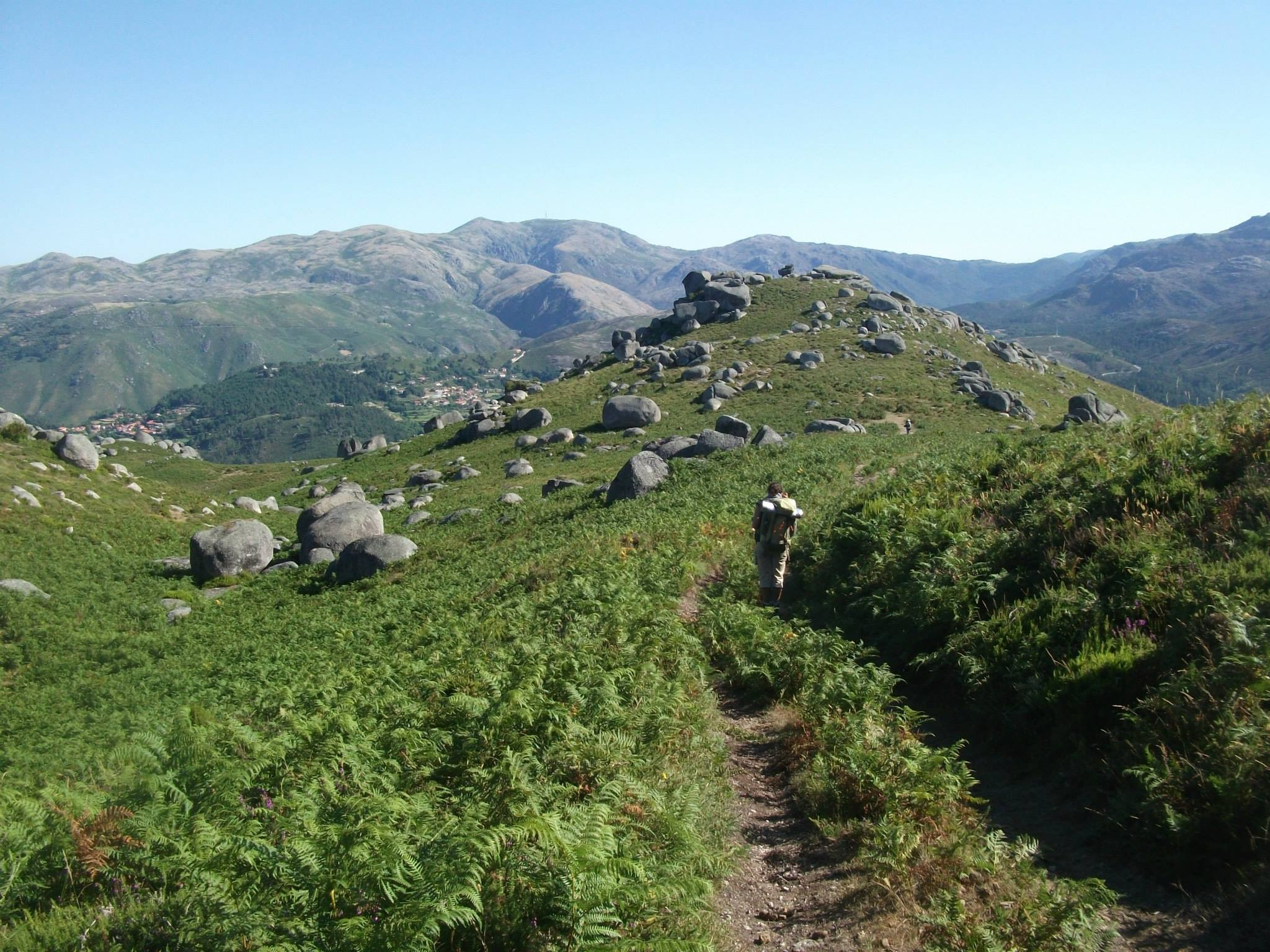
Mountain colonized by ferns. There are over 24 species of fern in the park.

Biomass coverage of the Serra do Gerês, Serra Amarela, Serra do Peneda and Serra do Soajo, as well as the Mourela and Castro Laboreiro plateaus, are dominated by four distinct biomes: oak forest, shrubbery, marshes and riparian vegetation.

The floristic diversity includes 823 vascular taxa that occur in 128 types of natural vegetation. The oak forests which are common throughout the park, are especially concentrated in the Ramiscal, Peneda, Gerês and Beredo river valleys. These forested areas are dominated by an alliance between the Pyrenean (Quercus pyrenaica) and European (Quercus robur) oaks, which themselves are differentiated among the lower altitudes and exposed flanks (the Rusceto-Quercetum roboris) and those of typical Atlantic environments (Myretillo-Quercetum roboris). The first association is commonly found with European oak (Quercus rober), cork oak (Quercus suber), butcher's broom (Ruscus aculeatus), maple (Acer pseudoplatanus) and Portuguese laurel (Prunus lusitanica), while the second association unites the European and Pyrenean oaks with bilberry (Vaccinium myrtillus), strawberry tree (Arbutus unedo) and European holly (Ilex aquifolium). In upper altitudes there are patches of European oak that enter into their own association (Holco-Quercetum pyrenacia), which is integrated into another group (Quericon robri-patraea). These oaks have been, over the course of human settlement, the object of intense use, resulting in a general degradation of the spaces into nothing more than shrubbery.

The bush and shrublands, which characterize the remainder of the spaces (74% of the park), are dominated by dwarf (Ulex minor) and European (Ulex europaeus) gorse and heather (Erica umbellata and Calluna vulgaris), with a mixtures of common juniper (Juniperus communis), southern heather (Erica australis) in the upper altitudes, while lower altitude bush includes cross-leaved heather (Erica tetralix), dwarf gorse (Ulex minor), Dorset heath (Erica ciliaris), common sundew (Drosera rotundifolia), pale butterwort (Pinguicula lusitanica), marsh violet (Viola palustris) and purple moor grass (Molinia caerulea).

Riparian and marshlands along the river courses are also sites of rare species of chain ferns (Woodwardia radicans), willow (Salix repens), downy birch (Betula pubescens), deciduous shrubs (Spiraea hypericifolia), Portuguese enchanter's nightshade (Circaea lusitanica) and angelica herbs (Angelica laevis).

There are 627 flora species identified by Serra and Carvalho (1989) as under pressure and considered endangered, which included two medicinal plants: tutsan (Hypericum androsaemum) and sundew (Drosera rotundifolia). Based on the protection list of botanical species, and UICN categories: 18 are considered in risk of extinction, 17 are vulnerable and one is rare. They also identified two species as extinct within the park boundaries: a geranium (Geranium lanuginosum) and fragrant orchid (Gymnadenia conopsea). There are three endemic species. Those factors that have been identified that threaten these habitats include: natural and manmade fires, use of forest for fuel wood and agricultural use of habitats.

==== Fauna ====
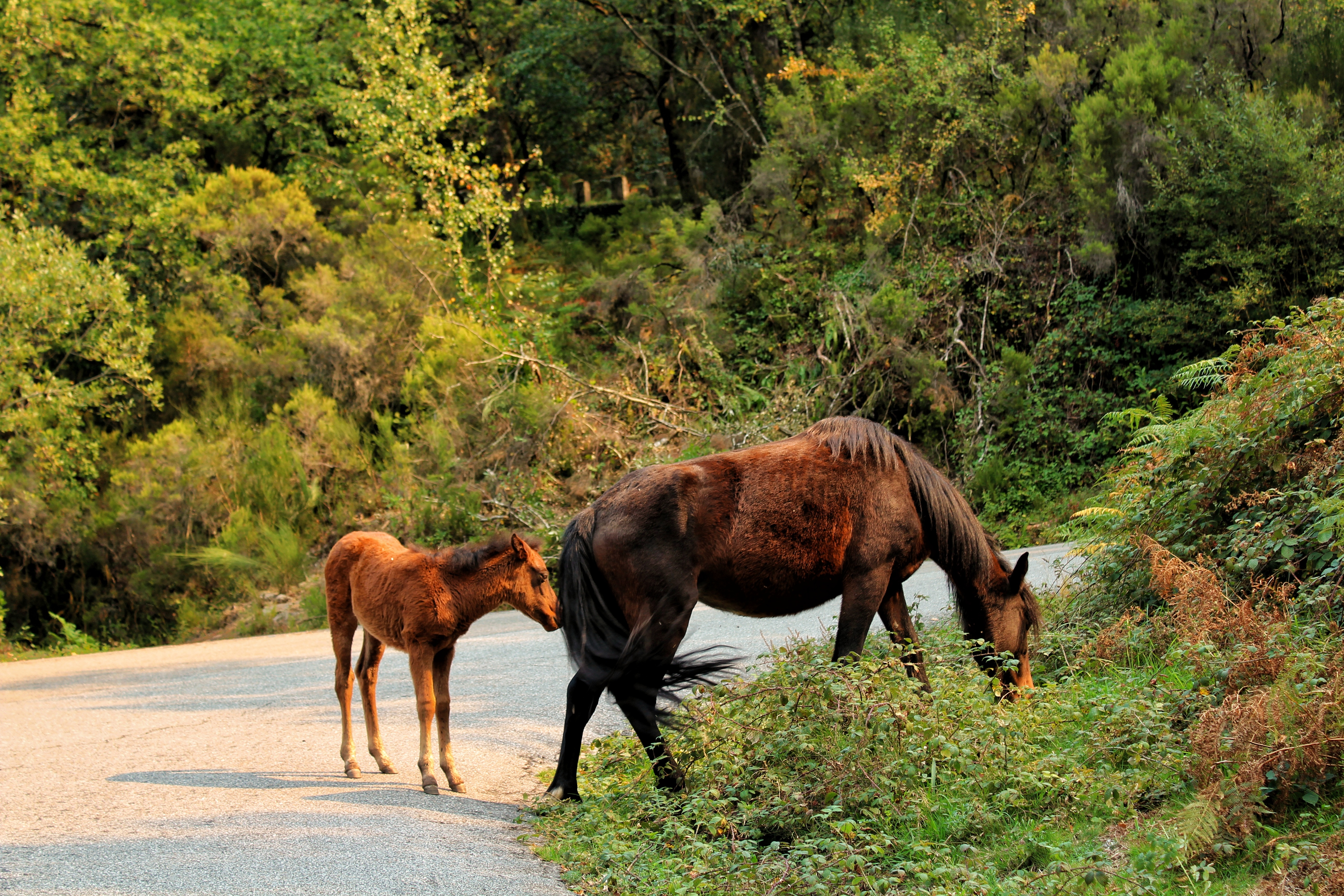
Garrano wild horses have lived in this region since Prehistoric times

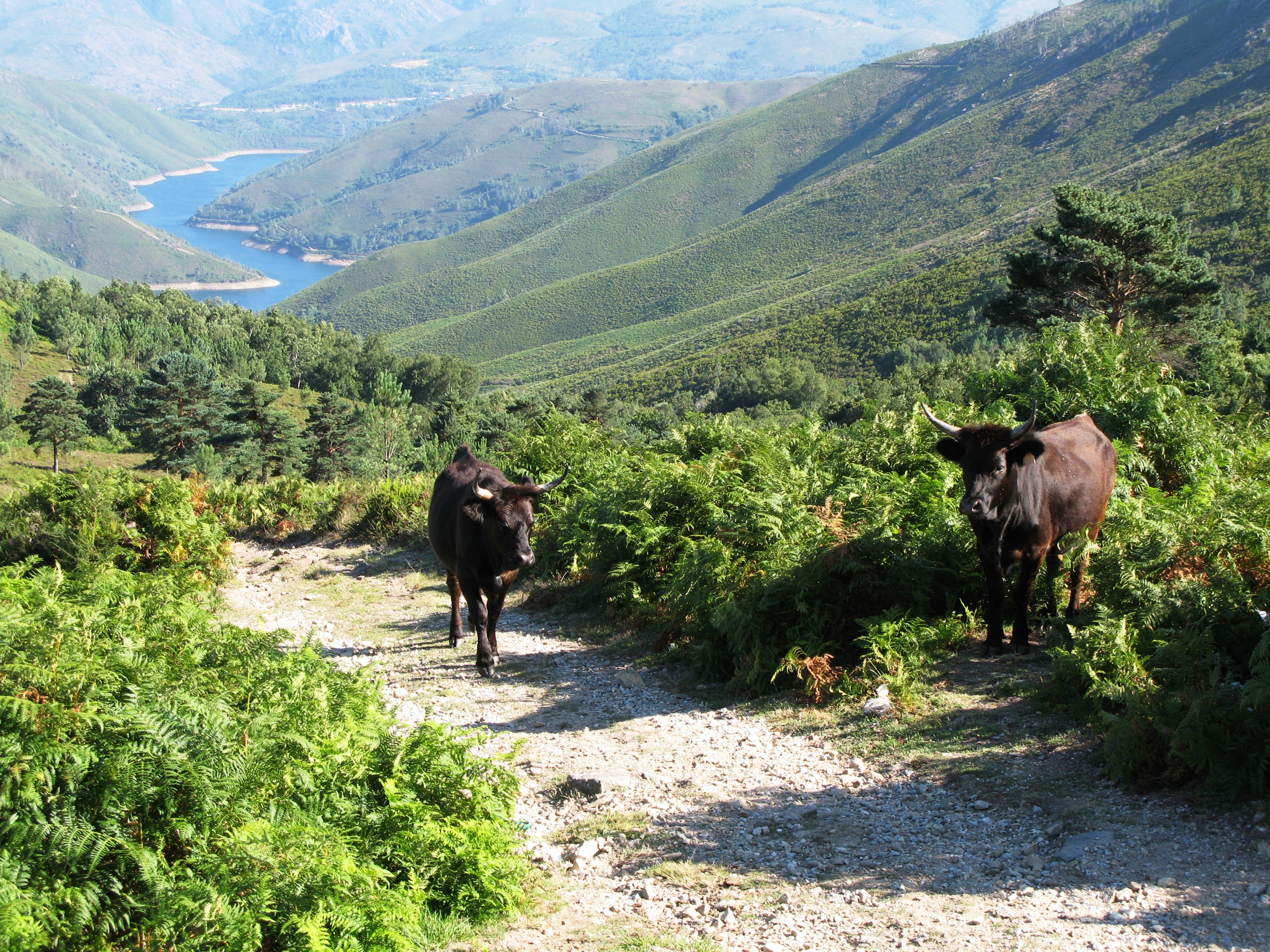
Feral cows of the park

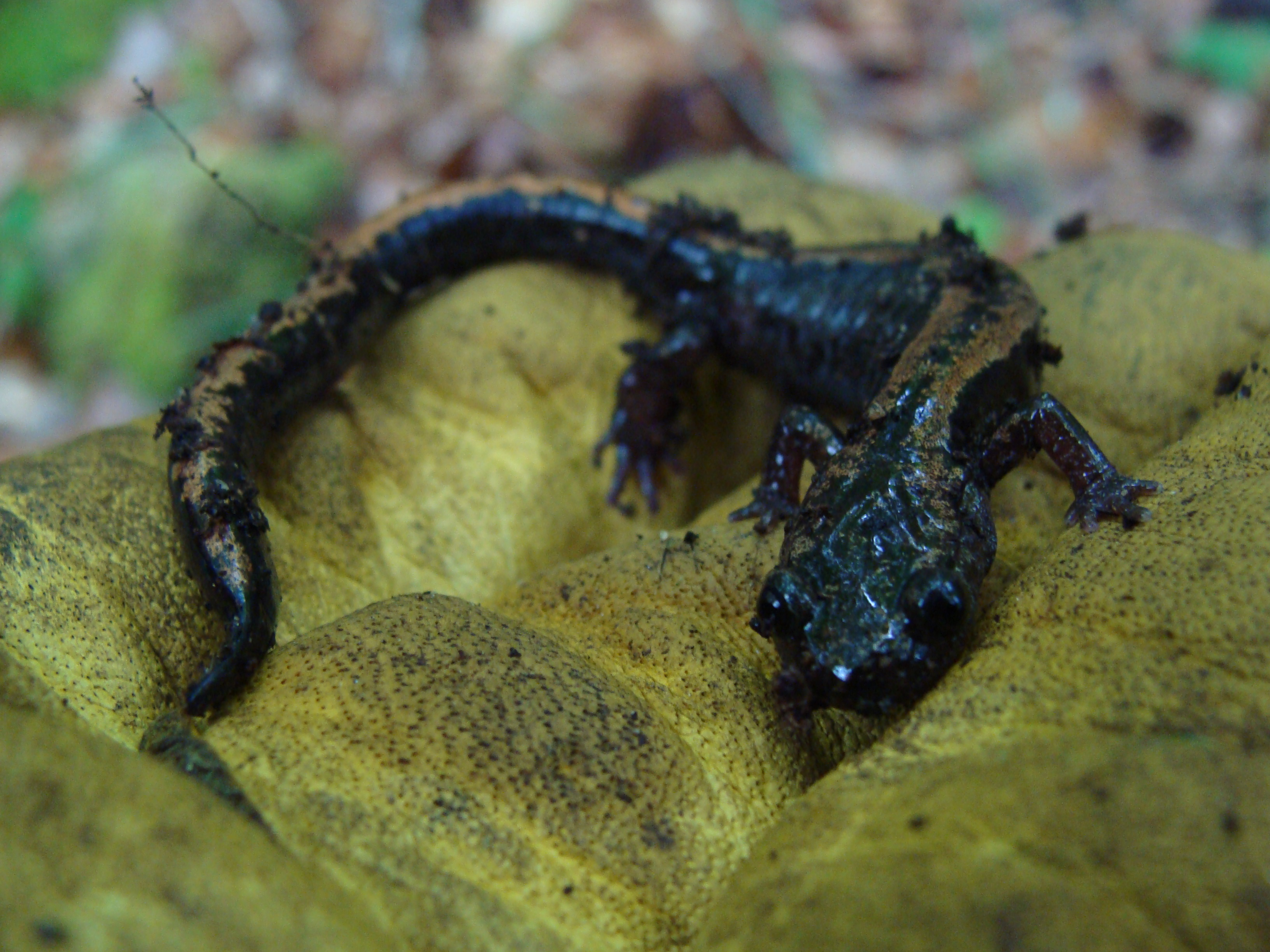
The gold-striped salamander, a native of the park, is highly dependent on clear, well-oxygenated streams in mountainous humid areas. Although common in Gerês, it is a vulnerable species regarding its distribution

Many of the studies conducted on the species that inhabitant the park have been concentrated in the area of Matas de Albergaria/Palheiros, traditionally identified as the "heart" of the park. Work by the Faculty of Sciences at the University of Porto and University of Minho have concentrated on a few mammals (Pyrenean desman, European otter, roe deer, and wild boar), reptiles and fish. These studies looked into the numbers of species and factors influencing their habitats.

Approximately 235 vertebrate species were identified within the boundaries of the park, of which 200 are threatened or under protection. These include three species of bat under pressure (of the eight that exist): greater horseshoe bat (Rhinolophus ferrumequinum), lesser horseshoe bat (Rhinolophus hipposideros) and Mediterranean horseshoe bat (Rhinoloplus euryale). Other species of particular importance: the Iberian shrew (Sorex granarius), the European pine marten (Martes martes), the European wildcat (Felis silvestris), the gold-striped salamander (Chioglossa lusitanica) and the snub-nosed viper (Vipera latastei). A few of the local species are protected by the Convention on the Conservation of European Wildlife and Natural Habitats. The red squirrel (Sciurus vulgaris) whose habitat is restricted and marginal in continental Portugal, is another species that is common to the park. After four centuries absent from Portuguese territory, its population began to be recorded in 1985–1986, in Viana do Castelo. There were also registered sightings in Albergaria, Lamas de Mouro and Serra da Paneda, while comparable encounters in Spain were identified across the border. Roe deer, which are a symbol of the park are encountered in prolific quantity, along the margins of the park, where they find shelter and food.

Meanwhile, other mammals, such as the population of Iberian wolf (Canis lupus signatus) have collapsed with human encroachment, while the number of exemplars are limited. Along with the golden eagle, the wolf was seen as a threat to livestock, and was almost hunted to extinction, although protected by law since the end of the 20th century. Brown bears disappeared from the region in the 17th century, and the extinct Portuguese ibex (Capra pyrenaica lusitanica), locally known as Gerês goat, was last seen in the 1890s. More than a century later, its vacant ecological niche was reoccupied naturally by Spanish ibex coming from Galicia, and their population numbered about 100 animals by 2011.

Worthy of mention are the Garrano (or Minho horse), a small equine landrace who were ancestors of the Galician pony and Andalusian horse, which mostly live in the wild, but are a gentle breed with no significant fear of humans. For a long time these horses permeated the farms of Vilarinho das Furnas (before it was inundated with the dam's construction), but later began to freely move between the Portuguese-Spanish border after 1979.

There are 147 avian species that are associated with the Peneda-Gerês park, especially along the Mourela region in the southern part of its frontier. In this region, although it might vary throughout the year (given climate and season), approximately 36 species make their nests in the area. Of particular note in this park are the: hen harrier (Circus cyaneus), European honey buzzard (Pernis apivorus), common snipe (Gallinago gallinago), red-backed shrike (Lanius collurio), yellowhammer (Emberiza citrinella), garden warbler (Sylvia borin) and whinchat (Saxicola rubetra). For the winchat, the area of Mourela is the unique nesting ground in Portugal, while the red-backed shrike and yellowhammer are limited to Castro Laboreiro plateau and northern corners of the park.

Also important to highlight is the gold-striped salamander (Chioglossa lusitanica) a species endemic to the northwest Iberian peninsula, typically associated with mountainous areas with elevated precipitation.

The waters of the park teem with various species, often called "Rios truteiros" (Trout Rivers) for the abundance of trout. Although stocks have diminished, the salmon populations still spawns in the rivers of the park.

Species well represented in the biotopes of Peneda-Gerês include:

- Pyrenean desman (Galemys pyrenaicus), commonly restricted to northern portions of the Iberian Peninsula and French Pyrenees;
- European otter (Lutra lutra), a carnivore well adapted to waters of the park, but in decline throughout Europe, it inhabits the watercourses and uses the banks for shelter;
- Iberian emerald lizard (Lacerta schreiberi), endemic to the western portions of the Iberian peninsula, it inhabits mountainous river valleys, where it is protected by vegetation;
- Iberian frog (Rana iberica), common to Portugal, northwestern Iberia, and mountainous lands

=== Ecoregions, zoning and management plan ===
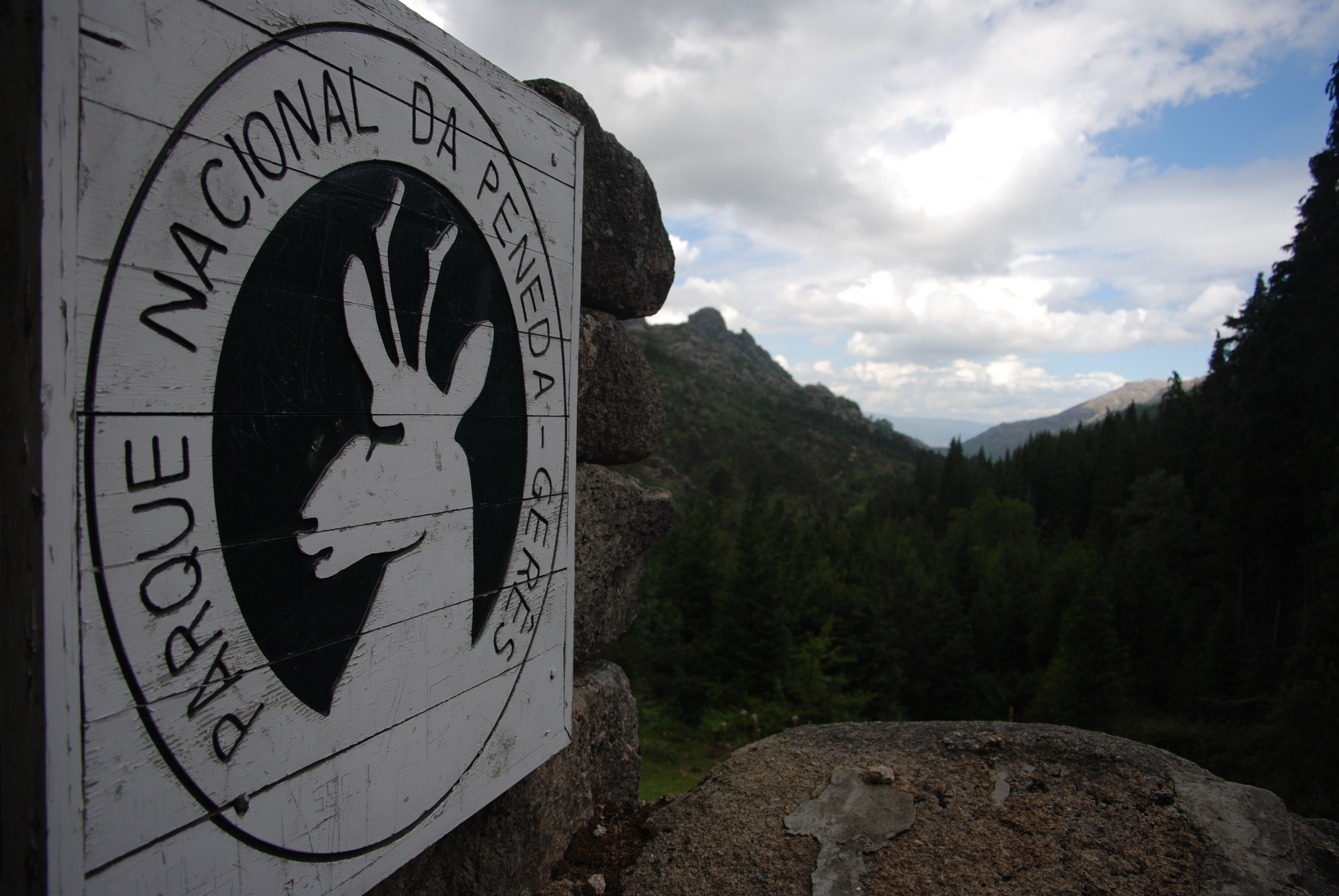
The Peneda-Gerês logo overlooking one of the scenic belvedres near Gerês

The 1971 classification of Peneda-Gerês as a national park came from a group of rules/requirements established to allow: the prudent use of the park's resources, preservation of existing flora and fauna species, allowing for the continued cohabitation, while providing an environment for scientific, educational and touristic investigation. These specified:

- Areas of Natural Environments (Portuguese: Áreas de Ambiente Natural), these were defined in 1991 into three zones:
  - Integrated reserves: to preserve habitats and natural elements that were unique, vulnerable, rare, threatened or representative;
  - Partial reserves: to allow conservation and environmental interpretation;
  - Complementary areas: a transition zones between natural and rural environments.
- Freshwater Environments (Portuguese: Ambientes Dulçaquícolas): to provide means of management and conservation that would allow the constant preservation of existing water-based environments. The park is located within mountainous granite geomorphology, characterized by narrow watercourses, irregular inclines and unmineralized, highly oxygenated, semi-acidic, cold waters, which are the base of the ecosystem. Its importance, therefore, resulted in three-level classification of freshwater environments characterized by the natural resources that existed, and those activities which were permitted in each environment.
- Sites of Ornithological Interest (Portuguese: Sítios de Interesse Orintológico): areas identified for avian species conservation were prepared by Neves et al.

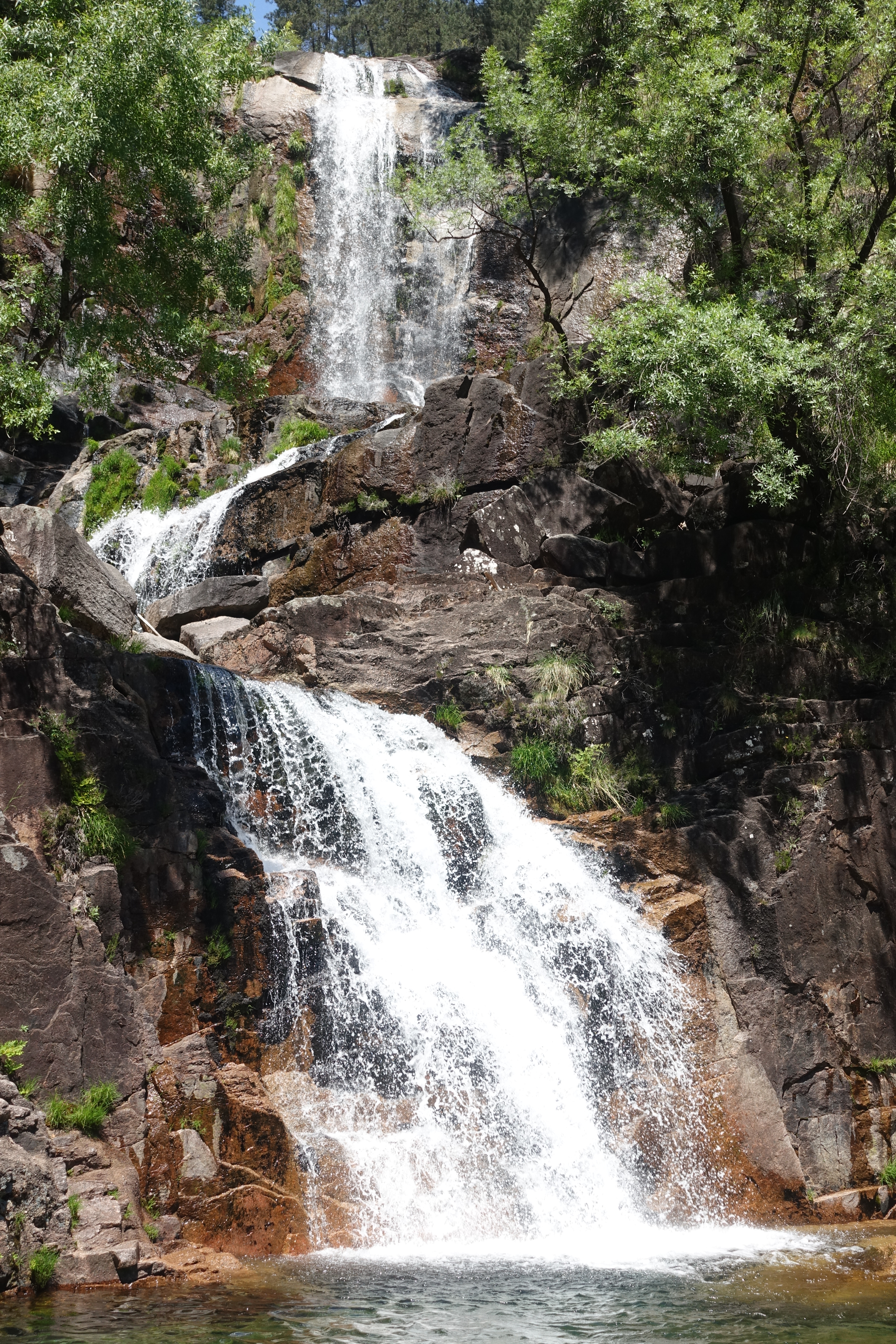
Waterfall

In 2011 a new management plan was published for Peneda-Gerês NP defining 5 levels of protection: total protection area, partial protection areas (levels I and II) and complementary protection areas (levels I and II). This management plan was based on a combination of biodiversity conservation and wilderness protection approaches. The plan was based on an up-to-date synthesis of all information and literature available about the protected area.

=== Human geography ===
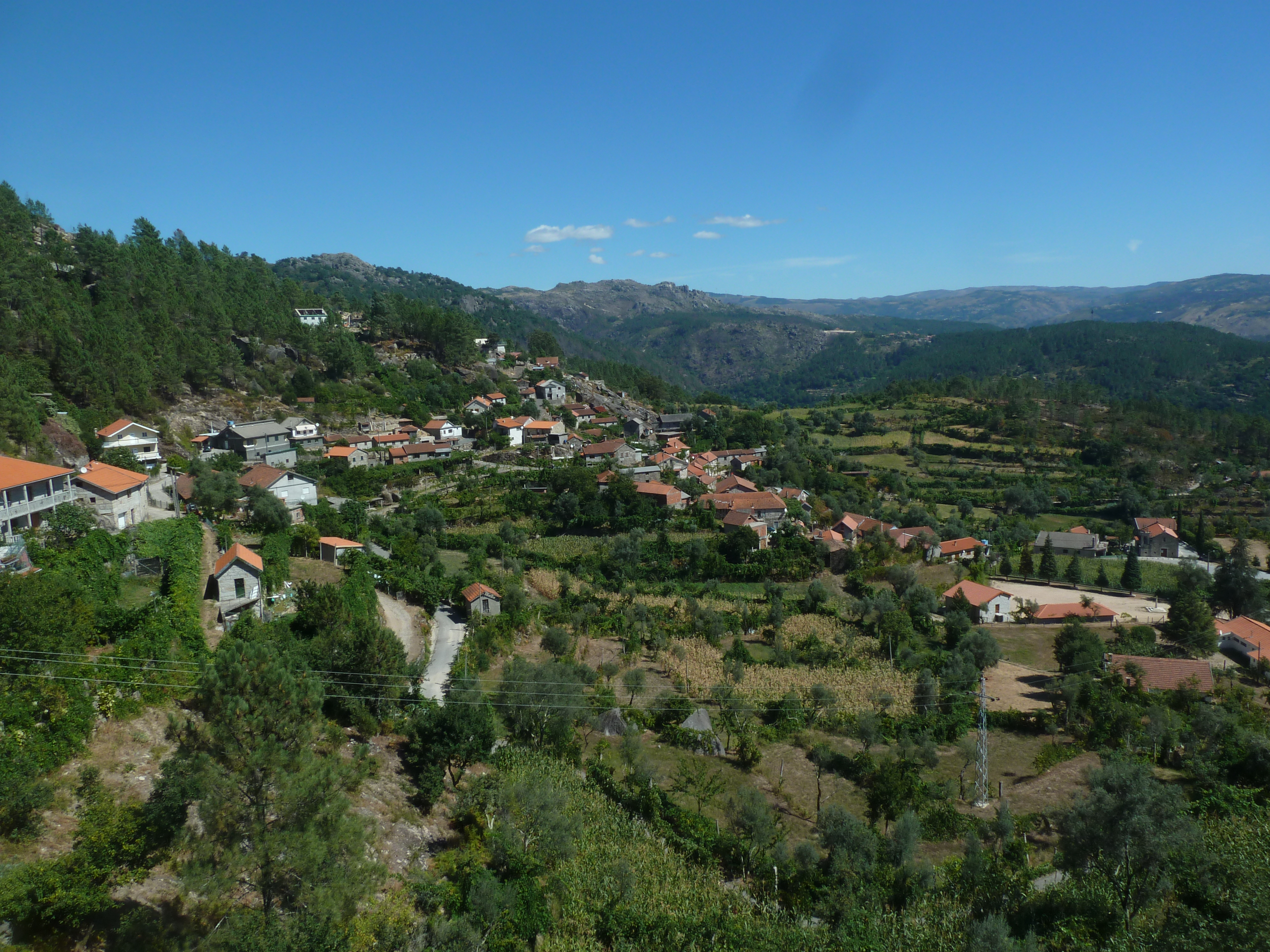
One of the settlements of Gerês

Although there has been variable growth throughout the Norte region, there has been a general population decrease in those administrative units that fell within the Peneda-Gerês National Park (1981–1991), in the municipalities of Melgaço (-16.8%), Arcos de Valdevez (-13.4%), Ponte da Barca(-6.1%), Terras de Bouro (-7.2%), and Montalegre (-20.3%). There was a population of 9,099 according to the 1991 census, a 16% decrease from the 10,849 registered in 1981. There are no positive-negative variations between civil parishes; of those civil parishes that fell within the PNPG authority, their populations dropped from 0.8% (Vilar da Veiga) to 38.6% (Sezelhe).

These residents are concentrated primarily in various agglomerations: small nuclei separated from each other; an extension of buildings located along roadways; some isolated groups; constructions along agricultural roads in pasturelands; and three or more homes isolated by pastures. Consequently, there are six homogeneous zones:

- Castro Laboreiro and Rio Laboreiro Valley - consisting of small agglomerations separated by short distances. It was still common practice for the residents of mountain communities to spend part of the year in two locations, primarily near Castro Laboreiro. From about Easter to about Christmas, residents would live in homes above 1,000 m above sea level, known as branda (from the Portuguese brando, meaning mild or gentle). In the remaining part of the year, these inhabitants would occupy homes in the river valley, known as inverneira (from the Portuguese Inverno, meaning winter);
- Serras da Peneda and Serras do Soajo - small pastoral agglomerations, with different summer and winter residences;
- Lima Valley and Serra Amarela - where the Lima Valley consists of two or more agglomerations connected by lines of residences between them, while in the Serra Amarela populations are concentrated in isolated pockets;
- Gerês Valley - development of tourism, around the Caniçada Dam and Thermal baths, resulted in uncontrolled re-construction, re-modelling and expansion of existing residences, although there already existed a tendency for expansion along the avenues and accessways along the valley;
- Cabril-Gerês - steep areas along the River Cávado and Salamonde Dam, where buildings are concentrated along the accessways, and Cabril River, with pasturelands located between agglomerations;
- Mourela/Barroso Plateau - extending south, southeast and southwest, the plateau is a series of agglomerations, connected by avenues of built-up occupation. The expansion of Várzea, owing to the construction of the Paradela Dam, resulted in the reduction of cultivatable lands, meadows and marshes.

Some of the villages in the high lands are located near the arable lands. Terraces, built to make better use of these scarce lands, and traditional houses, with granite walls and thatch roofs, shape the landscape in some of the most isolated villages such as Pitões das Júnias and Ermida.

== Research ==
Over the last 50 years, the Peneda-Gerês National Park has been one of the most important sites for ecological research in Portugal, but also for other natural and social sciences. A number of studies have been conducted from the Peneda Field Station in Castro Laboreiro run by Prof. Henrique M. Pereira. These studies have looked at patterns of species diversity at multiple scales and their response to the habitat composition of the landscape and multiple land-uses. They have also documented a new moth species for science in 2015, Isotrias penedana.

== Economy ==
The primary economic sector dominates the activities of residents that live within the park's territory. Although agricultural activity remains difficult, it still out-paces secondary and tertiary activities which, apart from the Terras de Bouro and Ponte da Barca, have been insignificant. The inaccessibility and diminished exterior investment potential, has concentrated those activities in the region primarily in the exploration of forestry, the support of hydro-electrical generation and tourism. But this too is limited; tourism is concentrated generally in the vicinity of Caldas do Gerês, hydro-electrical transmission has not affected the local economy, and along with forestry, has not seen an appreciable re-investment or re-capitalization of wealth (with income generated transferred outside the local market).

The primary sector, although the largest contributor, is subsistence at best: supported by an ageing (mostly female) population; individual parcels are small and over-subdivided; producers that support familial or local clients; a production that is primarily concentrated on personal consumption; poor commercial networks; and physical and social isolation, with limited educational supports. Between 60 and 70% of the production is supported by subsidies.

Industrial activities in the civil parishes within the park are poorly diversified and support familial businesses. Civil construction, although one of the larger economic supporters, has little effect on local incomes, since a majority of the employed come from outside the region. Although there are a few larger operations (bread-making, construction and saw-milling/carpentry) most are small owner-operators, that support local consumption or occasional sales. Frequently, artisanal producers have disappeared, and have not been replaced by mass-produced or comparable vendors.

Similarly, tertiary activities are limited small operators; commonly poorly diversified, dominated by commercial establishments and focused on local consumption, they are operated by families and do not generate much in employment. Cafés and restaurants, are a good example of entrepreneurship, with many dotting the settlement landscape of the park's limits, primarily in the area of Gerês. Other service sector activities are concentrated within the urbanized municipal seats and larger villages, with many of the more dynamic nuclei the centre of postal services, banks, posts for the G.N.R. or health centres.

== Barroso Agro-sylvo-pastoral System ==
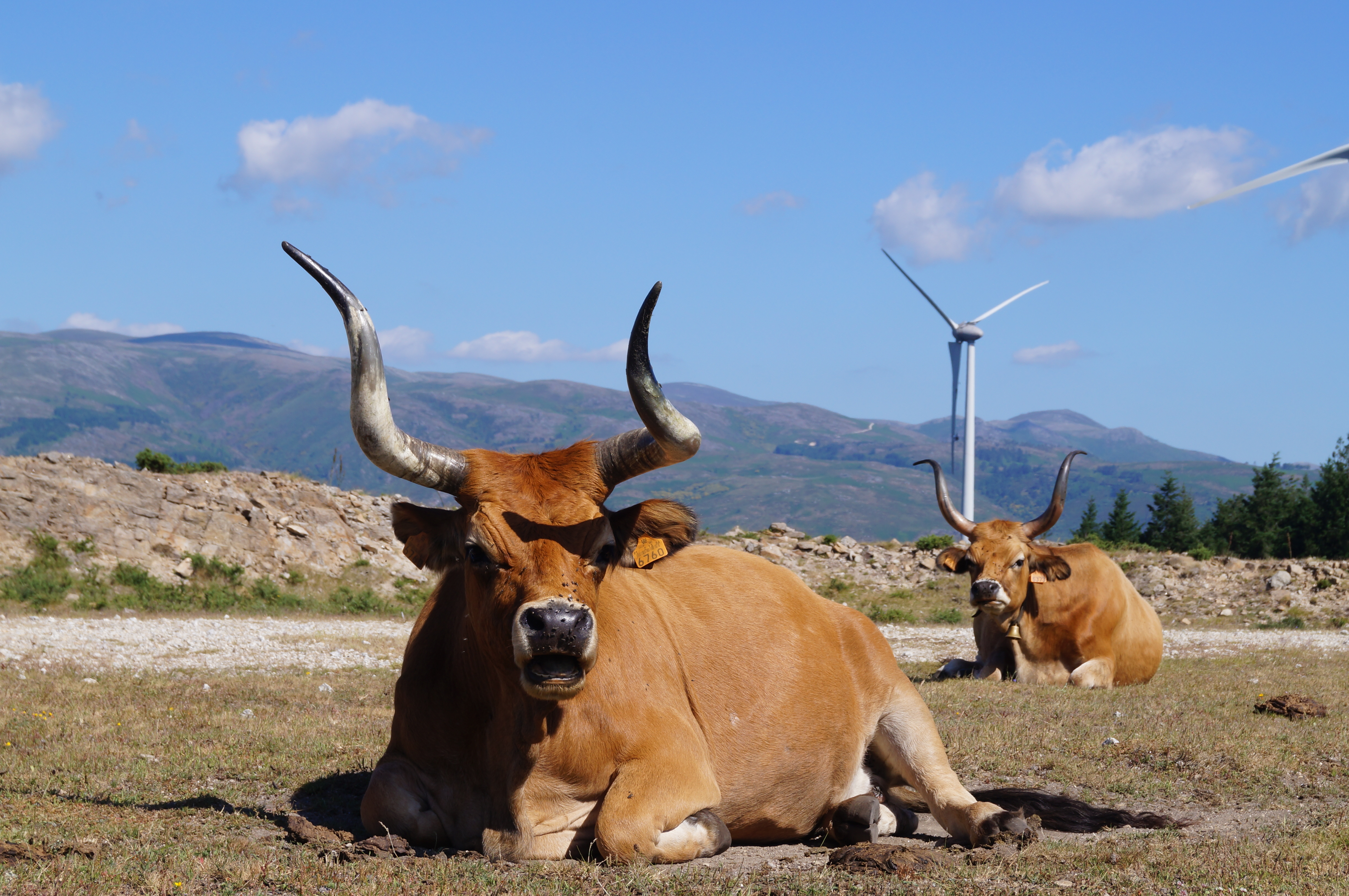
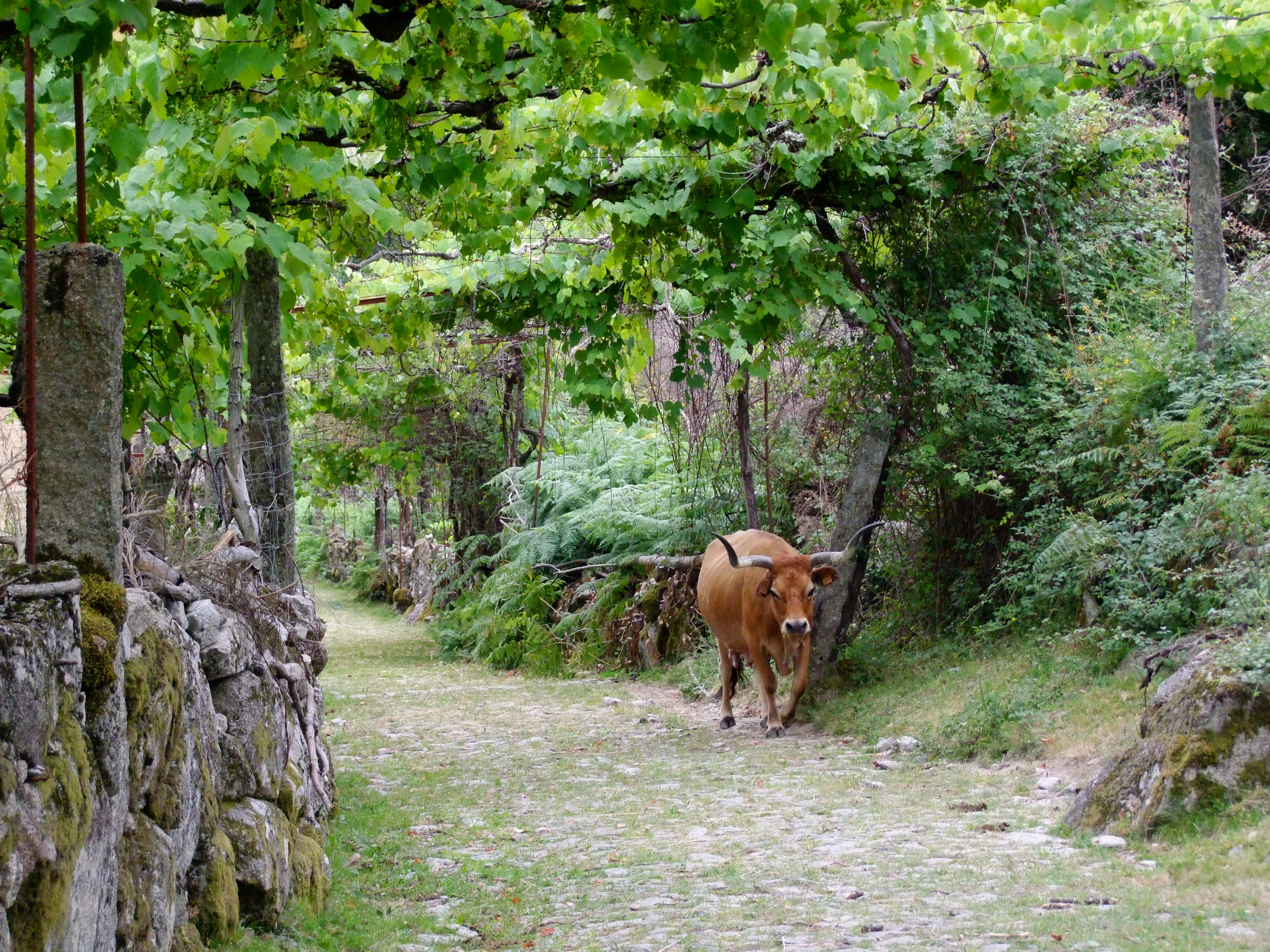
The Cachena and Barrosã breeds. The latter has protected geographical status of DOC

In 2018 the Barroso Agro-sylvo-pastoral System (BASP) where trees are cultivated alongside crops was amongst the first European sites designated as 'Globally Important Agricultural Heritage System' (GIAHS) by the United Nations Food and Agriculture Organization. The BASP is integrated into the Peneda-Gerês National Park as it is farming in harmony with nature. Of the 57 GIAHS that existed in the world 2018, only six were designated in Europe. The autochthonous Barrosã cattle with long curved horns, which can grow well over 100 cm in length. The animals graze freely on traditional pastures and marshes in conditions that are ideal for their welfare. The cattle enjoy a purity of nature that is characteristic of these places, contributing greatly to the preservation and biodiversity of the landscape as well as to the rural economic sustainability. Barrosã cattle have been extensively studied because of their ancient genetic heritage.

== Tourism ==
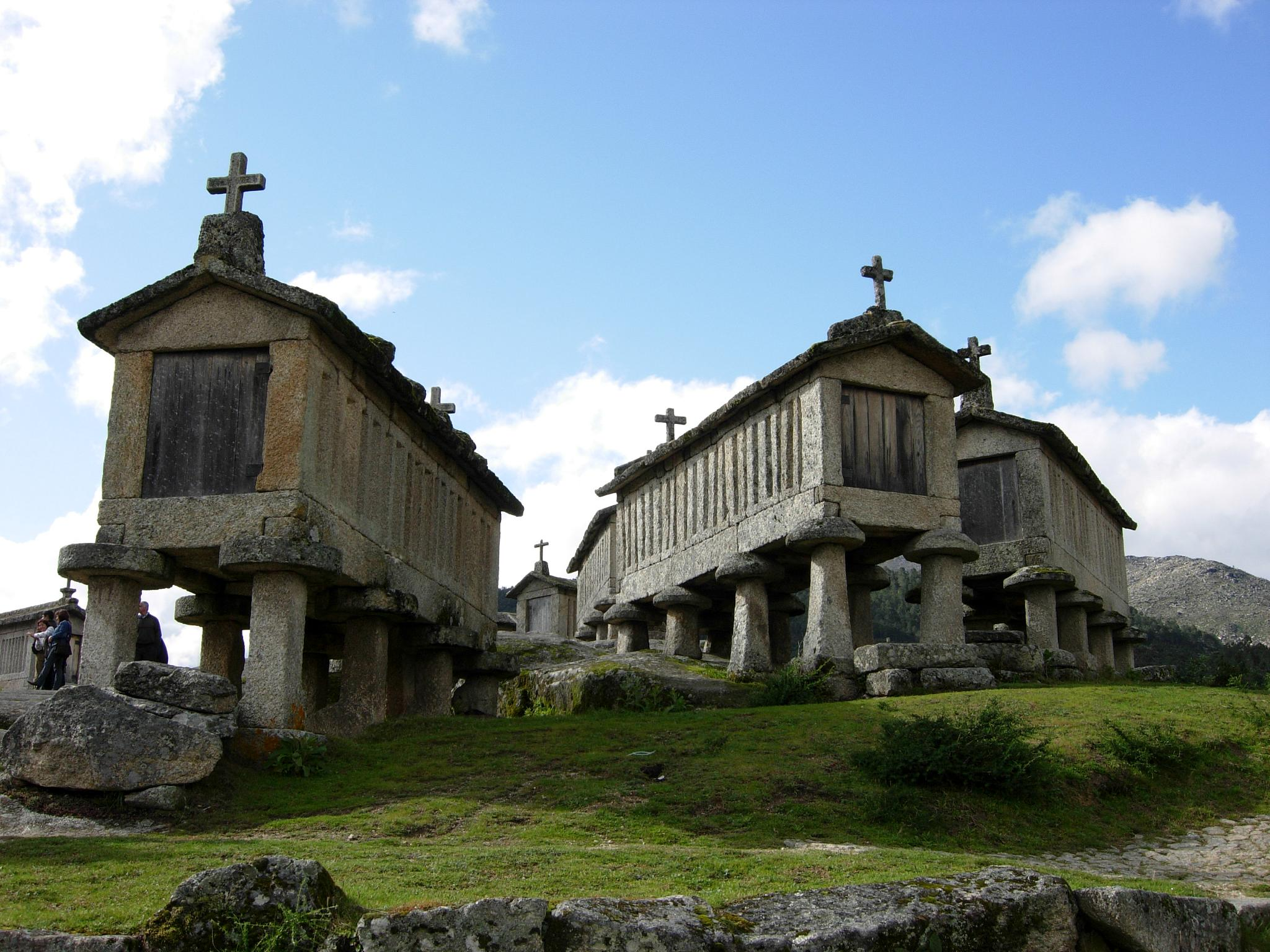
The Espigueiros of Soajo are 24 granite granaries classified as property of public interest.

The park tries to simultaneously encourage and control tourism, since the park's nature would not resist a massive flow of tourists. Accordingly, there are six small camping sites and several hiking trails are marked, making it relatively easy to find many of the most interesting spots, such as the castros at Castro Laboreiro and Calcedónia and the monastery at Pitões das Júnias. The trail at Mézio as a particular concern in describing some of the local features.

Locations near the few major roads are the most visited. Many of them are related to the religiousness of the people in northern Portugal namely the shrines at Senhora da Peneda and São Bento da Porta Aberta. Others, such as Soajo and Lindoso, display small, traditional granaries built of granite, the espigueiros (from the Portuguese espiga, meaning spike/ear)). Soajo is a typical Portuguese village, located on one of the slopes of Peneda Mountains. The 24 espigueiros were erected on a granite slab and are still used today for drying corn.

Some of the two most known and visited features are the many waterfalls, including the one near the old frontier station at Portela do Homem, and the Vilarinho das Furnas village, whenever the Vilarinho das Furnas Dam is low enough, and the cascades along the Arado river.

The domestic animals also deserve being noted. The autochthonous Barrosã and the smaller Cachena cattle, used in agriculture, is nowadays endangered because it is losing its utility; as is also the Castro Laboreiro dog, a hunting dog.
