= Arado River =

River in northern Portugal

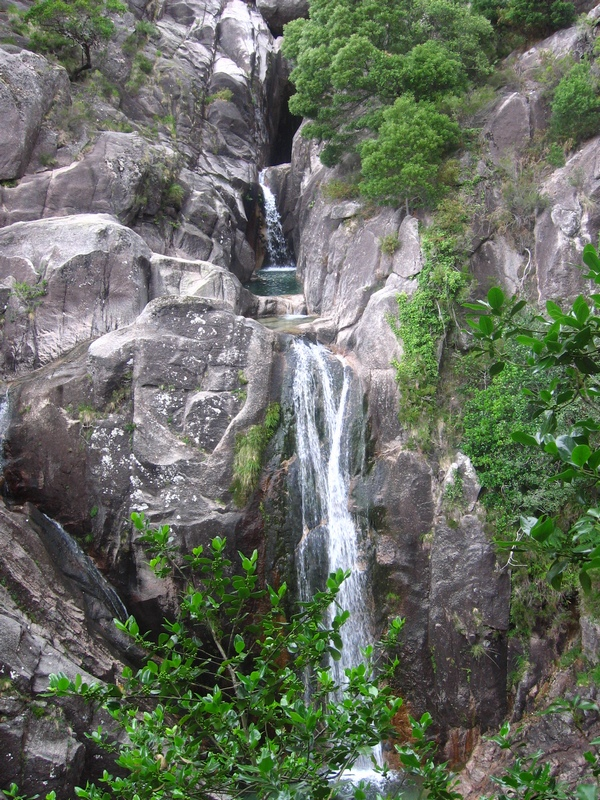
- Waterfall on the Arado

Location
- Country: Portugal
- districts: Braga, Vila Real District
- Towns/Villages: Ermida, Fafião

Physical characteristics
- Source
  - location: Gerês Mountain, Portugal
- Mouth: Mouth
  - location: Fafião River, Portugal
- Length: 5 km (3.1 mi)

The Arado river originates in the surroundings of Curral do Camalhão, Gerês mountain range, north of the Teixeira valley and flows into the Fafião river after the Cascatas de Fecha be Barjas, parish of Cabril, municipality of Montalegre, district of Vila Real, in the north of Portugal. It lies within the Peneda-Gerês National Park.
