= Garrano =

Portuguese breed of horse

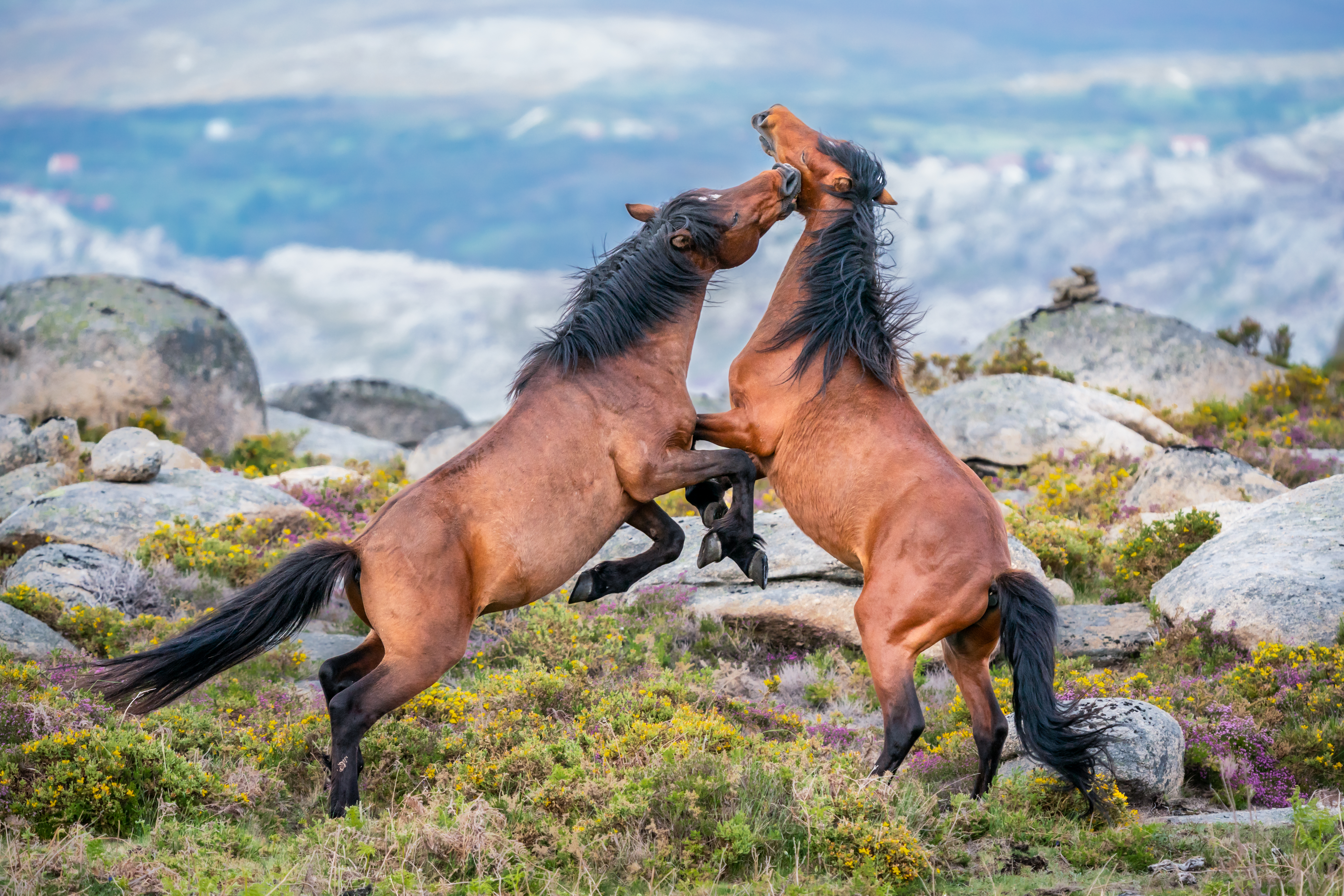
- Stallions fighting in Peneda-Gerês National Park

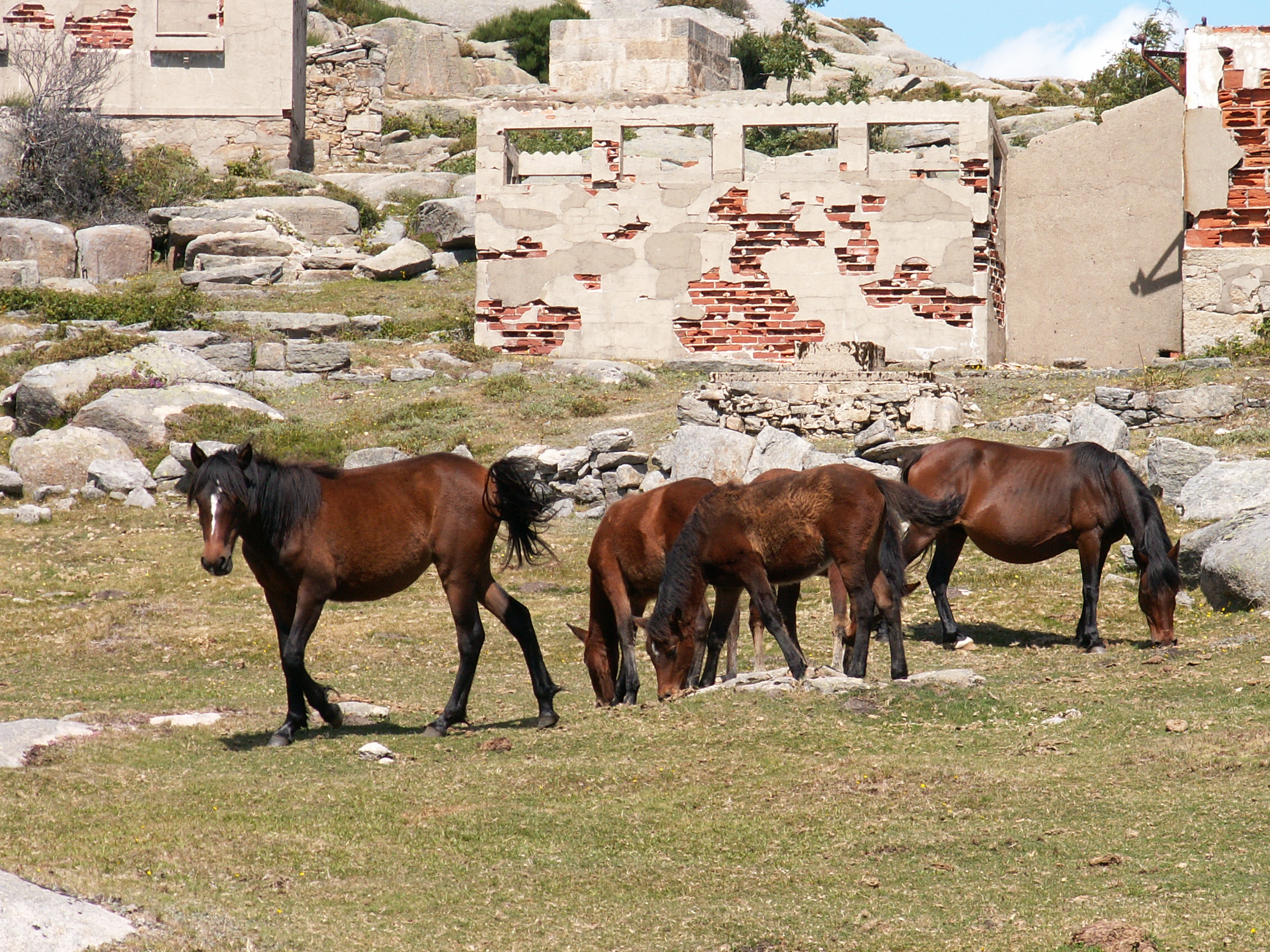
- At the Minas dos Carris, in the Peneda-Gerês National Park
- Conservation status: FAO (2007): endangered-maintained; DAD-IS (2024): at risk/endangered-maintained
- Other names: Raça Garrana
- Country of origin: Portugal
- Standard: Associação de Criadores de Equinos da Raça Garrana

Traits
- Weight: Male: 350 kg; Female: 300 kg
- Height: Male: 128 cm; Female: 120 cm

The Garrano or Raça Garrana is a Portuguese breed of small horse. It is distributed principally in the North Region of Portugal, and is equivalent to the Faco Galego of Galicia in north-western Spain, which lies immediately to the north.

It is one of four Portuguese breeds, the others being the Lusitano, the Sorraia and the Pónei da Terceira.

== History ==
On the Serra da Groba

The Garrano falls within the Celtic group of Iberian horse breeds, and is genetically close to other Celtic breeds such as the Connemara, the Exmoor Pony and the Shetland. Horses of this type are thought to have been introduced to the north-western Iberian Peninsula by migrating Celts in the sixth or seventh century BC; these people probably had trade relations with other Celtic populations in Brittany and Ireland.

A breed association, the Associação de Criadores de Equinos da Raça Garrana, was formed within the farmers' co-operative of Vieira do Minho in 1988; in 1990 it became independent, and in 1995 received official government approval. The breed standard was drawn up in 1993.

The Garrano is distributed principally in the North Region of Portugal. It is found in the concelhos of Amares, Arcos de Valdevez, Cabeceiras de Basto, Caminha, Melgaço, Monção, Paredes de Coura, Ponte da Barca, Ponte de Lima, Póvoa de Lanhoso, Terras de Bouro, Valença, Viana do Castelo, Vieira do Minho, Vila Nova de Cerveira and Vila Verde in the province of Minho and of Montalegre in the Trás-os-Montes. Within the Peneda-Gerês National Park, the horses are present on about 97% of the total land area, including the plateaux of Castro Laboreiro and Mourela and the four principal mountain formations, the Serra Amarela, the Serra do Gerês, the Serra da Peneda and the Serra do Soajo. The horses are also seen on other mountain massifs outside the limits of the park, including the Serra de Arga, the Serra da Cabreira, the Serra de Monção, the Serra de Paredes de Coura and the Serra de Santa Luzia in Minho, and the Serra do Larouco in Trás-os-Montes.

In 2019 the population registered in the herd-book included 335 stallions and almost 2000 breeding mares, in the hands of approximately 700 breeders. By 2024 the number of mares had risen to over 2550, of which about 1700 were pure-bred.

== Characteristics ==
The Garrano is small, with an average height at the withers of about 125 cm for stallions and some 120 cm for mares. Average weights are 350 kg and 300 kg respectively. The coat is commonly bay, often of a dark shade, and is usually without white markings. The facial profile is straight or slightly concave and the mane and tail are thick and black. The horses often have an additional gait – the passo travado – in addition to the usual walk, trot and canter.

== Use ==
Most horses are managed extensively, as a self-sufficient semi-feral population in the mountains of the North Region. They naturally form independent harems usually consisting of one stallion and a number of mares – approximately twenty on average. The harems are rounded up once a year and the colt foals are separated out and later sold. The small number of stabled horses may be used for farm work, or raced – either at the passo travado or at the canter.
