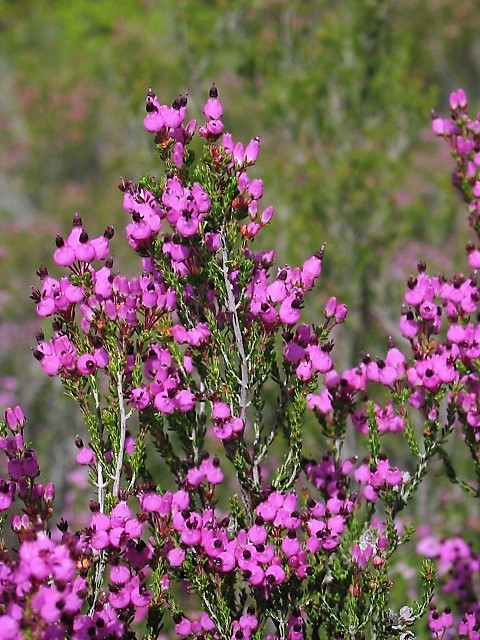

Scientific classification
- Kingdom: Plantae
- Clade: Tracheophytes
- Clade: Angiosperms
- Clade: Eudicots
- Clade: Asterids
- Order: Ericales
- Family: Ericaceae
- Genus: Erica
- Species: E. umbellata

Binomial name
- Erica umbellata L.

Synonyms
- Erica lentiformis Salisb.; Erica umbellata major Coss. ex Bourg.; Erica umbellata subsp. major (Coss. ex Bourg.) P. Silva & Teles; Gypsocallis umbellata (L.) D. Don; Ericodes umbellatum (L.) Kuntze; Erica umbellata f. albiflora D. C. Mc Clint.

= Erica umbellata =

Species of plant

Erica umbellata is a species of plant in the heather family (Ericaceae) native to the western Iberian Peninsula and northwestern Maghreb.

== Description ==
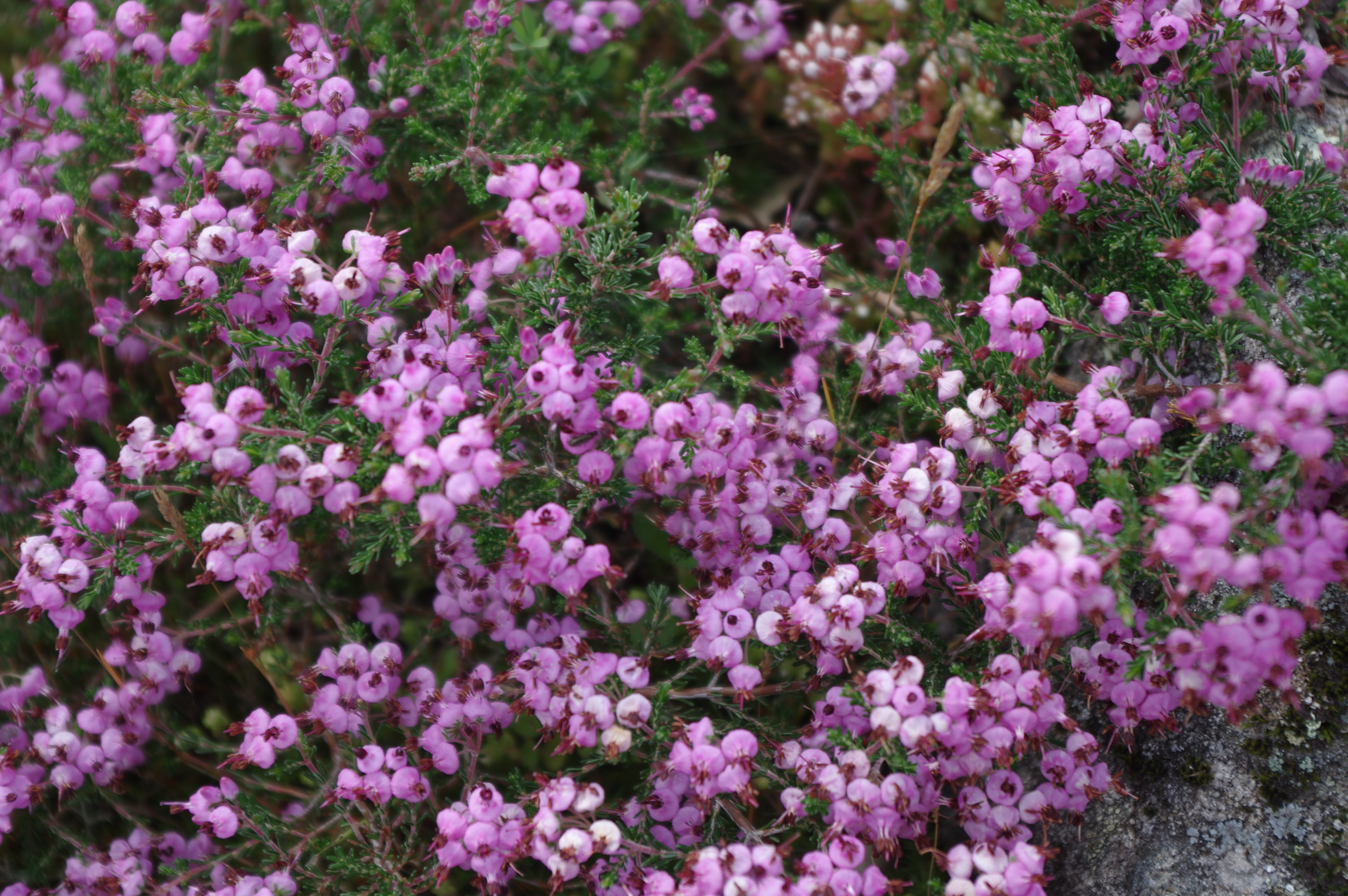
Erica umbellata on Citânia de Briteiros

Erica umbellata is a 10 to 50 cm (3.9 to 19.7 in) bush. It has young stems with barely marked ribs and reddish-brown bark. It has terminal inflorescences, umbelliform, with 3-6 flowers, without involvement of basal bracteoles. Seeds are ellipsoidal and 0.5–0.6 mm (0.020–0.024 in) long. The corolla is 3.5–5.5 mm (0.14–0.22 in) intensely pink or purple, occasionally albino.

== Distribution and habitat ==
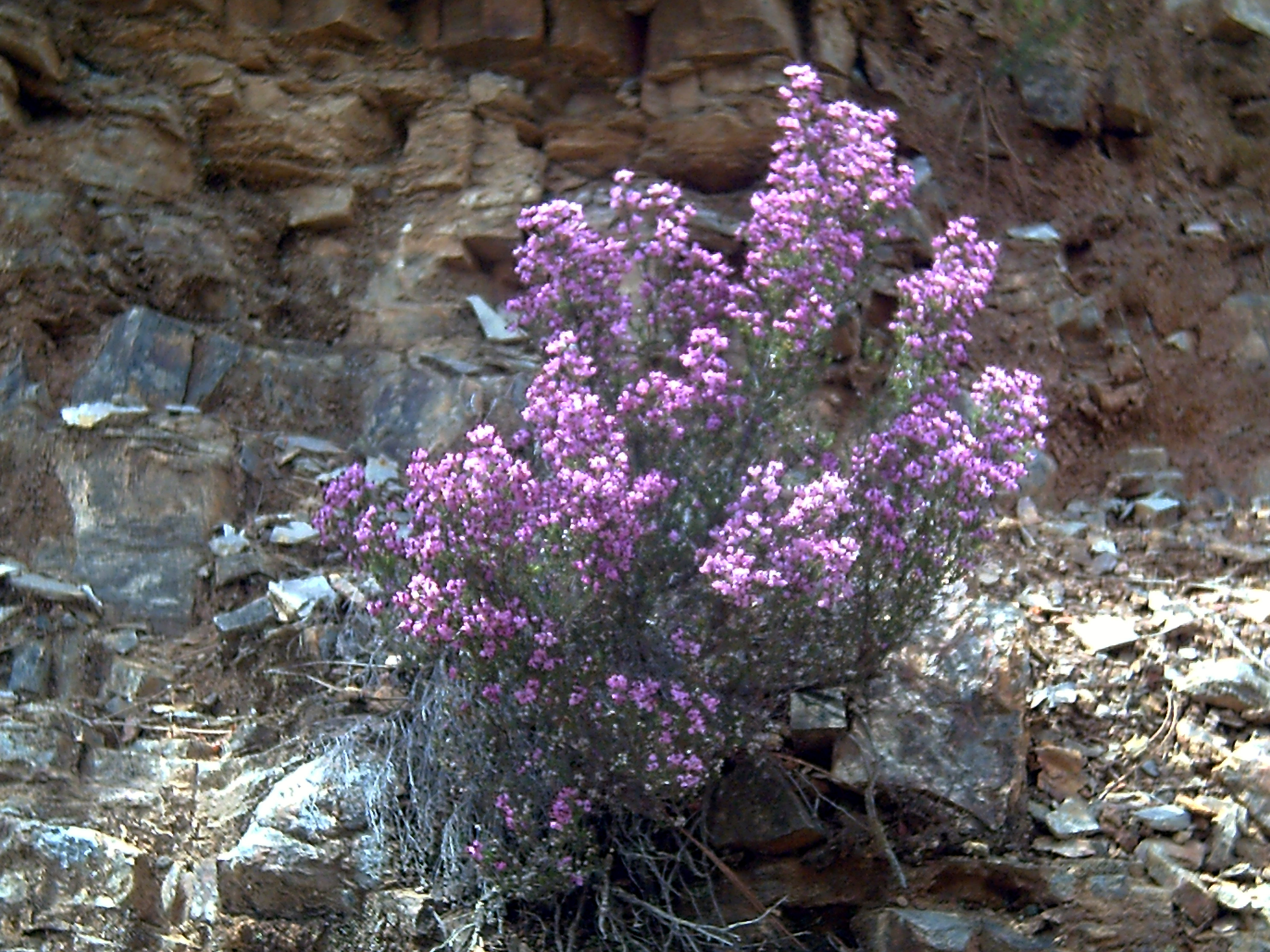
Erica umbellata on a siliceous soil

Erica umbellata is native to the western Iberian Peninsula (Portugal and western Spain) and northwest Africa in Morocco. Inhabiting bare terrain, dwarf or cleared heaths, scrublands, cleared forests, pine forests and subcoastal sand, always on siliceous soils, from sea-level to 1,500 m (4,900 ft) altitude. Some populations in the Algarve have very large flowers (up to 7 mm (0.28 in)) and were denominated var. major. Galician plants with graceful stems and small flowers were described as var. filiformis. Rarely some plants appear with rudimentary or aborted stamens (var. Anandra). E. umbellata can grow well on limey soils.
