= Henrique M. Pereira =

- Born: 28 May 1972 (age 54)
- Education: University of Lisbon; Stanford University
- Scientific career
- Fields: Conservation biology
- Workplaces: Martin Luther University of Halle-Wittenberg
- Website: Biodiversity Conservation at iDiv

Henrique Miguel Leite de Freitas Pereira (born 28 May 1972, Angola) is a Portuguese conservation biologist. He is a professor at the Martin Luther University of Halle-Wittenberg in Germany, head of the Biodiversity Conservation research group at the German Centre for Integrative Biodiversity Research (iDiv), and Chair of the Portugal Infrastructures Biodiversity Chair at CIBIO-InBIO, University of Porto. From 2014 to 2020 he was the Chair of the Group on Earth Observations Biodiversity Observation Network GEO BON. He is an avid and vocal supporter of the Sporting Football Club.

== Education ==
Pereira was educated at the Instituto Superior Técnico and University of Lisbon where he was awarded a Bachelor in Electrical and Computer Engineering in 1995, and a Master in Biophysics in 1998. He was awarded a PhD on Spatial models in animal behavior and ecology in 2002 from Stanford University for research supervised by Joan Roughgarden. In 2011, Pereira acquired his Habilitation at the University of Lisbon in the field of Ecology.

== Career and Research ==
Pereira was an assistant professor at the Instituto Superior Técnico of Lisbon before his nomination as director of the Peneda-Gerês National Park in Northern Portugal from 2006 to 2009. The following year, he established the Theoretical Ecology and Global Change Biology research group at the Center for Environmental Biology of the University of Lisbon. In 2013, Pereira moved to Leipzig and became a professor of Biodiversity Conservation at the Martin-Luther-Universität Halle-Wittenberg at the newly established German Centre for Integrative Biodiversity Research (iDiv).

His research revolves around the patterns and processes of global biodiversity change, including monitoring schemes and future scenarios for biodiversity and ecosystem services. In 2013, he proposed the concept of the Essential Biodiversity Variables together with other scientists from the GEO BON network and has been advocating for the adoption of this concept for global biodiversity conservation policies. He was elected chair and co-chair of GEO BON in 2014 and 2017 respectively. He supports the adoption of data-sharing culture and policies to foster research and to develop species conservation measures.

He also investigates the evidences for nature recovery after farmland abandonment in Europe and rewilding as means of restoring degraded ecosystems and enhancing ecosystem services. From 2012 to 2016 he was a supervisory board member of the Rewilding Europe Foundation.

Pereira dedicates a large part of his scientific career to the Science-Policy interface and dialogues with stakeholders. He participated in the global Millennium Ecosystem Assessment, and from 2003 to 2006 he coordinated the Portugal Millennium Ecosystem Assessment. From 2014 to 2016 he was Coordinating Lead Author of the Methodological Assessment on Scenarios and Models of the Intergovernmental Platform on Biodiversity and Ecosystem Services (IPBES) before being nominated co-chair of the IPBES Expert Group on Scenarios and Models from 2016 to 2019. He was also one of the lead authors of the fourth Global Biodiversity Outlook, the flagship publication of the Convention on Biological Diversity, which provided a mid-term assessment of progress towards the implementation of the Strategic Plan for Biodiversity 2011–2020.

== Prizes and awards ==
In 2006, Pereira was awarded the Zayed International Prize for the Environment, as one of the coordinating lead authors of the Millennium Ecosystem Assessment, as well as Top+ Professors Board at Instituto Superior Técnico as one of the professors with best “Global Appreciation” by students in the 2005-2006 pedagogic surveys. In 2010, Pereira further received the Honor Mention of the Banco Espirito Santo Biodiversity Prize for his work as the coordinator of the Portugal Millennium Ecosystem Assessment.

== Selected publications ==
- Perino, A., Pereira, H. M., Navarro, L. M., Fernandez, N. et al. (2019). Rewilding complex ecosystems. Science 364(6438), 351. doi:10.1126/science.aav5570
- Navarro, L. M., Fernández, N., Guerra, C., Guralnick, R., Kissling, W. D., Londoño, M. C., Muller-Karger, F., Turak, E., Balvanera, P., Costello, M. J., Delavaud, A., El Serafy, G., Ferrier, S., Geijzendorffer, I., Geller, G. N., Jetz, W., Kim, E.-S., Kim, H., Martin, C. S., McGeoch, M. A., Mwampamba, T. H., Nel, J. L., Nicholson, E., Pettorelli, N., Schaepman, M. E., Skidmore, A., Sousa Pinto, I., Vergara, S., Vihervaara, P., Xu, H., Yahara, T., Gill, M. and Pereira, H. M. (2017): Monitoring biodiversity change through effective global coordination. Current Opinion in Environmental Sustainability 29, 158–169. doi: 10.1016/j.cosust.2018.02.005
- Pereira, H. M., Ferrier, S., Walters, M., Geller, G. N. et al. (2013) Essential Biodiversity Variables. Science 339, 277–278. doi:10.1126/science.1229931
- Navarro, L. M. & Pereira, H. M. (2012) Rewilding abandoned landscapes in Europe. Ecosystems 15. 900–912. doi:10.1007/s10021-012-9558-7.x
- Pereira, H. M.; Navarro, L. M.; Martins, I. S. S. (2012). "Global Biodiversity Change: The Bad, the Good, and the Unknown". Annual Review of Environment and Resources. 37: 25–50. doi:10.1146/annurev-environ-042911-093511. S2CID 154898897.
- Pereira, H. M., Leadley, P. W., Proenca, V., Alkemade, R., Scharlemann, J. P. W., Fernandez-Manjarres, J. F., Araujo, M. B., Balvanera, P., Biggs, R., Cheung, W. W. L., Chini, L., Cooper, H. D., Gilman, E. L., Guenette, S., Hurtt, G. C., Huntington, H. P., Mace, G. M., Oberdorff, T., Revenga, C., Rodrigues, P., Scholes, R. J., Sumaila, U. R. & Walpole, M. (2010) Scenarios for Global Biodiversity in the 21st Century. Science 330, 1496–1502. doi: 10.1126/science.1196624.
