= List of religious buildings in Guimarães =

Guimarães, the first capital city of Portugal, was one of the first reconquered regions of the Reconquista, allowing for a wider time period for religion to settle and root into the lives of those living in it.

This list comprises the religions buildings inside the Concelho of Guimarães, divided by the Freguesias they are located in and sorted by alphabetical order.

== Abação e Gémeos ==
Name	Description	Image	Construction	Coordinates
Abação Parish Church	The Igreja Paroquial de Abação, also known as the Igreja de São Tomé, follows the baroque style and is adorned with blue azulejos. Above the main entrance, the year 1749 is inscribed on the upper section of the granite portal.		1749	41.40975°N 8.27204°W
Gémeos Calvary	Granite calvary monument in Gémeos.		1700s/1800s	41.40090°N 8.25799°W
Gémeos Parish Church	The Igreja Paroquial de Gémeos, or Igreja de Santa Maria, is a 19th-century church located in the village of Gémeos.		1800s	41.39861°N 8.25648°W
Saint Christopher Church (Igreja de São Cristovão)	The Saint Christopher Church used to serve the freguesia of São Cristovão, extinct in 1911. Its currently located in the union of Abação e Gémeos.		1700s/1800s	41.40199°N 8.26875°W

== Azurém ==
Name	Description	Image	Construction	Coordinates
Chapel of Our Lady of the Conception	The Capela de Nossa Senhora da Conceição is a 17th-century baroque chapel built in 1699 and deeply restored in the 1700s. It plays a significant role in the Novenas of the Nicolinas festivities.		1699	41.44845°N 8.30388°W
Our Lady of the Conception Church	The Igreja de Nossa Senhora da Conceição is a 21st-century church built between May 2004 and September 2005. The masses of the Novenas of the Nicolinas festivities are done here.		2004	41.44839°N 8.30316°W

== Costa ==
Name	Description	Image	Construction	Coordinates
Penha Sanctuary	Church at the summit of the Penha Mountain built over a series of phases starting in 1931 and ending fully in 1949, suffering some minor changes later as well.	Penha Sanctuary	1931	41.43179°N 8.26984°W
Santa Catarina Chapel (Capela de Santa Catarina)	A small chapel, hidden inside the Penha Mountain's woods. Huge granite boulders retain the nave of this chapel. It has a portable carved pulpit in the shape of a chalice. It is likely that this temple was built between the 15th and 16th centuries. The latest interventions fully restored the chapel and its surroundings.		1400s/1500	41.42893°N 8.26872°W

== Longos ==
Name	Description	Image	Construction	Coordinates
Santa Maria Madalena Church	Rococo church whose construction began in 1694. It was partially destroyed in the 1755 Lisbon earthquake and rebuilt by architect André Soares.		1756	41.52197°N 8.38766°W
Santa Marta do Leão Chapel	Early 20th century chapel located right next to the border between the municipalities of Guimarães and Braga, however it is fully located in the freguesia of Longos.		1917	41.51880°N 8.39176°W

== Oliveira, São Paio e São Sebastião ==
Name	Description	Image	Construction	Coordinates
Albergaria of Saint Crispin	A albergaria is a type of shelter for the poor. The Albergaria of Saint Crispin was built in 1315 and reconstructed in the 1600s.		1315	41.44230°N 8.29410°W
Chapel of Our Lady of Guidance	The Chapel of Our Lady of Guidance or Capela de Nossa Senhora da Guia, built after the previous one, located up the street in one of the medieval towers of the Walls of Guimarães, was demolished in the last quarter of the 18th century. It follows the baroque style and it was inaugurated in August 1793.		1793	41.44254°N 8.29195°W
Chapel of the Holy Cross	The Capela de Santa Cruz, built in 1639, is a small chapel located next to the Paço dos Duques with a stone calvary from 1640 in front.		1639	41.44634°N 8.29014°W
Chapel of the Venerable Third Order of St. Dominic	In Portuguese, the Capela da Venerável Ordem Terceira de São Domingos, is a chapel built between 1741 and 1800. It follows the Rococo architecture.		1741	41.44214°N 8.29713°W
Church of Our Lady of the Olive Tree (Igreja de Nossa Senhora da Oliveira)	Founded as a double monastery in about 949 by Countess Mumadona Dias, it was later donated to the Catholic Church by King Ramiro II. Around 1139, the monastery was turned into a collegiate church, the Colegiada de Nossa Senhora da Oliveira. The collegiate church was shut down in 1911, but reopened in 1967.		949	41.44295°N 8.29263°W
Church of São Miguel do Castelo	Romanesque medieval church where Afonso Henriques is said to have been baptized.	Church of São Miguel do Castelo	Before 1216	41.44726°N 8.29102°W
Our Lady of Guidance Calvary	16th-century Manueline granite cross formerly named after Our Lady of Piety, in accordance with the representation of the Pietà depicted there. It consists of a pyramidal base on which stands a faceted shaft, with a capital topped by a faceted cross, surrounded at its base by a sculptural group representing the Descent from the Cross. It’s a National Monument since 1910 and it was moved to its current location in the 1930s.		1500s	41.44269°N 8.29250°W
Recolhimento das Trinas	Convent and female hospice from the 17th century.		1653	41.44507°N 8.29347°W
Saint Peter's Basilica	The St. Peter's Basilica is a Catholic church built following the neoclassical style. Located at the Toural, it receive the title of minor basilica by Pope Benedict XIV in 1751.		1785	41.44169°N 8.29594°W
Santos Passos Church	The Santos Passos Church is an 18th-century Portuguese baroque church located at the Campo da Feira.		1769	41.44090°N 8.28971°W

== Serzedo ==
Name	Description	Image	Construction	Coordinates
Senhora do Amparo Chapel	Late 16th century gothic chapel. In March 1598, permission was granted for Mass to be celebrated here. It is located next to the Quinta da Torre, a 20th-century house built in 1937.		Late 1500s	41.39767°N 8.22423°W

== Tabuadelo ==
Name	Description	Image	Construction	Coordinates
Tabuadelo Parish Church	Also known as Church of Saint Cyprian, it is a 14th-century church in Tabuadelo that suffered big alterations at the start of the 18th century.		1300s	41.40067°N 8.29085°W

== Urgezes ==
Name	Description	Image	Construction	Coordinates
Remédios Chapel (Capela dos Remédios)	Chapel made in honor of Nossa Senhora dos Remédios. It was built in 1554 and restored between 1868 and 1873. It was moved to its current location in 2009 due to urban arrangements.		1554	41.42325°N 8.29791°W
Urgezes Parish Church (old)	The old Parish Church of Urgezes, also known as Saint Stephen Church, replaced by its more modern counterpart in 1975, had its construction started on 21 June 1826 and was completed in 1842.		1826	41.42583°N 8.29631°W
Urgezes Parish Church (new)	The new Parish Church of Urgezes, also known as new Saint Stephen Church, was inaugurated on 9 March 1975 and it replaced its much smaller predecessor.		1975	41.42626°N 8.29657°W
