= Nicolinas =

Festival in Guimarães, Portugal

Nicolinas Festas Nicolinas
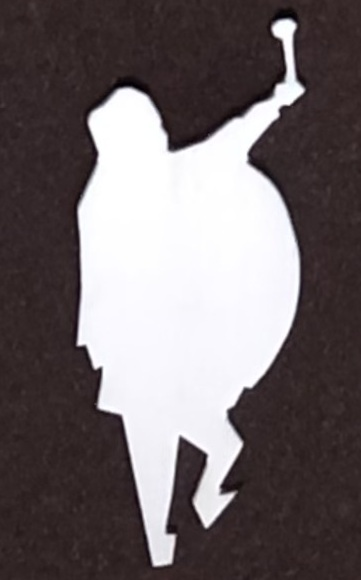
- The logo of the Nicolinas, located at the Torre dos Almadas, silhouettes a traditional Nicolino playing a drum.
- Genre: Festivities in honor of Saint Nicholas
- Begins: 29 November
- Ends: 7 December
- Frequency: Once per year
- Location: Guimarães
- Country: Portugal
- Years active: 1500s/1600s – present
- Name given to the participants: Nicolinos
- Major events: Election of the Nicolinas Festivities Committee (last Friday of September); Moinas (every Saturday in November until the 29th); Pinheiro e Ceias Nicolinas (29 November); Novenas (29 November to 7 December); Posses e Magusto (4 December); Pregão (5 December); Maçãzinhas (6 December); Danças de São Nicolau (6 December); Baile da Saudade (7 December); Roubalheiras (night varies)
- Organiser: Nicolinas Festivities Committee
- Website: Official website

The Nicolinas (Portuguese: Festas Nicolinas) are a series of festivities held in honor of Saint Nicholas in the Portuguese city of Guimarães. Observed annually from 29 November to 7 December, they celebrate local traditions and camaraderie (particularly among students). The first known literary reference to the Nicolinas dates to 1664, the year after the construction of the Chapel of St Nicholas in Guimarães; historical evidence, however, suggests that they predate this.

The Nicolinas consist of eight main events: the Pinheiro, the Novenas, the Danças de São Nicolau, the Posses e Magusto, the Pregão, the Maçãzinhas, the Baile da Saudade and the Roubalheiras. They are organized by the Nicolinas Festivities Committee, a group of 10 male high-school students. Active participants are known as "Nicolinos".

== History ==
The significance of the cult of Saint Nicholas in Guimarães during the 17th century is indicated by historical evidence such as the 1663 construction of a chapel dedicated to the saint, and statutory documents including 1691 statutes for the Brotherhood of Saint Nicholas. Although academic celebrations related to Nicholas in Guimarães can be traced back to at least 1645, they appear to predate that period; historians date the beginning of the Nicolinas to the 14th and 15th centuries, when the European cult of Saint Nicholas arrived in the city.

During the 19th century, the festivities were celebrated less frequently and at irregular intervals, until 1875, when they ceased. On 21 November 1895, a group of students and other citizens led by Jerónimo Sampaio and Bráulio Caldas organized a gathering at the Afonso Henriques Theatre to propose that the Nicolinas be reintroduced. Previously limited to one day (6 December), the celebrations were extended. Originally called the St. Nicholas Festivities, João de Meira renamed them during the early 20th century, and they became known as the "Nicolinas".

The new format was initially two days, with the programme for 6 December announced by a town crier who walked the streets of the city on 5 December. This was eventually extended to the present eight-day format, beginning on 29 November and ending on 7 December.

== Main festivities ==
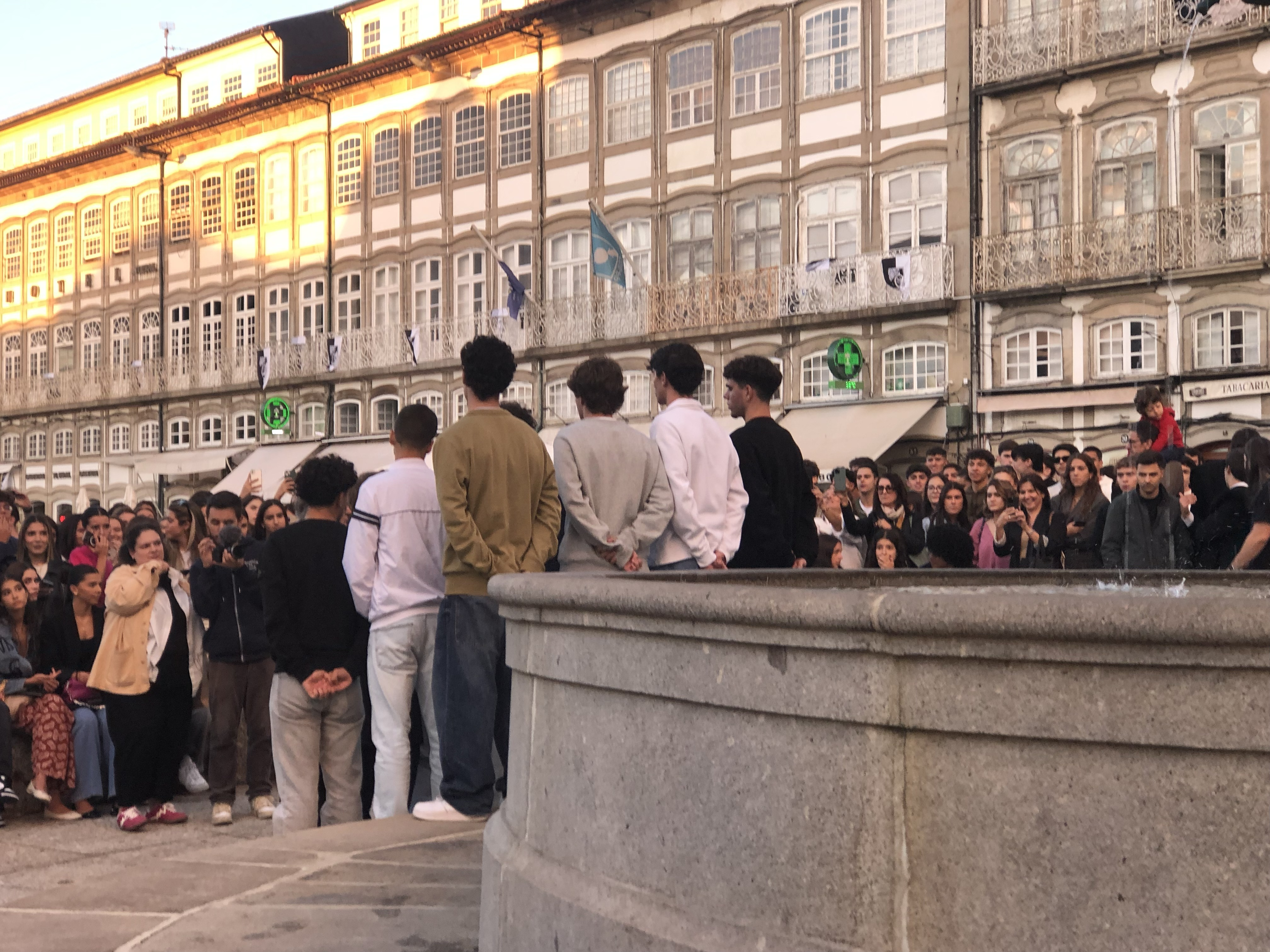
Election of the 2024 Nicolinas Festivities Committee at the Toural Fountain

The festivities take place every year from 29 November to 7 December and include several events, from the Pinheiro (the most popular) to the Baile da Saudade (the end of the festivities). The Nicolinas are organized by the Nicolinas Festivities Committee (Comissão das Festas Nicolinas), a group of 10 male students from Guimarães' high schools. The committee is elected annually by students on the last Friday of September at the Toural Fountain. Before 1982, only students from the Martins Sarmento High School could participate; since then, students from the other local high schools (Francisco de Holanda, Santos Simões, Caldas das Taipas and Veiga; the latter closed in 2005)) have also been eligible to participate and vote for committee members.

=== Pinheiro and Ceias Nicolinas ===
The festivities begin on 29 November with the planting of a pinheiro (pine tree) and the Ceias Nicolinas (Nicolinas Supper), held in honor of Saint Nicholas. These two events are the Nicolinas' most popular, especially among the youth of Guimarães. The Nicolinas Supper traditionally contains rojões with broccoli rabe, along with papas de sarrabulho (sarrabulho porridge) and Vinho Verde.

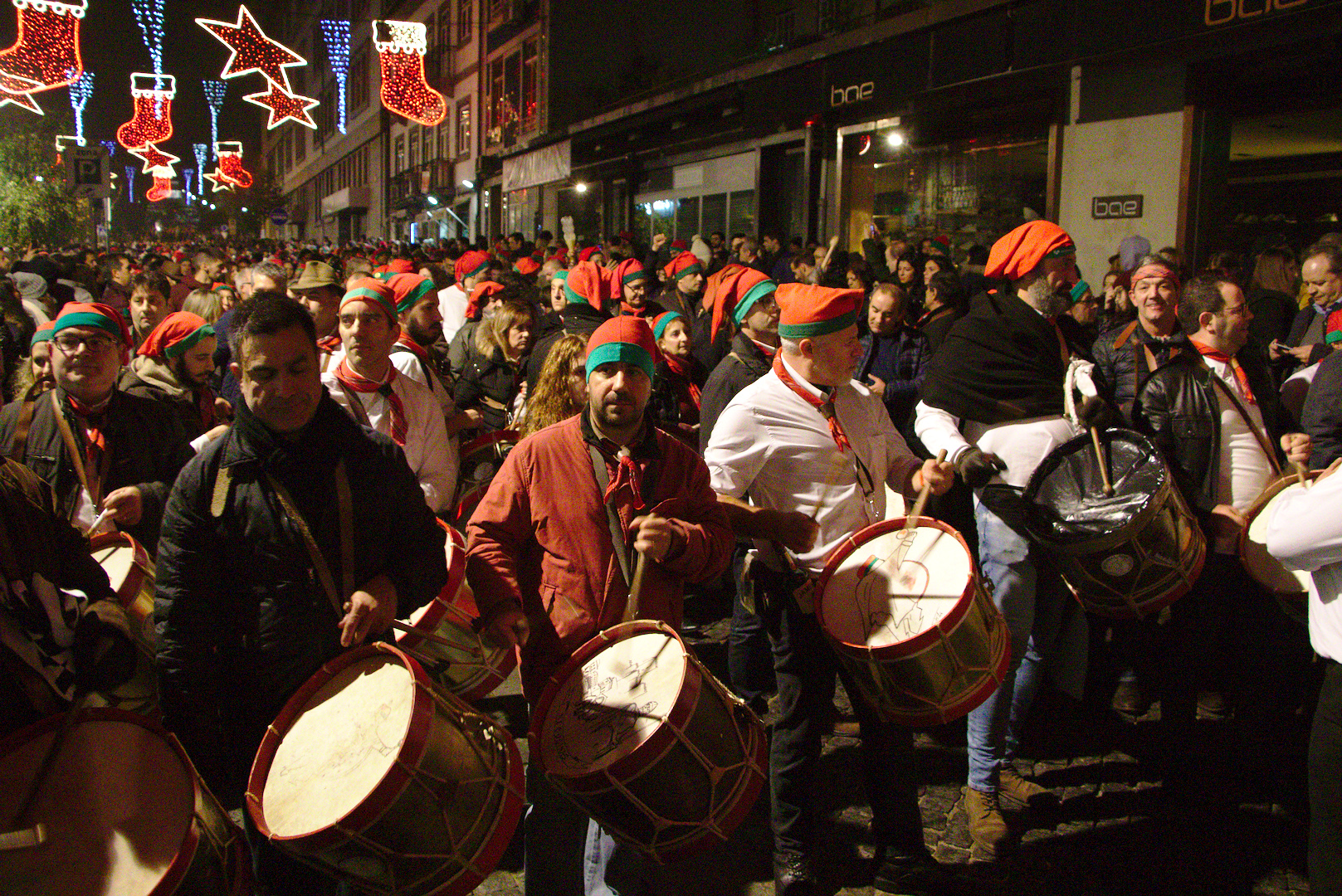
People of all ages celebrated the Pinheiro on 29 November 2018.

The name Pinheiro, describing the entire festivity, originated in the second half of the 19th century. Before that, references to the first Nicolinas festivity mentioned the "raising of the flagpole" or "the flag", rarely connecting the "flagpole" with the tradition of planting a pine tree.

After the Nicolinas Supper, participants gather at the Cano (at the Campo de São Mamede, named after the Battle of São Mamede) and await the start of the Pinheiro procession. The pine tree, traditionally the region's tallest, is provided by the Martins de Alvão family; it is prepared on the day of the procession by members of the committee. Decorated with candles, garlands, and banners with satirical and critical commentary on current issues, the pine is placed on a long cart and pulled through the city center by bulls.

Celebrants march alongside the pine playing the traditional Toques Nicolinos on caixas and bombos (drums made in special workshops across the city for the festival) or walk on the sidewalks. The parade ends next to Santos Passos Church, where the pine is raised and planted; this marks the beginning of the Nicolinas.

Until the 20th century, the pine tree selected for the event came from the forests surrounding the city. It was traditionally replanted at the Toural, but the practice changed during the late 1700s as urban expansion began to encroach on the area. The location for replanting the pine changed several times before settling next to Santos Passos Church.

In addition to students, people of all ages from Guimarães, nearby towns or from the rest of Portugal are spectators or participants. Teens and young adults often get drunk at the start of the procession, which older Nicolinos call "a distortion of the tradition, fueled by convenience".

At the height of the COVID-19 pandemic in 2020, the number of people attending the Pinheiro did not fall despite restrictions. Attendance was unexpectedly comparable to previous years, which was attributed to the cultural importance of the festivities to the residents of Guimarães. It was similar in 2021, when about 50,000 people attended the Pinheiro procession. Despite the negative opinion in the rest of Portugal about a large gathering of people during the peak of the pandemic, the Social Democratic Party defended the festivities; their vice-president, André Coelho Lima (who hailed from Guimarães), attended the Nicolinas. In 1905, João de Meira wrote that nothing would prevent the festivities from taking place if there was a single student in the city willing to fight for them.

=== Novenas ===
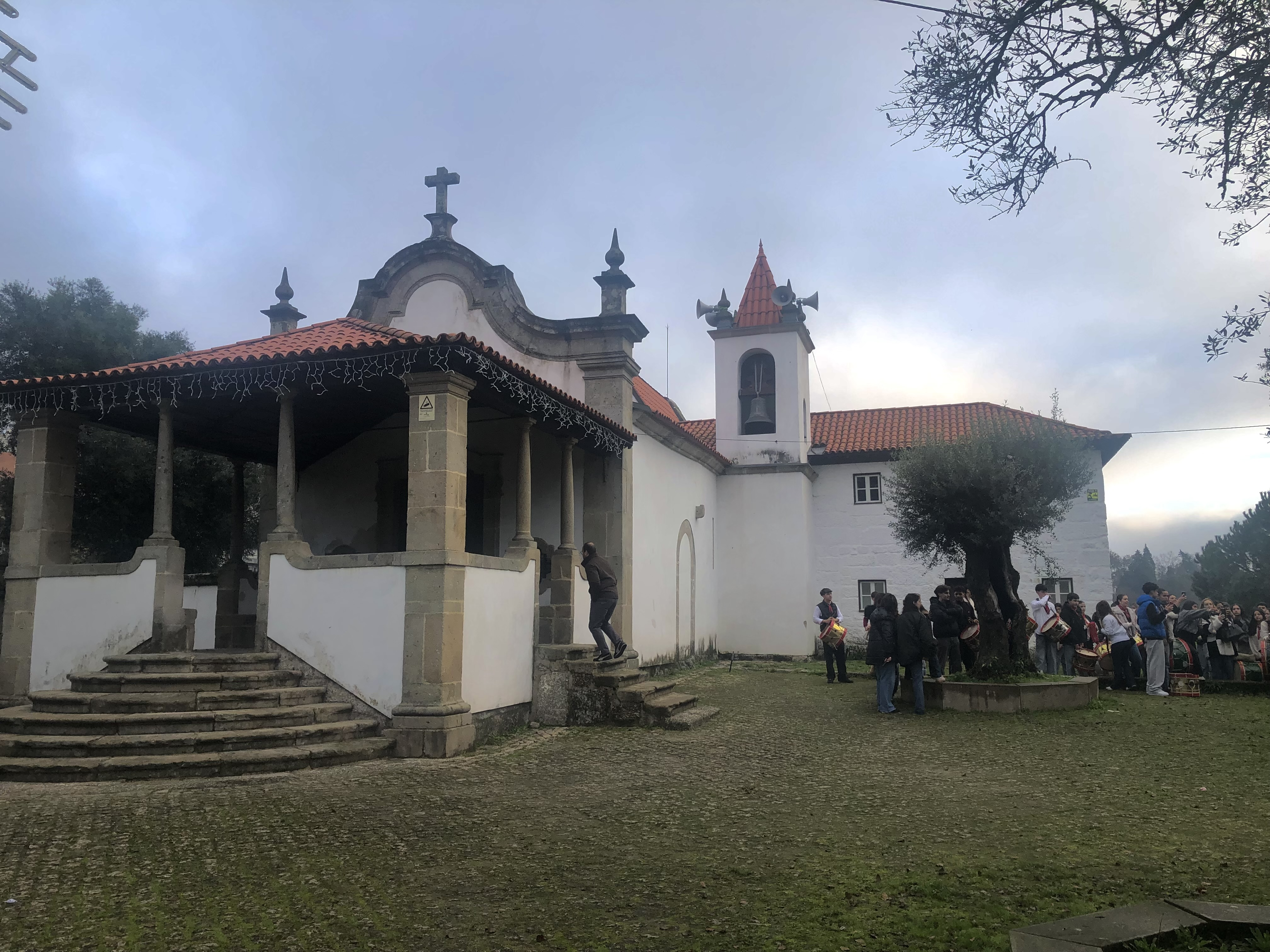
The Chapel of Nossa Senhora da Conceição during a Novena on 4 December 2024

The Novenas are a series of nine masses, one celebrated every morning between 29 November and 7 December in the 18th-century Chapel of Nossa Senhora da Conceição. The masses are also known as Novenas de Azurém, for the parish where they are held.

The Nicolinas Novenas are distinct from novenas celebrated elsewhere, celebrating the city's culture more than religion. They began during the 18th century due to the obligation to "hold sung masses every year, on the 7th and 8th of December, by the young chorists of the Collegiate Church of Nossa Senhora da Oliveira" dedicated to Our Lady of the Immaculate Conception.

Participants play the Toque Nicolino at the Novenas on caixas and bombos. One of the two parts of the melody is repeated nine times, one for each day of the festivities.

=== Posses and Magusto ===
The Posses (possessions), when Guimarães students gather food to distribute, were originally held on 6 December before being moved to 5 and then to 4 December. They begin at 9 pm on 4 December, and only students who are members of the Nicolinas Festivities Committee can participate in the gathering of food; non-members, however, may attend. The Posses procession begins on the Campo da Feira, winds through Guimarães' historic center, and follows a route which stops at houses where the owners have agreed to donate food.

When the Posses are completed, the Magusto ceremony begins around a bonfire where the students offer the collected food. Chestnuts and wine are traditionally shared, with socializing throughout the night. The Magusto was held at the Toural until 1862, and has been held on Santiago Square since the 1990s. The sharing of goods among students and residents symbolizes the bond between them.

=== Pregão ===
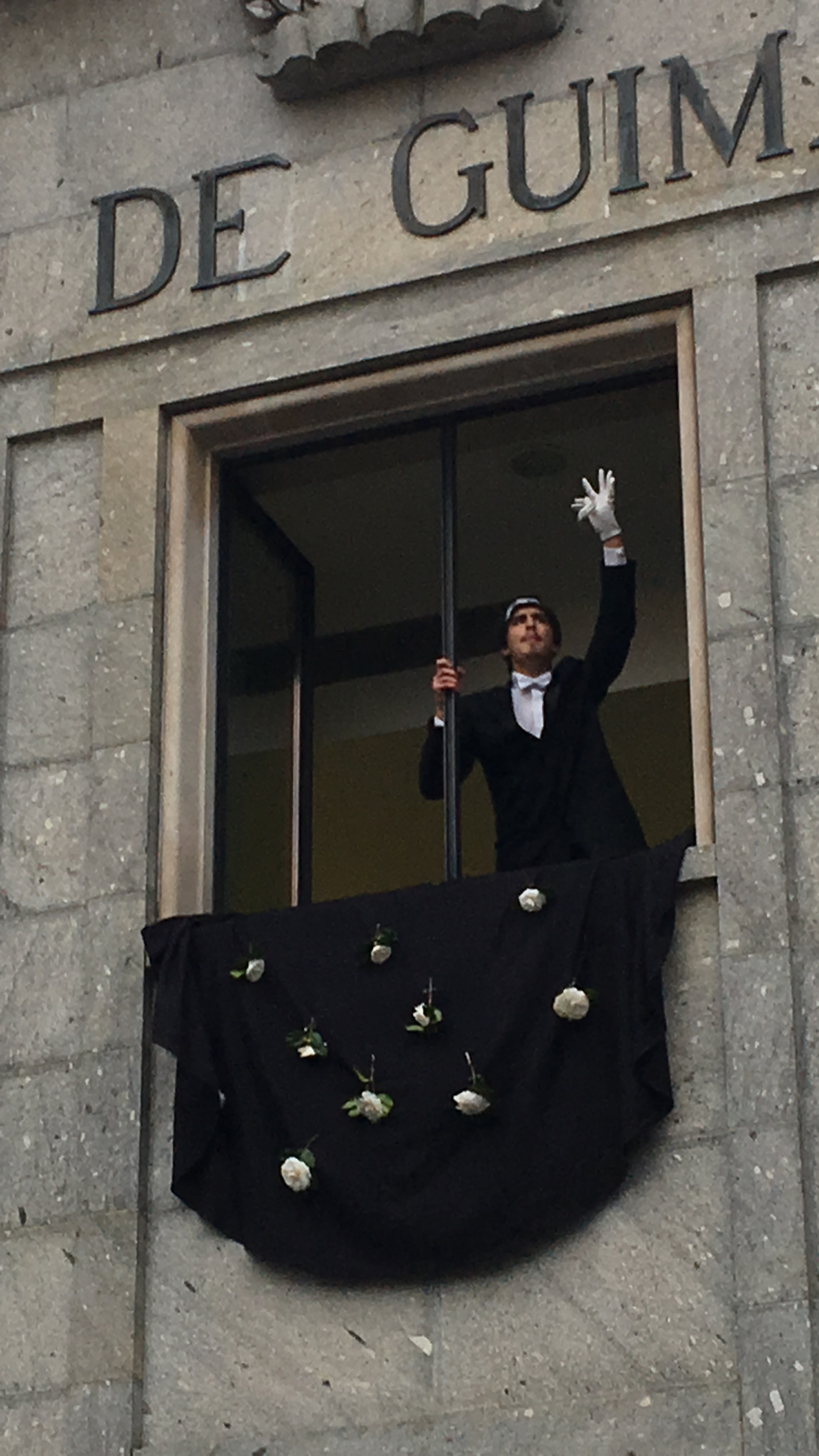
The Pregoeiro proclaiming the Pregão at Martins Sarmento High School, 5 December 2023

The Pregão de São Nicolau, popularly known as the Pregão and (previously) the Bando Escolástico, takes place on 5 December. During the Pregão, a committee member known as the Pregoeiro proclaims a text at five locations throughout the city center and leaves from the Campo da Feira for the Convento de Santa Clara. After the Pregão is said, he proceeds to Martins Sarmento High School, the Senhora Aninhas House, the Torre dos Almadas, and the Toural. The text, usually composed by a committee member, includes criticism of the year's events. It often uses satire, irony and sarcasm to criticize politicians, modern life or local affairs. The Pregoeiro recites the Pregão at five different locations across the city,

Documents from 1817 mark the Pregão's earliest known occurrence, but earlier proclamations were probably undocumented.

Guimarães historian and writer João de Meira wrote the Pregões of 1903, 1904, and 1905. His contributions established a standard for future Pregões.

Boys! Our divine music, is capable of making even Morpheus tremble!
The music of the Nicolinas festivities,
That shakes the earth and dismantles heaven!…
More force, if possible, more ferocious, because nothing is enough!
Let's make such a stubble, such a mockery, that would make this look like hell!...

— João de Meira, The 1904 Pregão, with the first reference to "Nicolinas".

=== Maçãzinhas ===
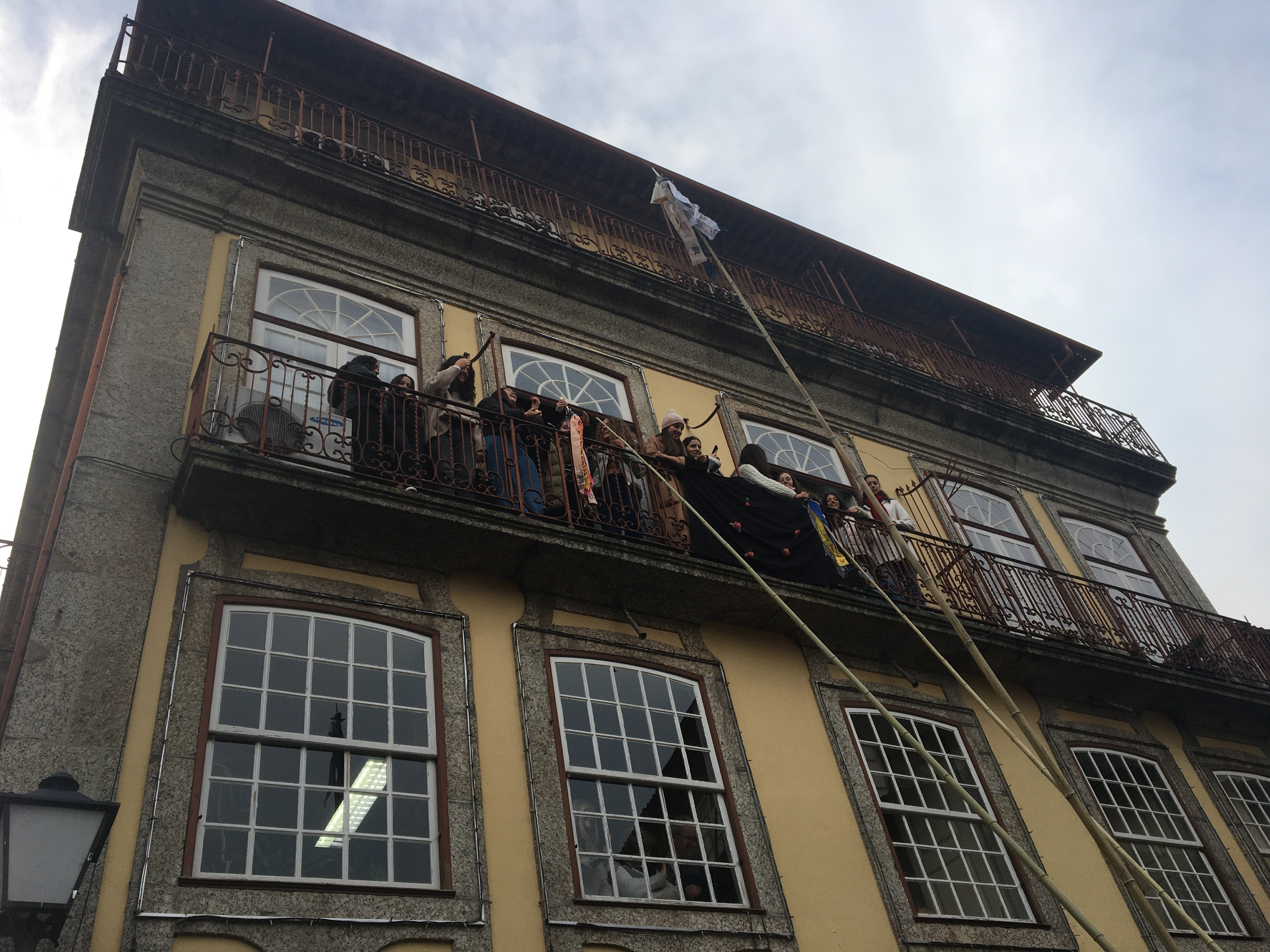
Girls stand on a balcony of a building in Santiago Square while boys below offer apples attached to the tips of spears.

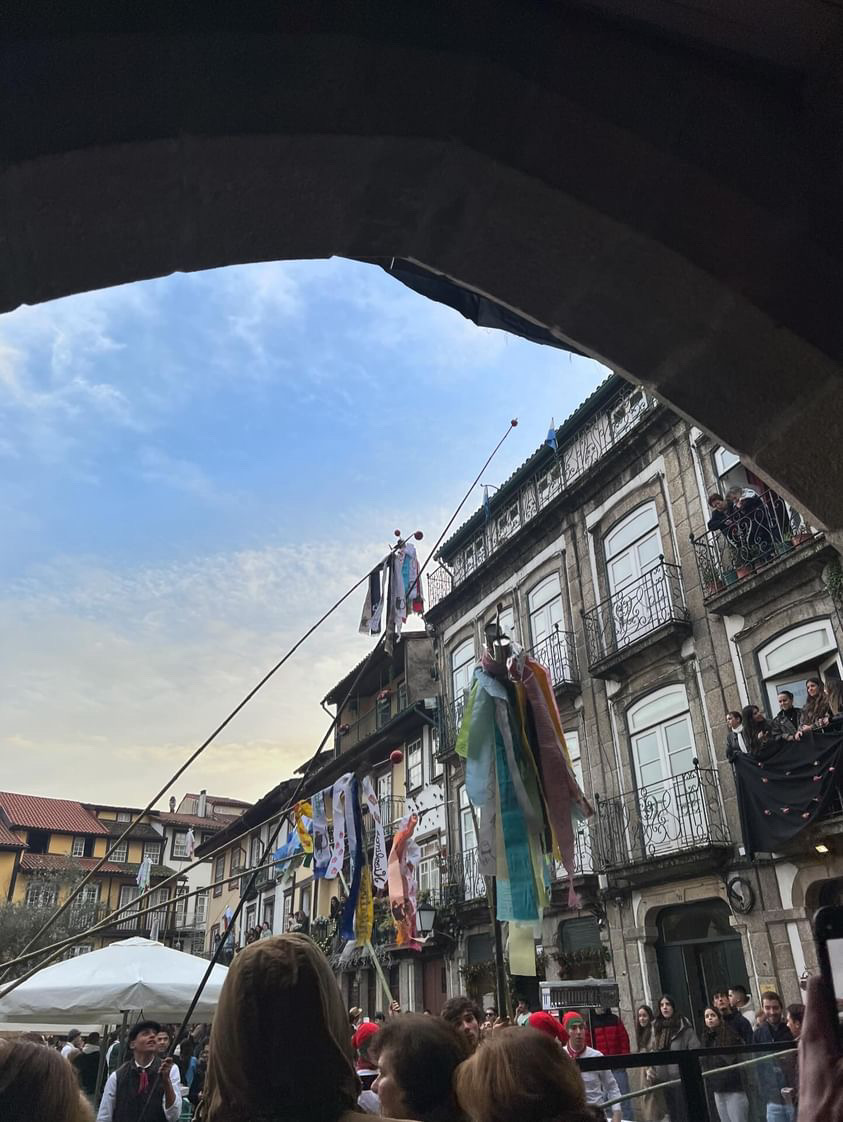
Many spear ribbons in Oliveira Square, 6 December 2023

The Maçãzinhas, previously known as the Cortejo das Maçãs, are among the Nicolinas' most iconic festivities. They are held on 6 December, Saint Nicholas Day, the day honoring the central figure of the festivities.

The Maçãzinhas trace their origin to the Romantic movement, inspired by Romanticism in France, England and Germany. The Maçãzinhas consist of a 3:00 pm procession through Guimarães' streets to Santiago Square, a place with the same name as the Spanish city (Santiago de Compostela) which played a key role in introducing the cult of St. Nicholas to Guimarães. The celebration commemorates the cult's roots in the city through its connection with the Romeiros. The procession formerly began at Urgezes Casa da Renda, continued through Cruz de Pedra, and ended at the Toural.

In the morning, preparations are made for the feast. Boys go to the Oficinas de San José to build and decorate the carts which will be used in the parade. They prepare disguises, put ribbons on their lances, put the lances on poles and find a squire to accompany them. The spears and poles are long enough for the boys to reach a balcony. The ribbons' colors have specific meanings. Adorned with sayings, symbols, and messages, the ribbons help the boys to choose the right girl to present the spear; if a boy has a particular girl in mind, he uses a larger, pink bow ribbon. Tying a bow with this ribbon symbolically binds them during the festivities. A boy participating in the Maçãzinhas for the first time traditionally uses a white ribbon to honor his mother.

The girls gather at Santiago Square and begin preparing for the event, sewing white camellias on capes and placing them on balconies around the square. Every girl who has a boy delivering an apple makes an appointment beforehand to save a spot on a balcony.

When the boys arrive, Santiago Square is filled with spectators; girls on the balconies wait for the event to begin. The boys (in disguise and accompanied by a helper) begin by placing an apple (Portuguese: maçã) on the tip of a spear attached to a long pole, and lift the pole to offer the apple to the girls. The girls return the gesture by replacing the apple with a small gift. When all the apples are taken, the spear is removed from the pole and offered to the girl chosen by the boy, or given to the boy's mother.

Oliveira Square and the Toural have a secondary part in the festivities. The Maçãzinhas preserve courtship customs and attract a number of teens each year.

=== Danças de São Nicolau ===
The Danças de São Nicolau, or Danças Nicolinas (Dances of Saint Nicholas), originated in the 17th century as a way for students to receive donations for student festivities. They were vital to gain enough funds to build the Chapel of Saint Nicholas. The dances were performed in the squares and streets of the city until they were discontinued in 1738. In 1954, a group of old Nicolinos revived the tradition of the dances. The dances returned to the Jordão Theatre in 1972, the second-most-recent festivity to be adopted by the Nicolinas one year before the Roubalheiras. The dances follow themes related to historical and mythical figures such as Afonso Henriques, Mumadona Dias, Saint Nicholas, Minerva and Gil Vicente.

=== Baile da Saudade ===
The Baile da Saudade or Baile Nicolino is the last festivity of the Nicolinas, which initially aimed to raise funds for the festivities. The event, a dinner and ball for couples formed at the Maçãzinhas, is open to all Guimarães students.

Baile da Saudade debuted on 30 November 1945 to commemorate the 50th anniversary of the resurgence of the Nicolinas. The ball was repeated in 1946 and 1947 at the Jordão Theatre. A festivity since 1973, it is the Nicolinas' most recent addition. Since 1962, the ball has been held on 7 December at Martins Sarmento High School. Prizes are awarded during the ball to former and current committee members. It may be considered an older example of the North American prom.

=== Roubalheiras ===
The Roubalheiras (thefts) involve the theft of items ranging from flower pots to cattle. It takes place on a random night between 29 November and 7 December (the length of the Nicolinas), and the night is hidden from everyone except the committee and local authorities. The date of the Roubalheiras changes annually.

A note is placed on the spot where the stolen items were, to alert their owners. It assures the item's owners that the disappearance was a part of the Nicolinas (not robbery) and directs them to the Toural, where the stolen possessions are displayed the following day and wait to be retrieved. The Roubalheiras is organized by the committee, which notifies the local authorities.

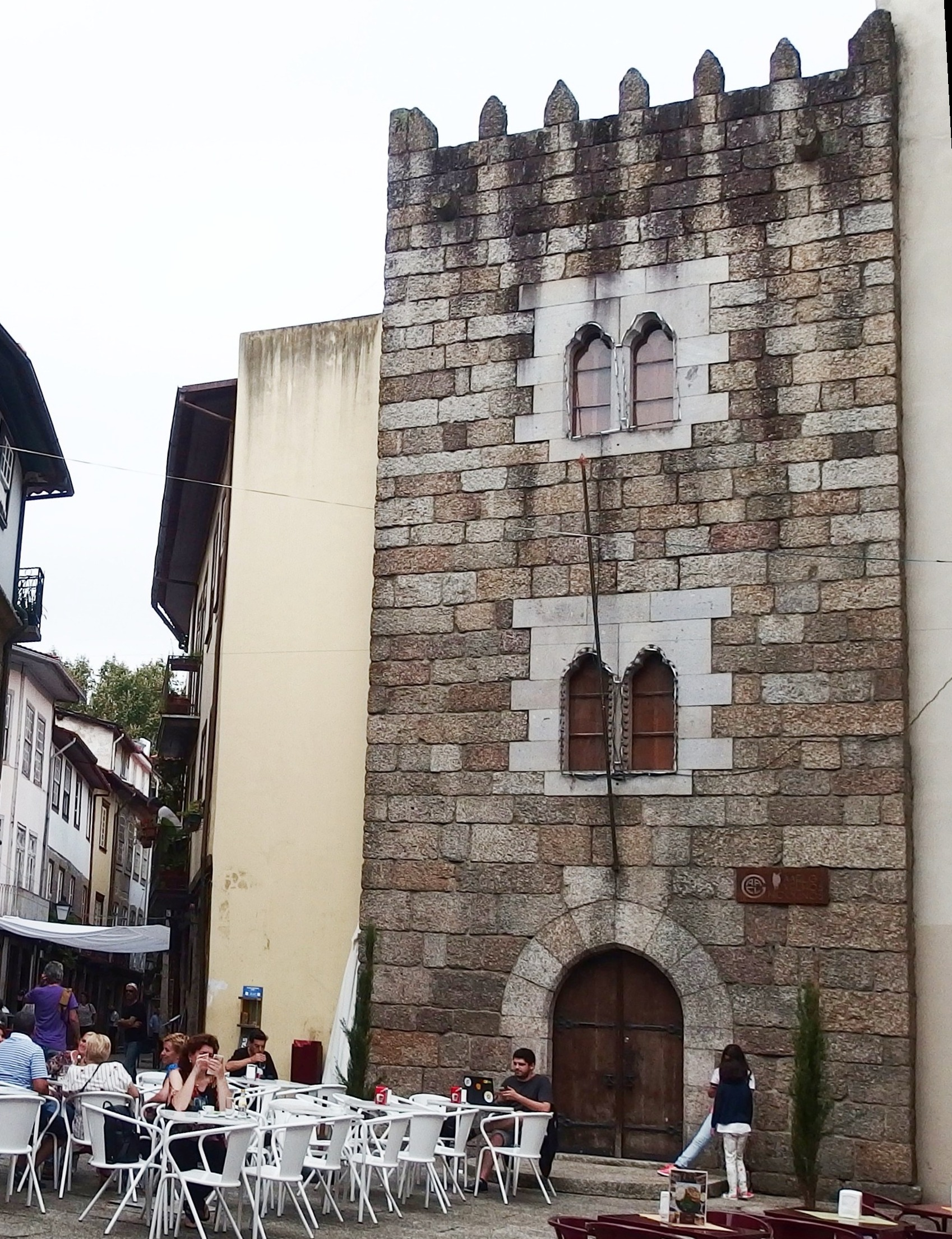
The Torre dos Almadas is the headquarters of the AAELG, the Guimarães High School alumni association.

The Roubalheiras previously coincided with the Posses on 4 December, after the Magusto. The first Roubalheiras took place in 1895 as part of an effort to revive the Nicolinas. It was initially called Rapto das Tabuletas (Kidnapping of the Signs), since signs outside shops and restaurants were popular targets of the thefts, but Roubalheiras is now their official name. They are a contemporary adaptation of a tradition in the villages of the Minho region, observed on 29 June Dia dos Atrancamentos, in which boys would relocate food, harvest tools and carts to confuse the adults.

The Roubalheiras were celebrated intermittently during the 20th century. The festival was abolished in 1905, and was reinstated four years later; it was again abolished in 1912, and revived in 1919. After another ban in the late 1920s, the tradition was revived in the 1950s and continued until 1973. It was again revived in 1994 and has been occurring ever since, deterring misuse of the festival as a pretext for illegal activity.

In 2021, despite the COVID-19 pandemic, it had the highest number of stolen items in Roubalheiras history; pilfered items included a bull and a trailer, backhoe loader and road-paving machine. The following year, property included a bull and a goat. The variety of stolen items expanded in 2023 and included a goalpost and football bench from the Afonso Henriques Stadium, scooters and bicycles, supermarket trolleys, and a number of gas heaters. The number of items in 2024 was smaller, but the theft of animals (including a goat) continued.

== Smaller festivities ==
=== Moinas ===
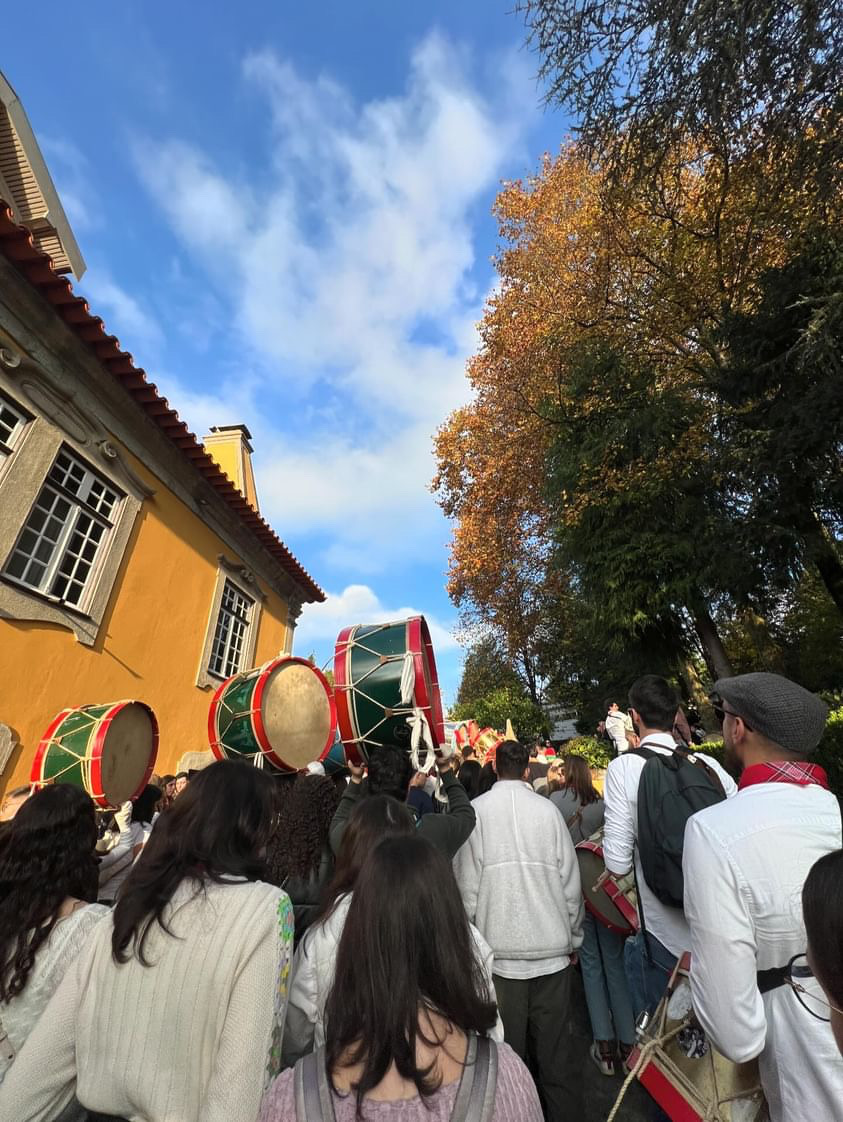
The third Moina of 2023, at the House of the Santoalhas

The Moinas, also called Moinas Nicolinas, are rehearsals held every Saturday in November before the 29th (the day of the Pinheiro). The rehearsals are an opportunity for people intending to participate in the festivities to tune their drums and practice the Toques Nicolinos, particularly the song made specifically for that Moina. Attendees at the Moinas usually wear white.

Rehearsals begin at Mumadona Square and end near the Toural Fountain. Refreshment stops are made, most notably at the House of the Santoalhas.

=== Dízimo de Urgezes ===
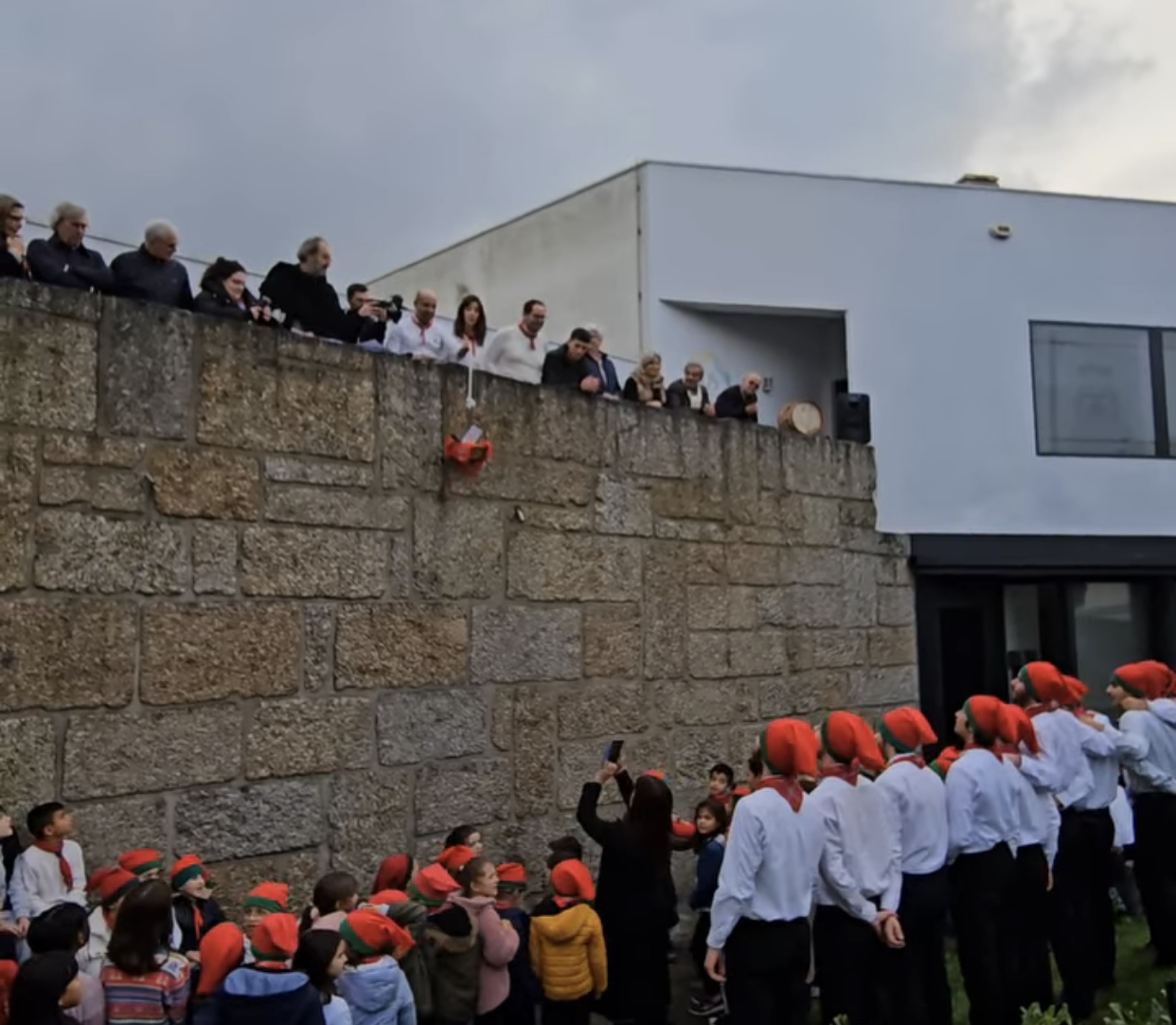
2024 Dízimo de Urgezes ceremony

The Dízimo de Urgezes (Tithe of Urgezes), is held on 4 December. Originally held on 6 December, according to an 1823 contract it involves a tradition of giving food to singers and students in the parish of Santo Estêvão de Urgezes: "two hundred apples, half a bag of roasted lupin beans, half a bag of roasted walnuts, two bushels of roasted chestnuts, two barrels of wine and two dozen large bales of paínça straw". Today, tithing involves money and food.

The festivity was first documented in 1717: "the dízimo of Urgezes will satisfy the Students of the Lord S. Nicolau, for their day, the portion to which he is obliged with all good satisfaction, as is the use and custom and has always been". Urgezes customs were a forerunner of the Posses festivity. An 1832 decree banned Dízimo de Urgezes, and it was abolished by a Porto Court of Appeal decision after an appeal filed by the Cabido da Colegiada. The event was restored by the [Urgezes junta de freguesia (parish board) on 30 October 1999.

The Dízimo de Urgezes ceremony is based on a symbolic offering, traditionally money and foodstuffs, by the Junta de Freguesia of Urgezes to the committee. After a speech, a committee member is ceremoniously lifted by the others to retrieve a basket with that year's tithe which is lowered from the balcony of the Junta de Freguesia building by its president.

== Cultural elements ==
=== Monument ===
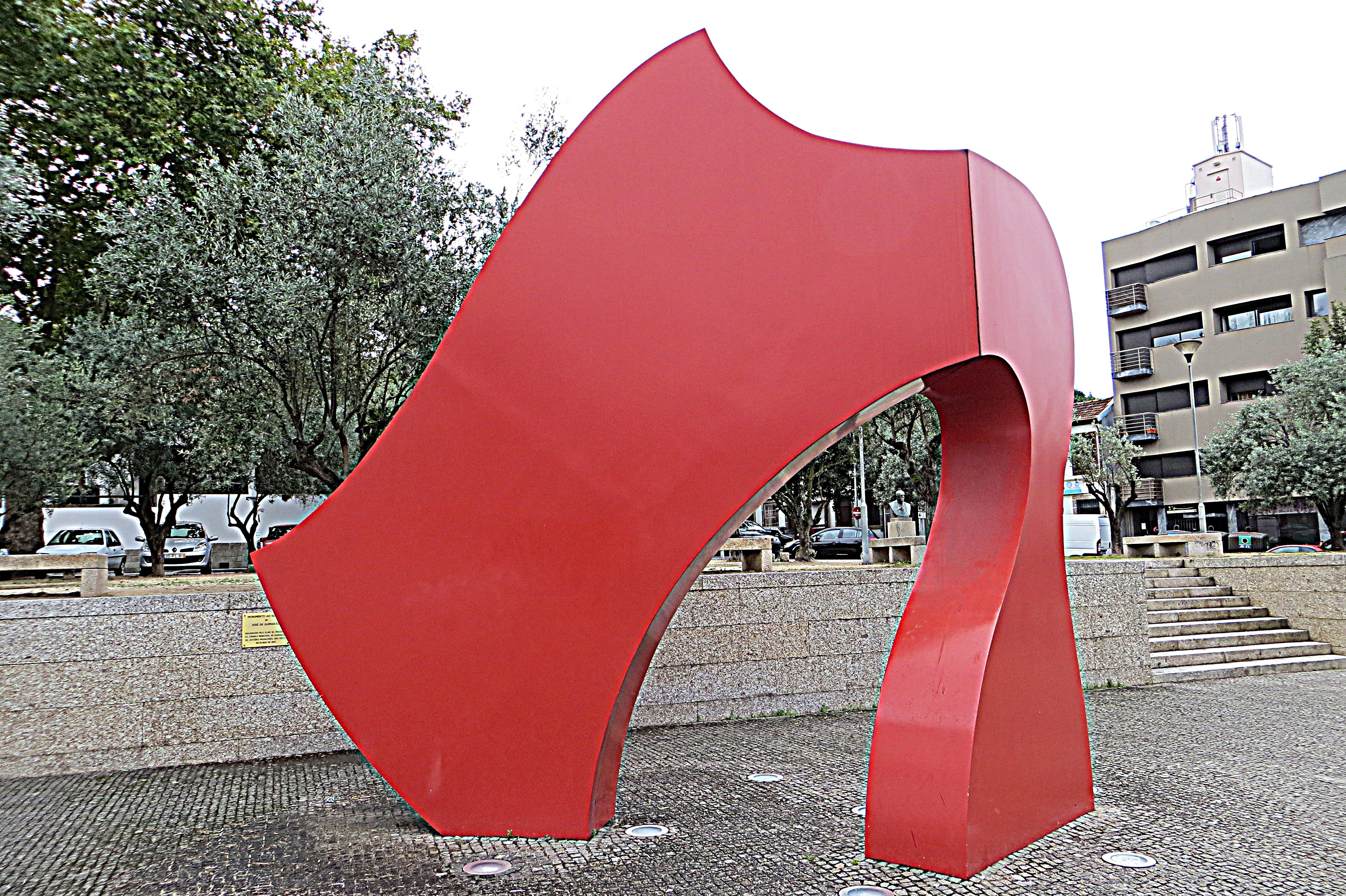
The Monumento ao Nicolino in 2014

The Monumento ao Nicolino (Nicolino Monument), honoring the Nicolinos, is next to Santos Passos Church and near the pine tree raised during the Pinheiro. Planned since 1993, it was approved by the City Council in 1999 but faced cancellation in 2002. The project was revived on 19 July 2007 with €40,000 in funding, and was scheduled for inauguration on 29 November to coincide with the start of the 2007 Nicolinas; after construction delays, the monument was dedicated on 25 January 2008.

Created by local plastic artist José de Guimarães, the monument symbolizes a fluttering cape, once an element of the academic attire worn by committee members.

=== Costumes ===
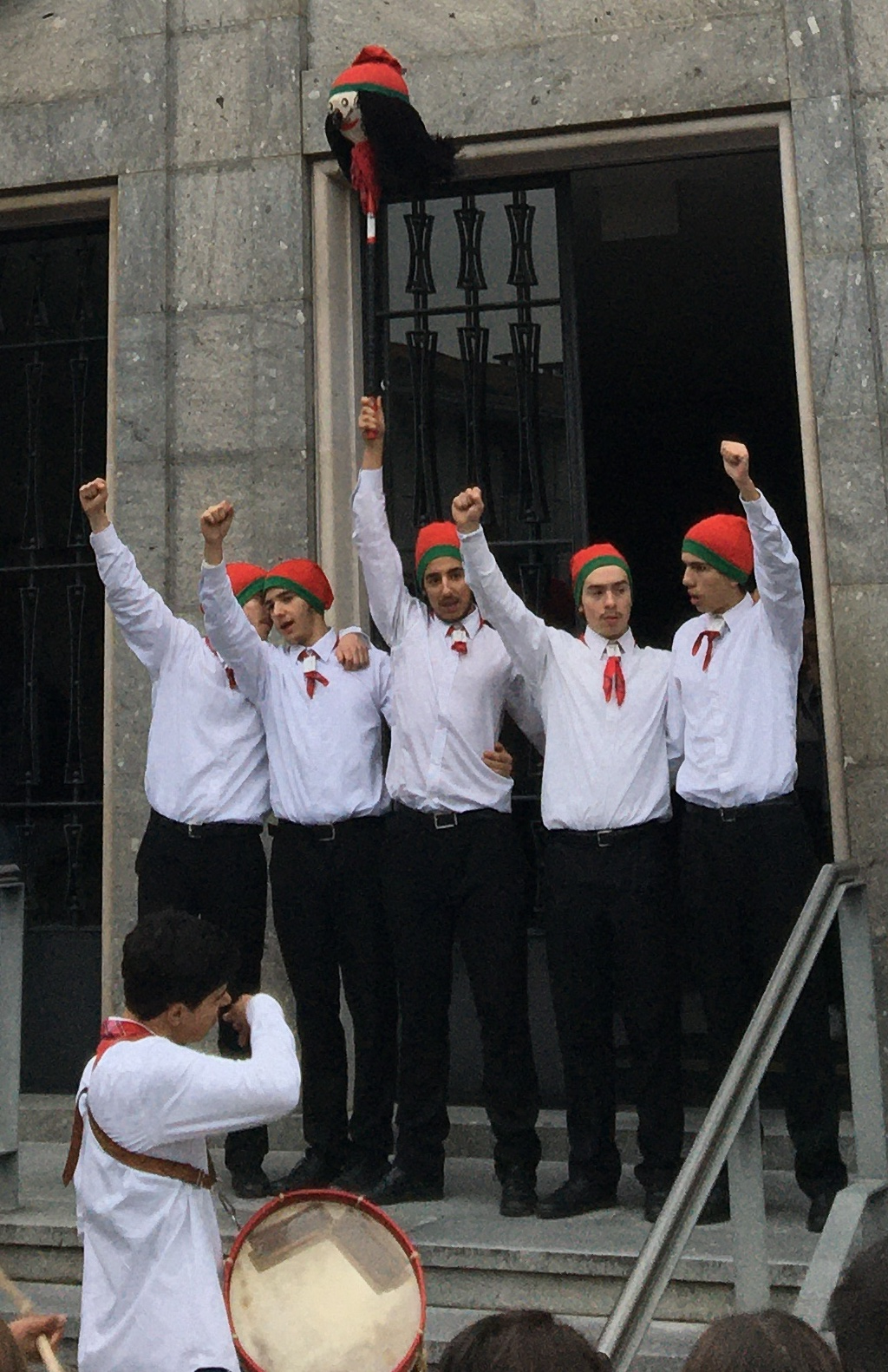
Committee students in Traje de Trabalho during the Pregão opening ceremony

Two costumes are worn for the Nicolinas: Traje Académico and Traje de Trabalho. The costumes, conceived in the 16th century, were introduced as the festival's traditional garments at the end of the 19th century.

The Traje Académico is worn by current or former committee members. It is a black overcoat with satin bands and pleats at the back, fastened with three buttons; each sleeve has three buttons near the cuff. Accompanying the overcoat is a plain black waistcoat without lapels. The trousers are straight-cut with pockets, worn with a simple black belt. Black shoes, with or without laces, are worn with plain black socks. A black cape has clasps on the collar and is usually worn folded over the left shoulder or draped over an arm or shoulder. For special occasions, a collared shirt is worn; a necktie is replaced by a black bow tie (or a white one during the Pregão for the Pregoeiro) and white gloves. Bracelets, earrings, piercings, or rings are discouraged.

The Traje de Trabalho, worn by Nicolinas attendees, is a variation of the Traje Académico which consists of black trousers, black shoes, a plain white shirt, a Tabaqueiro scarf, and a red-and-green hat similar to a Phrygian cap.

=== Logo ===
The logo of the Nicolinas is a Nicolino (festival participant) dressed in Traje de Trabalho, raising a drumstick in the air. It was designed by Gomes Alves and António Augusto Correia during the mid-1950s.

== Intangible cultural heritage candidacy ==
The Nicolinas were proposed as a UNESCO intangible cultural heritage (ICH) candidate during the 2000s and 2010s. The initial application followed an exhibit of materials related to the Nicolinas which included photographs of the 2000 Nicolinas by José Bastos and an oil painting by Paulo Varregoso Mesquita. Projections showcased photographs of aspects and motifs of the centuries-old festivities. The visual presentations also included brief texts about "Nicolinas as an Intangible Heritage of Humanity". The event was a "gateway to a remarkable cause", and the Tertúlia Nicolina association distributed bookmarks promoting recently-published books about the festival.

The idea to nominate the Nicolinas began with a 2005 paper by University of Minho professor Lino Moreira da Silva and a motion by politician André Coelho Lima. The festival has been waiting since December 2016 for the Direção-Geral do Património Cultural (DGPC) to proceed with its application for inscription on the National Inventory of Intangible Cultural Heritage, the first step in applying for ICH status.

In a December 2024 interview, Moreira da Silva (author of several books on the Nicolinas and a key figure in the festival's ICH candidacy) said that the Nicolinas' preservation is "in danger" – not of disappearing, but of degradation. According to Moreira da Silva, younger people are negatively influencing aspects of the celebrations which do not interest them. He said that many view the festivities simply as an occasion to drink and have fun, which is acceptable only if the Nicolinas' original meaning and cultural significance are maintained; excessive alcohol consumption, praxe, and the exclusion of women from the committee may deter future candidacies. In April 2025, the president of the Portuguese Cultural Heritage Institute expressed interest in submitting a new application for the Nicolinas to be recognized as an intangible cultural heritage.

== See also ==
- Saint Nicholas Day

== Bibliography ==
- Araújo, Francisco Miguel (2013). Pelos trilhos biográficos de João de Meira (1881–1913) [By the Biographical Trails of João de Meira (1881–1913)] (in Portuguese). Sociedade Martins Sarmento.
- Carvalho, A. L. de (1956). O S. Nicolau dos Estudantes [Saint Nicholas of the students] (in Portuguese) (2nd ed.). Guimarães: Oficinas de São José. Archived from the original on 2 December 2024 – via Issuu.
- César Gonçalves, Paulo; Cunha, Gabriela (2016). Manual (Para um pequeno) Nicolino [Manual (for a little) Nicolino] (in Portuguese) (2nd ed.). Guimarães: Minhografe. ISBN 978-989-20-7058-2.
- Dantas, António, ed. (8 December 1920). Os 'Velhos' [The 'Old ones'] (PDF) (in Portuguese). Guimarães: Tipografia Minerva Vimaranense. Archived (PDF) from the original on 26 December 2023.
- Monteiro, Hernâni (1925). 'Prof. João de Meira' in História do ensino médico no Porto:suplemento ['Prof. João de Meira' in History of Medical Education in Porto] (in Portuguese). Enciclopédia Portuguesa.
- Pimenta, José Ramiro (2007). O Lugar do Passado em Martins Sarmento. Geo-historiografia do programa de investigação arqueológica da *Cultura Castreja (1876–1899) [The Place of the Past in Martins Sarmento. Geo-historiography of the archaeological research program of Cultura Castreja (1876–1899)] (PDF). University of Minho (PhD Thesis). Archived (PDF) from the original on 27 March 2024.
- Pimenta, José Ramiro (2008). O Lugar do Passado em Martins Sarmento [The Place of the Past in Martins Sarmento] (in Portuguese). Porto: Figueirinhas.
- de Alcântara Santos, Manuela (1994). Sob o signo de S. Nicolau [Under the sign of St. Nicholas] (PDF) (in Portuguese). Guimarães: Alberto Sampaio Museum. Archived (PDF) from the original on 24 December 2023.
- Vasconcelos, Manuela. Alguns vultos do Movimento Espírita Português [Some figures from the Portuguese Spiritist Movement] (in Portuguese).
