= Campo da Feira =

Square in Guimarães, Portugal

República do Brasil Square
- Square
- Campo da Feira
- Largo da República do Brasil
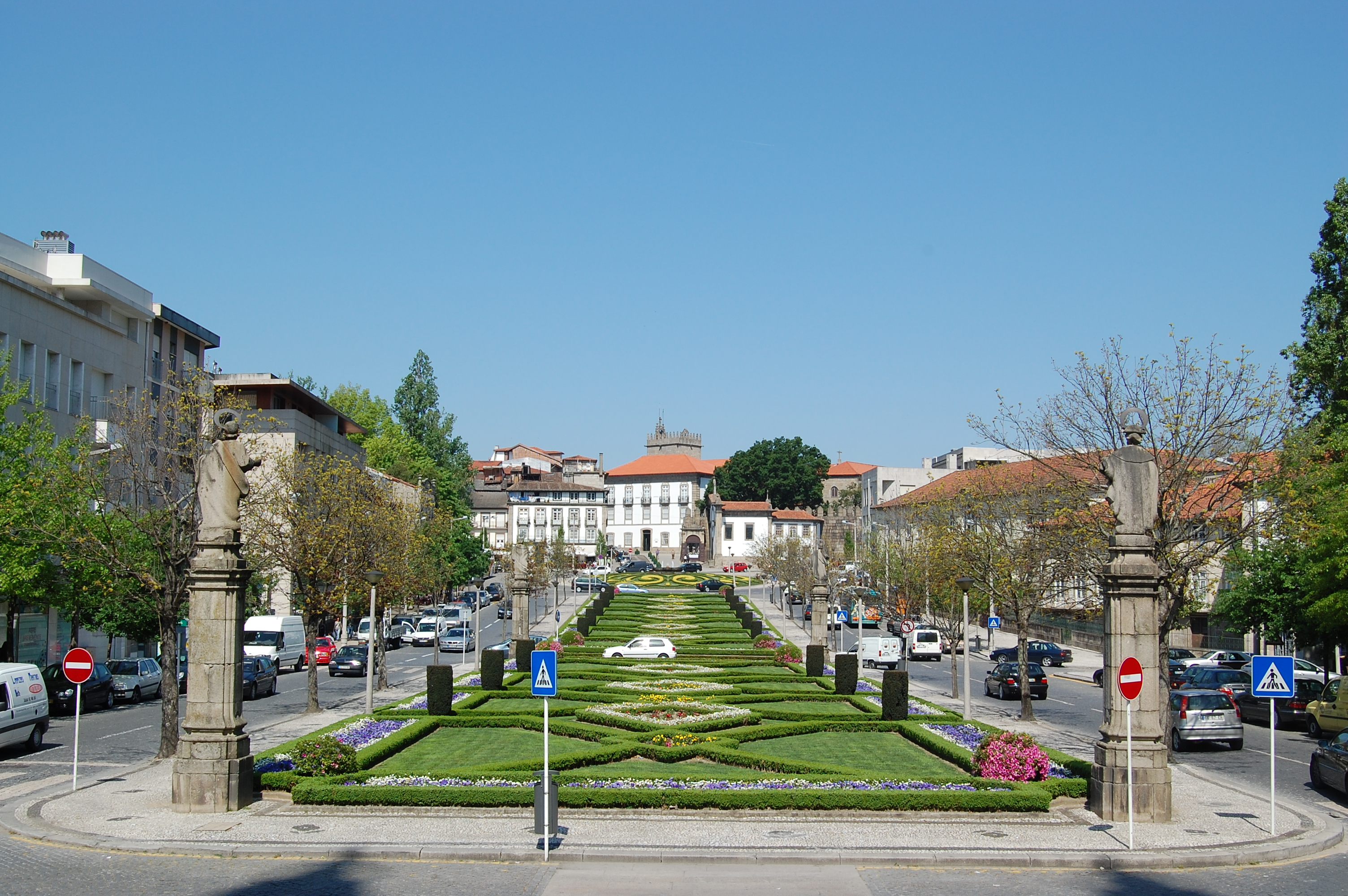
- The Campo da Feira in 2007, the Santos Passos Church is behind the photographer.
- Location: Guimarães, Portugal
- Interactive map of República do Brasil Square
- Coordinates: 41.44157°N 8.29068°W

The Largo da República do Brasil, popularly known as Campo da Feira, is the largest and one of the most important squares in Guimarães, Portugal. It has many of the city's landmarks such as the Santos Passos Church, the S. Francisco Comercial Center and the old Colégio de Nossa Senhora da Conceição.

== Description ==
In the south of the Campo da Feira is located the main attraction of the square, the Santos Passos Church, and opposite to it are the streets that lead to the Oliveira Square and the Medieval Walls and the Nossa Senhora da Guia Chapel and respective oratory. These are separated by three rectangular gardens filled with flowers and bushes that are changed periodically to match the current season.

These gardens are surrounded by Portuguese pavement and subsequently by roads. The garden farthest from the church, previously a roundabout, features a stone fountain at its front and the garden closest to the church features four granite statues, one at each corner, with the two statues farthest from the church having small fountains incorporated in their pedestal.

These statues were previously located next to the Santos Passos Church, on the columns of the staircase leading up to it. The statues represent the four saints who wrote the epistles, St. Paul, St. Peter, St. James and St. Jude. The gardens, officially called Jardins do Largo da República do Brasil, received the national award for good practices in local administration in 2008.

== Landmarks ==
=== Church ===
The Santos Passos Church is an 18th-century Portuguese baroque Catholic. It was constructed to replace a chapel that previously occupied the same site. It received the “protected landmark” status by the Portuguese government in 1993. It is also located within the Historic Centre of Guimarães area, a UNESCO World Heritage Site, since 2001. The church plays a significant role in many of the festivities and religious celebrations of Guimarães, such as the Pinheiro.

=== Theatre ===
The square was home of the Vila Pouca Theatre, located on the right side of the Campo da Feira. After the Count of Vila Pouca Theatre was purposely burned down on the night of 18 January 1841, the Afonso Henriques Theatre was built on the northwest part of the square in 1853, to replace it. It was inaugurated in 1855 but due to its poor state and decaying structure it was demolished in the 1940s, being replaced by the Jordão Theatre, built in 1937 and inaugurated in 1938 at the Afonso Henriques Avenue.
