= Santiago Square =

Medieval town square in Guimarães, Portugal

- Praça de Santiago
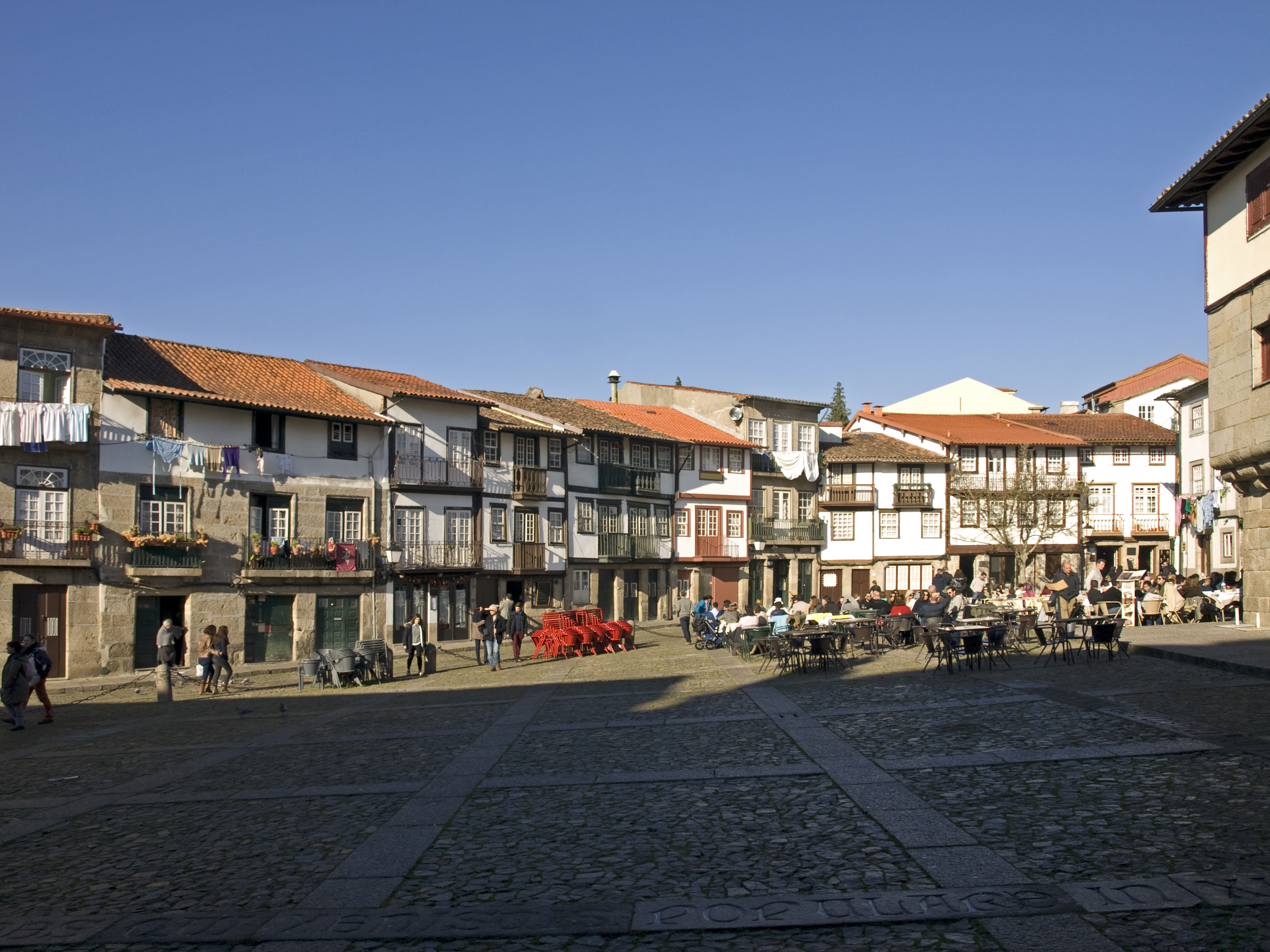
- Part of the Santiago Square in 2016
- Interactive map of Santiago Square
- Location: Guimarães, Portugal
- Coordinates: 41.44337°N 8.29319°W

The Santiago Square, or São Tiago Square, (Portuguese:Praça de Santiago), is a medieval town square located in the city of Guimarães. It is fully included in the UNESCO World Heritage Site of the Historic Centre of Guimarães.

== History ==
According to tradition, an image of the Virgin Mary was brought to Guimarães by the apostle St. James (São Tiago in Portuguese) and placed in a pagan temple in a square that came to be called St. Tiago Square.

The Santiago Square is mentioned over various centuries in multiple documents, and it still retains many of its medieval features.

It was in its vicinity that the Franks who came to Portugal in the company of Count Henry settled. There existed a small 17th century porched chapel dedicated to St. James, which was demolished at the end of the 19th century, and the place where it once stood is marked using Portuguese pavement.

The now-romanticized and photogenic medieval houses were once considered sloppy and unsanitary. The square they occupied was deemed an "unworthy" place, as evidenced by the scarcity of old photographs of it in postcards compared to other areas of the city.

In the 19th century, there were projects to improve this square and the alleys attached to it, which was described as a place where every corner is a source of infection. Such projects were repeated throughout the 20th century, and in May 1904, the City Council approved a project to extend the Santiago Square, expropriating three buildings, the back of which formed an “infected alleyway, impossible to make habitable”.

In 1911, the republican newspaper Alvorada asked its readers to answer the following question: What is the most urgent and far-reaching work that the City Council should undertake? In one of the answers, a reader proposed the complete elimination of the S. Tiago neighborhood, the “neighborhood of prostitutes”. He describes it as being an “antisocial and at the same time antigenic den that demoralizes our society, defiles our race and tarnishes the atmosphere that surrounds us, must be removed from the city center”.

The Santiago Square is the main location where the Maçãzinhas, one of the festivities of the Nicolinas, takes place.
