= Santos Passos Church =

Church in Guimarães, Portugal

- Igreja de Nossa Senhora da Consolação e dos Santos Passos
- Igreja de São Guálter (Saint Guálter Church)
- Igreja dos Santos Passos
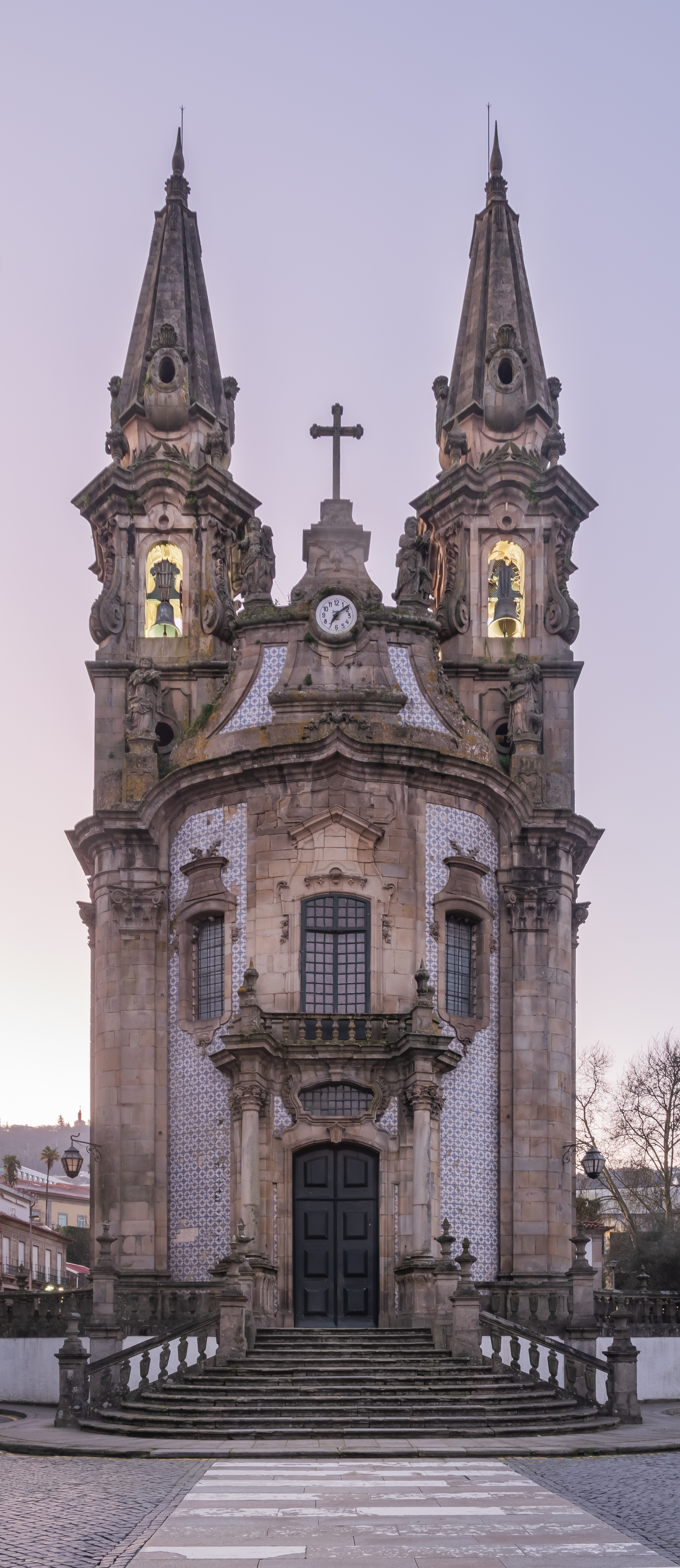
- The Santos Passos Church
- Santos Passos Church
- 41°26′27″N 8°17′23″W
- Location: Campo da Feira, Guimarães
- Country: Portugal
- Denomination: Catholic

History
- Status: Protected (Public Interest Building), inserted in the HCG.

Architecture
- Architects: André Soares (Church); Pedro Ferreira (Bell towers)
- Style: Portuguese baroque with Rococo influences
- Years built: 1576 (Hermitage church); 1594 (Original chapel); 1767–1785 (Current church); 1789–1798 (Apse); 1861 (Lateral expansions); 1862–1875 (Bell towers)

Administration
- Archdiocese: Roman Catholic Archdiocese of Braga

UNESCO World Heritage Site
- Part of: Historic Centre of Guimarães
- Criteria: Cultural: ii, iii, iv
- Reference: 1031
- Inscription: 2001 (25th Session)

The Santos Passos Church (Portuguese: Igreja dos Santos Passos), officially called Igreja de Nossa Senhora da Consolação e dos Santos Passos and sometimes referred to as Igreja de São Gualter, is an 18th-century Portuguese baroque Catholic church located at the Campo da Feira in Guimarães, Portugal.

Constructed to replace the dilapidated chapel which had previously occupied the same site, the Santos Passos Church and its five oratories, which depict the Passion of Jesus, were designated a protected landmark by the Portuguese government in 1993. It also falls within the Historic Centre of Guimarães, a UNESCO World Heritage Site since 2001. The church plays a significant role in many of the festivities and religious celebrations of Guimarães.

== Description ==
=== Structure ===
The church has a longitudinal floor plan comprising a single nave with concave angles, a rectangular chancel and is set in a northwest–southeast direction. The church features distinct roof styles for its various sections. The nave and chancel are topped with gable roofs, which provide a traditional peaked appearance, while the side chapel and sacristy are covered with hipped roofs.

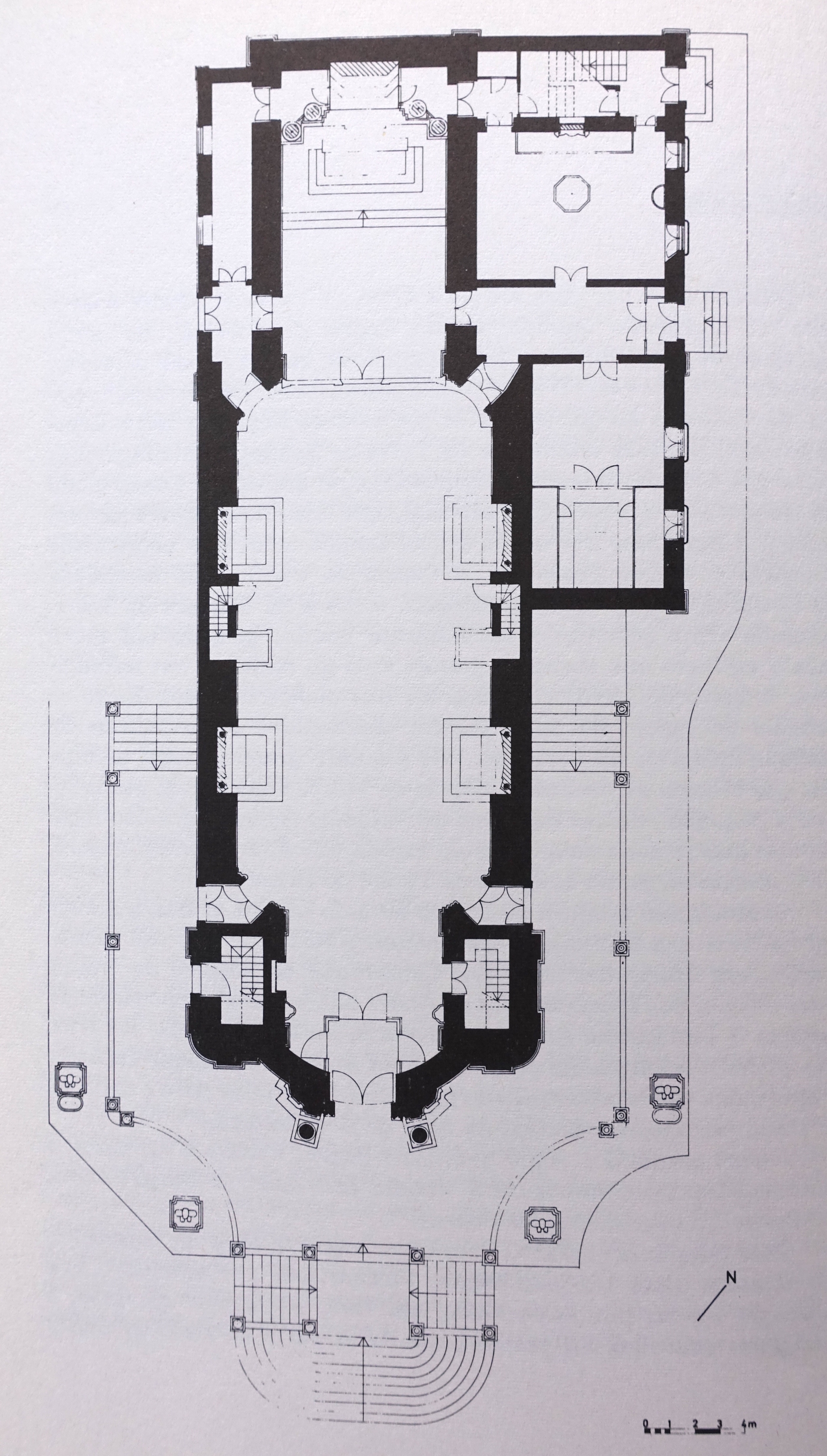
The floor plan of the Santos Passos Church

Adding to the body of the church, a side chapel and sacristy are located to the southwest. Facing northeast, the undulating main façade is convex and covered in blue and white azulejos. According to the author Jorge Henrique Pais da Silva, the curves do not impact the internal spatiality of the church, since the division between the vestibule and the nave is very sharp. Its façade also contains a portal, a bay window and two narrow windows crowned by a tympanum with a clock, topped by a cross and flanked by two statues on each side.

On a slightly recessed level, there are two slender bell towers topped by pyramidal corbels. The church stands on a terrace, served by a staircase with several flights and a balustrade with pinnacles, flanked by pedestals with statues.

Inside, the church is filled with fourteen mother-of-pearl framed paintings depicting the Way of the Cross in polychrome 18th century French engravings. There is also a processional flag painted by the Swiss artist Auguste Roquemont. The altarpiece and the dais were made by the master carver José António da Cunha. The two sculptures flanking the main staircase represent James the Great and Saint Bartholomew.

The church is located 571 metres (1,873 ft) above sea level.

The building was described by architectural specialist Joaquim Jaime Ferreira-Alves as being a church with "a nave with concave curves at the corners and a slight convex curve on the façade" with "serious, simple and plain ornaments".

=== Gardens ===
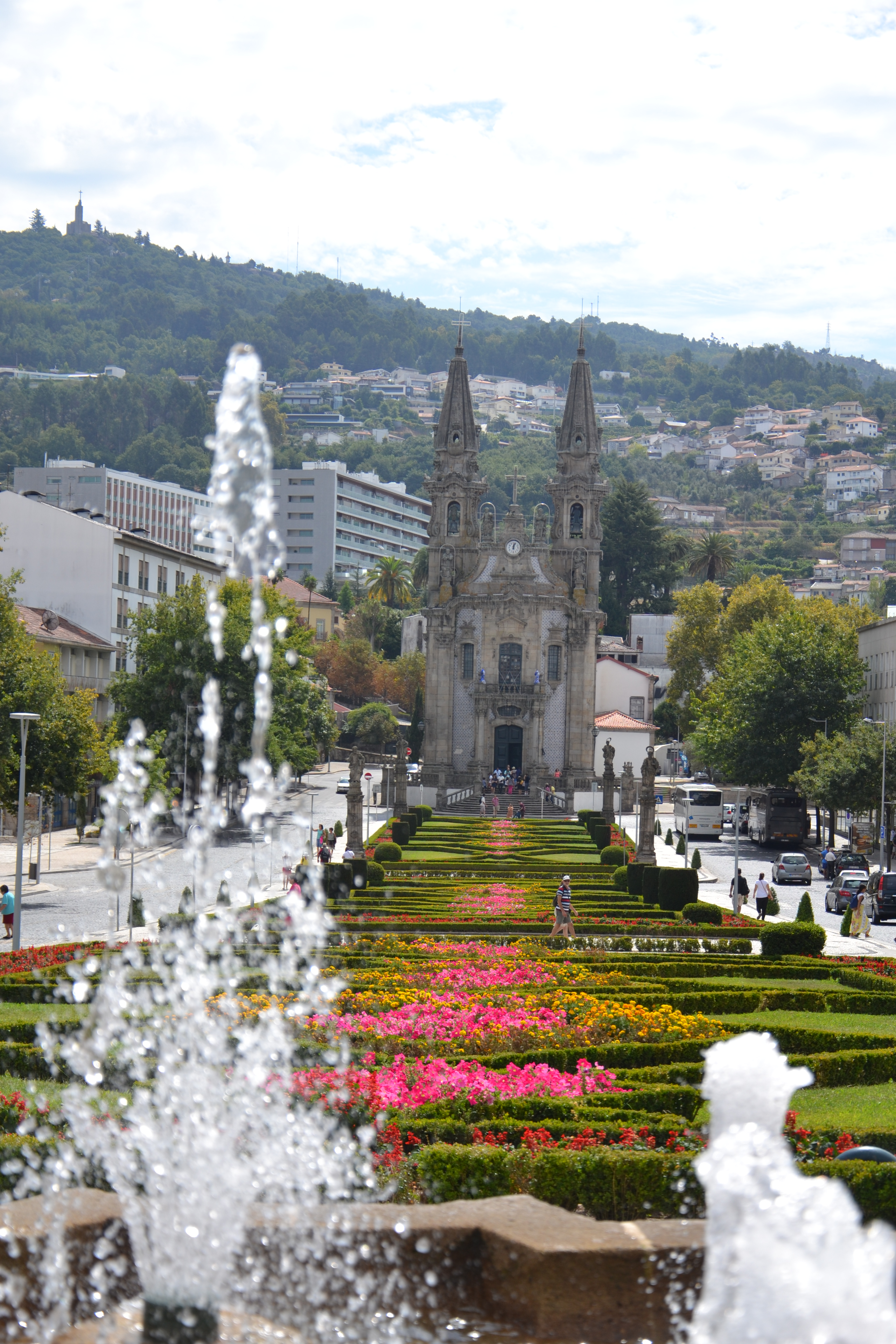
The gardens and fountain in front of the Santos Passos Church

In front of the church are three rectangular gardens filled with flowers and bushes that are changed periodically to match the current season. These gardens are surrounded by Portuguese pavement and subsequently by roads. Forty days before Easter, purple banners are put in the border of the gardens to mark Lent. Once Easter is over, they are removed.

The garden farthest from the church, formerly a roundabout, features a stone fountain at its front. The garden closest to the church included four granite statues, one at each corner, with the two statues positioned farthest from the church having small fountains built into their pedestals.

These statues were previously located next to the church, next to the staircase leading up to it. They represented the four saints who wrote the epistles, St. Paul, St. Peter, St. James and St. Jude. On 18 October 2025 a new statue depicting St. Thomas was inaugurated, with five more planned to be added.

The gardens, officially called Jardins do Largo da República do Brasil, received the national award for good practices in local administration in 2008.

=== Oratories ===
One of the five Oratories, located in the northwest of the Campo da Feira

The Oratories, also known as Passos, are small temples that form a Way of the Cross, depicting the steps of the Passion of Jesus. Within these structures, life-size figures sculpted from polychrome wood vividly portray scenes from the Passion. All of the Oratories are constructed using granite and are situated throughout the Historic Centre of Guimarães as part of the Santos Passos Church complex. Each oratory is equipped with large wooden exterior shutters allowing them to be securely closed when necessary, as well as a small sign with info about the respective oratory. Originally, there was a total of seven different oratories, however, due to the growth of the city, some had to be moved or outright destroyed. Five Oratories remain standing: two at the Campo da Feira, one at the Misericórdia Square, one on Santa Maria Street and one at the Carmo Square.

=== Materials ===
The church's exterior walls are constructed from granite masonry and coated with fine sand on both the exterior and interior surfaces. Similarly, the ceilings in the nave and chancel are also plastered. The main façade is adorned with azulejos, while the bell towers are constructed using exposed granite masonry. Tiled paneling decorates the nave, and both the floor of the nave and the chancel are covered in ceramic mosaic with granite accents. The sacristy is clad in oilcloth and its ceiling is finished in stucco. The celling also has a wooden structure covered in clay tiles. The main staircase and balustrade are made of granite, and so are the four statues on top of the tympanum.

== History ==
=== Predecessors ===
The site on which the Santos Passos Church now stands was originally occupied by a hermitage church made to honor Our Lady of Consolation, built in March 1576. It was later replaced by a small chapel preceded by a large porch with stone seats built in 1594 by order of Duarte Sodré. By the early 18th century, that chapel had decayed into ruins and was a safety hazard. The Irmandade dos Santos Passos (transl. Brotherhood of Santos Passos), a fraternal organization founded on 13 November 1594 and the owner of the chapel, ordered the construction of a "bigger and richer building" on top of the decayed structure.

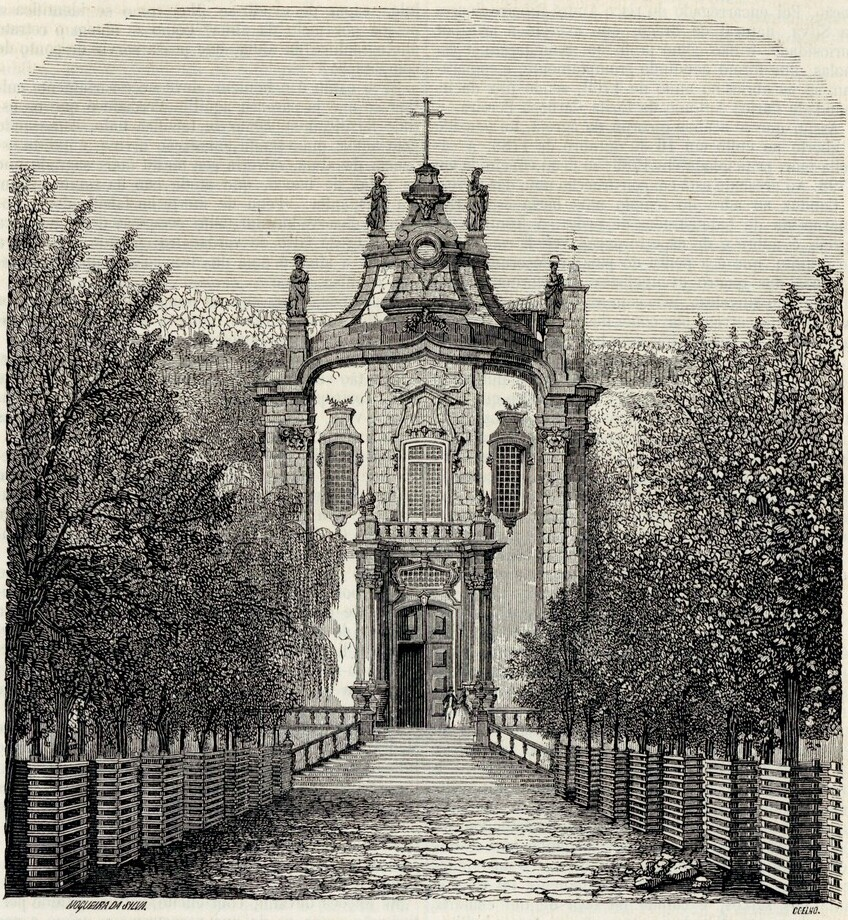
Engraving from an 1864 magazine showing the Santos Passos Church before the construction of its bell towers, with the original bell-gable still visible on the right.

In the first quarter of the 1700s, that small chapel was demolished and another, larger chapel was built in its place; however, the work remained half-finished since the construction took longer and was more difficult than originally thought. Due to the construction problems, the frontispiece's construction never began; nevertheless, the image of Our Lady of Consolation was placed on the high altar and customary worship was reinstated. In 1727, seven Oratories were constructed across the city by the Irmandade for public use.

Years later, the Irmandade recognised the many inconveniences and lack of respect that arose from the incomplete chapel; in 1767, a wall was constructed to close it off probably to prevent vandalism and the structure's collapse. The chapel did not remain abandoned for long, as the Irmandade decided that they would either reconstruct the building or demolish it and begin the construction of a completely new structure.

=== Construction ===
==== Body and apse ====
The Irmandade chose to start the construction of a new, larger church instead of rebuilding and expanding the previous incomplete chapel and the Galician Pedro Lourenço later bought the construction rights at an auction. In 1769, the floor plan of the church was made by the renowned architect André Soares. André Soares drew inspiration from one of his previous projects, the Igreja da Lapa, constructed some years earlier in Arcos de Valdevez, when designing the façade of the church. The Santos Passos Church was his last work, as he died that same year. André Soares' death may have prevented him from designing the interior as well, although the plan followed seems to have respected the architect's project. At the Count of Vila Pouca Theatre, also in the Campo da Feira, shows and plays were performed regularly so that money could be raised to aid the construction efforts of the church.

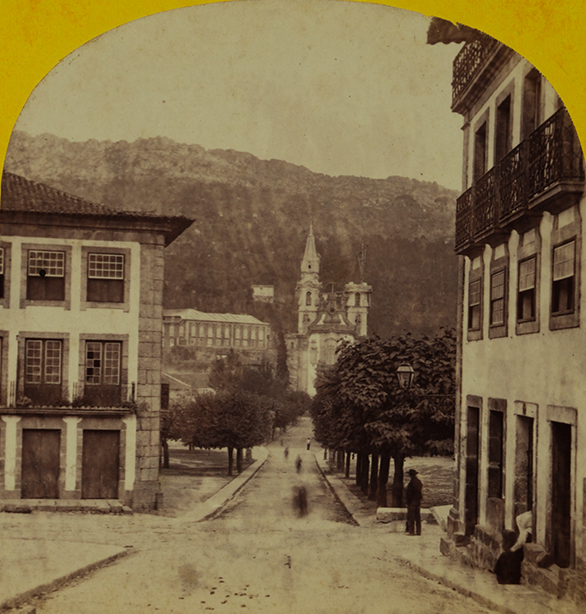
Photograph from c. 1869 showing the Santos Passos Church in the background. One of the bell towers is still under construction.

On 18 October 1785, the body of the church was finished; it was blessed the same year. Construction of the apse did not begin until 1789. The section of the Medieval Walls of Guimarães that surrounded the Toural was demolished in 1789, enabling the reuse of its stones in the construction of the church's apse. The apse's construction was concluded nine years later, in 1798.

The master stonemasons Vicente José Carvalho and Diogo Soares contributed in the church's construction, with Soares being in charge of the construction's budget and Carvalho gaining control of the whole project on 10 April 1773. It is very likely that the Santos Passos Church was sacked and looted during the Napoleonic Invasion of northern Portugal in 1809, as it was located outside the city walls.

==== Expansions and bell towers ====
In 1861, a side chapel attached to the main structure was built on the right side of the apse to venerate Nosso Senhor dos Passos. The bell towers were not present in André Soares' drawings. According to many engravings of that time, including a lithograph drawing by George Vivian, the initial appearance of the church façade was more open, making the central section stand out, enhancing the dynamic scenic effect of the wall's undulation. On 28 May 1862, the construction of the bell towers was initiated, a project led by Porto's architect Pedro Ferreira.

After the Count of Vila Pouca Theatre burned down on the night of 18 January 1841, the Afonso Henriques Theatre was built to replace it in 1853 and was inaugurated two years later. This new theatre, similarly to its predecessor, contributed in the completion of the church by donating the funds they received from plays and magic lantern slide shows. On 22 April 1863, the play O Veterano Mateus, the song "O Sebastianista" and the comedy A Actriz were played exclusively to raise money for the construction of the church's bell towers. There were many in attendance and the city's music played outside the theatre.

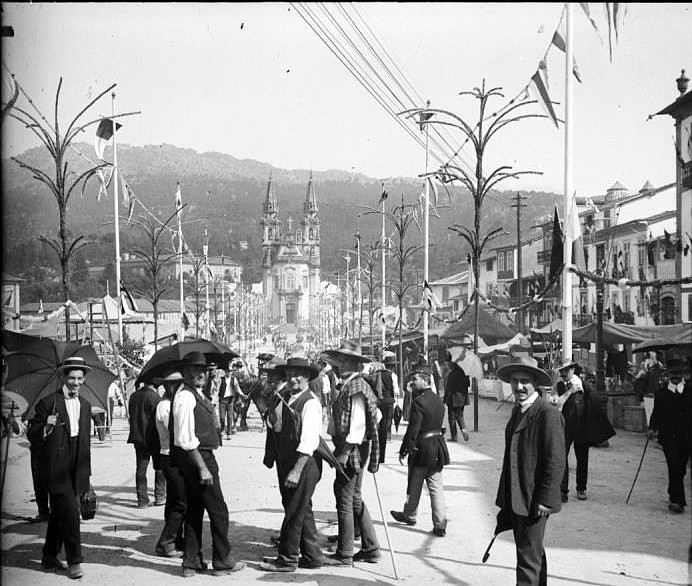
The Campo da Feira and Santos Passos Church in the 1908 Gualterianas.

The towers were completed in 1875, and on 28 May of that year, exactly 14 years after the construction of the towers began, they were given a new set of bells, which were also blessed. In 1878, it was awarded the title of Real Irmandade and the prerogative of Royal chapel by King Luís I.

At the time of their construction, it was noted that the towers were disproportionately large compared to the rest of the church, eliminating the unity of the original façade. The size of the towers was further accentuated by the surrounding area, at the time filled with low houses. The granite sculptures that decorated the bridge that runs along the axis of the church were later transferred to the church's façade, and its frontispiece was covered in azulejos. The current staircase in front of the church also dates back to the mid-19th century, with balustrades that convey a scenographic effect.

==== Interior ====
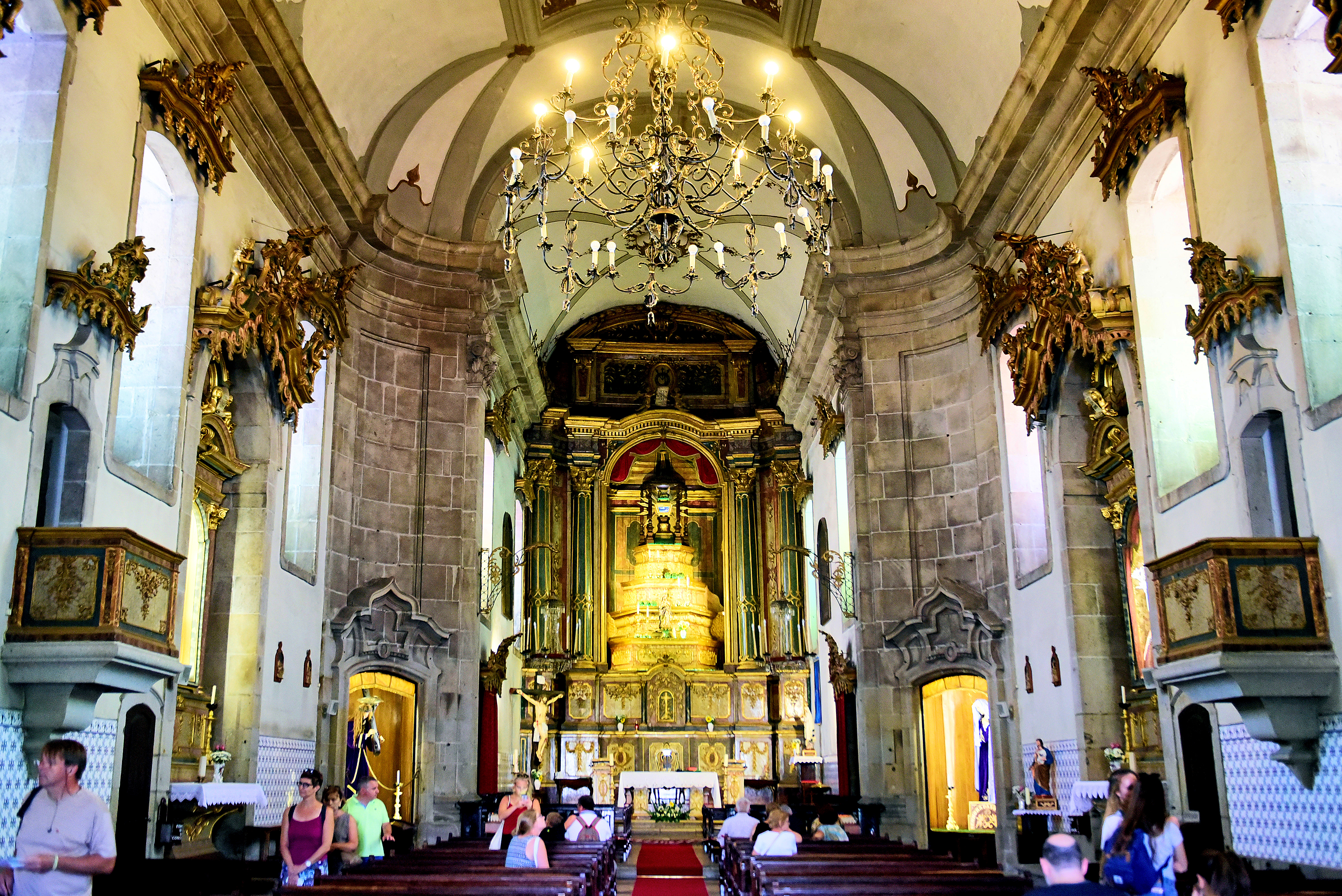
Interior of the Santos Passos Church in 2018

Inside the church, the neoclassical altarpiece in the chancel, painted in imitation of marble, was crafted by António José da Cunha in 1793. The four altarpieces in the nave, created by an unknown author, are from a transitional period between the rocaille and neoclassical style and feature panels depicting scenes from the life of Christ. They were created sometime before 1798, when the painters Marcelo Caetano da Silva and Manuel José Coimbra, both from Guimarães, were hired to paint and gild them.

=== Modern times ===
==== Preservation status ====
Despite significant transformations in its surroundings throughout its existence, the Santos Passos Church has remained relatively unchanged since the completion of its construction. This is in contrast to other nearby churches, such as São Paio Church, which was demolished in 1914, and the São Dâmaso Church, which was relocated close to the Castle of Guimarães between 1960 and 1966. Due to years of conservation efforts and restoration works, the church remains in pristine condition.

The Santos Passos Church is located in the Historic Centre of Guimarães, a World Heritage Site of UNESCO since 2001. It was declared a Public Interest Building along with its oratories via decree number 4593, D.R. 280 of 30 November 1993.

The Historic Centre of Guimarães is an example of the authenticity of our past and the genesis of the Portuguese nation. Its elevation to World Cultural Heritage will recognise the preservation of this authenticity. Portugal, the oldest nation in Europe, and Guimarães, its first capital, has earned this honour. It will be an expression of the importance of Historical Heritage throughout the world and a stimulus for all those who have been committed to its defence.

— António Magalhães (1998), Guimarães Cidade Património Mundial: Um Objectivo Estratétigo [Guimarães World Heritage City: A Strategic Objective], Alfredo Pimenta Municipal Archive

On 28 November 2025, the church inaugurated a new exterior light system in time for the 2025 edition of the Nicolinas. City Council president Ricardo Araújo described it as "a solution that protects and enhances the building, while avoiding intrusive interventions, and, thanks to digital technologies, allowing for enormous versatility in how we illuminate and celebrate this heritage".

==== Cultural impact ====
Santos Passos Church during the annual festival of Festas Gualterianas

The Santos Passos Church plays a significant role in the festivities of Guimarães, especially during the Gualterianas. The Procession of Saint Gualter, one of the Gualterianas' most important events, both begins and ends at the church. The Posses e Magusto, one of the festivities of the Nicolinas, also begins at the church. The Santos Passos Church is constantly illuminated with lights and adorned with seasonal decorations throughout the year, unlike most churches in the historic centre.

The Procession of Nosso Senhor dos Santos Passos is a national event; in Guimarães, it is organized by the Irmandade dos Santos Passos. The procession begins at the Santos Passos Church and travels through the Historic Centre of Guimarães, passing along São Dâmaso Boulevard, continuing through the Toural, and reaching Misericórdia Square before returning to the Santos Passos Church, ending the ceremony. It usually takes place every year in March or April, regardless of the weather.

== See also ==
- Campo da Feira
- List of religious buildings in Guimarães
- Historic Centre of Guimarães
- Religion in Portugal

== Bibliography ==
- Smith, Robert C. (1968). "A Casa da Câmara de Braga (1753-1756)", Bracara Augusta (in Portuguese). Vol. XXII. Braga. pp. 283–320.
- Smith, Robert C. (1973). André Soares, arquitecto do Minho [André Soares, architect of the Minho Region] (in Portuguese). Lisbon.
- Caldas, Antonio José Ferreira (1881). Guimarães: apontamentos para a sua historia (in Portuguese). Typ. de A. J. da Silva Teixeira.
- Gandra, Manuel J. (1973). "Guimarães", Dicionário da Arte Barroca em Portugal ["Guimarães", Dictionary of Baroque art in Portugal] (in Portuguese). Lisbon.
- Oliveira, Eduardo Pires de (2003). Os alvores do rococó em Guimarães e outros estudos sobre o barroco e o rococó do Minho (in Portuguese). Braga: APPACDM Distrital de Braga. pp. 15–61.
- Pais da Silva, Jorge Henrique (1993). Páginas de História da Arte [Art History Pages] (in Portuguese). Vol. II. Lisbon: Editorial Estampa.
- Pereira, José Fernandes (1989). "SOARES, André", Dicionário da Arte Barroca em Portugal ["SOARES, André", Dictionary of Baroque art in Portugal] (in Portuguese). Lisbon.
- Pina, Luiz de (1933). O Castelo de Guimarães [The Castle of Guimarães] (in Portuguese). Vila Nova de Gaia: Edições Pátria.
- Serrão, Vítor (2003). História da Arte em Portugal. O Barroco [History of Art in Portugal. The Baroque]. Lisbon: Editorial Presença.
- Sousa Bastos, Antonio (1908). Diccionario do theatro portuguez (in Portuguese). Robarts - University of Toronto. Lisboa Imprensa Libanio da Silva.
