= Torre dos Almadas =

Historic tower house in Guimarães, Portugal

Tower of the Almadas
- Torre dos Almadas
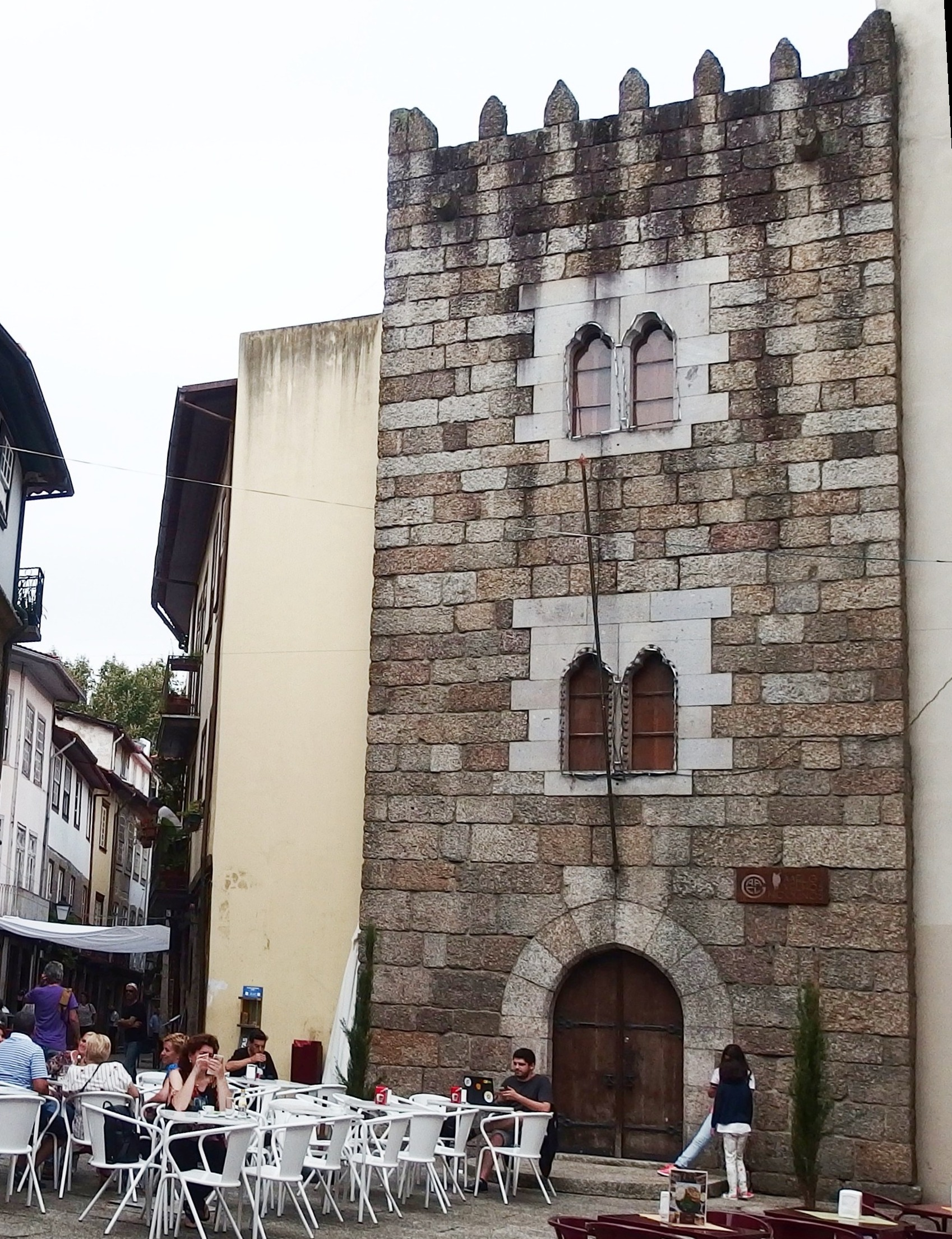
- Torre dos Almadas (2017)
- Interactive map of the Tower of the Almadas area
- Former names: Palace of the Almadas; Castle of the Almadas

General information
- Status: Inserted inside the GHC
- Architectural style: Gothic
- Classification: Tower house; Protected landmark
- Location: Oliveira, São Paio e São Sebastião, Guimarães, Portugal
- Coordinates: 41.44238°N 8.29381°W
- Completed: Sometime before 1279
- Renovated: 1974
- Demolished: Sometime between the 13th and 15th centuries
- Landlord: AAELG

Technical details
- Floor count: 3

The Tower of the Almadas (Portuguese: Torre dos Almadas) is a gothic medieval tower house in Guimarães, Portugal.

== History ==
Originally, the building formed part of a larger noble medieval residence built sometime prior to 1279, which was later mostly torn down sometime between the 13th and 15th centuries, along with other neighboring buildings, and reduced in size following the expansion and densification of the city centre. Following this demolition, the tower part of the house became exposed to the rest of the city, needing the addition of windows and an entrance gate.

In 1964 the city government (Câmara Municipal) of Guimarães leased the building to the Association of Former Students of the Guimarães High School (AAELG, in Portuguese). Since 1968, it serves as the headquarters of this association and is the official location where the annual Nicolinas Festivities committee is officialized. Prior to this, it was referred to as Palace of the Almadas, being then changed to Castle of the Almadas until being officially changed to its current name, Tower of the Almadas, on 29 November 1971.

The interior of the tower was restored and redone following a bomb explosion in 1974. In 2001 the Historic Centre of Guimarães, which the tower is part of, was designated as a UNESCO World Heritage Site.

== See also ==
- Guimarães
- Historic Centre of Guimarães
- List of buildings in Guimarães
