= Abação e Gémeos =

- Civil parish
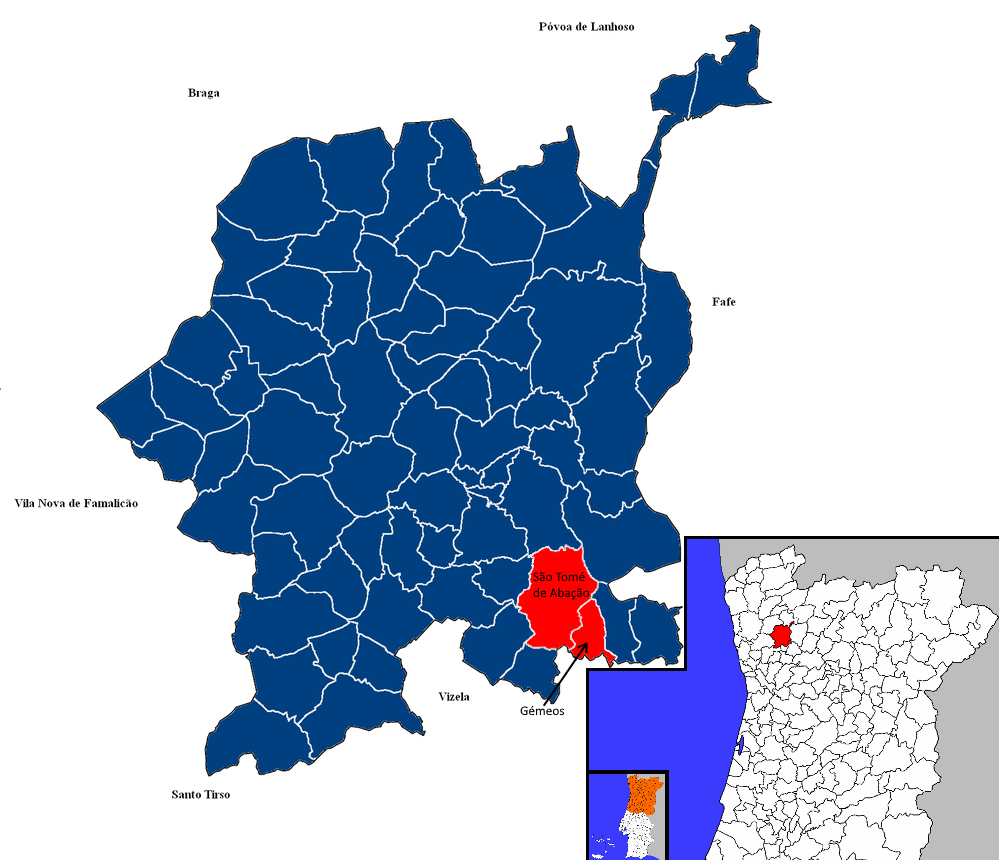
- Coordinates: 41.40549°N 8.26215°W
- Country: Portugal
- Region: Norte
- Intermunic. comm.: Ave
- District: Braga
- Municipality: Guimarães

Area
  - Total: 6.73 km^{2} (2.60 sq mi)

Population (2021)
  - Total: 2,683
  - Density: 399/km^{2} (1,030/sq mi)
- Time zone: UTC+00:00 (WET)
  - Summer (DST): UTC+01:00 (WEST)
- Website: https://www.freguesias-lof.pt/pt/

Abação e Gémeos (officially: União das Freguesias de Abação e Gémeos) is a civil parish in the municipality of Guimarães, Portugal. It was formed in 2013 by the merger of the former parishes Abação and Gémeos. The population in 2021 was 2,683, in an area of 6.73 km^{2}.

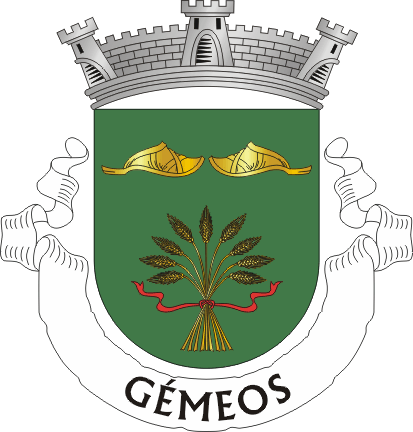
Gémeos coat of arms
