= Azurém =

- Civil parish
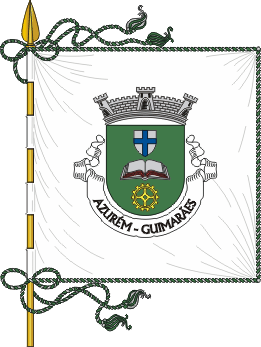
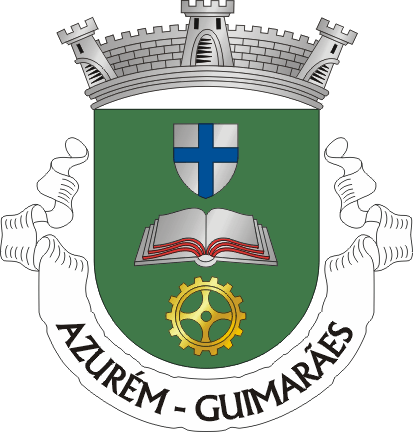
- Flag Coat of arms

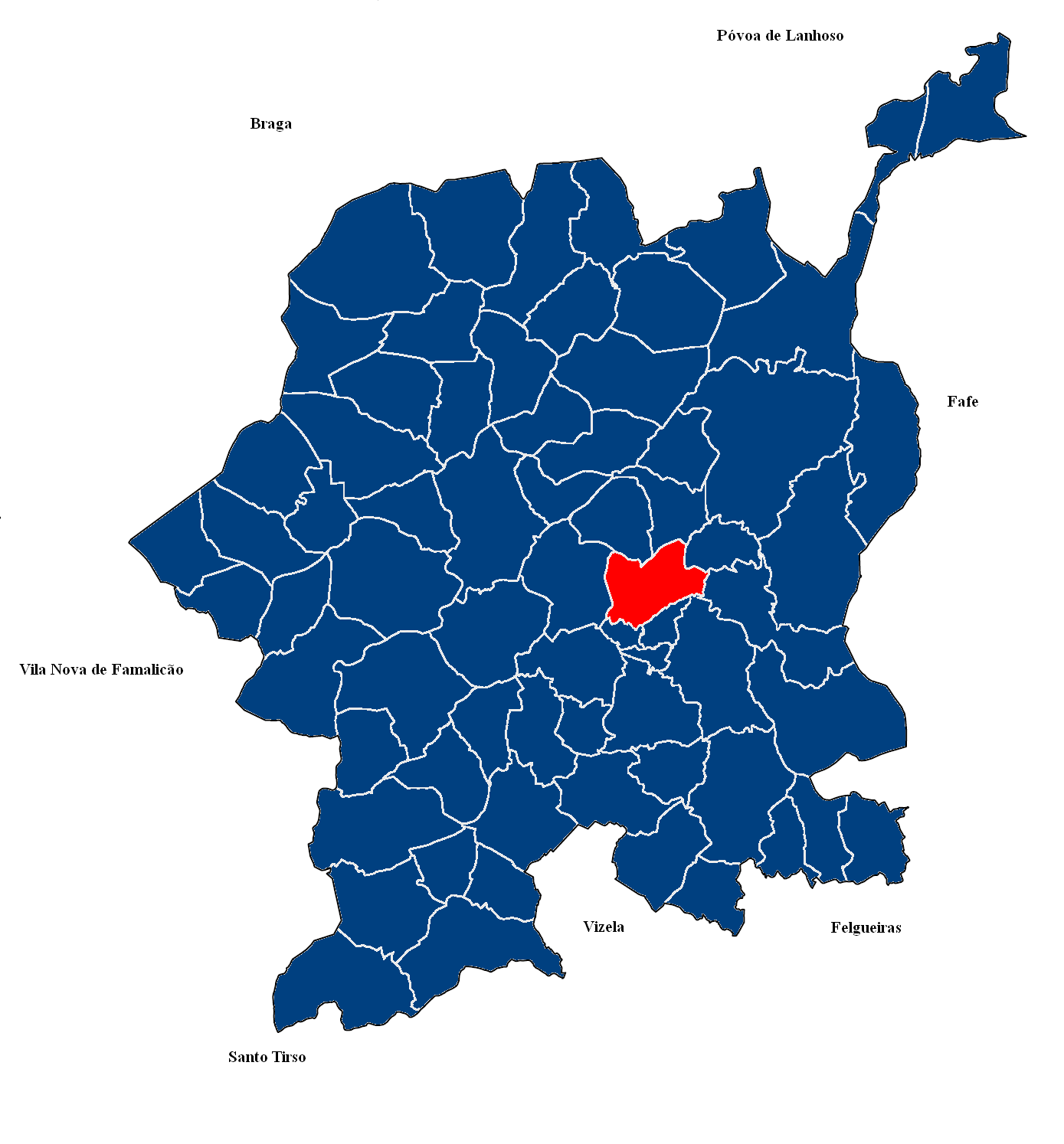
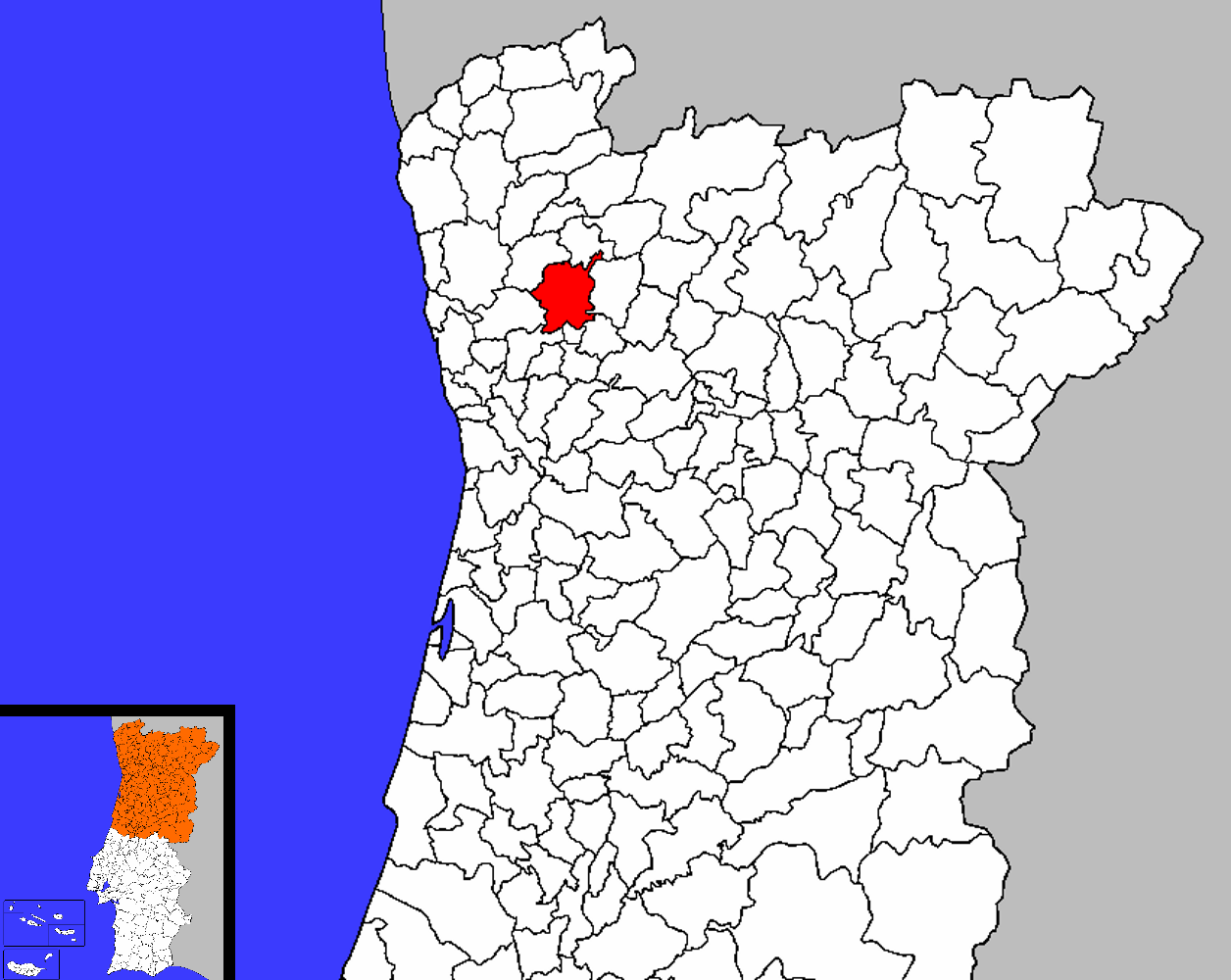
- Coordinates: 41.45637°N 8.29103°W
- Country: Portugal
- Region: Norte
- Intermunic. comm.: Ave
- District: Braga
- Municipality: Guimarães

Area
  - Total: 2.9 km^{2} (1.1 sq mi)

Population (2021)
  - Total: 9,090
  - Density: 3,100/km^{2} (8,100/sq mi)
- Time zone: UTC+00:00 (WET)
  - Summer (DST): UTC+01:00 (WEST)

Azurém is a civil parish in the municipality of Guimarães in the Braga District of Portugal. The population in 2021 was 9,090, in an area of 2.9 km^{2}.

One of the campus of the University of Minho if located here.
