= Historic Centre of Guimarães =

UNESCO World Heritage Site
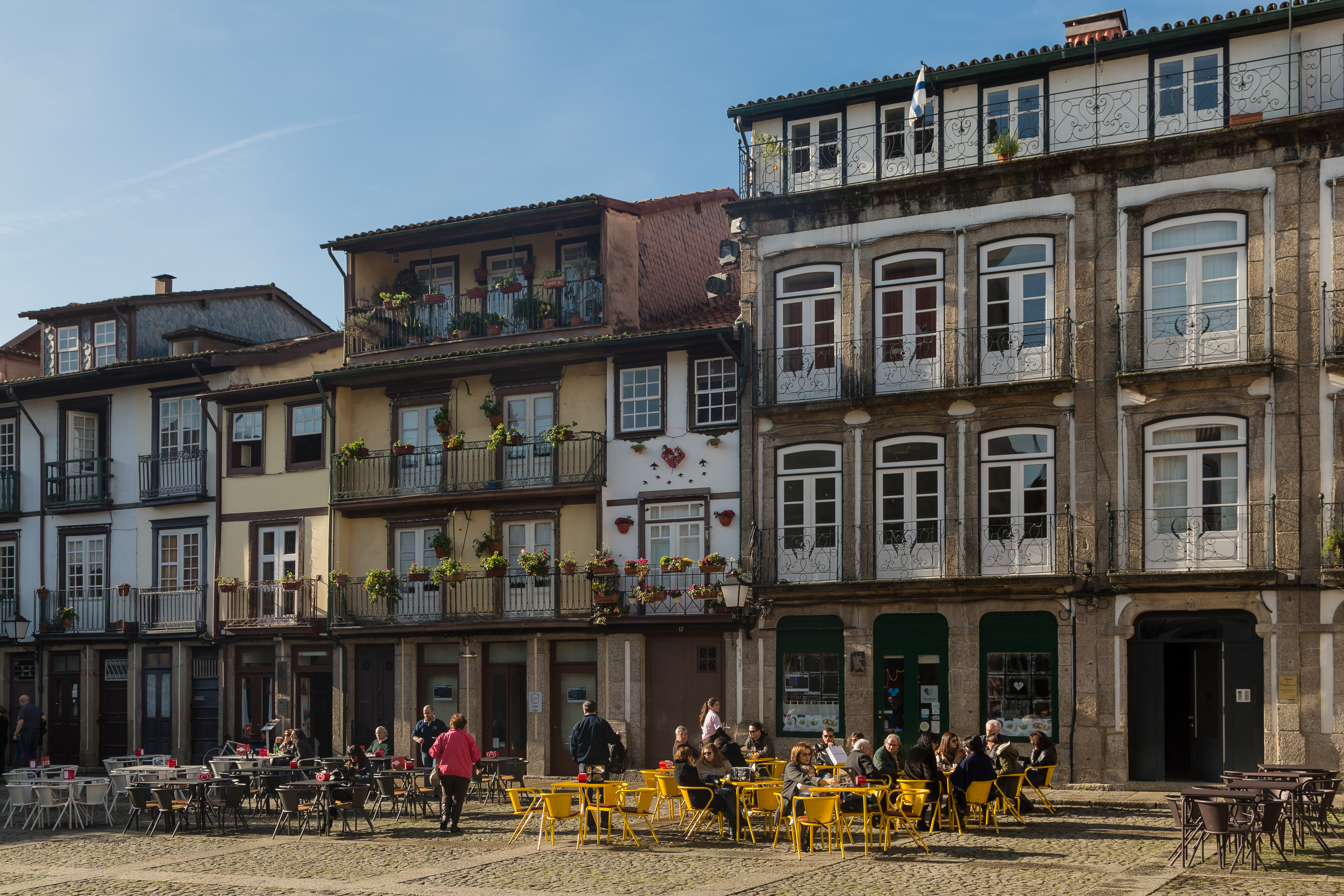
- Largo da Oliveira (or Praça da Oliveira) is a square located in the historic centre of Guimarães.

- Location within Portugal
- Location: Guimarães, Portugal
- Criteria: Cultural: (ii), (iii), (iv)
- Reference: 1031
- Inscription: 2001 (25th Session)
- Area: 19.45 ha (48.1 acres)
- Buffer zone: 99.23 ha (245.2 acres)
- Coordinates: 41°26′37.432″N 8°17′34.091″W

Historic Centre of Guimarães is an urban area in the city of Guimarães, Portugal. Dating back to the Middle Ages, it covers an area of 16 hectares and retains many buildings constructed from medieval times until the 19th century. In 2001, it was designated as a UNESCO World Heritage Site.

Guimarães is closely linked to the formation of Portuguese national identity and the Portuguese language in the 12th century. It is the birthplace of Afonso Henriques, the first King of Portugal, who declared the country's independence in 1139.

== Gallery ==
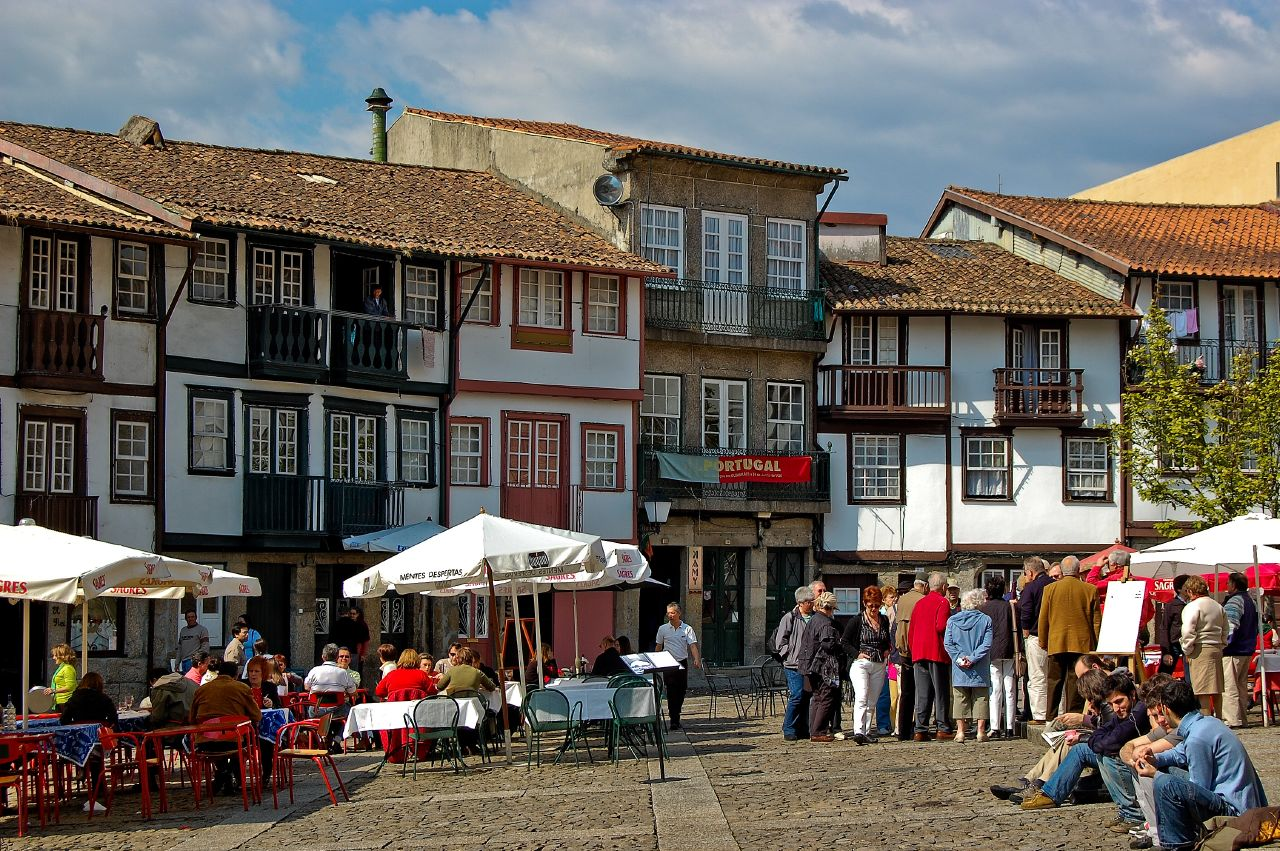
Medieval buildings in Praça de Santiago

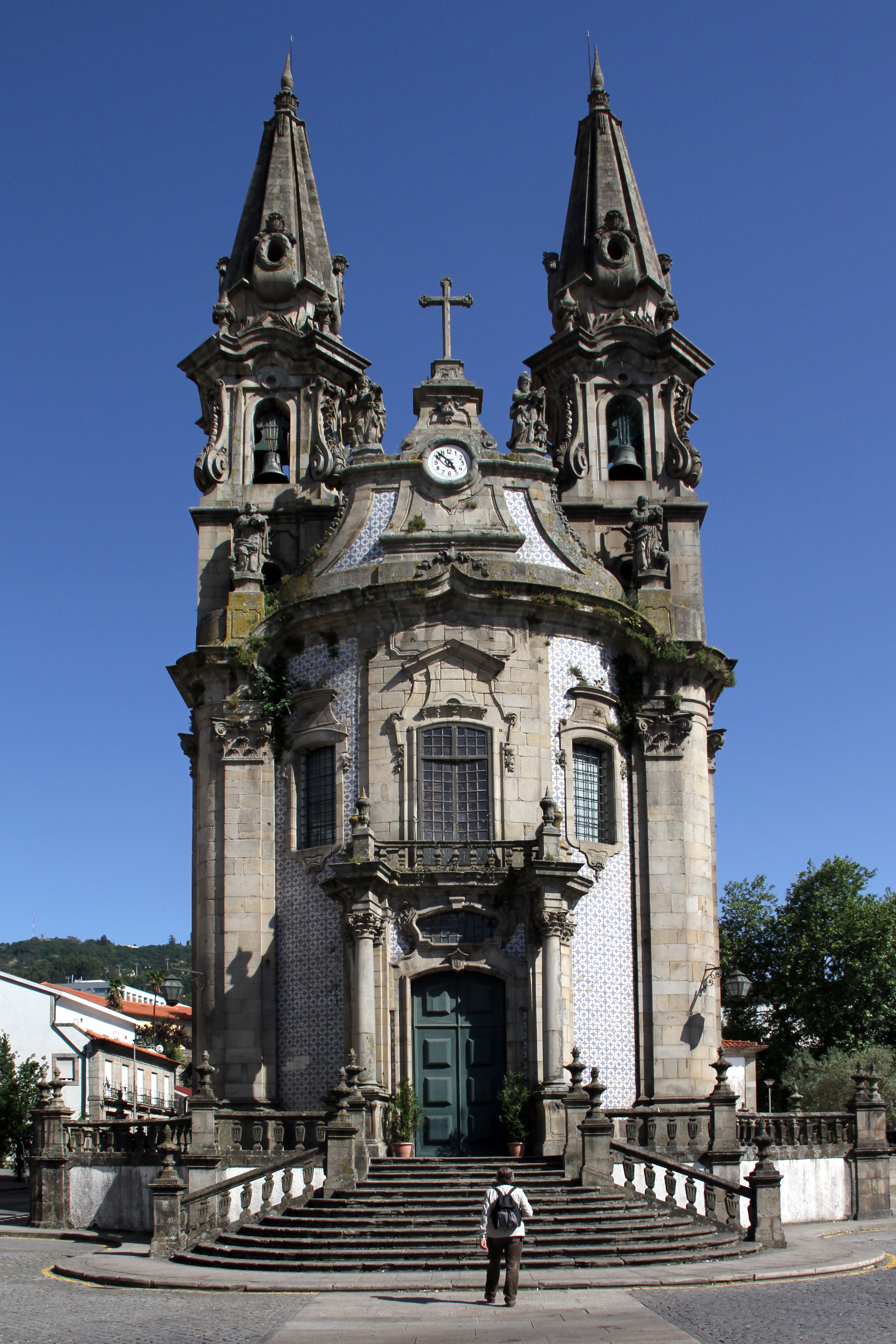
Santos Passos Church

Castle of Guimarães

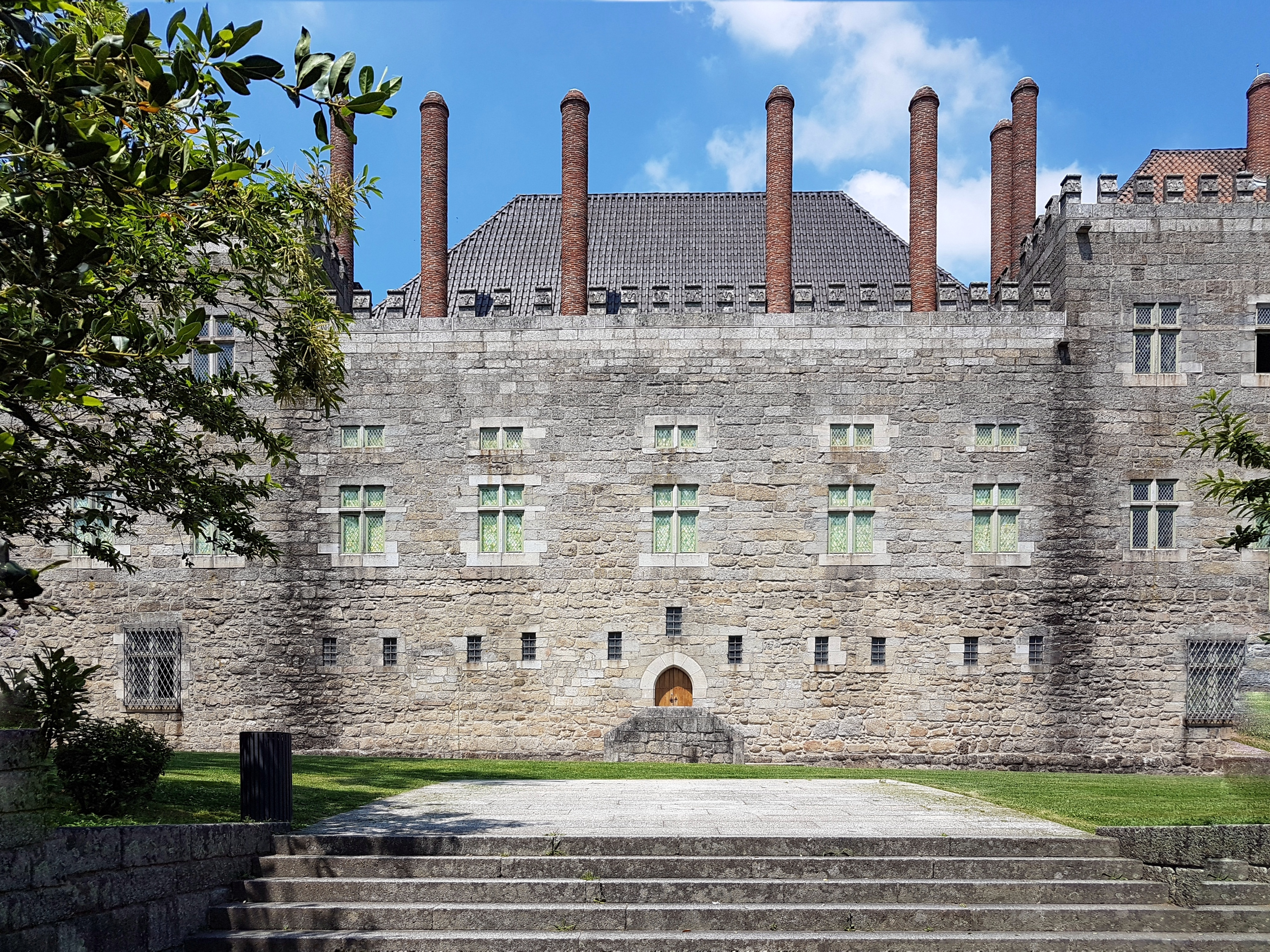
Palace of the Dukes of Braganza

Paços do Concelho, the old city hall

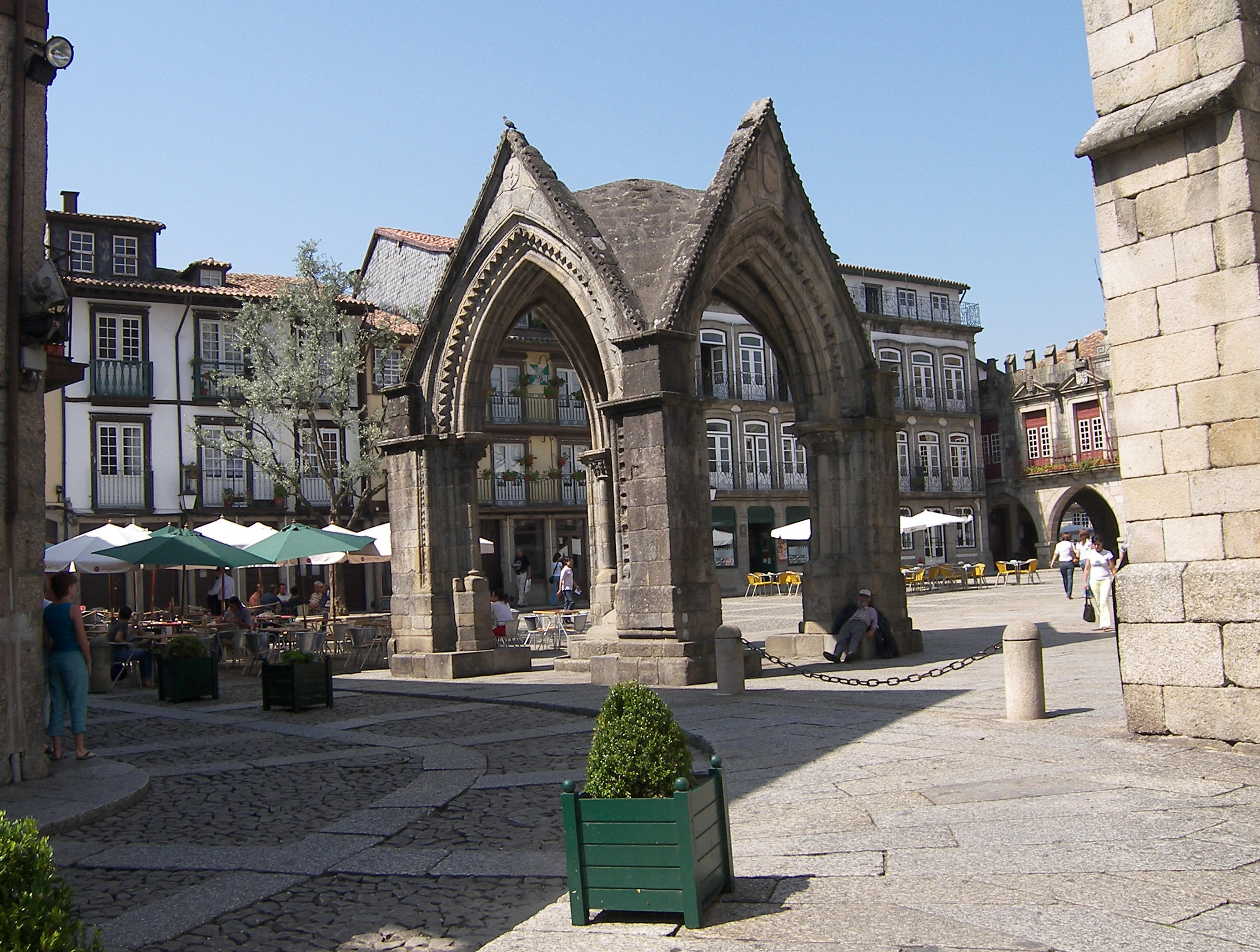
Largo da Oliveira and the Padrão do Salado

Largo da Oliveira and the Igreja de Nossa Senhora da Oliveira

Rua de Santa Maria

== See also ==
- Guimarães
- List of buildings in Guimarães
- Guimarães Castle
