= List of buildings and structures in Guimarães =

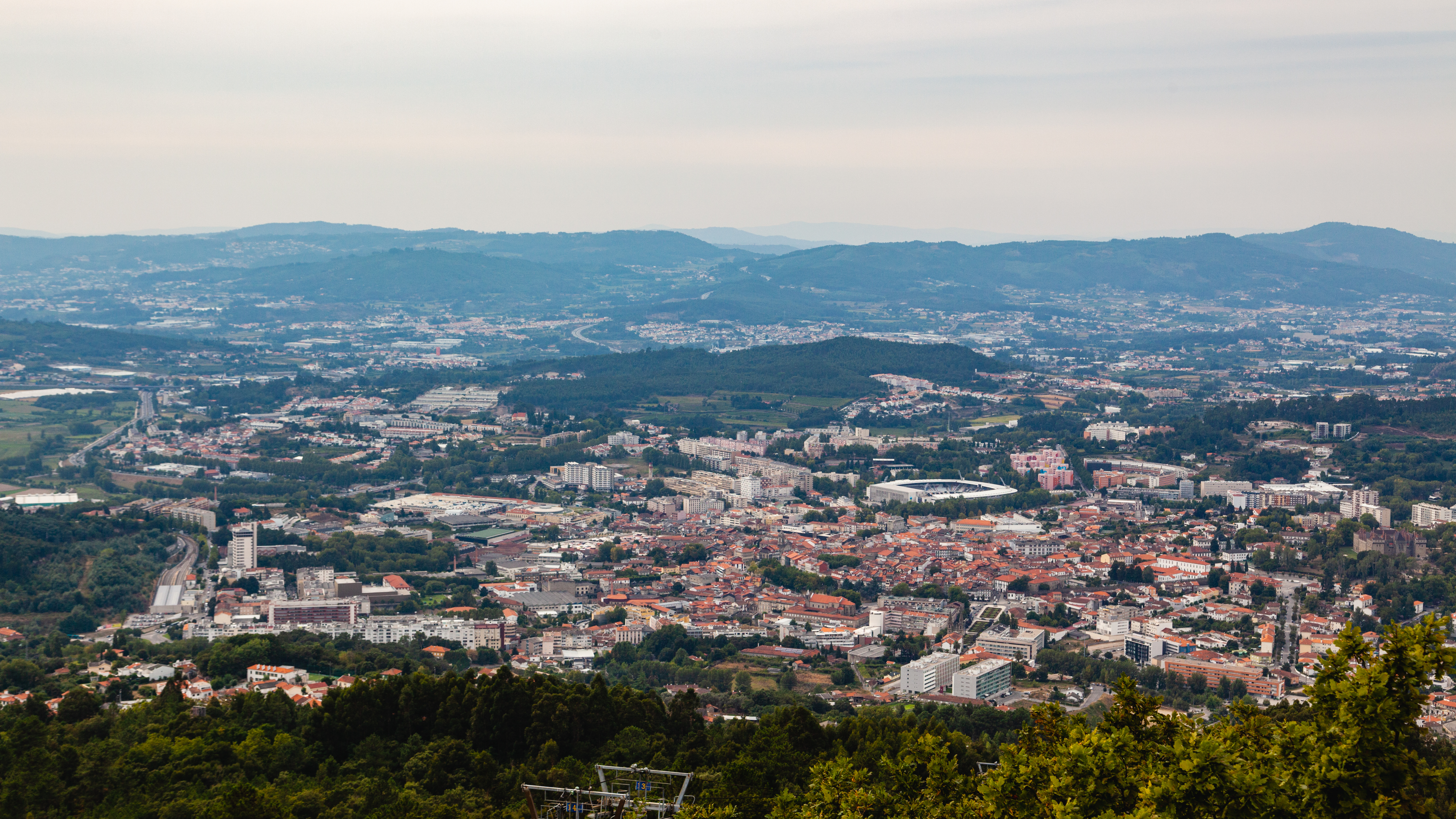
Photograph from the Penha Sanctuary picturing the city of Guimarães in 2013

Known as the "Birthplace of Portugal" or "The Cradle City", Guimarães played a crucial role in the foundation of the oldest nation state in the world, serving as its first capital and the site of the Battle of São Mamede in 1128, where Portugal secured its independence from the Kingdom of Galicia. It received its Foral around 1096, the first one ever, by Count Henry, father of the first king Portugal, Afonso Henriques, who's said to have been born in Guimarães. This historical significance has contributed to its architectural heritage, spanning from the pre-medieval period to contemporary times. The city's historic center is designated as a UNESCO World Heritage Site since 2001, being further expanded in 2023 to also include the Couros Zone, increasing the area of protected buildings significantly.

Its eleven centuries of contiguous habitation allowed a wide range of buildings, from gothic fortifications like the Castle of Guimarães and the city's medieval walls, to Baroque palaces, religious institutions, medieval noble houses and quintas, and other contemporary constructions. Many of these structures are either protected as national monuments or properties of public and municipal interest, or registered in the Directorate-General for Cultural Heritage via SIPA or IGESPAR.

== Buildings ==
=== Historic landmarks ===
Most important and iconic historical landmarks of Guimarães, from distinct time periods, that had a big impact on the history of the city and of Portugal.

Historic landmarks in Guimarães
Name	Location	Description	Image	Construction	Coordinates
Alfândega Tower	Oliveira, São Paio e São Sebastião	Last standing defensive tower of the medieval fortifications of Guimarães, used as a publicity billboard between the early 1900s and 1934 (date of its restoration). It holds the iconic Aqui Nasceu Portugal (Here Portugal Was Born) sign, reminding everyone that Portugal's independence was achieved in the premises of the city, that was added in the 1960s. On 3 August 2024 a museum was inaugurated inside the Alfândega Tower.	Alfândega Tower	1200s	41.44136°N 8.29501°W
Castle of Guimarães	Oliveira, São Paio e São Sebastião	It was built under the orders of Mumadona Dias in the 10th century to defend the city from attacks by Moors and Norsemen.	Castle of Guimarães	900s	41.44793°N 8.29043°W
Castro houses	Briteiros São Salvador e Briteiros Santa Leocádia and Sande São Lourenço e Balazar	Typical houses of the Pre-Roman inhabitants of northern Portugal, called Castros. Guimarães has two conglomerates of Castro houses, called Citânias: the Citânia de Briteiros and the Citânia de Sabroso.	Castro houses at the Citânia de Briteiros	200 BC/100 BC	41.52787°N 8.31568°W and 41.51191°N 8.34149°W
Medieval Wall	Oliveira, São Paio e São Sebastião	Surviving stretch of the medieval fortifications that surrounded Guimarães, built between 1265 and 1318 during the reigns of kings Afonso III and Dinis I.	Surviving part of the Medieval Walls of Guimarães	1265-1318	41.44372°N 8.29158°W
Paços do Concelho de Guimarães	Oliveira, São Paio e São Sebastião	It served as the old City Hall of Guimarães and later as an art gallery.	Paços do Concelho de Guimarães	Before 1612	41.44316°N 8.29301°W
Padrão do Salado	Oliveira, São Paio e São Sebastião	Monument commissioned by Afonso IV of Portugal in commemoration for the victory at the Battle of Río Salado.	Padrão do Salado	1340	41.44284°N 8.29279°W
Palace of the Dukes of Braganza (Paço dos Duques)	Oliveira, São Paio e São Sebastião	Old palace of the Dukes of Braganza, now used as a museum and the official residence of the President in northern Portugal.	Paço dos Duques	1420	41.446485°N 8.290807°W

=== Residential buildings ===
List of notable buildings initially intended for residential use, mostly casas (houses) or quintas of rich and noble families.

Residential buildings in Guimarães
Name	Location	Description	Image	Construction	Coordinates
Affordable Housing District	Oliveira, São Paio e São Sebastião	Small complex made up of four four-storey buildings. On the opposite side of the street stands the Martins Sarmento High School.	Affordable Housing District	1970	41.44492°N 8.28870°W
As Filipinas	Oliveira, São Paio e São Sebastião	Four houses on the Camões Street denominated as "As Filipinas" (The Philippines). They follow modest renaissance architecture. They suffered a partial fire on 23 October 2009.	As Filipinas houses	1500s/1600s	41.44088°N 8.29745°W
Botequim do Vagomestre	Toural; Oliveira, São Paio e São Sebastião	The Botequim do Vagomestre was both a Botequim and a Social club that opened around 1816 and closed in 1894. Liberalist ideas were often discussed here as these were highly unpopular at that time, forcing the place to go through regular periods without clients due to fear. Author Camilo Castelo Branco and Martins Sarmento met at the establishment in more than one occasion. It is currently a Teahouse and the municipal headquarters of the Portuguese Socialist Party.	The Botequim do Vagomestre building	1700s	41.44183°N 8.29600°W
Café Milenário Building	Oliveira, São Paio e São Sebastião	19th century buildings at the entrance of the Toural, next to the Alfândega Tower, that houses the Café Milenário, the most famous café of the city and birthplace of Vitória S.C.	Café Milenário Building	1800s	41.44144°N 8.29519°W
Casa Correia de Matos	Oliveira, São Paio e São Sebastião	House designed by José Marques da Silva for the Correia de Matos family.	Casa Correia de Matos	1902	41.43990°N 8.29543°W
Casa da Caldeiroa	Oliveira, São Paio e São Sebastião	House in the Caldeiroa Street that is being used as refuge to migrant children from war-torn countries, it was inaugurated in 2023.	Casa da Caldeiroa	Previous building adapted in 2022	41.43990°N 8.29616°W
Casa da Covilhã	Fermentões	This noble early 17th century house suffered various changes and expansions across the centuries, the first being from 1705 and the last from 1963 and then between 1973 and 1976, where architect Fernando Távora partially remodeled the house with his signature modernist style. It received the Public Interest Monument status in 2020.	Casa da Covilhã	Sometime between 1600 and 1625	41.44871°N 8.31540°W
Casa da Espinhosa	Azurém	The Casa da Espinhosa, or Casa Francisco Costa, is an Art Nouveau house designed by José Marques da Silva in 1921 and built in 1923.	Casa da Espinhosa	1923	41.44935°N 8.29934°W
Casa da Família Ribeiro da Silva	Oliveira, São Paio e São Sebastião	Noble house built in the late 1600s or early 1700s located at the Misericórdia Square.	Casa da Família Ribeiro da Silva	1600s/1700s	41.44264°N 8.29499°W
Casa da Granja	Creixomil	Nobel house built by stonemason João Pinto de Sousa in 1713.	Casa da Granja	1713	41.44185°N 8.30337°W
Casa da Ribeira	Ponte	14th century noble house with 17th, 18th and 19th century modifications.	Casa da Ribeira	1300s	41.47298°N 8.34020°W
Casa da Rua Nova	Oliveira, São Paio e São Sebastião	Extremely well preserved example of noble Portuguese medieval architecture.	Casa da Rua Nova	1300s	41.44158°N 8.29336°W
Casa das Corujeiras	Infantas				
Casa das Hortas	Oliveira, São Paio e São Sebastião	Manor house in Guimarães with a coat of arms.	Casa das Hortas	Late 1700s	41.44252°N 8.28854°W
Casa das Lameiras	Creixomil	The Casa das Lameiras is a noble house that, after decades of abandonment, underwent an extensive restoration project between 1994 and 1995 as part of the broader Guimarães Shopping project, being repurposed into a Castello Lopes cinema.	Casa das Lameiras	Late 1600s or early 1700s	41.44037°N 8.30190°W
Casa das Rótulas	Oliveira, São Paio e São Sebastião	Prime example of medieval architecture in Portugal.	Casa das Rótulas	1600s	41.44388°N 8.29431°W
Casa de Caneiros	Fermentões	Manor house built on top of the ruins of the previous Casa de Caneiros from the 1500s.	Casa de Caneiros	1770	41.45503°N 8.30984°W
Casa de Cimães	Oliveira, São Paio e São Sebastião	Baroque house of the Pinto Coelho family, partially destroyed due to a fire in 2016.	Casa de Cimães	1700s	41.44039°N 8.29787°W
Casa de Dardos	Creixomil	Granite rural house built sometime before the mid-1500s, with later alterations, now incorporated in the Horta Pedagógica de Guimarães complex.		Before 1550	41.43615°N 8.30544°W
Casa de Donães	Oliveira, São Paio e São Sebastião	Peculiar corner house covered in Azulejos, restored in 2016.	Casa de Donães	1800s	41.44216°N 8.29276°W
Casa de Gonça	Gonça	Early 20th-century house, located in Gonça, that exhibits the characteristics of whats called a "Brazilian's house", a style that emerged in the mid to late 19th and early 20th centuries by Brazilians who returned to Portugal after acquiring substantial wealth.		1906	41.50989°N 8.24985°W
Casa de Margaride	Mesão Frio	Noble rural 16th century house, that traces its roots to the 11th century, where Portugal's Tree of the Year of 2024, the Camélia, is located.	Casa de Margaride	1500s	41.45031°N 8.27717°W
Casa de Minotes	Fermentões	Baroque 15th century noble house with modifications from the 1600s to 1800s. It was restored in the 1970s to 1980s.	Casa de Minotes	1400s	41.46282°N 8.30518°W
Casa de Sezim	Nespereira	Noble house known internationally for its Vinho Verde production.	Casa de Sezim	1300s	41.41498°N 8.32822°W
Casa do Alto	Nespereira	In the 20th century, Raul Brandão reconstructed and restored the house and lived here for long periods of time.		1560	41.40161°N 8.32520°W
Casa do Assento	Leitões, Oleiros e Figueiredo	Mannerist 17th-century house with 19th-century expansions.	Casa do Assento	1600s	41.47019°N 8.38214°W
Casa do Arco	Oliveira, São Paio e São Sebastião	The Paço Fernão de Sousa or Casa dos Condes de Azenha, popularly known as Casa do Arco (House of the Arch), is a 15th-century house at the Santa Maria Street where kings Manuel I and Miguel I stayed while passing through the city.	Casa do Arco	1400s	41.44396°N 8.29278°W
Casa do Barão de Pombeiro	Oliveira, São Paio e São Sebastião	19th century house in the revivalist Tudor style, replacing the typical wooden frames with the more abundant granite. It was originally owned by a Baron and it later became a kindergarten in 1974. It is located in the extermity of the Santa Maria Street.	Casa do Barão de Pombeiro	Sometime between 1850 and 1870	41.44517°N 8.29274°W
Casa do Bravo	Urgezes	19th century manor house. It suffered a big fire in 1875. It was rebuilt in 1937.	Casa do Bravo	1800s	41.42708°N 8.28723°W
Casa do Cabido (Alberto Sampaio Museum)	Oliveira, São Paio e São Sebastião	The Casa do Cabido is a Baroque house built sometime between 1700 and 1750, with further modifications in the late 18th century. It served as the Caixa Geral de Depósitos for several decades until a new facility at the Toural was inaugurated in 1960 to serve this function. Founded in 1928, the Alberto Sampaio Museum expanded into the now-vacant Casa do Cabido during the 1960s, with its new space inaugurated in 1967. The interior was partially modernized between 1999 and 2004.	Alberto Sampaio Museum (Casa do Cabido)	Sometime between 1700 and 1750	41.44268°N 8.29231°W
Casa do Carmo	Oliveira, São Paio e São Sebastião	The Casa do Carmo or Casa dos Conde Margaride, is a noble house that often received the Portuguese kings at the city of Guimarães.	Casa do Carmo	Late 1700s or early 1800s	41.44637°N 8.29268°W
Casa do Carvalhal	Guardizela	Manueline 18th century tower house.		1700s	41.38993°N 8.36692°W
Casa do Castro	Oliveira, São Paio e São Sebastião	The Casa do Castro is a traditional house located at the D. João IV Avenue. It is currently used as a restaurant.	Casa do Castro	1700s/1800s	41.43802°N 8.29135°W
Casa do Cidade	Oliveira, São Paio e São Sebastião	House with an oratory built in 1866. It is being used as a youth hostel since 2004. Its name derives from the nickname of one of its residents, José Fernandes da Silva, known as “O Cidade”, who was one of the main drivers of the tanning industry in the city in the 19th century.	Casa no Largo do Cidade	1800s	41.43987°N 8.29302°W
Casa do Costeado	Creixomil	Noble house. It suffered a massive fire on 6 April 1948. In 2024 it went through restoration and rehabilitation works, to be turned into a school/hotel.	Casa do Costeado	Late 1700s	41.43793°N 8.30357°W
Casa do Fidalgo do Toural	Toural; Oliveira, São Paio e São Sebastião	Manor house at the Toural Square that serves as a bank since 1878.	Casa do Fidalgo do Toural	1721	41.44200°N 8.29616°W
Casa do Largo de Santa Luzia	Oliveira, São Paio e São Sebastião	Noble house where Francisco Agra lived.	Casa do Largo de Santa Luzia	1800s	41.44542°N 8.29568°W
Casa do Leite	Oliveira, São Paio e São Sebastião	19th century noble house located at the Santa Maria Street, besides the Raul Brandão Municipal Library. It was restored between 1990 and 1993.	Casa do Leite	Sometime between 1865 and 1890	41.44442°N 8.29292°W
Casa do Morgado da Índia	Oliveira, São Paio e São Sebastião	Noble house prized for its preservation status, located in the small section of the Santa Maria Street that passes through the Santiago Square.	Casa do Morgado da Índia	1500s	41.44373°N 8.29265°W
Casa do Morgado dos Almeidas	Oliveira, São Paio e São Sebastião	Extremely well preserved 17th century noble house.	Casa do Morgado dos Almeidas	Before 1681	41.44276°N 8.29378°W
Casa do Outeiro	Serzedo e Calvos	Example of a "Brazilian's house", a style that emerged in the mid to late 19th and early 20th centuries by Brazilians who returned to Portugal after acquiring substantial wealth.		Late 1800s	41.40547°N 8.22808°W
Casa do Paço	Fermentões	House with early 1500s origins, later modified and expanded to hold a mold and machine factory.		1500s	41.46381°N 8.32326°W
Casa do Proposto	Oliveira, São Paio e São Sebastião	Noble house and former industrial school where Bernardo Pinheiro Correia de Melo was born.	Casa do Proposto	1710	41.44373°N 8.29912°W
Casa do Ribeiro	São Cristóvão de Selho	Baroque noble house with rococo features. It has been used as a TH since 1984.		1688	41.41733°N 8.34636°W
Casa dos Amarais	Oliveira, São Paio e São Sebastião	17th century noble house located at the Feira do Pão, currently used as a TH.	Casa dos Amarais	1700s	41.44196°N 8.29413°W
Casa dos Araújo e Abreu	Oliveira, São Paio e São Sebastião	Noble house, used as a B&B since the early 2000s.	Casa dos Araújo e Abreu	1600s	41.44359°N 8.29458°W
Casa dos Borges Pais do Amaral	Oliveira, São Paio e São Sebastião	Also known as Casa dos Coelho Nogueira, the Casa dos Borges Pais do Amaral is a noble house built sometime between the 15th and 18th centuries, located at the Caldeiroa Street. Its current structure likely dates to the latter two centuries of this period.	Casa dos Borges Pais do Amaral	1600s/1700s	41.44021°N 8.29567°W
Casa dos Braganças de Cete	Oliveira, São Paio e São Sebastião	The Casa dos Braganças de Cete is a Rococo noble house located at the Santa Maria Street.	Casa dos Braganças de Cete	1700s	41.44499°N 8.29270°W
Casa dos Carneiros (Raul Brandão Municipal Library)	Oliveira, São Paio e São Sebastião	Noble house, currently used as the municipal library of Guimarães.	Raul Brandão Municipal Library (Casa dos Carneiros)	1834	41.44422°N 8.29291°W
Casa dos Carvalhos	Oliveira, São Paio e São Sebastião	Manor house of the majorat of the Carvalhos in the Santa Maria Street.	Casa dos Carvalhos	1500s	41.44457°N 8.29286°W
Casa dos Condes de Vila Pouca	Oliveira, São Paio e São Sebastião	Noble house, currently used as a religious institute and a kindergarten.	Casa dos Condes de Vila Pouca	1700s	41.44060°N 8.28820°W
Casa dos Coutos (Tribunal da relação of Guimarães)	Oliveira, São Paio e São Sebastião	Noble house, currently used as one of the 5 tribunais da relação of Portugal.	Casa dos Coutos	1600s	41.44263°N 8.29453°W
Casa dos Freitas do Amaral	Toural; Oliveira, São Paio e São Sebastião	Also known as Casa do Guardal, paying homage to the former residence of the Freitas do Amaral family in Guimarães, which was destroyed during the Portuguese Civil War, it stands today as the sole surviving house in the Toural adorned with a coat of arms.	Casa dos Freitas do Amaral	Late 1700s	41.44091°N 8.29533°W
Casa dos Laranjais	Oliveira, São Paio e São Sebastião	Noble medieval house, known for its tower and orange groves (Laranjais in Portuguese) that give the house its name.	Casa dos Laranjais	1300s	41.44473°N 8.29381°W
Casa dos Lobatos	Urgezes	Noble house in the Caldeiroa Street where the Banda dos Guises was founded.	Casa dos Lobatos	1773	41.43964°N 8.29634°W
Casa dos Lobos Machados	Oliveira, São Paio e São Sebastião	Rococo style noble house where the Commercial and Industrial Association of Guimarães was founded in 1865. 15th century walls, 13th century ceramic and coins from the reign of Afonso V and Sebastian I where found here during excavations in the 2000s.	Casa dos Lobos Machados	1754	41.44235°N 8.29448°W
Casa dos Marqueses de Lindoso	Azurém	Noble house built in the 19th century located next to the Campo de São Mamede and the São Dâmaso Church.	Casa dos Marqueses de Lindoso	1800s	41.44943°N 8.28921°W
Casa dos Moreira do Vale	Oliveira, São Paio e São Sebastião	18th century noble house, currently used as a funeral parlor.	Casa dos Moreira de Vale	1700s	41.44202°N 8.29677°W
Casa dos Navarro de Andrade (Alfredo Pimenta Municipal Archive)	Oliveira, São Paio e São Sebastião	Noble house used as the municipal archive of Guimarães since 1952.	Alfredo Pimenta Municipal Archive (Casa dos Navarro de Andrade)	1600s	41.44398°N 8.29356°W
Casa dos Peixotos	Oliveira, São Paio e São Sebastião	First of the many noble houses at the Santa Maria Street after leaving the Oliveira Square.	Casa dos Peixotos	1700s	41.44338°N 8.29260°W
Casa dos Pombais	Creixomil	16th century nobel house, now a 3 star hotel.	Casa dos Pombais	1500s	41.44223°N 8.30322°W
Casa dos Portugais	Oliveira, São Paio e São Sebastião	Noble baroque house next to the Alfredo Pimenta Municipal Arquive and the Casa das Rótulas.	Casa dos Portugais	Sometime between 1498 and 1750	41.44374°N 8.29378°W
Casa dos Ribeiro de Carvalho	Oliveira, São Paio e São Sebastião	Noble baroque house of Branco Ribeiro de Carvalho, a knight of the Military Order of Christ. It is now used as a labor court.	Casa dos Ribeiro de Carvalho	1761	41.44210°N 8.29658°W
Casa dos Sá Osório	Oliveira, São Paio e São Sebastião	The Casa dos Sá Osório, is a nobel house at the Camões street built sometime between the 18th and 19th centuries.	Casa dos Sá Osório	1700s/1800s	41.44128°N 8.29667°W
Casa dos Santoalha	Oliveira, São Paio e São Sebastião	The Casa dos Santoalha, Casa do Canto or Quinta do Campo, is a noble house and a popular stop during the Moinas of the Nicolinas.	Casa dos Santoalha	1700s	41.43862°N 8.29067°W
Casa dos Valadares de Carvalho	Oliveira, São Paio e São Sebastião	Last of the houses at the Santa Maria Street going up from the Oliveira Square. It dates from the 15th century.	Casa dos Valadares de Carvalho	1400s	41.44518°N 8.29249°W
Casa dos Valadares de Vasconcelos	Oliveira, São Paio e São Sebastião	17th century noble house near the Santiago Square.	Casa dos Valadares de Vasconcelos	1600s	41.44349°N 8.29369°W
Casa Dr. António Rocha	Oliveira, São Paio e São Sebastião	Modernist house designed by the architects Luís José Oliveira Martins and Delfim Amorim.	Casa Dr. António Rocha	1947	41.44538°N 8.29380°W
Casa Martins Sarmento	Oliveira, São Paio e São Sebastião	Neoclassic house built by Francisco Martins Sarmento in the mid-1800s.	Casa Martins Sarmento	Between 1833 and 1884	41.44562°N 8.29332°W
Casa Mota-Prego	Oliveira, São Paio e São Sebastião	Now mostly used as a restaurant, it received the Public Interest Building status in 2018 via the decree n.º 980/2018, DR, 2.ª série, n.º 202/2018 and the Municipal Interest Building status in 2019 via the decree n.º 352/2019, DR, 2.ª série, n.º 52/2019.	Casa Mota-Prego	1500s	41.44331°N 8.29444°W
Casa Pedro Álvares de Almada	Oliveira, São Paio e São Sebastião	Former tower house named Torre dos Mirandas, featuring a Manueline window, which later belonged to Pedro Álvares de Almada.	Torre dos Mirandas	Sometime between 1279 and 1498	41.44216°N 8.29396°W
Casal de Senães	Silvares	Historic granite house in Silvares, likely built either in the 18th or 19th centuries.		1700s/1800s	41.44623°N 8.32652°W
Cineclub of Guimarães	Oliveira, São Paio e São Sebastião	Residential building at the João Franco Square that was converted into a cineclub in 1958.	Cineclub of Guimarães	1700s/1800s	41.44292°N 8.29493°W
Da Vinci Building (Unofficial name)	Toural; Oliveira, São Paio e São Sebastião	The building was built sometime after the fire that destroyed the north part of the Toural in 1869. It follows the Pombaline style.	Da Vinci Building	Sometime after 1869	41.44239°N 8.29589°W
Nossa Senhora da Conceição neighbourhood	Azurém	Popularly known as Jagunços, these 11 buildings were designed in 1970 by Carlos Carvalho Dias and built between 1973 and 1977. In 2008, an execution project was developed for the rehabilitation of the neighbourhood. Between October 2010 and April 2011, rehabilitation work was carried out on the exterior walls and roof of the buildings. In April 2011, the Guimarães City Council also proceeded with the decorative painting of the façades.	Part of the Nossa Senhora da Conceição neighbourhood	1973	41.44796°N 8.30162°W
Palace of São Cipriano	Tabuadelo e São Faustino	Noble baroque palace that follows the tower house (later expanded) model.	Palace of São Cipriano	1415	41.39699°N 8.28820°W
Pousada de Nossa Senhora da Oliveira	Oliveira, São Paio e São Sebastião	17th century building at the Oliveira Square that serves as an inn since 1979.	Pousada de Nossa Senhora da Oliveira	1600s	41.44319°N 8.29278°W
Pousada Tower	Azurém	The Pousada Tower or Pousada House is a 13th-century medieval tower house.	Pousada Tower	1200s	41.45908°N 8.30110°W
Quinta da Torre	Serzedo	Early 20th-century house with 16th-century chapel in Serzedo.	Quinta da Torre	1937	41.39764°N 8.22449°W
Quinta de Carvalho d’Arca	Polvoreira	With 13th century (or earlier) origins, the current estate is from the 17th century with later modifications.	Quinta de Carvalho d’Arca	1600s	41.41617°N 8.29968°W
Quinta de Gilde	São Torcato	The Quinta de Gilde, along with its private chapel, was built in 1772 by a fidalgo member of the Military Order of Christ. The estate also has a fountain from 1843.		1772	41.47052°N 8.26604°W
Quinta de Honra de Baixo	Creixomil	Quinta with 16th-century origins.	Quinta de Honra de Baixo	1500s	41.43459°N 8.30766°W
Quinta de Laços	Creixomil	U-shaped 17th century Quinta with a private chapel that dates from 1685.		1600s	41.43339°N 8.30966°W
Quinta do Sacoto	Guardizela	Quinta with roots dating back to the 12th century.		Sometime before 1800s	41.38749°N 8.35452°W
Santiago Palace	Oliveira, São Paio e São Sebastião	It was built at a corner of the Santiago Square following the euphoria caused by the liberalist victory at the Portuguese Civil War. It was a bank between 1872 and 1878 (where Alberto Sampaio worked) and in 1891 it was inaugurated as a seminar by King Carlos I, staying that way until 1893. In 1971 it was rented by the city council to install a temporary community health center. It was restored following the European Culture Capital of 2012 and inaugurated in 2014 as an expansion of the Alberto Sampaio Museum.	Santiago Palace	Mid 1800	41.44292°N 8.29346°W
Solar da Ponte	Briteiros São Salvador e Briteiros Santa Leocádia	Baroque style manor house built in the late 18th century where Martins Sarmento lived. It was described in the middle 1800s by Camilo Castelo Branco as “magnificent” while he temporarily stayed there. It was severely ruined by the 1980s and it was only restored in 2001, where, the following year, the museum of the Castro culture was installed.	Solar da Ponte	Late 1700s	41.52044°N 8.32530°W
Torre dos Almadas	Oliveira, São Paio e São Sebastião	The Torre dos Almadas has a large importance regarding the Nicolinas as, since 1968, serves as the headquarters of the AAELG and is the official venue where the annual Nicolinas Festivities Committee is officialized. Originally, the building formed part of a larger noble medieval residence which was later partially torn down and reduced in size following the expansion and densification of the city centre.	Torre dos Almadas	Before 1279	41.44238°N 8.29381°W
Urgezes House	Urgezes	House of wealthy origins in Urgezes.	Urgezes house	1886	41.42251°N 8.29817°W
Vila Flor Palace	Urgezes	Large noble baroque/rococo palace. In 1852, during her visit to Guimarães, Queen Maria II stayed at this palace. This visit would later result in the formal elevation of Guimarães to city status the following year.	Vila Flor Palace	Sometime between 1700 and 1747	41.43735°N 8.29505°W

=== Service buildings ===
List with notable buildings whose function is based on providing services to the people, such as Hotels, Banks, Theatres, Factories and others.

Service buildings in Guimarães
Name	Location	Description	Image	Construction	Coordinates
Abelheira Factory	Arosa e Castelões	Historic paper factory with origins dating back to 1755, built following the expansion and conversion of old mills along the Ave River in 1835. It was expanded in 1906 and converted into a spinning factory, then further enlarged in 1970 before being abandoned in 1997.		1835	41.56074°N 8.21010°W
Arquinho Factory	Urgezes	Historic factory built in 1913 and future house of the Aerospace Research Centre of the University of Minho.	Arquinho Factory	1913	41.43850°N 8.29749°W
Assembly of Guimarães	Costa	The Assembly of Guimarães is an association founded in 1962 whose statutory aims are to provide its members with cultural and recreational activities and promote the moral and material progress of the municipality. The institution's headquarters were designed by Fernando Távora and it was built between 1969 and 1972, following the modernist style.	Assembly of Guimarães	1969	41.44666°N 8.28441°W
Associação Familiar Vimaranense Building	Oliveira, São Paio e São Sebastião	Headquarters of the Associação Familiar Vimaranense, an association that provides various services such as medical consultations and funerals.	Associação Familiar Vimaranense Building	1933	41.44510°N 8.29179°W
Avenida Factory	Urgezes	The Fábrica da Avenida was part of the Companhia de Fiação e Tecidos de Guimarães, that also owned another factory in Campelos and a hydroelectric plant in Ronfe.	Avenida Factory	1897	41.43597°N 8.29219°W
Azurém Campus	Azurém	The Azurém Campus is one of the locations of the University of Minho, occupying a decent chunk of the freguesia of Azurém. Construction started in 1987 and it had several expansion since.	Azurém Campus	1987	41.45280°N 8.29001°W
Bercel Clothing Factory	Urgezes	Historic old clothing factory. Part of the roof collapsed on 17 March 2024.	Bercel Clothing Factory	Late 1800s or early 1900s	41.43926°N 8.29867°W
Cable Car of Guimarães	Costa	Popularly known as Teleférico, this gondola lift connects the city of Guimarães directly to the Penha Sanctuary.	Cable Car of Guimarães	1995	Bottom Terminus:41.4415165°N 8.2854137°W Top Terminus:41.4319286°N 8.2708554°W
Caixa Geral de Depósitos of Guimarães	Oliveira, São Paio e São Sebastião	Following the acquisition or expropriation and demolition of several buildings at the edge of the Toural, a new facility was constructed to house the city's Caixa Geral de Depósitos after it moved out of the Casa do Cabido (current Alberto Sampaio Museum). It was inaugurated on 24 June 1960, the same day as the Courthouse of Guimarães, by president Américo Tomás. Its facade was simplified and modernized between 1980 and 1982.	Caixa Geral de Depósitos of Guimarães	1960	41.44112°N 8.29566°W
Caldas das Taipas High School	Caldelas				
Castanheiro Factory	Urgezes	Historic textile factory, partially demolished for the construction of an apartment complex.	Castanheiro Factory	1883	41.43472°N 8.30062°W
Correios de Guimarães (Post Office of Guimarães)	Oliveira, São Paio e São Sebastião	Old post office building, built on top of its predecessor, inaugurated on 21 November 1980, it remained in operation until 2016.	Post Office Building of Guimarães	1980	41.44419°N 8.29445°W
Courthouse of Creixomil	Creixomil	Originally designed as a hotel, the building has been leased by the Guimarães city council since 2007 to house courthouse services. However, due to insufficient conditions, plans have been in place since 2019 to relocate the courthouse to a different building.	Courthouse of Creixomil	Sometime between 1990s and 2004	41.43757°N 8.31597°W
Courthouse of Guimarães	Oliveira, São Paio e São Sebastião	The Courthouse of Guimarães was built between May 1955 and 1960, being inaugurated by president Américo Tomás on 24 June of that year.	Courthouse of Guimarães	1955	41.44453°N 8.29065°W
Cruz de Pedra Factory	Creixomil	Founded in 1932, the Cruz de Pedra Factory was once part of the large textile industry in the city at the time. It now serves as a professional education center. It follows a mixture of Art Deco and Modernist architecture.	Cruz de Pedra Factory	1932	41.43744°N 8.30267°W
Cruz de Pedra Pottery Ovens	Creixomil	This is the only remaining set of historic pottery ovens in the city. By 1981, they had ceased functioning and were left abandoned for over four decades until 2023, when the building was restored and converted into a small museum.	Cruz de Pedra Pottery Ovens	Before 1884	41.43888°N 8.30222°W
Francisco de Holanda High School	Oliveira, São Paio e São Sebastião	The Francisco de Holanda High School was established as the Industrial School of Guimarães on 3 December 1884 and officially inaugurated on 1 February 1886 at its current site. During World War I, its premises served as the barracks for the 20th Infantry Regiment in 1915. The original building was demolished, except for its workshops, and the current structure was built between 1956 and 1958, inaugurated the following year. The school was later expanded in 1961 and renovated in 2013.	Francisco de Holanda High School	1958	41.44449°N 8.29688°W
Francisco Santos Guimarães School	Urgezes	Named in honor of the builder's brother, this primary school was planned in 1930 and concluded in 1931, being later expanded in 1981 to accommodate the growing population of Urgezes.	Francisco Santos Guimarães School	1931	41.42690°N 8.29878°W
Garagem Avenida	Urgezes	Situated adjacent to the Jordão Theatre, the Garagem Avenida predates the theatre's construction and stood as the primary car repair shop in Guimarães throughout the 20th century. It is a clear example of Art Deco in the city.	Garagem Avenida	Before 1937	41.43916°N 8.29514°W
Gil Vicente Theatre	Oliveira, São Paio e São Sebastião	The Gil Vicente Theatre, now referred to as Associação de Socorros Mútuos Artística Vimaranense, is a venetian gothic revival building built sometime between 1888 and 1908 by the Venecian architect Nicola Bigaglia, that is historically connected to the artistic side of the city.	Gil Vicente Theatre	Sometime between 1888 and 1908	41.44416°N 8.29605°W
Guimarães Police Station	Azurém	Designed in 1988 by Fernando Távora and completed in 1993 on the former site of the entrance gate to the Casa da Espinhosa, the Guimarães Police Station serves as the headquarters of the PSP in the city.	Guimarães Police Station	1993	41.44806°N 8.29967°W
Guimarães Shopping	Creixomil	The Guimarães Shopping is the main shopping mall of Guimarães, having a dining area with multiple fast food venues, clothing and hardware stores, a Continente, a Fnac and three stories of parking.	Guimarães Shopping	1995	41.44047°N 8.30317°W
Hotel D. João IV	Urgezes	Hotel located in front of the old Guimarães Railway Station, named after the avenue on which it stands, itself dedicated to the monarch João IV. It was built between 1994 and 1995 and is an example of Postmodern architecture.	Hotel D. João IV	1994	41.43577°N 8.29519°W
Hotel da Penha	Costa	Hotel located at the summit of the Penha Mount, next to the sanctuary of the same name, inaugurated in 1894 and remodeled in 1971.	Hotel da Penha	1894	41.43258°N 8.26934°W
Hotel das Termas	Caldelas	Beaux-Arts style hotel built between 1915 and 1923, and designed by architect Eduardo da Costa Alves Júnior, due to the flow of tourist visiting thermal baths of the town. Its interior was completely remodeled in the 1990s.	Hotel das Termas	1915	41.488292°N 8.342961°W
Hotel Fundador	Urgezes	Hotel and tallest building in Guimarães.	Hotel Fundador	1971	41.4361°N 8.2961°W
Hotel Guimarães	Urgezes	Hotel next to the Fundador Hotel, in Urgezes.	Hotel Guimarães	Before 2002	41.43614°N 8.29702°W
Hotel Ibis Guimarães	Creixomil	Ibis hotel next to the Guimarães Shopping on the site of the old municipal slaughterhouse.	Hotel Ibis Guimarães	Sometime between 2000 and 2004	41.44157°N 8.30231°W
Hotel Mestre de Avis	Oliveira, São Paio e São Sebastião	The building known as "O Casarão" (The Big House), originally owned by the family of writer Raul Brandão, was, in 1995, restored and repurposed into a hotel after years of abandonment.	Hotel Mestre de Avis	Late 1800s or early 1900s	41.44194°N 8.29771°W
Hotel Santa Luzia	Azurém				41.44636°N 8.29681°W
Hotel Toural	Oliveira, São Paio e São Sebastião	The Hotel Toural, described as having been built at the end of the 18th century, at the same time as that entire side of the square (named the “Pombaline Front”), was erected sometime between 1793 and 1799, after the demolition of the medieval walls east of the Toural.	Hotel Toural	Sometime between 1793 and 1799	41.44205°N 8.29529°W
Jordão Theatre	Urgezes	Art Deco theatre built in 1938, by Júlio de Brito, due to the lack of proper entertainment structures in the city.	Jordão Theatre	1938	41.43888°N 8.29518°W
José de Guimarães International Art Center	Oliveira, São Paio e São Sebastião				41.44273°N 8.29752°W
Junta de Freguesia of Costa	Costa				41.445107°N 8.281262°W
Junta de Freguesia of Creixomil	Creixomil	Typical granite building from the early 20th century deeply restored in 2012 that serves as the Junta de Freguesia of Creixomil.	Junta de Freguesia of Creixomil	Early 1900s	41.43824°N 8.31280°W
Junta de Freguesia of Fermentões	Fermentões		Junta de Freguesia of Fermentões		41.45657°N 8.31565°W
Junta de Freguesia of Tabuadelo	Tabuadelo		Junta de Freguesia of Tabuadelo		41.40052°N 8.29009°W
Junta de Freguesia of Urgezes	Urgezes	Modernist building that serves as the Junta de Freguesia of Urgezes. It suffered a fire in 2023 that partially destroyed the building.	Junta de Freguesia of Urgezes	1980s/1990s	41.42636°N 8.29546°W
Laboratório da Paisagem	Creixomil	The Laboratório da Paisagem was established to oversee all natural‐environment initiatives and events within the municipality of Guimarães. Following extensive restoration and rehabilitation work on the Pisca Factory between 2010 and 2012, the facility was officially inaugurated on 24 June 2014, in a joint ceremony hosted by the city's Municipal Chamber, the University of Minho and the University of Trás-os-Montes and Alto Douro.	Laboratório da Paisagem	Early 1900s	41.43893°N 8.32066°W
Madroa Factory	Urgezes	Historic textile factory.		Early-mid 1900s	41.43937°N 8.29883°W
Martins Sarmento High School	Oliveira, São Paio e São Sebastião	Founded in 1890 as a seminar and changed into a high school in 1911, it was renamed from Guimarães High School to Martins Sarmento High School in 1917 in honor of the renowned archaeologist and writer Martins Sarmento. The current building was designed by architect Luís Benavente and construction began in 1959 and was completed by 1961. This new location was inaugurated in 1962, replacing the Santa Clara Convent, later converted to the Câmara Municipal of Guimarães. The school was modernized and expanded between October 2010 and 2012.	Martins Sarmento High School	1961	41.44522°N 8.28802°W
Martins Sarmento Society Building	Oliveira, São Paio e São Sebastião	Museum and headquarters of the Martins Sarmento Society. It was constructed in two phases, the first between 1901 and 1908 and the second between 1934 and 1967. It was designed by architect Marques das Silva.	Martins Sarmento Society Building	1901	41.44272°N 8.29664°W
Moinho do Buraco Factory	Selho	Historic textile factory built in 1890 expanded in 1905 and 1912. It filled for bankruptcy in 1990 and a failed attempt at becoming a national landmark soon later led to its abandonment.		1890	41.42223°N 8.35253°W
Motelo Primary School (Agriculture Museum)	Fermentões	Built in the 1940s, the Motelo Primary School, due to its background and association with local agriculture mainly in the 1970s, was converted into an agricultural museum in September 1983 after it ceased its educational role earlier that decade.	Motelo Primary School	1940s	41.458562°N 8.312641°W
Municipal Market of Guimarães (new)	Creixomil				41.43950°N 8.30005°W
Municipal Market of Guimarães (old)	Oliveira, São Paio e São Sebastião	This Art Deco market was erected atop a former site of traditional trade fairs, the so-called "Market Square", as part of an effort to modernize the area. Designed by architect Marques da Silva in February 1927, construction commenced in 1930 and unfolded in several stages. The final phase, completed in 1950, was overseen by Marques da Silva's daughter following his death in 1947. Between 2010 and 2012 works were conducted to restore and adapt the building into a space dedicated to artistic and cultural activities, but it is still partially used for commercial purposes.	Old Municipal Market of Guimarães	1930	41.44324°N 8.29684°W
National Tuberculosis Assistance Dispensary	Azurém	Dispensary built in 1952 to fight and control the spread of tuberculosis in the city.	National Tuberculosis Assistance Dispensary	1952	41.44861°N 8.29089°W
Railway station (old)	Urgezes	Train station that served the city of Guimarães between 1884 and 2004.	Old Guimarães railway station	1884	41.43547°N 8.29532°W
Railway station (new)	Urgezes	New train station that serves Guimarães since 2004.	New Guimarães Railway Station	2004	41.43527°N 8.29402°W
Ramada Tanning Factory	Oliveira, São Paio e São Sebastião	The Ramada Tanning Factory (Fábrica de Curtumes da Ramada) was part of an industrial textile complex that functioned between the 1930s and 2005, although the building was built before this, in the early 1800s. In 1955 it suffered a massive fire that destroyed the majority of the complex, being rebuilt soon after. Following its closure in 2005, it underwent restoration and was subsequently transformed into a bar and into facilities for the University of Minho's Design Institute.	Ramada Tanning Factory	Early 1800s	41.44048°N 8.29089°W
Roldes Factory	Fermentões	Constructed along the Selho River in 1923, this historic textile tanning factory was built with significant assistance from Alberto Menezes Macedo, the son of the Count of Margaride. It was renamed to Caneiros Factory by him, a change that was reversed in 1932. Expanded in 1931, the facility remained in operation until 2024. Its closure marked the end of Guimarães's century-long mass tanning industry tradition, as the Roldes Factory was the last venue still practicing the craft.	Roldes Factory	1923	41.45804°N 8.31036°W
Santa Casa da Misericórdia of Guimarães	Oliveira, São Paio e São Sebastião	Former hospital and current Santa Casa da Misericórdia of Guimarães.	Santa Casa da Misericórdia of Guimarães Building	1606	41.44238°N 8.29494°W
Santos Simões School	Mesão Frio				
São Mamede Theatre	Oliveira, São Paio e São Sebastião				
Vermil Factory	Airão Santa Maria, Airão São João e Vermil	Historic factory in Vermil built in 1922.		1922	41.4408744°N 8.3918263°W
Vila Flor Cultural Centre	Urgezes	After the City Council acquired the Vila Flor Palace and surrounding premises in 1976 to establish an extension of the Minho University, a new set of buildings were built next to the palace to host cultural events in 2005, naming them Vila Flor Cultural Centre.	Vila Flor Cultural Centre	2005	41.43699°N 8.29439°W

=== Religious ===
Guimarães is deeply involved in Catholic culture, after more than a millennium of its influence in the region. This means that there is a wide variety of religious buildings from many different centuries throughout the municipality.

Religious places in Guimarães
Name	Location	Description	Image	Construction	Coordinate's
Church of Our Lady of the Olive Tree (Igreja de Nossa Senhora da Oliveira)	Oliveira, São Paio e São Sebastião	Founded as a double monastery in about 949 by Countess Mumadona Dias, it was later donated to the Catholic Church by King Ramiro II. Around 1139, the monastery was turned into a collegiate church, the Colegiada de Nossa Senhora da Oliveira. The collegiate church was shut down in 1911, but reopened in 1967.		949	41.44295°N 8.29263°W
Church of São Miguel do Castelo	Oliveira, São Paio e São Sebastião	Romanesque medieval church where Afonso Henriques is said to have been baptized.	Church of São Miguel do Castelo	Before 1216	41.44726°N 8.29102°W
Penha Sanctuary	Costa	Church at the summit of the Penha Mountain built over a series of phases starting in 1931 and ending fully in 1949, suffering some minor changes later as well.	Penha Sanctuary	1931	41.43179°N 8.26984°W
Saint Peter's Basilica	Oliveira, São Paio e São Sebastião	The St. Peter's Basilica is a Catholic church built following the neoclassical style. Located at the Toural, it receive the title of minor basilica by Pope Benedict XIV in 1751.		1785	41.44169°N 8.29594°W
Santos Passos Church	Oliveira, São Paio e São Sebastião	The Santos Passos Church is an 18th-century Portuguese baroque church located at the Campo da Feira.		1769	41.44090°N 8.28971°W

=== Sport ===
Sports in Guimarães are largely influenced by Vitória S.C., with Moreirense F.C. also holding a significant position. Below is a compilation of notable sports-related venues and locations in Guimarães.

Sport-related places in Guimarães
Name	Location	Description	Image	Coordinate's
Estádio D. Afonso Henriques	Oliveira, São Paio e São Sebastião	Stadium of Vitória S.C., the main football club of the city, was built in 1965 and renovated in 2003 for Euro 2004. It regularly hosts international matches.	Afonso Henriques Stadium	41.44586°N 8.30095°W
Guimarães Sports Centre	Spread across the Municipality	Comprises many facilities distributed throughout Guimarāes, providing spaces for sports practice and hosting large-scale events.	Multiusos de Guimarães, part of the Guimarães Sports Centre	Multiple
Multiusos de Guimarães	Creixomil	Multi-purpose arena, used for hosting fairs, exhibitions, congresses, concerts and sporting events.	Multiusos de Guimarães	41.43449°N 8.30514°W
Parque Joaquim de Almeida Freitas	Moreira de Cónegos	Stadium of Moreirense Football Club.	Parque Joaquim de Almeida Freitas	41.37807°N 8.35458°W

=== Demolished buildings ===
Notable buildings in Guimarães that were demolished.

Demolished landmarks in Guimarães
Name	Location	Description	Image	Demolition	Coordinates
Afonso Henriques Theatre	Oliveira, São Paio e São Sebastião	Former theatre at the Campo da Feira, inaugurated in 1855 and demolished sometime between 1943 and 1949.	Afonso Henriques Theatre	Sometime between 1943 and 1949	41°26′30.98″N 8°17′30.37″W
Casa dos Cães de Pedra	Urgezes	This noble house, built sometime between 1498 and 1750, was demolished in 2020 as part of an urban renewal plan for part of Guimarães' old industrial district. Its name, "Casa dos Cães de Pedra" (House of the Stone Dogs), refers to the stone dogs that once adorned the top of its still preserved granite entrance gate, although they disappeared sometime prior to 2009.	Gate of the now demolished Casa dos Cães de Pedra	2020	41°26′16″N 8°17′56″W
Minhoto Factory	Urgezes	Textile factory built sometime before 1902 and demolished in 2020.	Minhoto Factory	2020	41.43641°N 8.29792°W
Minotes Palace	Oliveira, São Paio e São Sebastião				41.44407°N 8.29449°W
Municipal Slaughterhouse	Creixomil	Constructed in 1887, the building was expanded in 1904 with the addition of a public wash house on its premises. It was demolished in 1994 after failing to be incorporated into the Guimarães Shopping Complex as a hotel, and its front façade, still intended for integration into a future project on the now vacant lot, was destroyed during the construction of Hotel Ibis Guimarães sometime between 2000 and 2004, although the entrance still features a replica of one of its original windows. The wash house was preserved and relocated up the street.	Replica window of the old Municipal Slaughterhouse at the Hotel Ibis Guimarães	1994	41.4416115°N 8.3024112°W
São Paio Church	Oliveira, São Paio e São Sebastião	It served as the parish church of São Paio until its demolition in 1914. This role now belongs to the São Domingos Church.	São Paio Church	1914	41.44175°N 8.29468°W
São Sebastião Church	Oliveira, São Paio e São Sebastião	It served as the parish church of São Sebastião. Its bell tower can still be found at the Creixomil Parish Church.	São Sebastião Church	1892	41.44117°N 8.29507°W
Tojeira Theatre	Oliveira, São Paio e São Sebastião	It was established in 1796 on a building built sometime between that and 1750. It was demolished in 1940, no longer serving as a theatre as late as 1841, following the demolition of the houses in the area surrounding the Castle of Guimarães and the Palace of the Dukes of Braganza.	Tojeira Theatre	1940	41.44705°N 8.29186°W

== Structures ==
=== Bridges ===
Guimarães has many bridges, spanning from the Roman era to modern times, that help the crossing through the Ave River and its tributaries.

Bridges in Guimarães
Name	Location	Description	Image	Construction	Coordinates
Arco de Pombeiro Bridge	Serzedo e Calvos	Gallaeci-Roman bridge that used to connect Guimarães to Felgueiras and Amarante.	Arco de Pombeiro Bridge	Sometime between 100 BC and 400 AD	41.39462°N 8.23040°W
Arco de São João Bridge	Serzedo e Calvos	Medieval bridge that used to connect Guimarães to Fafe and Felgueiras.		Between 400s and the 1400s	41.40877°N 8.22072°W
Donim Bridge	Briteiros Santo Estêvão e Donim	Medieval bridge that used to connect Guimarães and Póvoa de Lanhoso, earliest known mention from 1527.	Donim Bridge	Before 1527	41.52477°N 8.29445°W
Negrelos Bridge	Lordelo	1st/2nd century AD Gallaeci-Roman bridge that connects Guimarães to Santo Tirso. It suffered extensive interventions in the 14th/15th century and then again in 1853. After partially collapsing on 11 March 2005, it was restored and reinforced the following year.		Sometime between 1 and 200 AD	41.36646°N 8.35498°W
Pisca Bridge	Creixomil	Also called Senhora da Luz Bridge, it has Roman origins, being rebuilt in the Medieval period and was up ever since.	Pisca Bridge	Sometime between 400 and 1279	41.43902°N 8.32142°W
Roldes Bridge	Fermentões	Also called Caneiros Bridge or even Nossa Senhora da Conceição Bridge, due to its proximity to the old Chapel of Nossa Senhora da Conceição, this medieval bridge crosses the Selho River.	Roldes Bridge	Sometime between the 400s and 1400s	41.45650°N 8.31058°W
Selho Bridge	Selho São Lourenço e Gominhães	Granite bridge built between the 5th and 15th centuries, rebuilt in the 1800s.	Selho Bridge	Sometime between the 400s and the 1400s	41.46461°N 8.28105°W
Serves Bridge	Gondar	12th century medieval bridge. It partially collapsed on 14 April 1944, being completely restored and reinforced in 1950.	Serves Bridge	1185	41.42041°N 8.37734°W
Soeiro Bridge	Gondar and Serzedelo	The Soeiro Bridge is a medieval stone bridge that connects Gondar and Serzedelo. In December 2020, it was in a state of severe disrepair and transit was halted due to the risk of collapse despite some announcements of its restoration. Despite works starting in 2023, they were extended to 2024 and the inauguration of the reinforced structure only came on 31 March 2025, costing over 400 thousand euros.	Soeiro Bridge	Between 400s and the 1400s	41.41110°N 8.37362°W
Taipas Bridge	Caldelas	Also called Ave River Bridge, it was originally built to connect the Thermae at Caldas das Taipas to Braga. It was rebuilt in 1926.	Taipas Bridge	Sometime between 98 and 200 AD	41.48192°N 8.34485°W
Turio Bridge	Arosa e Castelões	Medieval secondary stone bridge that crosses the Pequeno River, a tributary of the Ave River.		Between 400s and the 1400s	41.54619°N 8.20973°W

=== Monuments ===
Guimarães has a vast amount of monuments, including sculptures, statues, calvaries and abstract art.

Monuments in Guimarães
Name	Location	Description	Image	Inauguration	Coordinates
Ara de Trajano	Caldelas	Large granite boulder with engraved inscriptions. One inscription, dating from 104 AD, commemorates Trajan, while another from 1818 compliments the therapeutic effects of the town's thermal waters on skin diseases. It was declared a National Monument in 1910.	Ara de Trajano	104 AD	41.48702°N 8.34402°W
Árvore da Paz (Peace Tree)	Azurém	Sculpture by Aureliano Aguiar, in the Padre Luís Gonzaga Fonseca Square, near the Afonso Henriques Stadium.	Peace Tree monument	2003?	41.44822°N 8.30072°W
Guimarães de Duas Caras (Guimarães of the two faces)	Oliveira, São Paio e São Sebastião	Statue depicting a soldier with two faces. The two faces depict the two lines of defense following the Portuguese conquest of Ceuta. It is located on top of the Paços do Concelho de Guimarães.	Guimarães de Duas Caras sculpture	1877?	41.44315°N 8.29301°W
Monumento ao Nicolino	Oliveira, São Paio e São Sebastião	Monument made to honor those who participate at the Nicolinas.	Monumento ao Nicolino	2008	41.44066°N 8.29003°W
Monument to Gago Coutinho and Sacadura Cabral	Costa	Monument carved on the side of a boulder (named Boulder of the Aviators) at the summit of the Penha Mountain dedicated to Gago Coutinho and Sacadura Cabral for their crossing of the South Atlantic.	Monument to Gago Coutinho and Sacadura Cabral	1927	41.43222°N 8.26883°W
Monument to João Franco	Oliveira, São Paio e São Sebastião	Monument dedicated to former Prime Minister of Portugal João Franco, located in the Misericórdia Square, also known as João Franco Square. On 12 April 1932, the city council approved the construction of a monument to honour Franco’s life and public service. Construction began in 1933, and the monument was inaugurated on 17 June 1934. Originally erected at the centre of the square, it was later relocated to its northeastern side, where it now faces west.	Monument to João Franco	1933	41.44310°N 8.29433°W
Monument to the 500 years of Portuguese theatre	Oliveira, São Paio e São Sebastião	In Portuguese, Monumento aos 500 anos do Teatro Português, is a monument by Irene Vilar dedicated to Gil Vicente and the five centuries of Portuguese theatre, located at the São Dâmaso Boulevard.	Monument to the 500 years of Portuguese theatre	2003	41.44216°N 8.29218°W
O Devorador de Automóveis (The Devourer of Cars)	Azurém	Sculpture of a monster eating a car, at the Campus of Azurém, designed by José de Guimarães.	O Devorador de Automóveis monument	1981 or 1991	
Padrão de D. João I	Creixomil	Monument commissioned by King John I (later replaced in the 1500s by the current structure) to honor of the Portuguese conquest of Ceuta or the Portuguese victory at the Battle of Aljubarrota.	Padrão de D. João I	Around 1517	41.44149°N 8.30103°W
Ponte Obelisk	Ponte	The Ponte Obelisk is a granite monument made by sculptor Dinis Ribeiro with Phoenician inscriptions.	Ponte Obelisk	2017	41.47652°N 8.34170°W
Rapariguinha (Little Girl)	Oliveira, São Paio e São Sebastião	Statue by António de Azevedo near the Toural Square.	Rapariguinha fountain monument	1934?	41.44106°N 8.29369°W
Statue of Afonso Henriques by João Cutileiro	Oliveira, São Paio e São Sebastião	Statue depicting king Afonso I of Portugal, designed by João Cutileiro, at the João Franco Square.	Statue of Afonso Henriques by João Cutileiro	2001	41.44247°N 8.29494°W
Statue of Afonso Henriques by Soares dos Reis	Oliveira, São Paio e São Sebastião	Statue depicting king Afonso I of Portugal, designed by Soares dos Reis, located besides the Paço dos Duques.	Statue of Afonso Henriques by António Soares dos Reis	1887	41.44690°N 8.29173°W
Statue of Afonso Henriques next to the Afonso Henriques Stadium	Oliveira, São Paio e São Sebastião	Statue of Afonso I of Portugal, besides the Estádio D. Afonso Henriques, one of the symbols of Vitória S.C.	Statue of Afonso Henriques next to the Afonso Henriques Stadium	2016	41.44515°N 8.30194°W
Statue of Mumadona Dias	Oliveira, São Paio e São Sebastião	Statue of Mumadona Dias, in front of the Courthouse of Guimarães.	Mumadona Dias statue	1960	41.44490°N 8.29081°W
Statue of Pius IX	Costa	Marble statue depicting pope Pius IX with the apostolic constitution of Ineffabilis Deus, at the Penha Sanctuary. Construction began on 18 June 1882, with the laying of the foundation stone, and it was inaugurated eleven years later, on 8 September 1893.	Pius IX statue	1882	41.42975°N 8.26853°W
World Heritage Monument	Oliveira, São Paio e São Sebastião	Monument of the World Heritage emblem, celebrating the status given to the Historic Centre of Guimarães in 2001, located at the Campo da Feira.	World Heritage Monument	2020	41.44246°N 8.29192°W

== See also ==
- Guimarães
- Historic Centre of Guimarães
- History of Portugal
- List of religious buildings in Guimarães
- List of national monuments of Portugal

== Bibliography ==
- Centro Histórico de Guimarães e Zona de Couros [Historic Centre of Guimarães and Couros Zone] (in Portuguese and English). Vol. I. Guimarães: Câmara Municipal de Guimarães, Departamento do Desenvolvimento do Território and Divisão do Património Mundial e Bens Classificados. September 2024. ISBN 978-972-8050-80-1.
- Guimarães: O Espírito do Lugar, Arquitectura e Espaços Verdes [Guimarães: The Spirit of the Place, Architecture and Green Spaces] (in Portuguese). Villas & Golfe.
- Moraes, Maria Adelaide Pereira de (December 2001). Velhas Casas de Guimarães [Old Houses of Guimarães] (in European Portuguese). Vol. II. Porto: Centro de Estudos de Geneologia, Heráldica e História da Família da Universidade Moderna do Porto. ISBN 972-8682-11-5.
