= Zé Amaro =

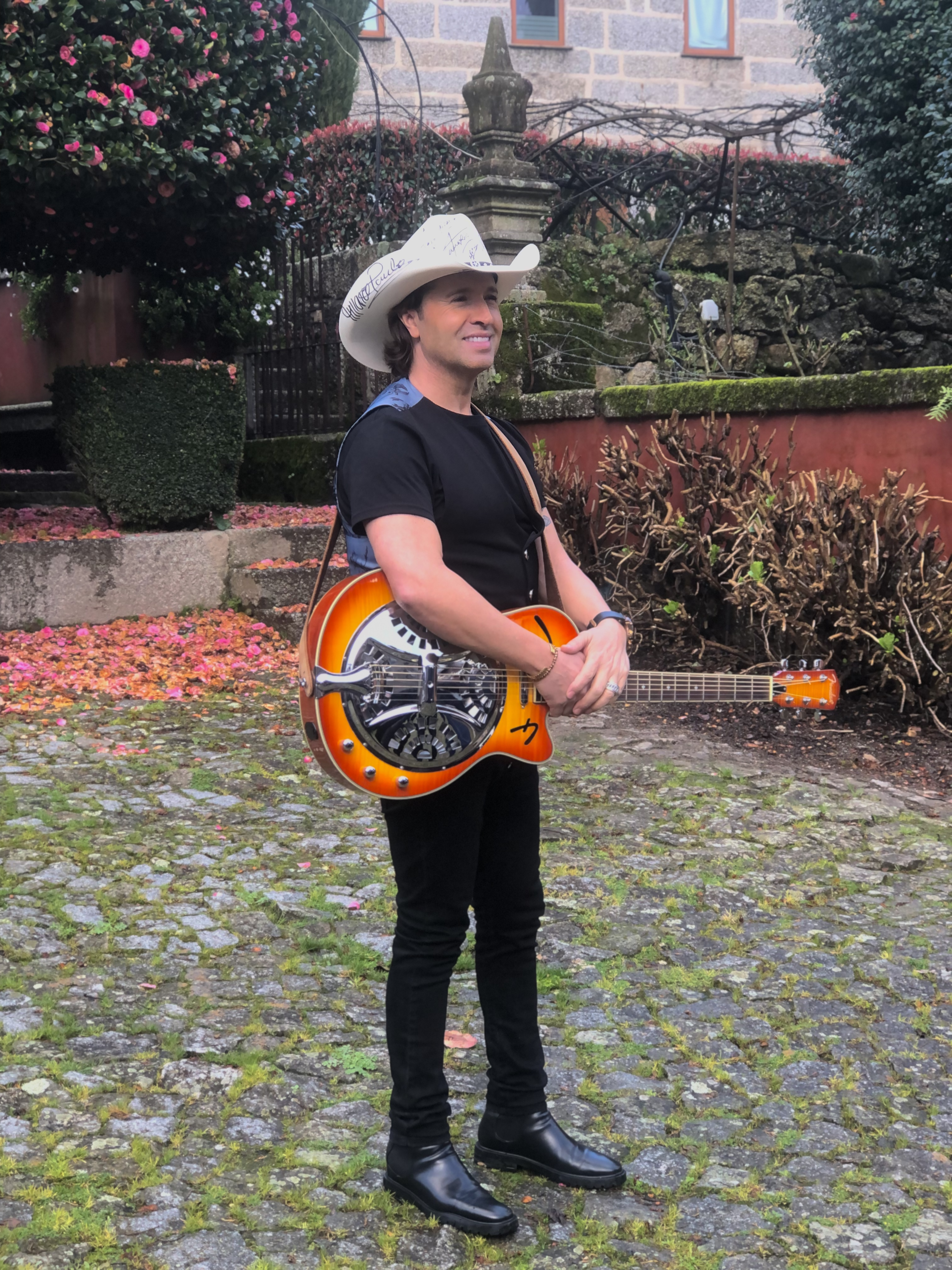
- Amaro at the Casa de Margaride in Guimarães, 2024

Background information
- Born: José Amaro; 1 July 1973 (age 52); Guimarães, Portugal
- Years active: 2007-present
- Website: www.zeamaro.pt

José Amaro (born in Guimarães, 1 July 1973), known mostly by his artistic name, Zé Amaro, is a Portuguese singer. The town of Ponte in Guimarães named him a "noble ambassador" for his "work and support in socially relevant areas for the community, promoting the common good".

== Career ==
Zé Amaro is called the "Portuguese Cowboy" and is known for his country music style, and his interpretation of romantic, traditional and more popular songs.

== Albums ==
Album list:

- April 2007 - O Coração da Gente Chora
- April 2008 - Nortenho de Coração
- May 2009 - Amor de Primavera
- May 2011 - Amor de Verão (Platinum Disc)
- 2012 - Cowboy, Cantor e Violeiro (CD and DVD recorded live)
- June 2013 - Obrigado Fãs
- June 2014 - Ao vivo no seu melhor (Recorded live)
- 2015 - Cowboy Apaixonado
- 2016 - O Meu Caminho (Both in studio and live)
- 2017 - 10 Anos ao Vivo (Recorded live at the Multiusos de Guimarães)
- 2018 - A Minha Estrada
- 2019 - Homem de Sonhos
- 2021 - Ao Vivo no Super Bock Arena
- 2023 - Nó que não desata
- 2024 - Ao Vivo no Coliseu de Lisboa - Só Originais (Recorded live)

As of January 2025, he has 15 albums to his name, all of which have won gold and platinum medals, a total of 10 gold and 5 platinum records as well as 2 gold DVDs.

To celebrate his 15th career anniversary, Zé Amaro gave concerts at the Coliseu do Porto and Lisboa.
