= Padrão do Salado =

14th century monument in Guimarães, Portugal

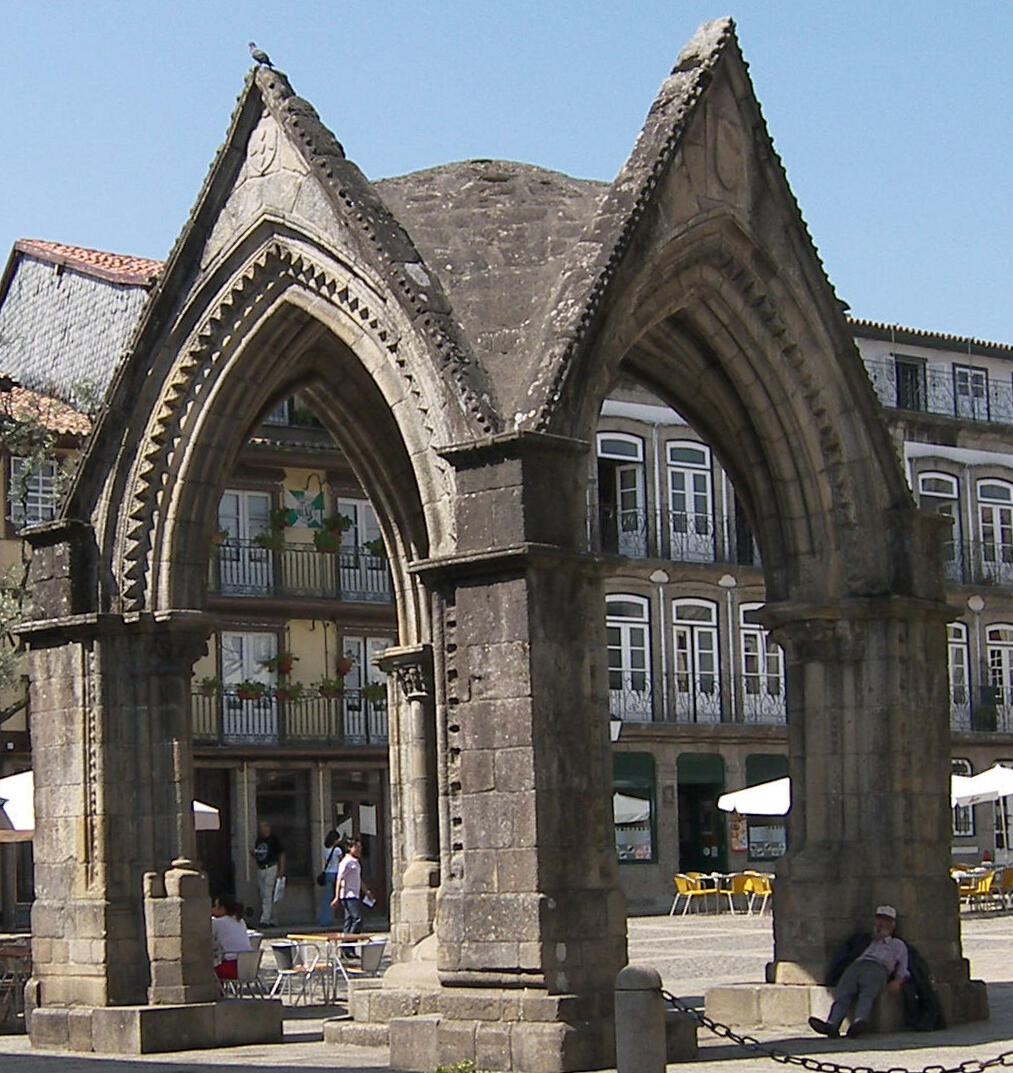
- The Padrão do Salado in 2007.
- Interactive map of Padrão do Salado
- Coordinates: 41.44284°N 8.29279°W
- Type: National monument
- Material: Granite and limestone
- Completion date: 1340
- Dedicated to: Victory of Portugal at the Battle of Río Salado

UNESCO World Heritage Site
- Part of: Historic Centre of Guimarães
- Criteria: Cultural: ii, iii, iv
- Reference: 1031
- Inscription: 2001 (25th Session)

The Padrão Commemorativo da Batalha do Salado, commonly referred to as just Padrão do Salado, is a 14th-century gothic monument located in the freguesia of Oliveira, São Paio e São Sebastião, inside the Historic Center of Guimarães area, in Portugal.

Located in front of the Church of Nossa Senhora da Oliveira, the Padrão do Salado has been classified as a National Monument since 1910.

== History ==
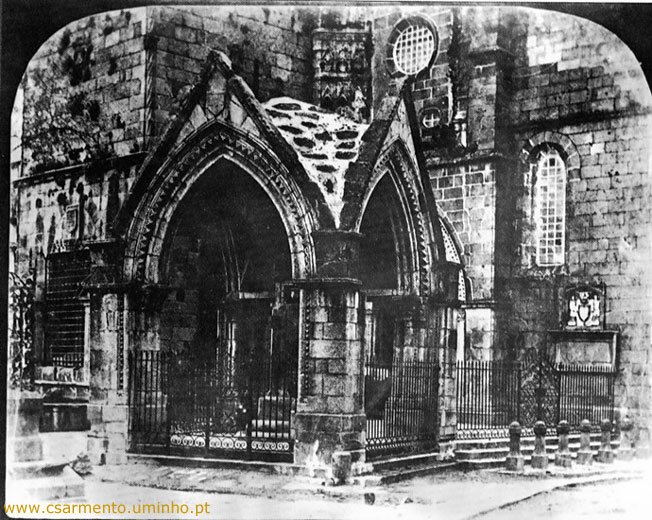
Historic photograph of the Padrão do Salado in the 1850s.

It was erected in 1340 at the initiative of Afonso IV of Portugal to commemorate the victory in the Battle of Río Salado that took place the same year. The Portuguese sovereign had participated in this battle in support of his son-in-law, Afonso XI of Castile, helping him defend against a Muslim invasion. The limestone Normand cross, located in the middle of the monument, originally plated with gold, was gifted by local merchant Pedro Esteves in 1342. It was sealed with iron fencing until the yearly 20th century.

== Description ==
Open quadrangular-plan porch made up of four carved broken arches resting on columns with carved capitals, topped by the Royal coat of arms. The arches, surmounted by a gable, limit a granite vaulted roof. It houses a cross resting on a circular socle with two steps. The polychrome cross depicts Christ Crucified on one side and the Virgin Mother under a baldachin on the other. On a lower level on the shaft of the cross: 4 sculptures representing Vincent of Saragossa, Philip the Apostle, Saint Torcato and the Guardian Angel.

== See also ==
- Battle of Río Salado
- List of national monuments of Portugal
- List of buildings in Guimarães
- Padrão de D. João I
