= Santa Maria Street =

Street in Guimarães, Portugal

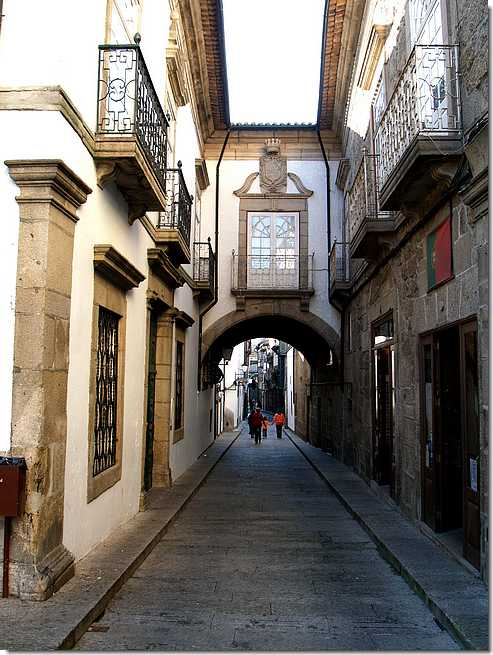
- Casa do Arco (House of the Arch), located at the entrance to the Santiago Square, in 2006

- Location within Portugal
- Native name: Rua de Santa Maria (Portuguese)
- Former name: Rua da Infesta (upper section)
- Part of: Historic Centre of Guimarães
- Type: Medieval street
- Location: Oliveira, São Paio e São Sebastião, Guimarães, Portugal
- Coordinates: 41.444069°N 8.292782°W

Construction
- Completion: Before the 12th century

Other
- Status: Preserved
- Website: www.cm-guimaraes.pt/rua-de-santa-maria

The Santa Maria Street (Portuguese: Rua de Santa Maria) is a street of medieval origin in the historic centre of Guimarães, being for many centuries the most important street in Guimarães and home to some of its elite.

The street currently connects the Oliveira and the Santiago Square to the Carmo Square. It is already referred to by the name “Rua de Santa Maria” in documents that date to the 12th century, although its upper section was given the old name of Rua da Infesta (Infesta Street).

Along its route there are various notable architectural and cultural testimonies of the past, such as “casas” (houses in English):

- Convent of Santa Clara, a 16th-century boroque style convent now used as the câmara municipal of Guimarães.
- Raul Brandão Library, built in 1834, is dedicated to the renowned figure Raul Brandão and currently serves as the municipal library of Guimarães.
- Casa do Arco, it was built in the end of the 15th century, Manuel I once slept here after coming from a trip to Santiago de Compostela. Other historical figures like king Miguel I and the painter Auguste Roquemont also spent some nights here with the last one living here in the 1830s.
- Casa do Leite, late 1800s noble house.
- Casa do Morgado da Índia, 16th century house prized for its conservation status.
- Casa dos Braganças de Cete, the house where Mário de Vasconcelos Cardoso was born.
- Casa dos Peixotos, built in the 1700s, it was a noble family's house.
- Casa dos Valadares de Carvalho, one of the oldest buildings that are still standing on that street, it was built in the 15th century, it was a noble family's house.
- Casa da Senhora Aninhas, the house where the “mother and protector of the students of Guimarães” lived, and one of the 5 locations where the Pregão is declaimed.
