= Casa do Costeado =

Historic house in Guimarães, Portugal

Costeado House
- Casa do Costeado
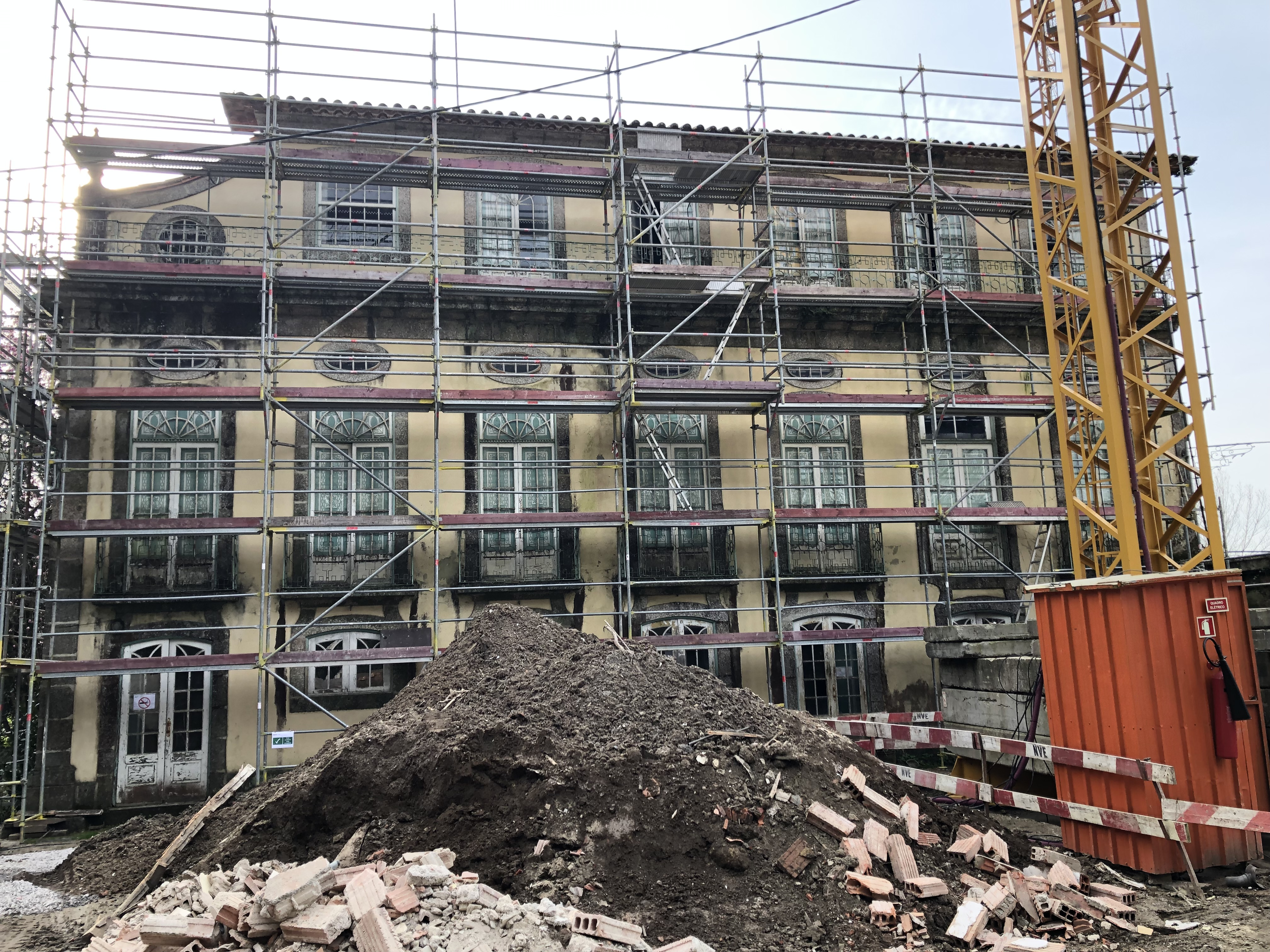
- Costeado House in February 2024, during the restoration and rehabilitation works.
- Interactive map of the Costeado House area
- Former names: Casa do Costiago (Costiago House)

General information
- Status: Inserted inside the GHC
- Architectural style: Portuguese baroque
- Classification: Historic landmark
- Location: Creixomil, Guimarães, Portugal
- Coordinates: 41.43790°N 8.30360°W
- Construction started: Late 1700s
- Completed: 1800s
- Renovated: 2023–present
- Owner: Câmara Municipal of Guimarães

Technical details
- Floor count: 4

The Costeado House (Portuguese: Casa do Costeado) is a noble and historic house in Guimarães, Portugal.

== Description ==
The Costeado House is currently made up of two buildings which, although connected, are visibly different. One is a long two-storey building dating from the 16th century and the other is a tall three-storey building begun at the end of the 18th century and completed in the 19th century.

The area belonging to the house, encompassing approximately 4.5 hectares around it, includes a granite entrance gate, a cobblestone path from it to the house, extensive gardens, patches of forest and farmland, small ruins of a couple small houses and espigueiros and a small creek. The property is bordered by roads and is just 100 meters from the Guimarães Shopping.

The top of the gate and the house's window grilles are made of wrought iron.

== History ==
=== 17th century ===
The house is first mentioned with the name "Costiago" on 22 November 1644. The mention appears on a notebook stating that Lucrécia Camela, "owner of the casal of the Costiago, in the parish of Creixomil", wrote a letter of attorney to a certain Glz Galham, resident of Vila do Conde. She died exactly a month later.

A different document later mentions that Inês Caldeirão Villassus was born at the "Costiago" on 30 August 1658, and her father, Gonçalo Francisco, bought the residence in 1672, previously owned by Alexandre do Vale Peixoto.

=== 19th and 20th century ===
On the night of 4–5 May 1841, during a spectacle at the Casa do Costeado, a 15-year-old girl was mysteriously murdered.

When the crime was reported to the court on 5 May, by letter from the elected judge of S. Sebastião, Jerónimo José da Costa, the judge of law Dr. António Correia Botelho Teixeira Rebelo, ordered the examination of the girl's body and the examination of witnesses to be carried out in his presence on the same day. The surgeons António José de Faria and Domingos José Ribeiro e Silva, better known as Domingos de Rabiços, examined the corpse, and found four deep wounds and one superficial wound on the outer third of the left arm, and two more wounds on the chest between the third and fourth left ribs. These wounds looked as if they had been made by a bullet, and in the two wounds in the chest still the zagalots that had produced them. According to the surgeons' statement, death was an immediate and inevitable consequence of the chest wounds.

After hearing some carpenters who were working in Creixomil and had examined the carriage in which the unfortunate girl had been murdered, they declared that they had found the glass of the right door shattered, a shotguns cartridge embedded in the transom. When António de Nápoles was called to the stand, he was asked if he knew who could have committed or ordered the crime, he replied that, if suppositions were enough to justify complaints, he suspected that Rosinha do Toural was the commissioner.

The witnesses heard next, Joaquim de Sousa and Jerónimo da Silva added nothing new. On the same day, the administrator José Inácio de Abreu Vieira, known by his nickname Cutalho, carried out investigations at the Casa do Costeado and, entering the room where the corpse was, he discovered it, finding the injuries pointed out by the experts and also noticing small wounds, apparently caused by splinters caused by the shattered glass of the door, thrown up by the violence of the gunshot. When the maids assured him that the corpse had no other injuries, the administrator and his clerk, Luís António de Freitas, took their investigation no further and began to examine the clothes. The girl's pink silk dress, the vest, the white shirt and skirt were all soaked in blood, and the shirt, vest, the body of the dress and the shawl bore the holes of the shotgun bullets.

He then heard from the same carpenters about the damage to the carriage, and from the same witnesses who had testified before the judge. This investigation report was attached to the case file and, at the request of the delegate Francisco Leite Olireira da Costa Bernardes, a complaint was drawn up against Rosa Maria da Silva, also known as Rosinha do Toural. A popular song criticizing her fake friendly appearance and undesirable personality states:

A Rosinha do Toural (Rosinha do Toural)

Tem uma saia amarela; (Has a yellow skirt;)

Ela cuida que é de seda, (She takes care of things like they were silk,)

Ela é mas é de merda. (But she is actually just made of shit.)

— Popular 19th century song from Guimarães written by João de Meira.

The murder of the child was never discovered nor caught, but popularly it is believed that Rosinha do Toural orchestrated the entire thing.

The Casa do Costeado mysteriously suffered a massive fire on 6 April 1948.

=== 21st century ===
Aware of the importance of its past and taking on the civic responsibility of preserving its memory, the Costeado family handed over the House's documentary collection to the Martins Sarmento Society, guaranteeing its preservation and access for researchers and the curious to a unique collection, whose testimonies stretch from the first half of the 14th century to the 1980s.

The house remained in the family's possession until it was acquired by the Câmara municipal of Guimarães in 2018, with a view to installing a Hotel-School as part of the Cávado and Ave Polytechnic Institute.

The project started in October 2023 by substituting the old exterior roof made of ceramic tiles of the Costeado House and digging a hole farther back to place the foundations of the new Hotel-School building.

== See also ==
- List of buildings in Guimarães

== Bibliography ==
- Moraes, Maria Adelaide Pereira de (December 2001). Velhas Casas de Guimarães [Old Houses of Guimarães] (in Portuguese). Vol. 1. Porto: Centro de Estudos de Geneologia, Heráldica e História da Família da Universidade Moderna do Porto. ISBN 972-8682-11-5.
