= Padrão de D. João I =

Monument in Guimarães, Portugal

Padrão de Dom João I
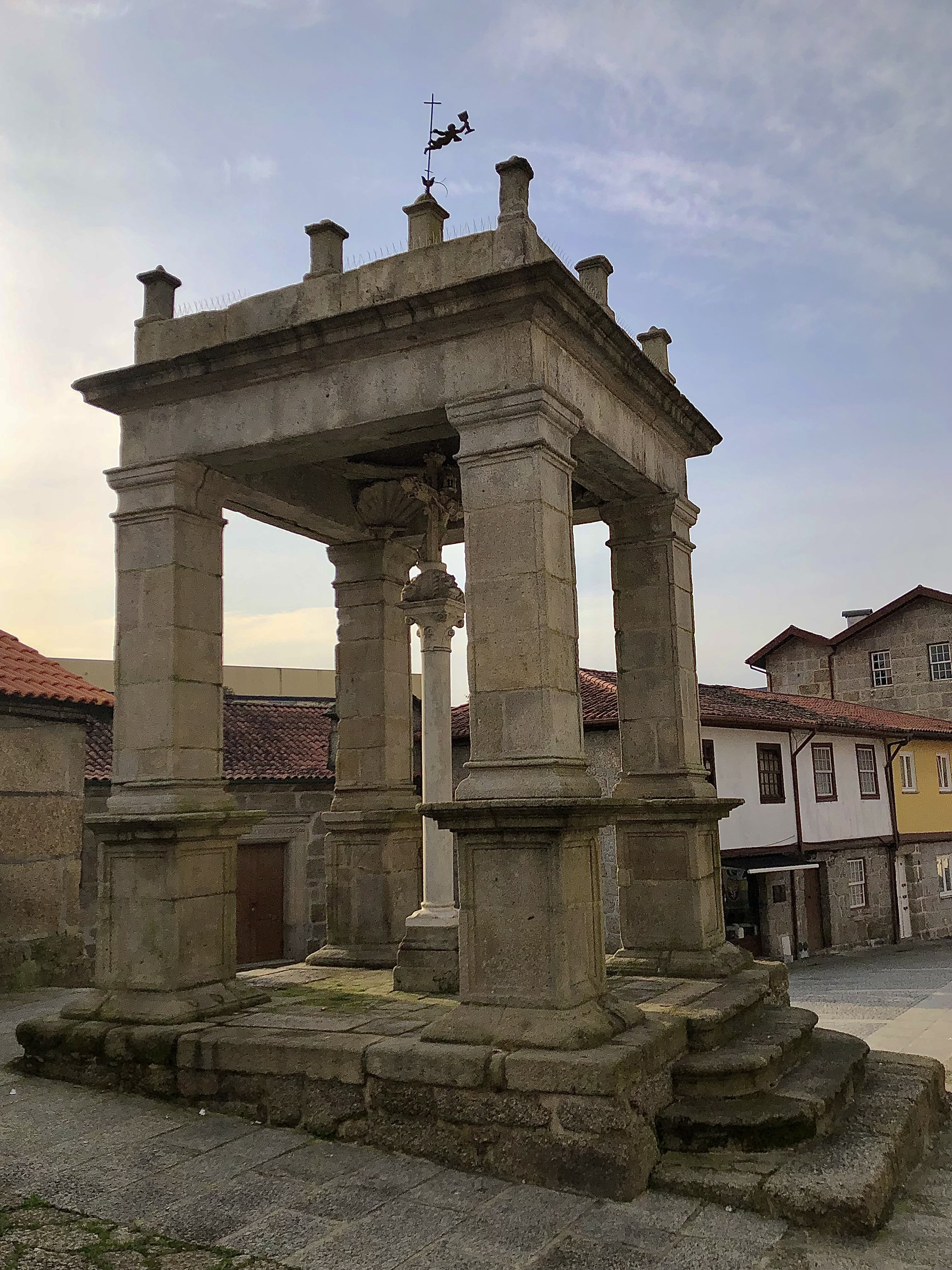
- Interactive map of Padrão de Dom João I
- Location: Creixomil, Guimarães
- Type: National monument
- Material: Granite
- Completion date: Around 1517
- Restored date: 1843/1935/1979
- Dedicated to: Portuguese victory at the Battle of Aljubarrota or the Portuguese conquest of Ceuta
- Alternative names: Padrão de Aljubarrota / Padrão de São Lázaro / Padrão dos Pombais

The Padrão de D. João I, also referred to as Padrão de Aljubarrota or Padrão de São Lázaro, is a monument at the end of the D. João I Street, in front of the Saint Lazarus Chapel, in the freguesia of Creixomil, Guimarães, Portugal.

The original monument is believed to have been erected to commemorate the Portuguese victory at the Battle of Aljubarrota, following King John I's entry into Guimarães in 1386, with construction of the standard beginning that year or the next. Although the current standard is not the original 15th-century one, nor are there any known records of its replacement, the existing monument was built sometime in the first half of the 16th century, possibly created following King Manuel I's foral in 1517.

It is classified as a National Monument since 1910, and located at the Guimarães Historic Centre Heritage Site since 2001.

== Description ==
Simple steps lead to the centre of the Padrão, where there is a cross with a floriated cross carved in Ançã stone. It's shaped as a Baldachin and it follows the Manueline style. Under the baldachin, is the image of Christ crucified. On the reverse, slightly lower down, is the depiction of the suffering Virgin Mary with the dead Christ in her lap.

== History ==
There are several versions attempting to explain the origin of this monument, erected by John I of Portugal in fulfillment of a promise made to Saint Mary of Guimarães. It is unclear whether this was for the victory of the Portuguese forces at the Battle of Aljubarrota in 1385 or, later, for the Conquest of Ceuta in 1415.

The current structure is not the original and although there is no known record of its replacement by the current one, the current padrão is a work formally dated to the first half of the 16th century, and possibly made following the confirmation of Guimarães' foral by King Manuel in 1517.

In 1843, the Padrão was in a state of ruin and was repaired by the Municipal Council. Shortly after, in 1863, due to the need to align the street leading to Famalicão, it was moved slightly further back and it is installed in its current location since 29 August 1864.

It was repaired in 1935 and restored in 1979, however the entire structure was vandalized in February 1996, and the cross in the center of the monument was once more destroyed on 30 July 2024.

== See also ==
- John I of Portugal
- List of buildings in Guimarães
- Padrão do Salado
