= Casa de Margaride =

Historic house in Guimarães, Portugal

House of Margaride
- Casa de Margaride
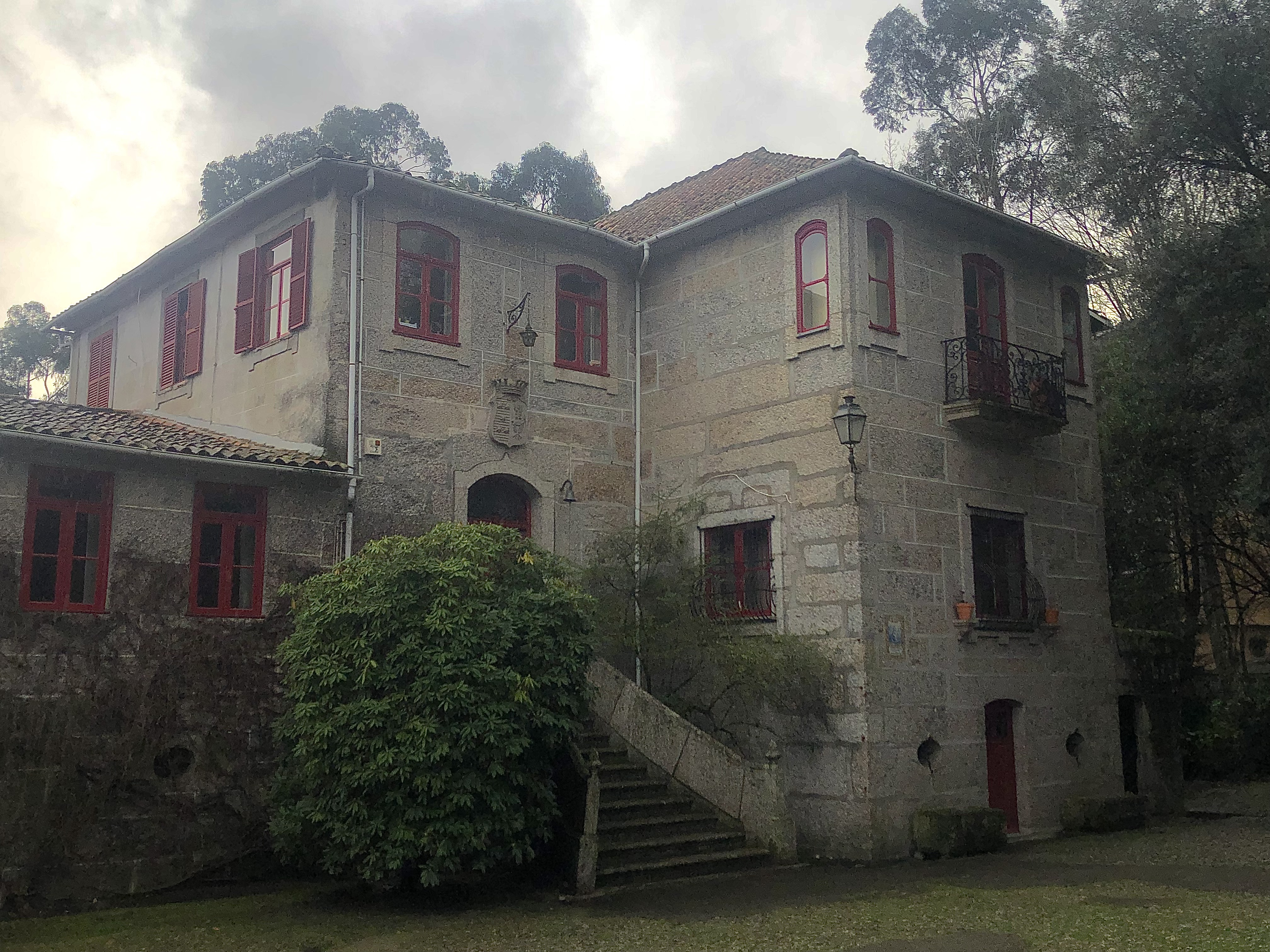
- The Casa de Margaride on 15 February 2024
- Interactive map of House of Margaride
- Location: Mesão Frio, Guimarães, Portugal
- Coordinates: 41.45031°N 8.27717°W
- Type: Quinta

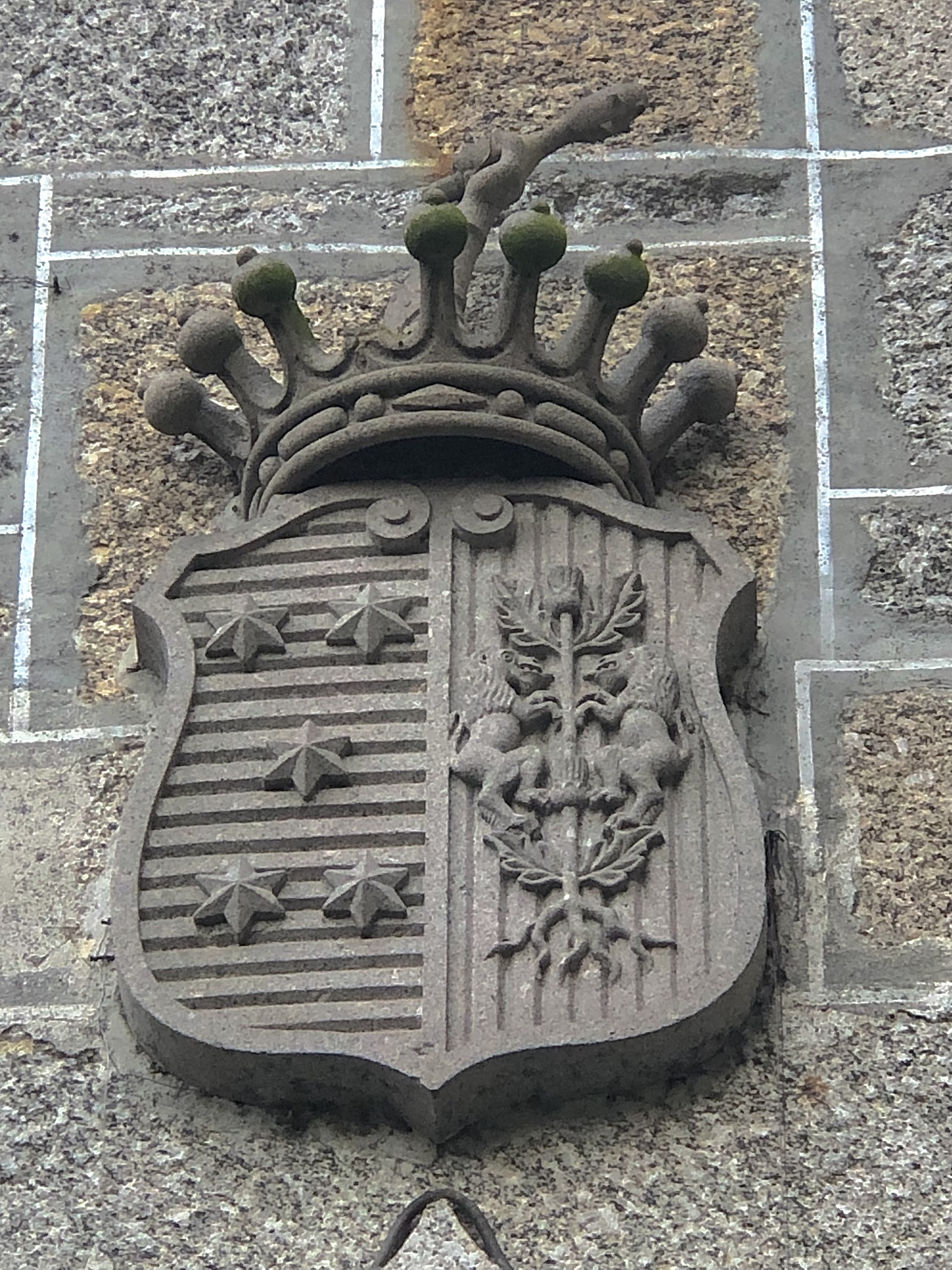
Coat of Arms of the Casa de Margaride.

The Casa de Margaride, or Casa e Quinta de Margaride, (House and Quinta of Margaride) is a noble historic house in the freguesia of Mesão Frio, in Guimarães, Portugal.

By Order No. 740-FI/2012, of 13.12.2012, the House of Margaride, its garden, agricultural facilities and adjacent woodland were classified as a Monument of Public Interest.

== History ==
The first lady known to have owned the Quinta was Countess Mumadona Dias, who bequeathed it to Sesita and her daughter Bronili, professed nuns. On 14 June 1021, the latter sold her theVilla Margaridi to Idila and his wife Astileova. Idila, together with his daughters Bronili and Felicia, sold it on 9 February 1044 to Dona Elsinda, also a professed nun. In 1059, in his inventory of properties and churches in Guimarães, Ferdinand I of Léon mentions only the Church of São Romão of Mesão Frio and the Quinta of Margaride in this area.

Centuries later, by donation of 18 May 1314, the estate of Margaride passed into the possession of the Canon of the Colegiada de Nossa Senhora da Oliveira of Guimarães. This fact determined that, from 7 November 1423, this property would benefit from the important “Privilege of the Red Boards”, granted on that date by John I of Portugal to the Collegiate Church of Guimarães.

Over the centuries, the estate was parceled out until, in the middle of the 17th century, it fell into the hands of the Counts of Margaride, whose descendants are owners of the estate to this day.

The 2024 Portuguese Tree of the Year, the Camélia, is located in the gardens of the Margaride estate.

== Characteristics ==
The first description of the house dates from 1507, and states: “Tower house, roofed, with three arched doors where João Gonçalves lives”.

The house currently consists of three distinct bodies:

- a late medieval building, supported by a square tower, the top floor of which was demolished at the end of the 19th century
- another body, which existed as early as 1507, whose balcony was built at the end of the 17th century
- the last and highest body is the result of the expansion works that took place at the end of the 19th century, when Henrique Cardoso de Macedo Martins e Menezes, the first-born son and successor of his father, the 1st Count of Margaride, settled there
- Also from the late 17th century is the arrangement of the house's yard with the construction of a set of walls, pyramids, a fountain with its water tank, all in a late-Mannerist style, all built when the gardens were constructed

== Bibliography ==
- COSTA, José Couceiro da. Villa Margariti - Da aurora da nacionalidade.

== See also ==
- List of buildings in Guimarães
