= Castello Lopes Cinemas =

Portuguese cinema chain

- Founded: 1916
- Headquarters: Lisbon, Portugal
- Products: Cinema and Home video
- Parent: Socorama Multimédia
- Website: castellolopescinemas.pt

Castello Lopes Cinemas is a Portuguese cinema chain, founded in 1916. It owns over 30 screens, distributed among six cinemas in Barreiro, Covilhã, Torres Novas, Sintra, Santarém and Guimarães.

== History ==
In 1916, José Martins Castello Lopes founded production and distribution company Castello Lopes and opened Cinema Condes, in the former Teatro da Rua dos Condes, located at Avenida da Liberdade in Lisbon. The company changed its name to Filmes Castello Lopes in the 1930s, and, by being the pioneer in film distribution and screening, it was, for several decades, the main reference for cinema in Portugal.

José Martins began as a bookkeeper and his interest in accounting took him to the cinema business. Aside from Lisbon, he lived between Paris, Barcelona and Berlin, at the end of the First World War, where he bought European films. In one of these cities, he established contact with US studios, thus becoming the first in Portugal to have the rights to distribute and release titles such as A Woman of Paris (by Charlie Chaplin) or A Dog's Life (by Buster Keaton) for the first time, on Condes.

In 1940, when it represented Columbia Pictures, the company unveiled its eagle logo. It was speculated that the choice of an eagle was due to Condes' manager, Virgílio Costa, being a army serviceman. At the time, the eagle was an important symbol.

In the 1950s, José Martins' sons, José Manuel and Gérard, took over its management, where they had a central role in the following decades. With Condes still open, the brothers opened Cinema Londres at Rome Avenue, in Lisbon, in 1972. The British inspiration not only came from the name, but also a British pub that shared space with the cinema, The Flag.

Filmes Castello Lopes represented key Hollywood studios such as MGM or Twentieth Century Fox and was responsible for the screening in Portugal of films such as The Wizard of Oz and Gone with the Wind, both by Victor Fleming, 2001: A Space Odyssey, by Stanley Kubrick or even the original Star Wars trilogy, by George Lucas. Filmes Castello Lopes was also a key name in bringing European cinema to Portugal, with the two brothers showing particular interest in French, Italian and German cinema. Under their hands, national screens received titles from filmmakers such as Rossellini, Tornatore, Godard, Truffaut and Fassbinder.

In the 1960s, Socorama – Castello Lopes was created, later part of a business group.

In 2012, the company had negative results of €1,7 million in gross revenue, with less 375,000 tickets sold, as a consequence of consumption retraction among the Portuguese. Until then, it was the second largest cinema chain in the Portuguese market, behind Cinemas NOS, with 106 screens nationwide. Between January and February 2013, it shut down all of its cinemas, first for not reaching an agreement to continue exploiting them with Sonae, with which it had 49 screens, and later for lack of appeals and debt. which led to its insolvency on 12 February for €14,8 million in debt. Subsequently, Castello Lopes Cinemas reopened some of its former cinemas, while others were taken over by Cineplace.
