= Serzedelo (Guimarães) =

Parish in Guimarães, Portugal

- Civil parish
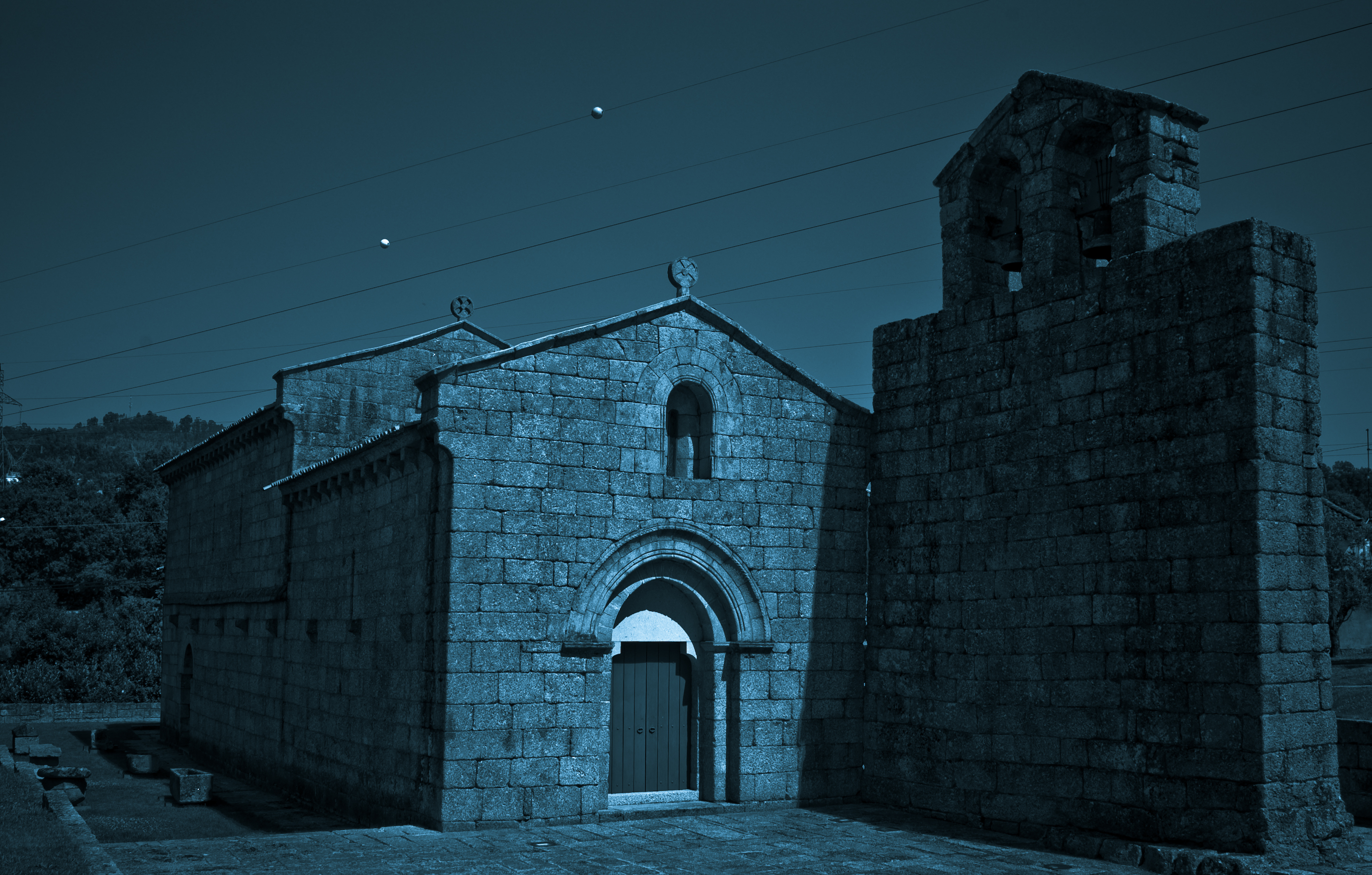
- Church of Serzedelo in 2007

- Coat of arms

- Location within Guimarães
- Coordinates: 41°24′08″N 8°22′07″W
- Country: Portugal
- Region: Norte
- Intermunic. comm.: Ave
- District: Braga
- Municipality: Guimarães

Area
  - Total: 5.14 km^{2} (1.98 sq mi)

Population (2021)
  - Total: 3,418
  - Density: 665/km^{2} (1,720/sq mi)
- Time zone: UTC+00:00 (WET)
  - Summer (DST): UTC+01:00 (WEST)
- Patron: Saint Christina

Serzedelo is a Portuguese town and the administrative centre of the parish of Serzedelo in the municipality of Guimarães. The parish covers an area of 5.14 km^{2} (1.98 sq mi) and has a population of 3,418 (2021 census), giving it a population density of 665 inhabitants per km^{2}.

Serzedelo was granted official town status by Law No. 79/95 of 30 August 1995.

Serzedelo lies about 13 km from the city of Guimarães. It is first mentioned in a document dating from 1038, having belonged to the medieval estate of Vermoim. It is mentioned at length in the Inquirições from 1220 onwards. Its parish church, probably dating from the 12th century, is a fine example of a Romanesque church. This parish was incorporated into the municipality of Guimarães on 30 December 1853, after being transferred from Vila Nova de Famalicão. It was an abbey subject to the Ordinary's right of presentation, within the lands of Barcelos, and a commandery of the Order of Christ.

== Demography ==
The population registered in the census was:

Population of the parish of Serzedelo

Year	Pop.	±%
1864	593	—
1878	639	+7.8%
1890	736	+15.2%
1900	853	+15.9%
1911	935	+9.6%
1920	907	−3.0%
1930	1,067	+17.6%
1940	1,454	+36.3%

Year	Pop.	±%
1950	2,266	+55.8%
1960	2,922	+28.9%
1970	3,078	+5.3%
1981	3,739	+21.5%
1991	4,057	+8.5%
2001	4,073	+0.4%
2011	3,680	−9.6%
2021	3,418	−7.1%

Distribution of the population by Age Groups
Year	0–14	15–24	25–64	> 65
2001	758	696	2212	407
2011	489	467	2204	520
2021	382	324	1910	802
