= Arosa e Castelões =

- Civil parish
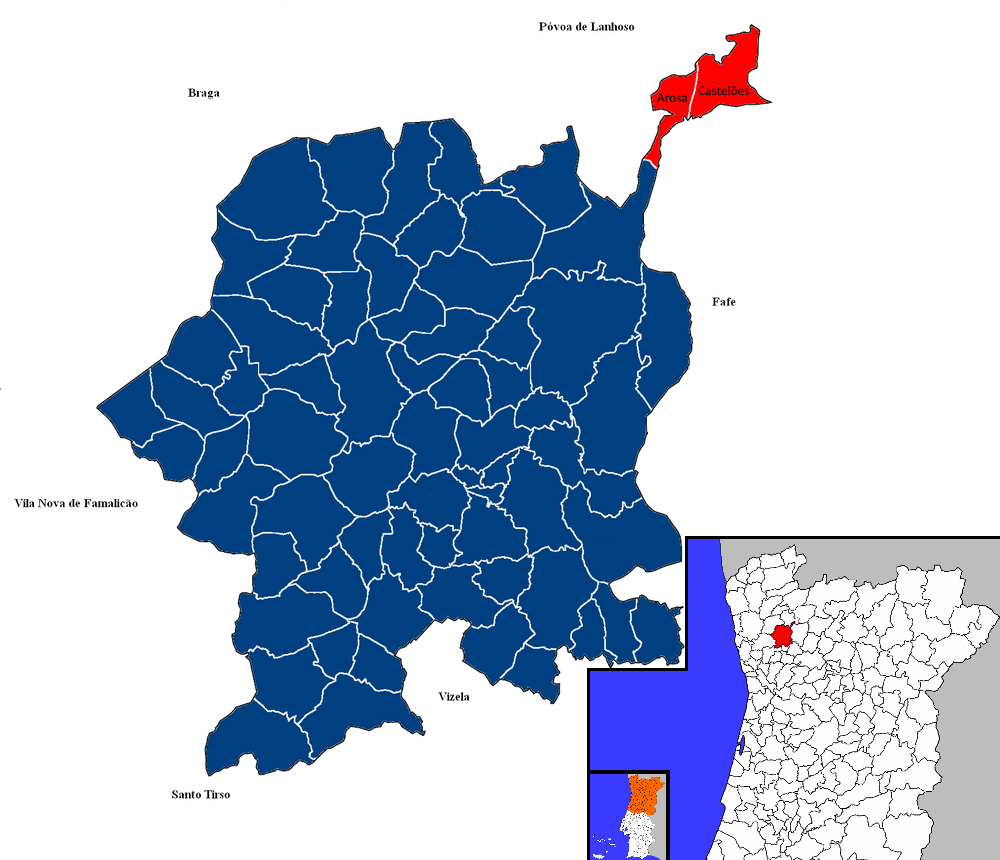
- Coordinates: 41.553°N 8.212°W
- Country: Portugal
- Region: Norte
- Intermunic. comm.: Ave
- District: Braga
- Municipality: Guimarães

Area
  - Total: 5.52 km^{2} (2.13 sq mi)

Population (2021)
  - Total: 699
  - Density: 130/km^{2} (330/sq mi)
- Time zone: UTC+00:00 (WET)
  - Summer (DST): UTC+01:00 (WEST)

Arosa e Castelões (officially: União das Freguesias de Arosa e Castelões) is a civil parish in the municipality of Guimarães, Portugal. It was formed in 2013 by the merger of the former parishes Arosa and Castelões. The population in 2021 was 699, in an area of 5.52 km^{2}.
