= Serzedo e Calvos =

- Civil parish
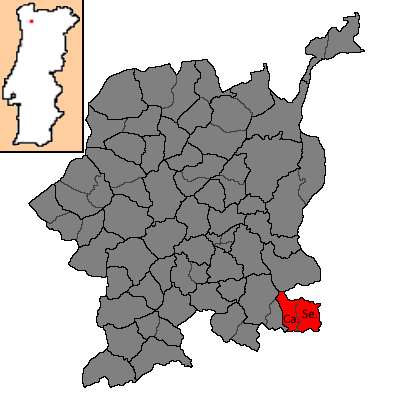
- Coordinates: 41.404°N 8.239°W
- Country: Portugal
- Region: Norte
- Intermunic. comm.: Ave
- District: Braga
- Municipality: Guimarães

Area
  - Total: 4.50 km^{2} (1.74 sq mi)

Population (2021)
  - Total: 2,265
  - Density: 503/km^{2} (1,300/sq mi)
- Time zone: UTC+00:00 (WET)
  - Summer (DST): UTC+01:00 (WEST)
- Website: https://www.facebook.com/profile.php?id=100064833932575

Serzedo e Calvos (officially: União das Freguesias de Serzedo e Calvos) is a civil parish in the municipality of Guimarães, Portugal. It was formed in 2013 by the merger of the former parishes Serzedo and Calvos. The population in 2021 was 2,265, in an area of 4.50 km^{2}.

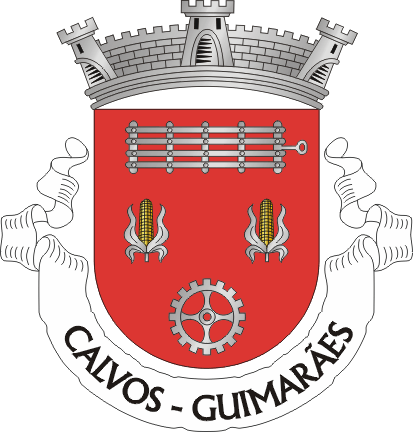
Calvos coat of arms

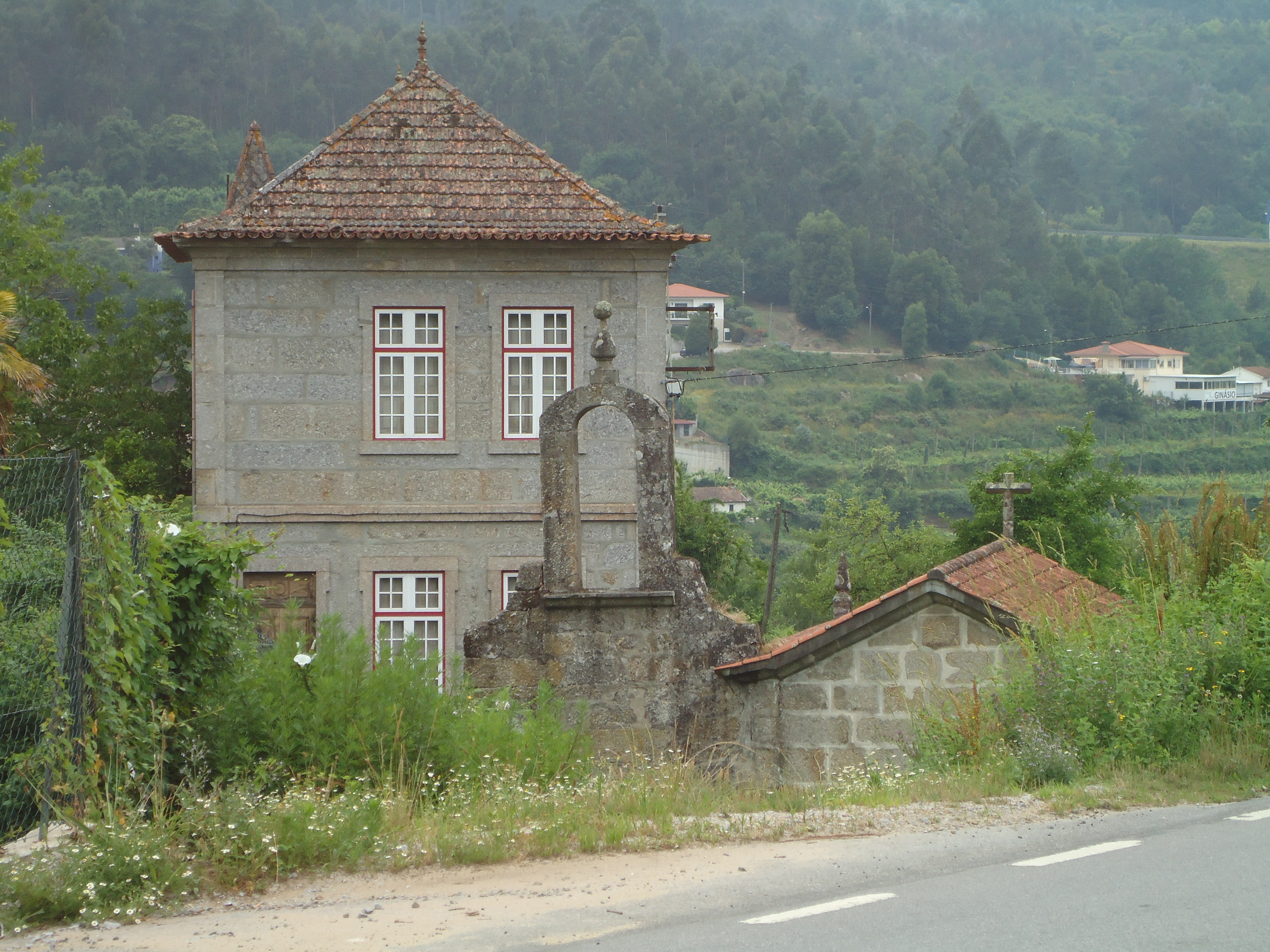
Serzedo
