= Casa das Rótulas =

Historic house in Guimarães, Portugal

House of the Rótulas
- Casa das Rótulas
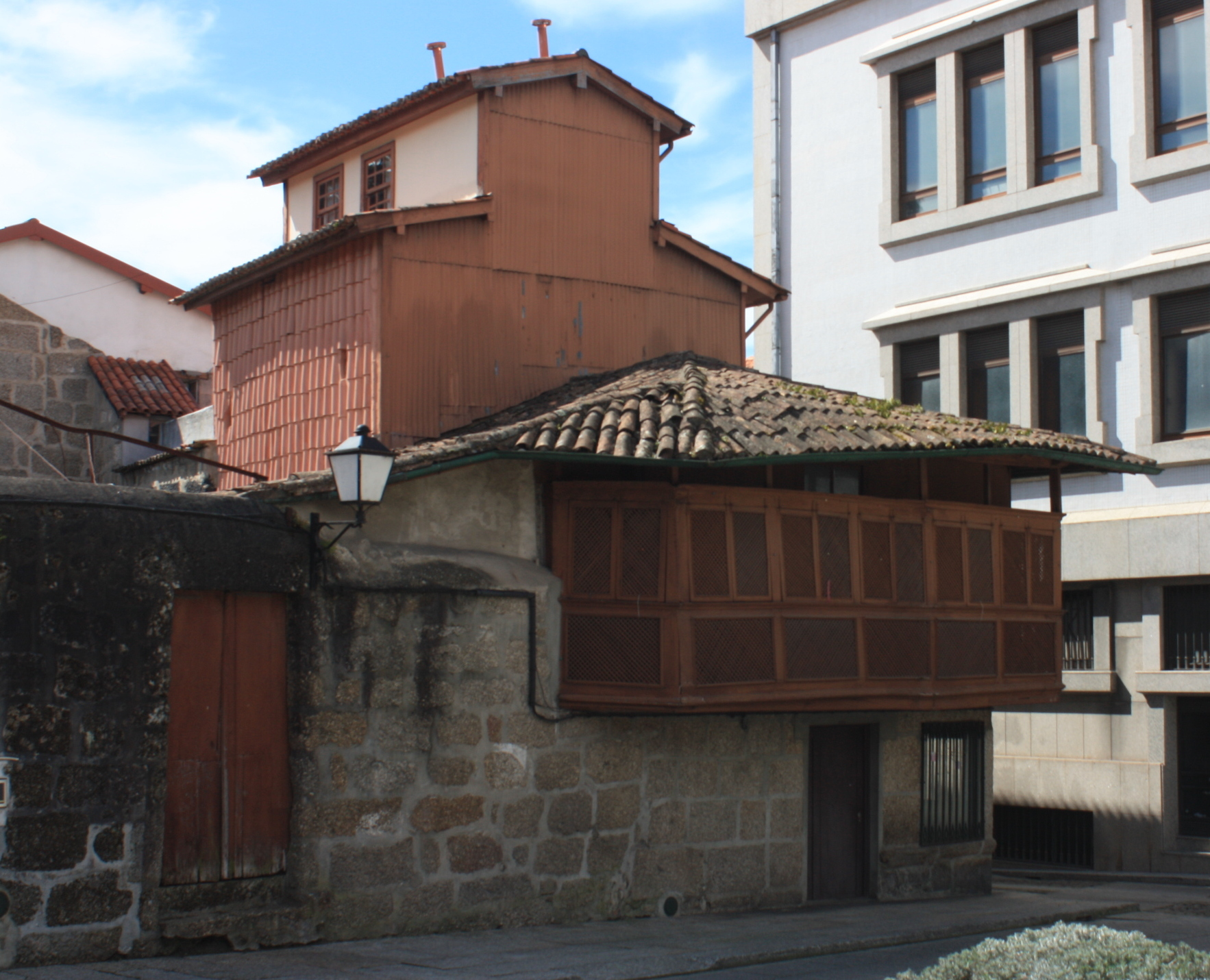
- Casa das Rótulas in March 2021
- Interactive map of the House of the Rótulas area

General information
- Status: Inserted inside the GHC
- Architectural style: Portuguese medieval architecture
- Classification: Protected landmark
- Location: Guimarães, Portugal
- Coordinates: 41.44390°N 8.29432°W
- Year built: Early 1600s
- Renovated: 2005

Technical details
- Floor count: 2

The House of the Rótulas (Portuguese: Casa das Rótulas) is a 17th-century house in Guimarães, Portugal. Its name derives from its Rótulas balcony, a variation of the traditional Italian Gelosia.

== History ==
From the second half of the 16th century onward, Guimarães experienced a period of urban growth, marked by the city’s expansion beyond the perimeter of its medieval walls. One of the new urban centers established during this time was the site where the Misericórdia Church was built. This construction led to the creation of a public square in front of the church, as well as the development of new streets in the surrounding area.

During the 17th and 18th centuries, some of the town’s most prominent manor houses were built in this district, including the Casa dos Araújo e Abreu, Casa Mota Prego, Casa dos Coutos and the Casa dos Navarro de Andrade. It was also in one of the streets adjacent to Misericórdia Square that, around the early 17th century, the Casa das Rótulas was constructed. This building features elements seen nowhere else in the city, such as the use of wooden shutter balcony on its upper-floor. It is part of a broader group of residential buildings erected during Guimarães’ urban renewal, which introduced substantial departures from the city’s medieval architecture.

On 3 January 1986, the house was classified as a Building of Public Interest by Decree No. 1/86, published in the Diário da República, No. 2. On 30 November 1993, this designation was changed to Municipal Interest.

In 2001, the Historic Centre of Guimarães was designated a UNESCO World Heritage Site, with the Casa das Rótulas being included within the protected perimeter. The building underwent restoration works in 2005.
