= Casa de Sezim =

Building in Guimarãeses, Braga District, Portugal

Manor of Sezim
- Casa Grande/Paço de Sezim
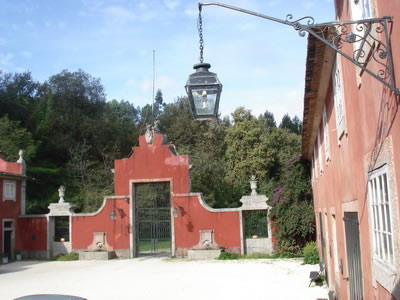
- The colourful walled entrance-way to the courtyard of the Manor of Sezim
- Interactive map of the Manor of Sezim area

General information
- Type: Manor
- Location: Nespereira, Portugal
- Coordinates: 41°24′53.53″N 8°19′41.70″W
- Opened: c. 1375

Technical details
- Material: Granite masonry

Website
- http://www.sezim.pt/en

The Manor of Sezim (Portuguese: Casa Grande/Paços de Sezim) is an 18th-century crested-manor home in the civil parish of Nespereira, in the municipality of Guimarães. It is known for its white wines.
