= Raul Brandão Municipal Library =

Municipal library of Guimarães

Coordinates: 41.44428°N 8.29293°W

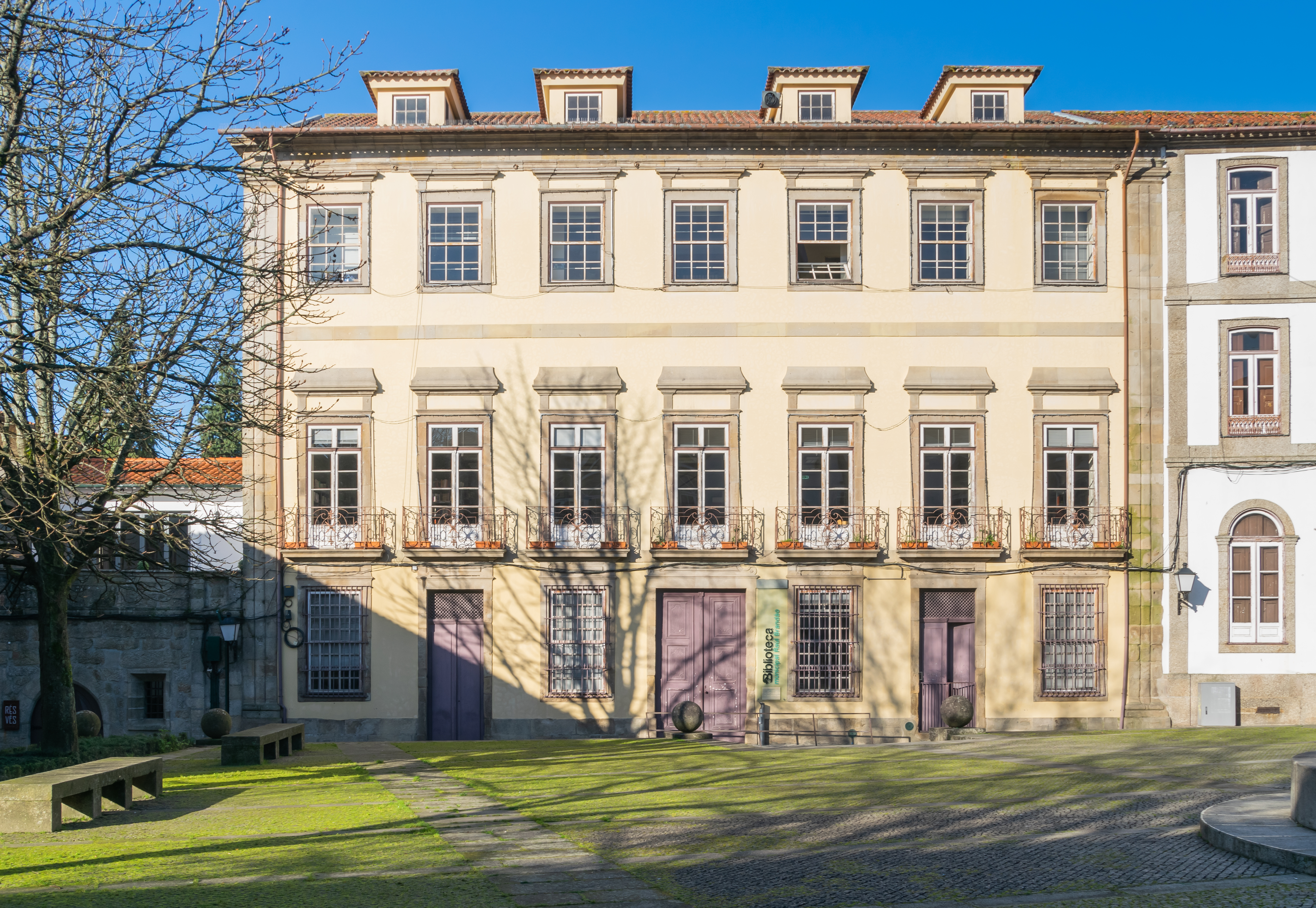
The Raul Brandão Municipal Library, previously known as House of the Carneiros (Casa dos Carneiros).

The Raul Brandão Municipal Library (Portuguese: Biblioteca Municipal Raul Brandão) is located in Guimarães, and it has been part of the National Public Reading Network (Rede Nacional de Leitura Pública) since 1987.

The library was created after the Portuguese writer Branquinho da Fonseca was invited by Azeredo Perdigão, in 1958, to found and direct the library services of the Calouste Gulbenkian Foundation.

== History ==
The building of the Raul Brandão Municipal Library was built in 1834 and it served as the house of the Carneiros family.

In 1964, the board of the Círculo de Arte e Recreio (CAR) sent a request for support to the Calouste Gulbenkian Foundation, and two years later, in 1966, the Calouste Gulbenkian Foundation Fixed Library No. 127 was inaugurated at the CAR headquarters.

Between 1975 and 1992, the library was housed in the old Paços do Concelho de Guimarães. In 1987, the project to create a municipal library began. On March 7, 1992, the Raul Brandão Municipal Library was inaugurated, located in Largo Cónego José Maria Gomes.

As of April 2023, the library has a collection of approximately 90,000 items, including books, magazines, newspapers and other materials in the areas of literature, history, geography, art, social sciences, as well as an audiovisual section.

The Raul Brandão Municipal Library offers home loan services, local consultation, free internet access and access to digital databases. The space also hosts cultural activities such as exhibitions, lectures, courses and workshops.

== Tribute ==
The name given to the Guimarães Municipal Library is a tribute to the Portuguese soldier, journalist and writer Raul Germano Brandão, who lived in Guimarães after being assigned to the 20th Infantry Regiment as an ensign. Brandão lived in the city between 1886 and 1901, where he married Maria Angelina de Araújo Abreu.

== Organizations that the Raul Brandão Municipal Library is part of ==
- Member of the National Public Reading Network (Rede Nacional de Leitura Pública) since 1987.
- Twinned with the Bibliothéques Associées (UNAL), affiliated to UNESCO, since 1993.
- Member of the Portuguese Section of the International Board on Books for Young People (IBBY).
- Cooperating with the municipality's schools in the creation and dissemination of school libraries, and in the organization of cultural programmes related to books and reading.
- Founding member of Bibliomédia – Associação de Bibliotecas para a Cooperação, which develops activities such as: exchange of exhibitions, professional experiences, interlibrary loans, organization of services and seminars and publication of a magazine.

== See also ==
- List of libraries in Portugal
