= Oliveira, São Paio e São Sebastião =

- Civil parish
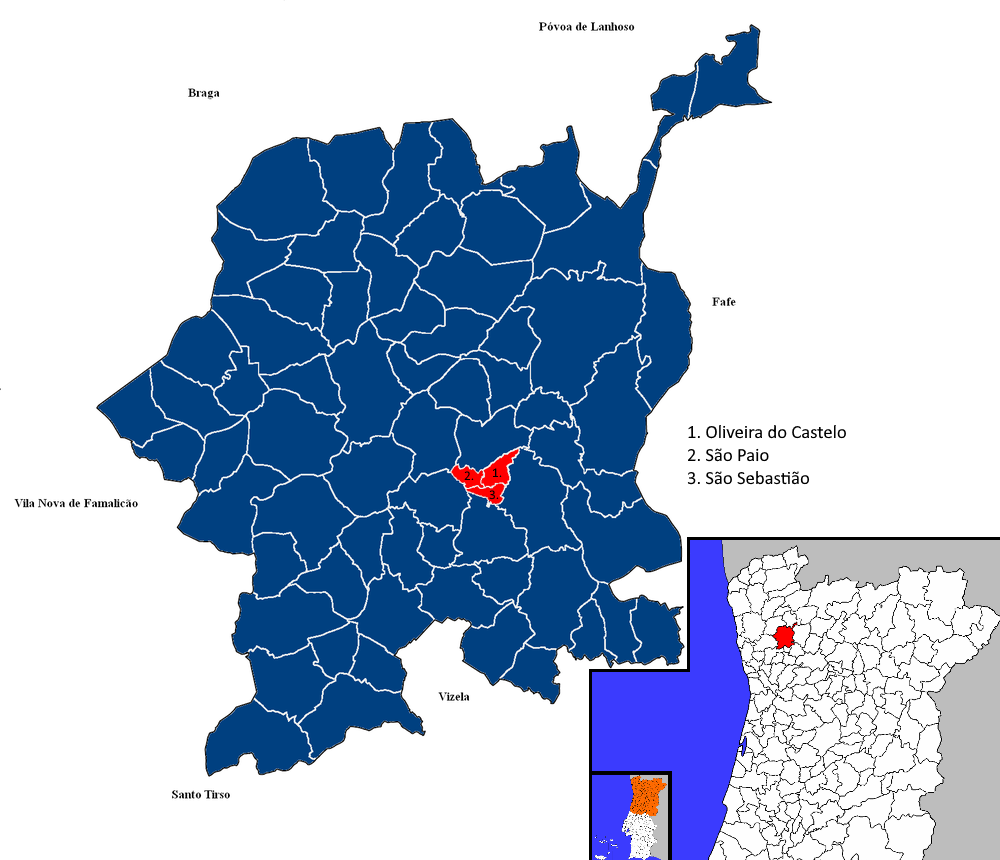
- Coordinates: 41.443°N 8.293°W
- Country: Portugal
- Region: Norte
- Intermunic. comm.: Ave
- District: Braga
- Municipality: Guimarães

Area
  - Total: 1.55 km^{2} (0.60 sq mi)

Population (2021)
  - Total: 7,832
  - Density: 5,100/km^{2} (13,000/sq mi)
- Time zone: UTC+00:00 (WET)
  - Summer (DST): UTC+01:00 (WEST)
- Website: http://ufcidadeguimaraes.com/

Oliveira, São Paio e São Sebastião (officially: União das Freguesias de Oliveira, São Paio e São Sebastião) is a civil parish in the municipality of Guimarães, Portugal. It was formed in 2013 by the merger of the former parishes Oliveira do Castelo, São Paio, and São Sebastião. The population in 2021 was 7,832, in an area of 1.55 km^{2}. The civil parish makes up the city centre of Guimarães.

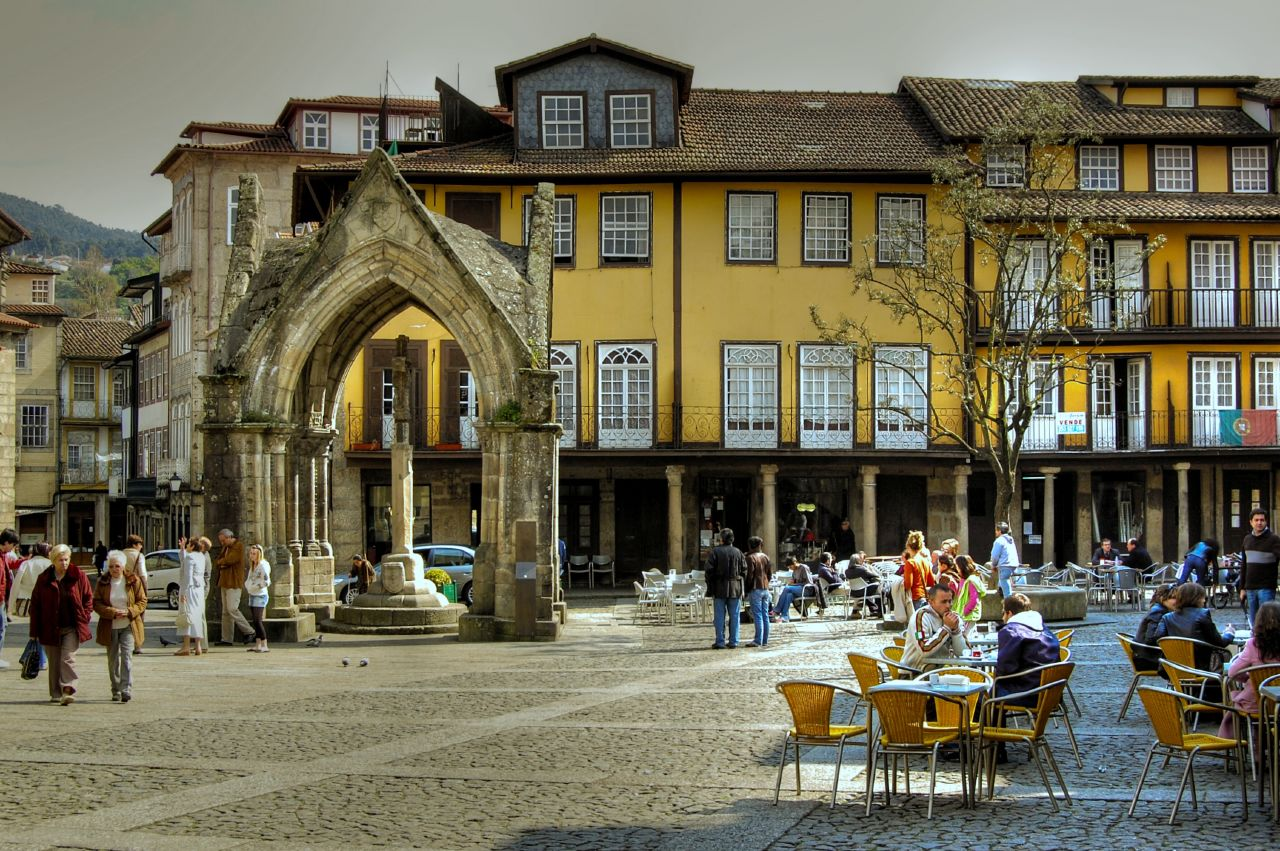
Oliveira square

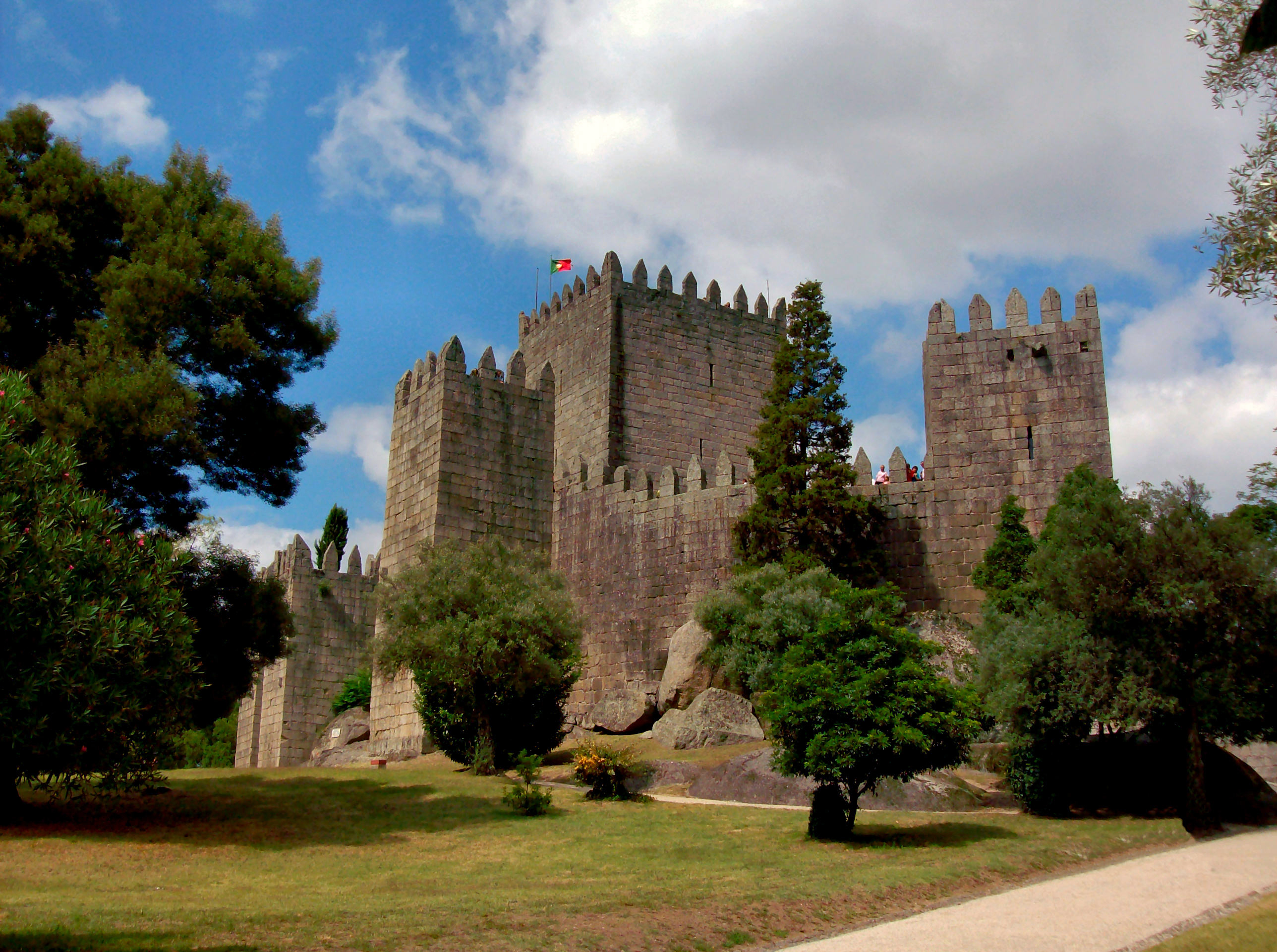
Castle of Guimarães

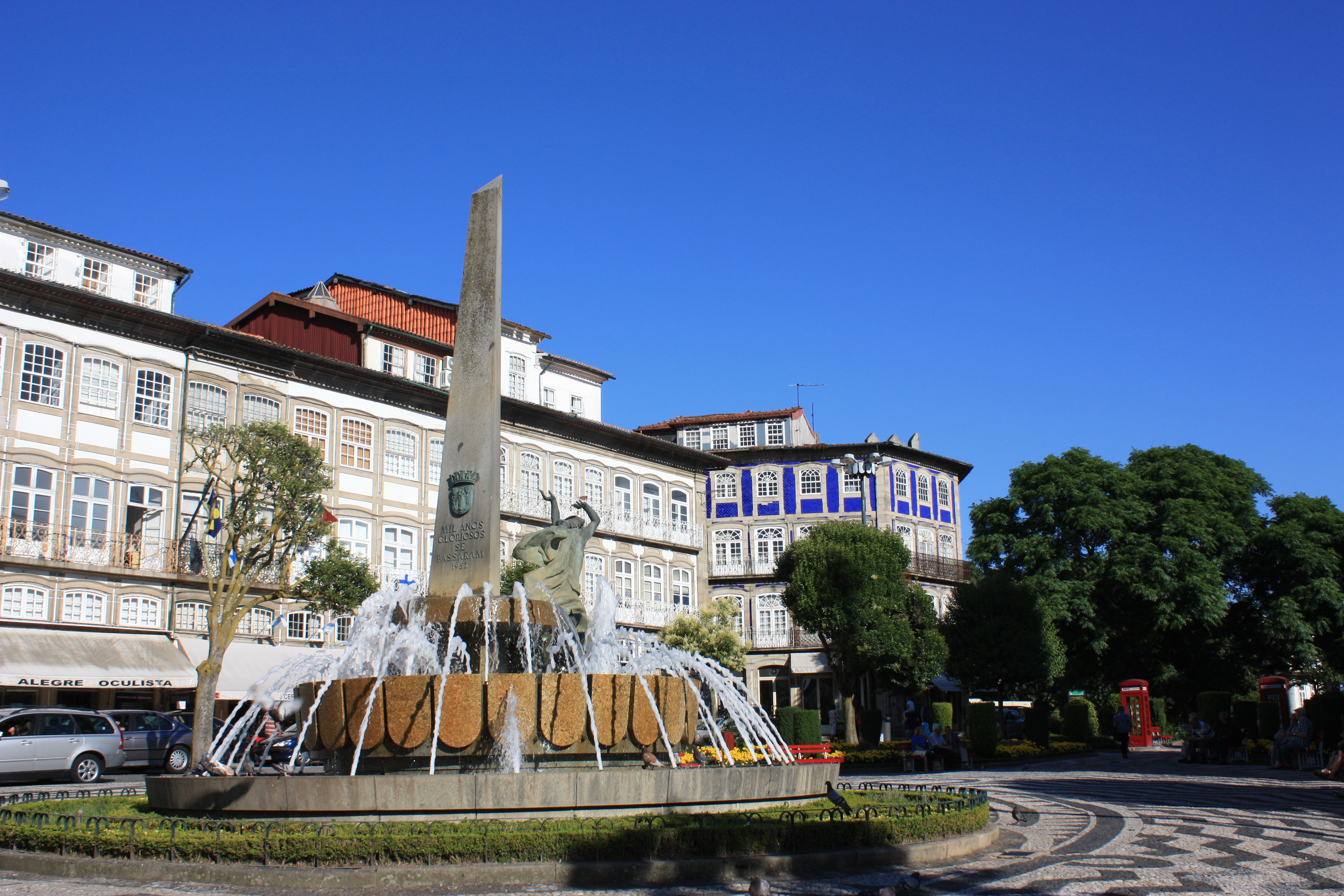
Toural square

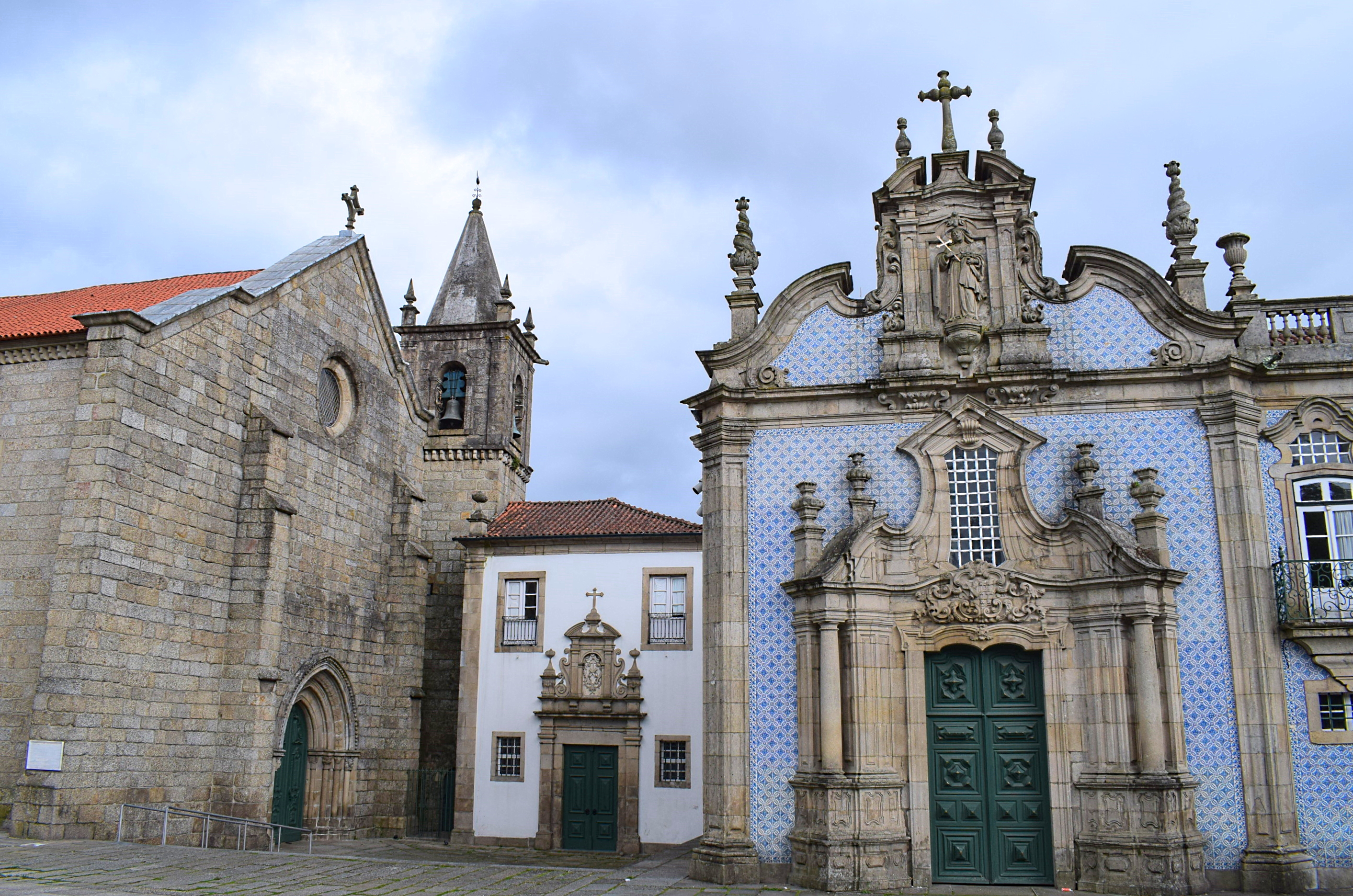
Convento de São Francisco
