= Civil Parishes of Guimarães =

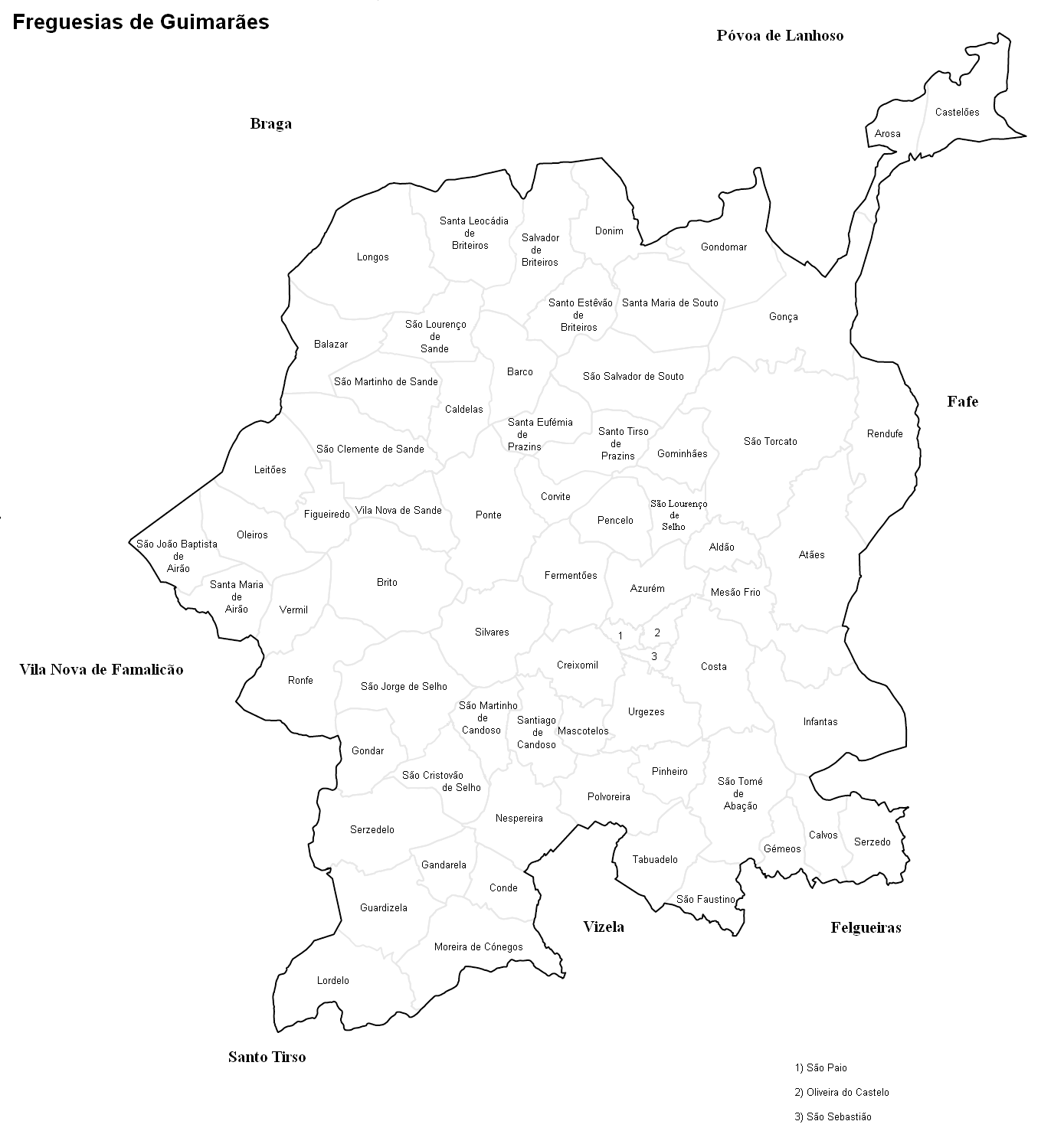
The freguesias of Guimarães before and after the administrative reorganization of the portuguese territory of 2013

Guimarães is divided into 48 civil parishes, most of which were created as civil entities in the 19th century and some were merged in the 21st century. These parishes are grouped into three areas recognized by the Municipal masterplan: urban (city), suburban and rural.

== Current parishes ==
Currently, the municipality is divided into 48 civil parishes (freguesias), some are unions of previously existing parishes, and others remained untouched after the reorganization of the territory in 2013:

- Abação e Gémeos
- Airão Santa Maria, Airão São João e Vermil
- Aldão
- Arosa e Castelões
- Atães e Rendufe
- Azurém
- Barco
- Briteiros Salvador e Briteiros Santa Leocádia
- Briteiros Santo Estêvão e Donim
- Brito
- Caldas das Taipas (Caldelas)
- Candoso (São Martinho)
- Candoso São Tiago e Mascotelos
- Conde e Gandarela
- Costa
- Creixomil
- Fermentões
- Gonça
- Gondar
- Guardizela
- Infantas
- Leitões, Oleiros e Figueiredo
- Longos
- Lordelo
- Mesão Frio
- Moreira de Cónegos
- Nespereira
- Oliveira, São Paio e São Sebastião
- Pencelo
- Pinheiro
- Polvoreira
- Ponte
- Prazins (Santa Eufémia)
- Prazins Santo Tirso e Corvite
- Ronfe
- Sande São Lourenço e Balazar
- Sande (São Martinho)
- Sande Vila Nova e Sande São Clemente
- São Torcato
- Selho (São Cristóvão)
- Selho (São Jorge)
- Selho São Lourenço e Gominhães
- Serzedelo
- Serzedo e Calvos
- Silvares
- Souto Santa Maria, Souto São Salvador e Gondomar
- Tabuadelo e São Faustino
- Urgezes

== Extinct parishes ==
Before their extinction in 2013, Guimarães had a total of 69 different parishes, some were extinct and others were merged:

- Abação
- Arosa
- Atães
- Balazar (Guimarães)
- Calvos (Guimarães)
- Castelões
- Conde (Guimarães)
- Corvite
- Donim
- Figueiredo (Guimarães)
- Gandarela
- Gémeos
- Gominhães
- Gondomar
- Leitões
- Mascotelos
- Oleiros (Guimarães)
- Oliveira do Castelo
- Rendufe
- Salvador de Briteiros
- Santa Leocádia de Briteiros
- Santa Maria de Airão
- Santa Maria de Souto
- Santiago de Candoso
- Santo Estêvão de Briteiros
- Santo Tirso de Prazins
- São Clemente de Sande
- São Faustino
- São João Batista de Airão
- São Lourenço de Sande
- São Lourenço de Selho
- São Paio
- São Salvador de Souto
- São Sebastião
- São Tomé de Abação
- Serzedo (Guimarães)
- Tabuadelo
- Vermil
- Vila Nova de Sande

== See also ==
- Guimarães
- Freguesia
- Geography of Portugal
