= Guimarães Municipal Chamber =

Legislative body of Guimarães

Coordinates: 41.44437°N 8.29198°W

Guimarães Municipal Chamber Câmara Municipal de Guimarães
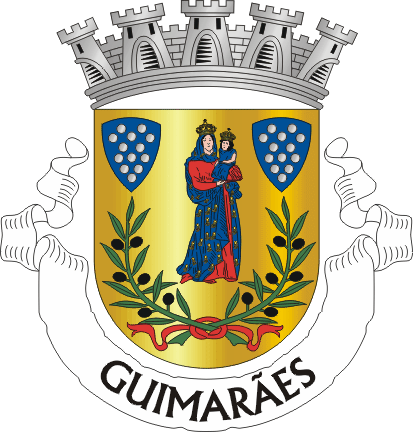
- Coat of arms of the city of Guimarães

Type
- Type: Câmara municipal
- Term limits: 3

History
- Founded: 1096; 929 years ago (or older)

Leadership
- President: Ricardo Araújo, PSD-CDS–PP since 25 October 2025
- Vice President: Eduardo Leite, PSD-CDS–PP since 25 October 2025

Structure
- Seats: 11
- Political groups: Municipal Executive (6) PSD-CDS–PP (6) Opposition (5) PS (4) CH (1)
- Length of term: Four years

Elections
- Last election: 12 October 2025
- Next election: 2029

Meeting place
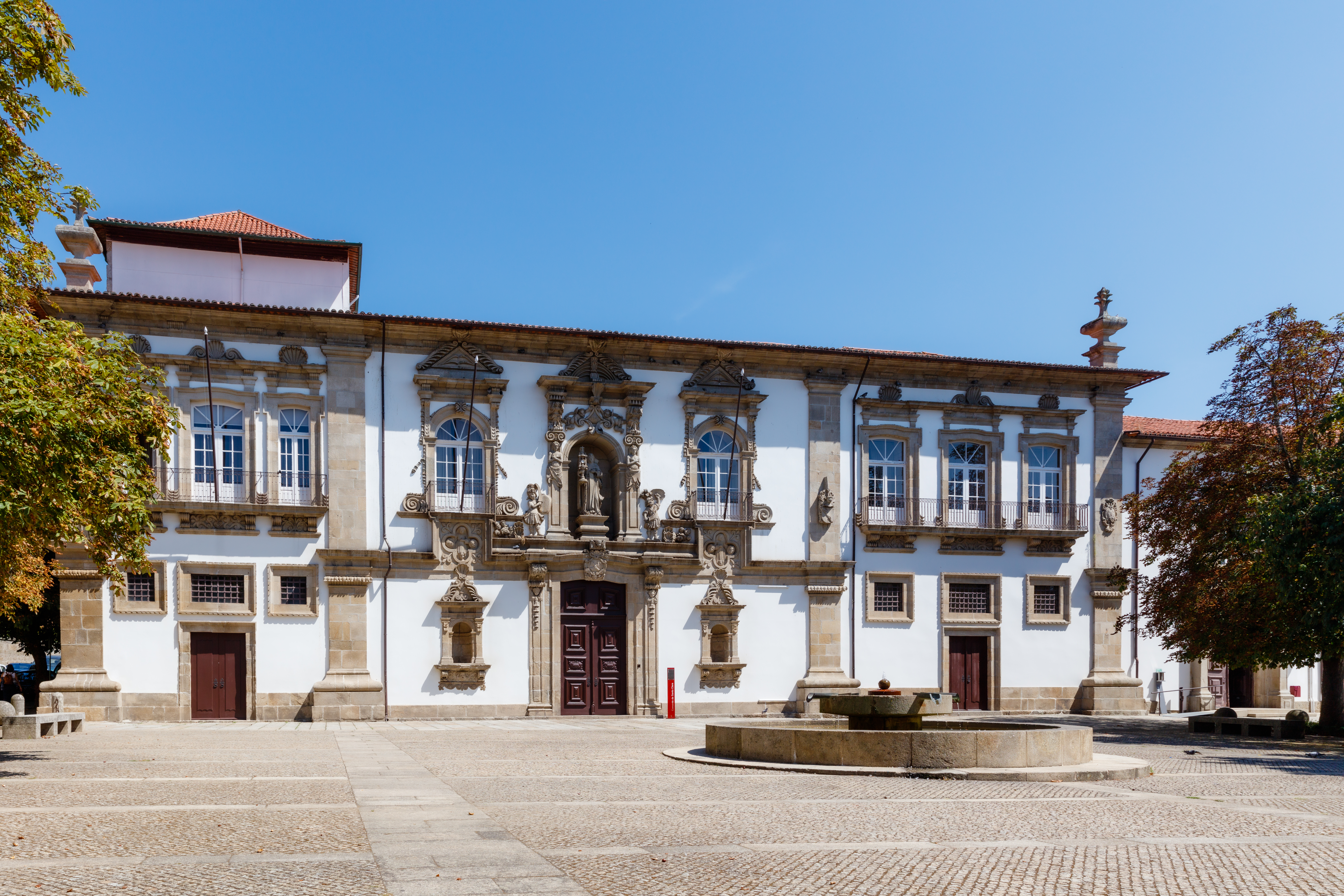
- Paços do Concelho de Guimarães

Website
- www.cm-guimaraes.pt

The Guimarães Municipal Chamber (Portuguese: Câmara Municipal de Guimarães) is the administrative authority in the municipality of Guimarães. It has 48 freguesias in its area of jurisdiction and is based in the city of Guimarães, on the Braga District. These freguesias are: Abação e Gémeos; Airão Santa Maria, Airão São João e Vermil; Aldão; Arosa e Castelões, Atães e Rendufe; Azurém; Barco; Briteiros Salvador e Briteiros Santa Leocádia; Briteiros Santo Estêvão e Donim; Brito; Caldelas; Candoso (São Martinho); Candoso São Tiago e Mascotelos; Conde e Gandarela; Costa; Creixomil; Fermentões; Gonça; Gondar; Guardizela; Infantas; Leitões, Oleiros e Figueiredo; Longos; Lordelo; Mesão Frio; Moreira de Cónegos; Nespereira; Oliveira, São Paio e São Sebastião; Pencelo; Pinheiro; Polvoreira; Ponte; Prazins (Santa Eufémia); Prazins Santo Tirso e Corvite; Ronfe; Sande São Lourenço e Balazar; Sande (São Martinho); Sande Vila Nova e Sande São Clemente; São Torcato; Selho (São Cristóvão); Selho (São Jorge); Selho São Lourenço e Gominhães; Serzedelo; Serzedo e Calvos; Silvares; Souto Santa Maria, Souto São Salvador e Gondomar; Tabuadelo e São Faustino and Urgezes.

The Guimarães City Council is made up of 11 councillors, representing, currently, three different political forces. The first candidate on the list with the most votes in a municipal election or, in the event of a vacancy, the next candidate on the list, takes office as President of the Municipal Chamber.

== List of the Presidents of the Municipal Chamber of Guimarães ==
- José Coelho da Mota Prego – (1???–1???)
- ??? – (18??–18??) president by 1841
- ??? – (18??–18??) president by 1863 or 1864
- Paulo de Melo Sampaio Freitas do Amaral – (18??–18??) president by 1866
- Luís Cardoso Martins da Costa Macedo – (1870)
- Luís Cardoso Martins da Costa Macedo – (1878)
- António Coelho Mota Prego – (18??–188?) president by 1882
- Luís Cardoso Martins da Costa Macedo – (1887–1892)
- António Coelho Mota Prego – (189?–18??) president by 1893, 1894, 1896 and 1898
- ??? – (1???–190?) president by 1903
- João Gomes de Oliveira Guimarães – (1905–1910)
- José Pinto Teixeira de Abreu – (1910–1912)
- Mariano Felgueiras – (1912–1917)
- Rocha dos Santos – (1918–1919)
- José Joaquim de Oliveira Bastos – (1919)
- Mariano Felgueiras – (1919)
- Francisco Moreira Sampaio – (1919–1922)
- António Lopes de Carvalho – (1922)
- Mariano Felgueiras – (1923–1926)
- Gonçalo Monteiro de Meira – (1927–1928)
- António Coelho Mota Prego – (1928–19??) president by 1928
- Duarte do Amaral Pinto de Freitas – (1929–1931)
- Rocha dos Santos – (1931–1934)
- José Francisco dos Santos – (193?–1937)
- José Magalhães e Couto – (1937–1939)
- Rocha dos Santos – (1939–1945)
- Fernando Manuel Castro Gonçalves – (1945–1947)
- Augusto Fernandes de Castro Ferreira e Cunha – (1947–1949)
- João Martins – (1949–1951)
- Augusto Fernandes de Castro Ferreira e Cunha – (1951–1954)
- José Magalhães e Couto – (1954–1955)
- José Castro Ferreira – (1955–1963)
- João Martins – (1963–1965)
- José Pinto de Oliveira – (1965–1966)
- João Mendes Ribeiro – (1966–1969)
- Bernardino Abreu – (1969–1974)
- José Augusto da Silva – (1974–1976)
- Edmundo Marques Campos – (1976–1979)
- António Augusto Xavier – (1979–1982)
- Manuel Ferreira – (1982–1985)
- António Augusto Xavier – (1985–1989)
- António Magalhães Silva – (1989–2013)
- Domingos Bragança – (2013–2025)
- Ricardo Araújo – (2025–present)

(The list is incomplete)
