= Castanheiro Factory =

Historic factory in Guimarães, Portugal

- Fábrica do Castanheiro
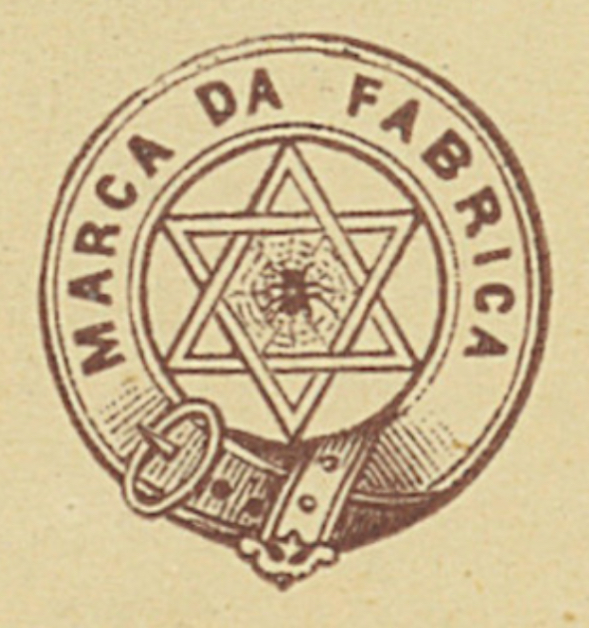
- The factory's logo

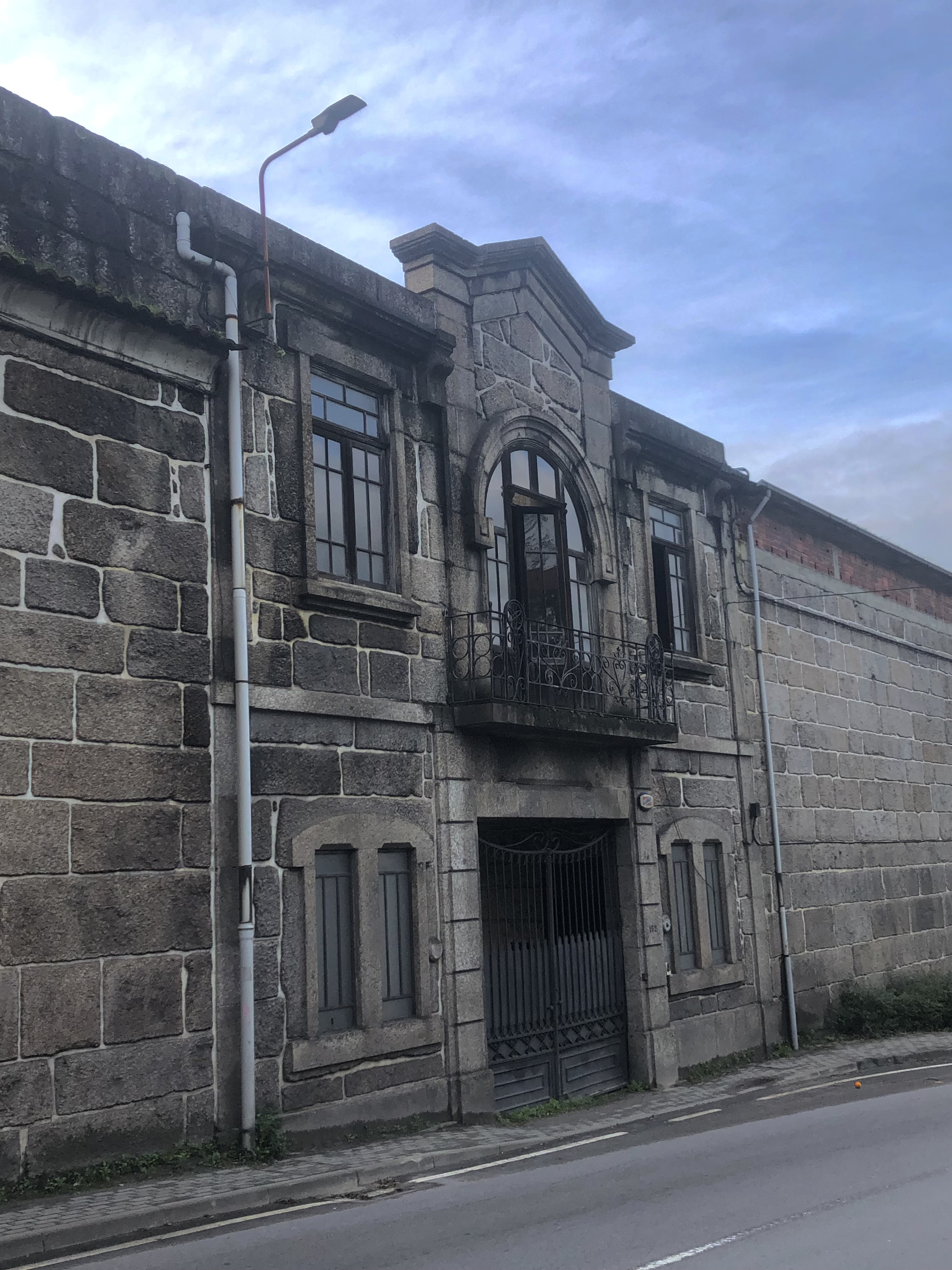
- The Castanheiro Factory’s main entrance, January 2024.
- Interactive map of the Castanheiro Factory area

General information
- Status: Partially demolished to build apartment buildings
- Type: Factory
- Location: Urgezes, Guimarães, Portugal
- Coordinates: 41.43433°N 8.30074°W
- Construction started: 1883
- Opened: 1851
- Inaugurated: 1885
- Closed: December 2013
- Demolished: 2022-2025

The Castanheiro Factory (Portuguese: Fábrica do Castanheiro) was a textile factory in Urgezes, Guimarães, inaugurated in 1851 and partially demolished between 2022 and 2025. It was the oldest and longest running factory still in operation in Guimarães until its closure in 2013.

== Nomenclature ==
The name Fábrica do Castanheiro, translated to Factory of the Cork Oak, comes from the plot of land where the factory was built, named Lugar do Castanheiro (Place of the Cork Oak). The origin of this place comes from a big and old Cork Oak that existed there, however, it was cut down at the end of the 20th century by order of the factory's manager at the time, but its wood was preserved.

== History ==
It was founded by António da Costa Guimarães and started operations in 1851 via manual labor despite the firm being officially created in 1854 and rooting back to 1844.

Construction of the current factory began in 1883 and operations commenced in 1885, facilitated by the opening of the nearby train station the year prior. By 1892, the year of Costa Guimarães’ death, the factory had already undergone one substantial expansion, adding new workshops, a chimney, and water tanks, as well as a preliminary layout of working-class housing in front of the site, some of which still stand today. Another structural expansion followed three years later, in 1895.

António da Costa Guimarães participated in many important world fairs using products made at the Castanheiro Factory, including the 1873 Vienna World's Fair and the Centennial Exposition, where it received bronze medals, and the Exposition Universelle of 1878,1889 and 1900, where it received honorable mentions and a silver medal. It also participated in some national fairs, Porto (1857), Braga (1863), Guimarães (1884) and Lisbon (1888).

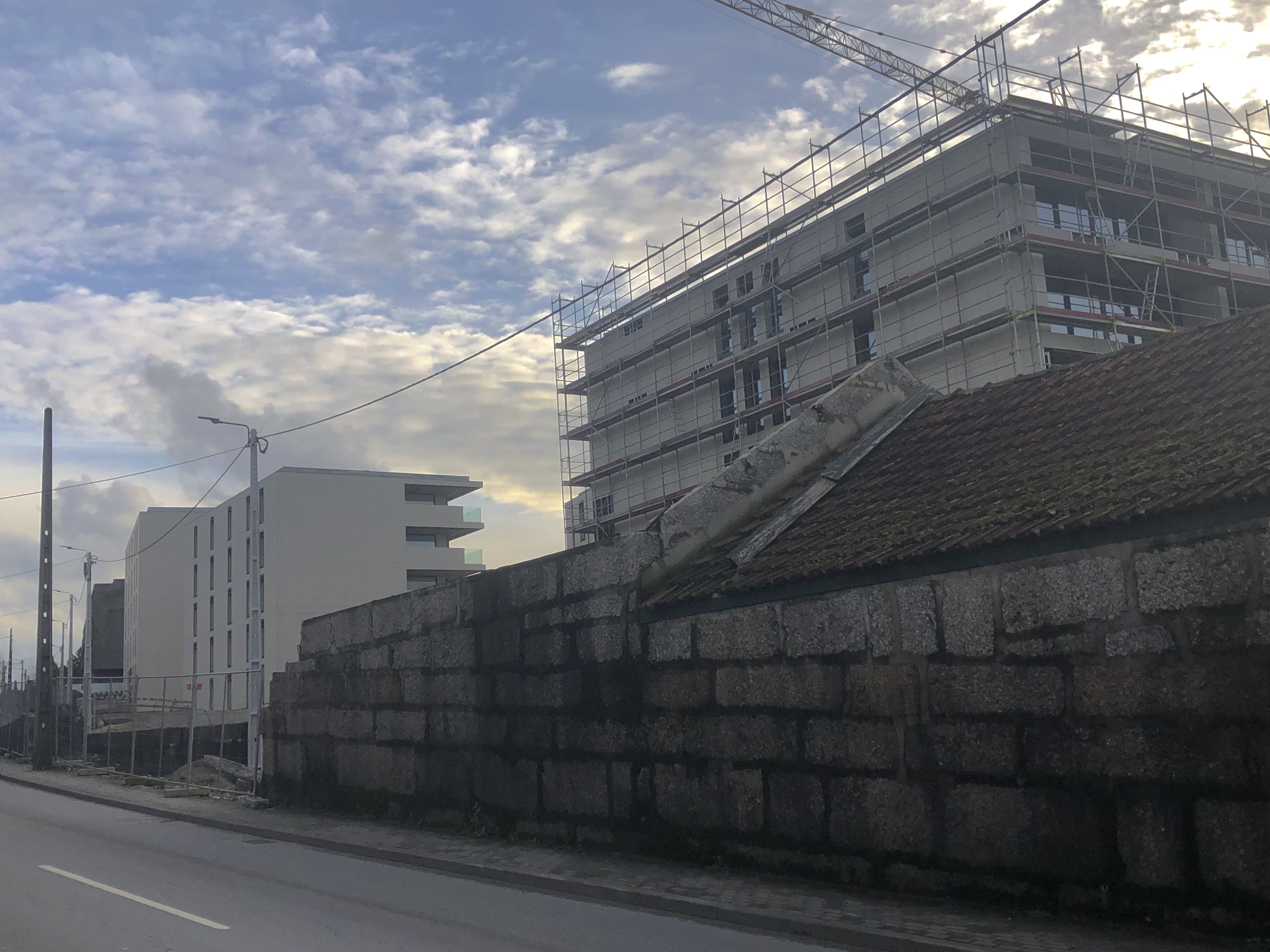
Construction of residential buildings on former factory grounds, January 2024.

The Industrial Surveys of 1891 and 1896 mention that mechanical looms were already in use at the Castanheiro Factory, the first factory in the city to do so. The electrification of the Castanheiro Factory began in 1912 and involved a new phase of expansion, this time to build the transformer cabins, being completed in 1915.

The factory struggled during World War I, as many of its suppliers were German and had to leave the country, while many of its workers were conscripted in the Portuguese Expeditionary Corps to fight at the war front. Despite this, new suppliers were found in France, England and Switzerland, and while the costs increased during this period, so did the profits. This led to a phase of modernization, expansion and specialization in the 1950s.

By May 2019, the company was still in the state of insolvency and had already ceased all activity, a process that began in December 2013 when the Guimarães Court issued the initial insolvency ruling after many attempts of resolving the situation in the previous years, just days before the previous owner, Alberto José Costa, died. That year marked the closure of the Castanheiro Factory, after 127 years of continuous operation. Demolition of the factory started in June 2022 to give place to a "residential complex" that adopted the name of the factory, despite talks about preservation of the older parts of the building by the City Council. The 18 million euro project was unveiled to the public in late 2022, featuring four six/seven story buildings planned for construction atop the section of the factory that, at the time, was already under demolition, and the integration and preservation of the old water tanks and part of the original wall. The buildings were concluded in early 2025.

== See also ==
- Arquinho Factory
- List of buildings and structures in Guimarães
- Economy of Portugal
