= Diogo Cunha =

Portuguese footballer

Personal information
- Full name: Nélson Diogo Freitas Cunha
- Date of birth: 10 February 1986 (age 40)
- Place of birth: Guimarães, Portugal
- Height: 1.70 m (5 ft 7 in)
- Position: Midfielder

Team information
- Current team: Pevidém

Youth career
- 1996–2005: Vitória Guimarães
- 2001–2002: → Amigos Urgeses (loan)

Senior career*
| Years | Team | Apps | (Gls) |
| 2005–2006 | Lixa | 14 | (0) |
| 2006 | Avanca | 1 | (0) |
| 2007 | Olhanense | 4 | (0) |
| 2007−2008 | Mirandela | 14 | (1) |
| 2009−2013 | Feirense | 107 | (12) |
| 2013−2015 | Moreirense | 45 | (6) |
| 2015−2016 | Chaves | 36 | (2) |
| 2016−2018 | Famalicão | 61 | (3) |
| 2018−2021 | Lusitânia | 76 | (13) |
| 2021 | Berço | 4 | (0) |
| 2021−2024 | Valadares Gaia | 71 | (12) |
| 2024−2025 | Espinho | 26 | (2) |
| 2025− | Pevidém | 12 | (2) |
- * Club domestic league appearances and goals as of 22:37, 29 December 2025 (UTC)

Nélson Diogo Freitas Cunha (born 10 February 1986) is a Portuguese professional footballer who plays as a midfielder for Pevidém.

== Club career ==
Born in Guimarães, Cunha was brought up at local Vitória SC, where he spent his entire formative spell save for a loan at neighbouring Amigos de Urgeses. He started his senior career at F.C. Lixa in the third tier, reaching the professionals in the second part of the 2006–07 season with S.C. Olhanense but featuring rarely for the Segunda Liga club.

After one and a half years in the lower leagues with SC Mirandela, Cunha signed for C.D. Feirense in January 2009, helping them to promote to the Primeira Liga in 2011. He made his debut in the competition on 14 August of that year, starting in a 0–0 home draw against C.D. Nacional. He scored his first goal the following 19 February, opening the 1–1 draw with Olhanense also at the Estádio Marcolino de Castro.

Cunha moved to Moreirense F.C. in the summer of 2013, earning promotion to the top flight in his debut campaign as champions. He subsequently renewed his contract for another year.

From 2015 to 2018, Cunha competed in the second tier with G.D. Chaves and F.C. Famalicão, achieving another promotion with the latter. Aged 32, he then took his game to the lower leagues and amateur football.
