= Vila Flor Cultural Centre =

Main cultural centre of Guimarães, Portugal

- Centro Cultural Vila Flor
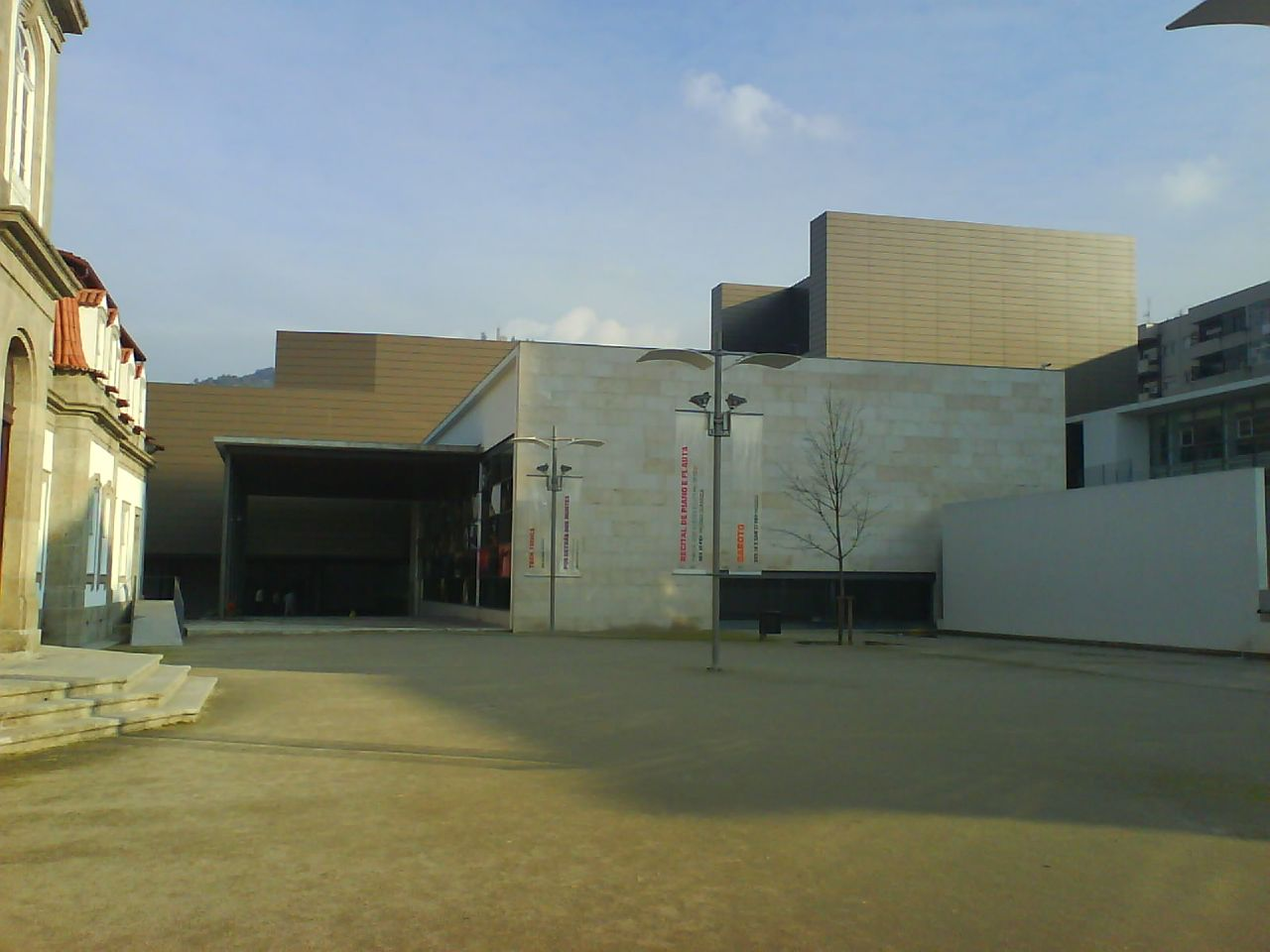
- Vila Flor Cultural Centre in 2007
- Interactive map of the Vila Flor Cultural Centre area
- Alternative names: CCVF (portuguese abbreviation); VFCC (english abbreviation)

General information
- Location: D. Afonso Henriques Avenue, Guimarães, Urgezes, Guimarães, Portugal
- Coordinates: 41°26′13.192″N 8°17′40.645″W
- Completed: September 2005
- Opened: September 2005
- Inaugurated: September 2005

Design and construction
- Architecture firm: Pitagoras Group

Website
- www.ccvf.pt

The Vila Flor Cultural Centre (Portuguese: Centro Cultural Vila Flor), also known as CCVF (English: VFCC), is the most important cultural facility of Guimarães, located on the D. Afonso Henriques Avenue. It is Guimarães's main cultural centre. Completed in September 2005, it was born out of the restoration of the Vila Flor Palace and surrounding spaces, a project by the Pitagoras Group.

== History ==
In 1976, the Guimarães City Council acquired the Vila Flor Palace and its surrounding premises to establish an extension of the Minho University. Later, in 2005, a new complex of buildings designed by the Pitagoras Group, was constructed next to the palace to host a wide range of cultural events. Adopting the name of the neighboring area, the facility became known as the Vila Flor Cultural Centre. It was completed and inaugurated in September of 2005.
