= Oleiros =

Oleiros (Portuguese and Galician for potter) may refer to the following places:

== Portugal ==
- Oleiros, Portugal, a municipality in the district of Castelo Branco
  - A civil parish in the municipality
- Oleiros (Guimarães), a civil parish in the municipality of Guimarães
- A civil parish in the municipality of Ponte da Barca
- A civil parish in the municipality of Vila Verde

== Spain ==
- Oleiros, a municipality in A Coruña, Galicia

== See also ==
- São Paio de Oleiros, a parish in the municipality of Santa Maria da Feira
- Oreiro
