= Caldeiroa Street =

Street in Guimarães, Portugal

- Rua da Caldeirôa (Caldeirôa Street)
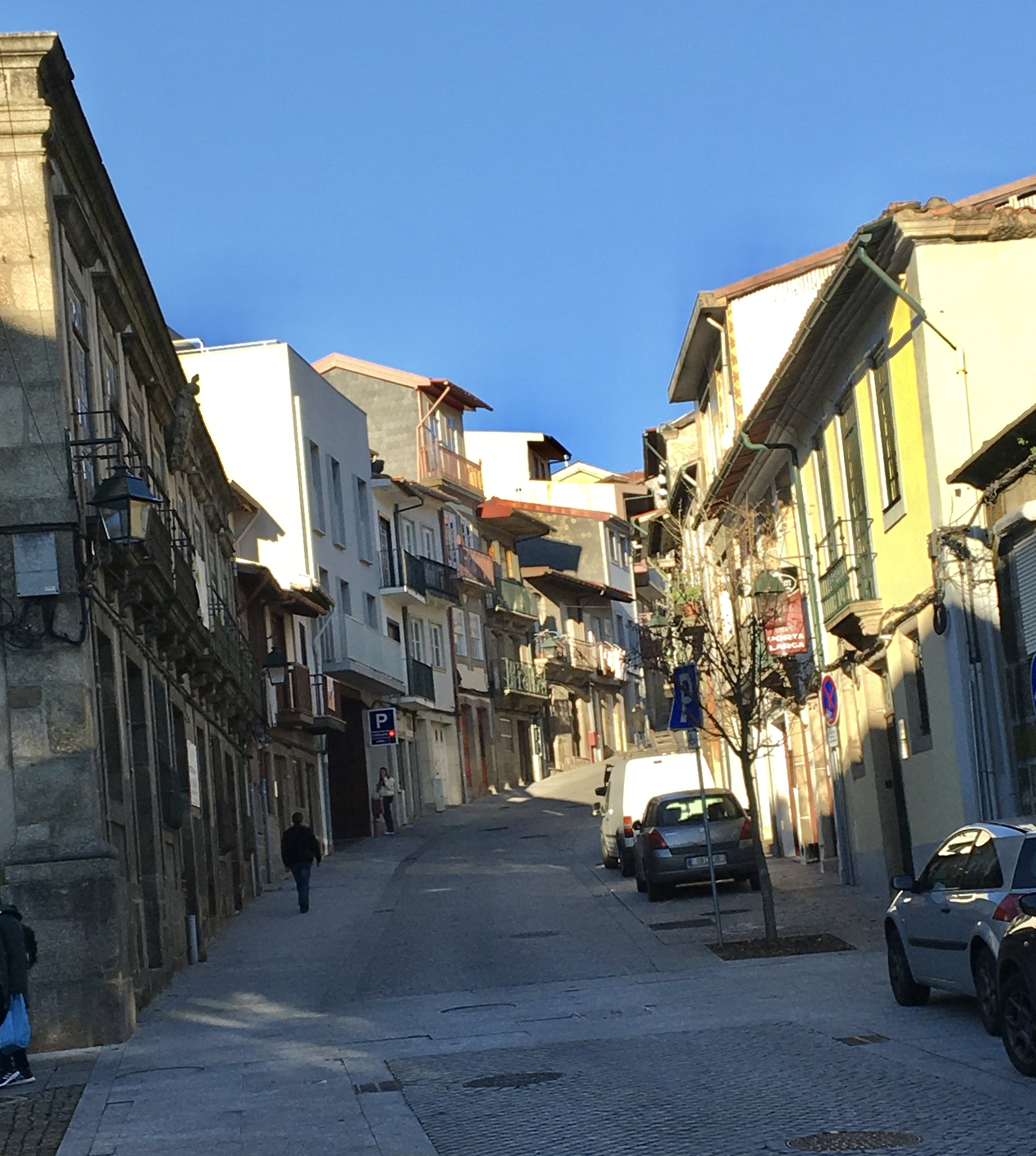
- The Caldeiroa Street in December 2023

- Location within Portugal
- Native name: Rua da Caldeiroa (Portuguese)
- Former name: Rua Dr. Trindade Coelho (1910-1943)
- Part of: Historic Centre of Guimarães
- Type: Industrial and medieval street
- Location: Oliveira, São Paio e São Sebastião and Urgezes, Guimarães, Portugal
- Coordinates: 41.439353°N 8.296432°W

Other
- Status: Preserved

The Caldeiroa Street (Portuguese: Rua da Caldeiroa) is a very important street in the Portuguese city of Guimarães, since it once had a huge part of the city's industry and factories. Its name origin was lost to time.

== Landmarks ==
Along its route there are many notable architectural and cultural testimonies of the past:

- The Arquinho Factory, a now abandoned textile factory, it opened in 1913 and closed its doors in 1991, it will soon house the aerospace engineering sector of the University of Minho.
- House of the Borges Pais do Amaral: Noble house with a coat of arms.
- House of the Lobatos, built in the late 1700s, it was a noble family's house, in 1908 the Banda dos Guises (Guises Band) settled here.
- Casa da Caldeiroa (House of Caldeiroa), a house that is currently being used as refuge to Afghani children following the 2021 Taliban offensive.

== History ==
The first mention to this street dates to 1265. A strip of paper in archaic Portuguese from 1445 also mentions the street: "Rua Caldeiroa, de uma casa latada, anno 1445", which means “Caldeiroa Street, from a large house, year 1445”.

In the 1890s, the Caldeiroa Street's floor was rebuilt with the extra stone that resulted from the demolition of the old church of S. Sebastião, whose bell tower was transplanted to the parish church of Creixomil.

In the early 1940s, a fountain and an oratory were removed from the Caldeiroa Street, where an image of Christ was on display, which, at the time of removal, was handed over to the parish priest of São Sebastião.

The Caldeiroa Street is one of the oldest streets in Guimarães. At the end of 1910, the newly installed Republic changed its name, officially renaming it Rua Dr. Trindade Coelho (Dr. Trindade Coelho Street). But the people, were not happy with the name change and continued to call it by the name they had always known it by. In 1943, the city council once again made the historic name of this old street official, bringing back the name Caldeiroa once more.

In 2020 the pavement of the road was redone and the traffic direction was inverted.
