= Fábrica do Arquinho =

Factory in Guimarães, Portugal

Arquinho Factory
- Fábrica do Arquinho
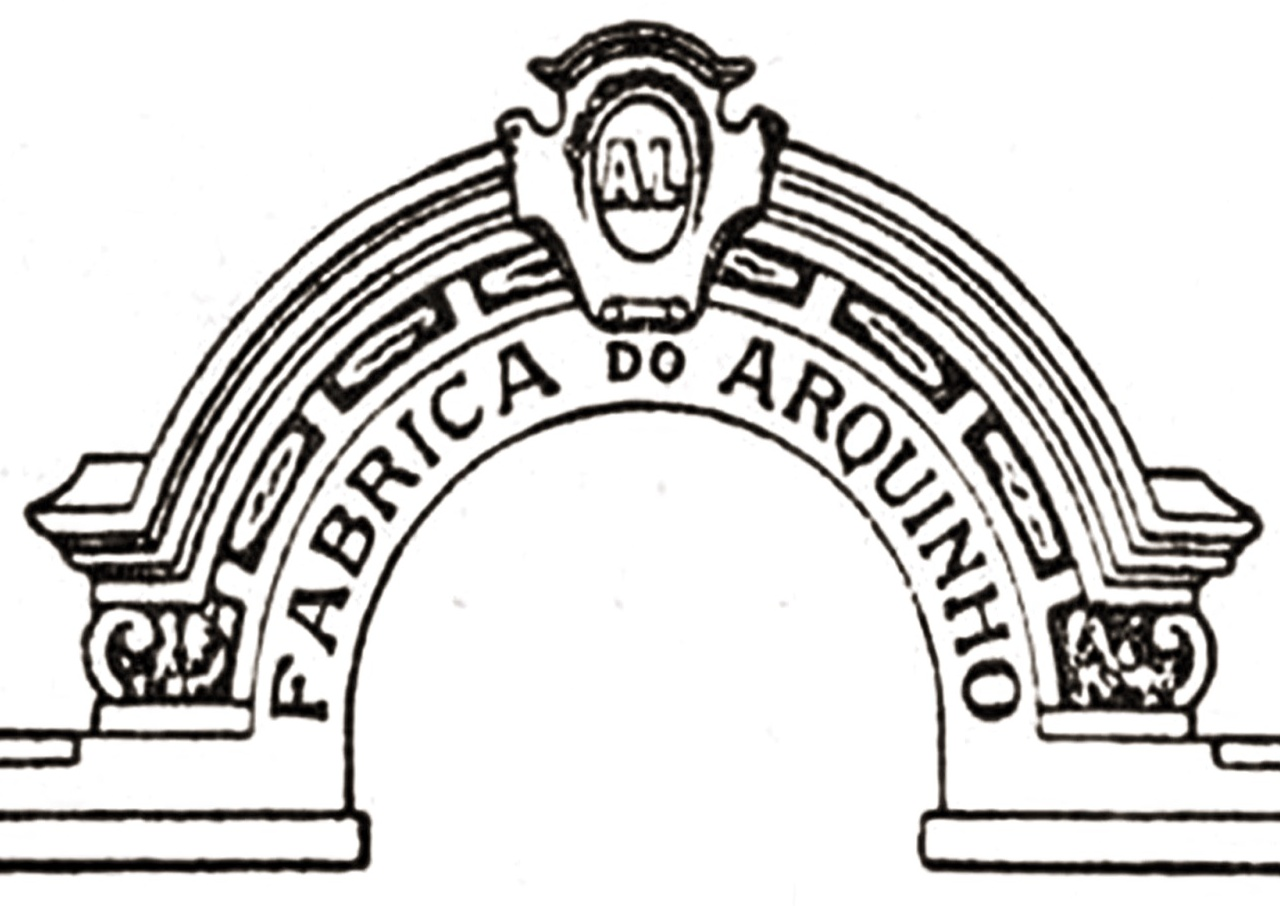
- The factory's logo

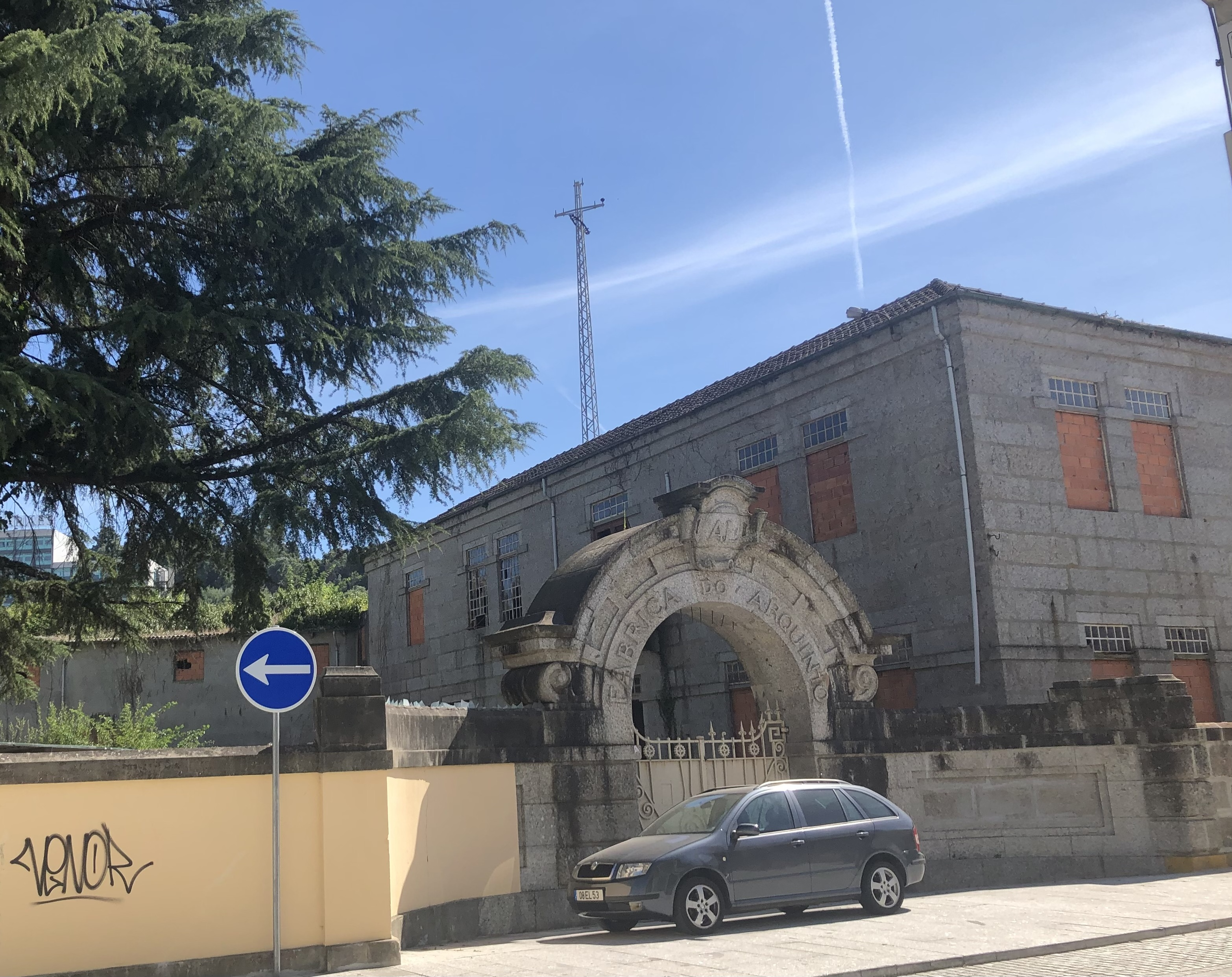
- The Arquinho Factory and its arch, August 2023
- Interactive map of the Arquinho Factory area
- Former names: Fábrica de Fiação e Tecidos do Arquinho

General information
- Status: Abandoned
- Architectural style: Art Deco, Industrial
- Location: Caldeiroa Street, Urgezes, Guimarães, Portugal
- Coordinates: 41°26′18.866″N 8°17′50.725″W
- Elevation: 171 m (561 ft)
- Opened: 1913
- Renovated: Set to be completed by 2026/2027 Started 11 August 2025
- Closed: April 1991
- Landlord: City Council of Guimarães

The Arquinho Factory (Portuguese: Fábrica do Arquinho) was a textile factory located in the Caldeiroa Street, in the freguesia of Urgezes. It was one of the most important factories of Guimarães, and employed hundreds of people for many years up until its closure in the last decade of the 20th century.

== History ==
=== Foundation ===
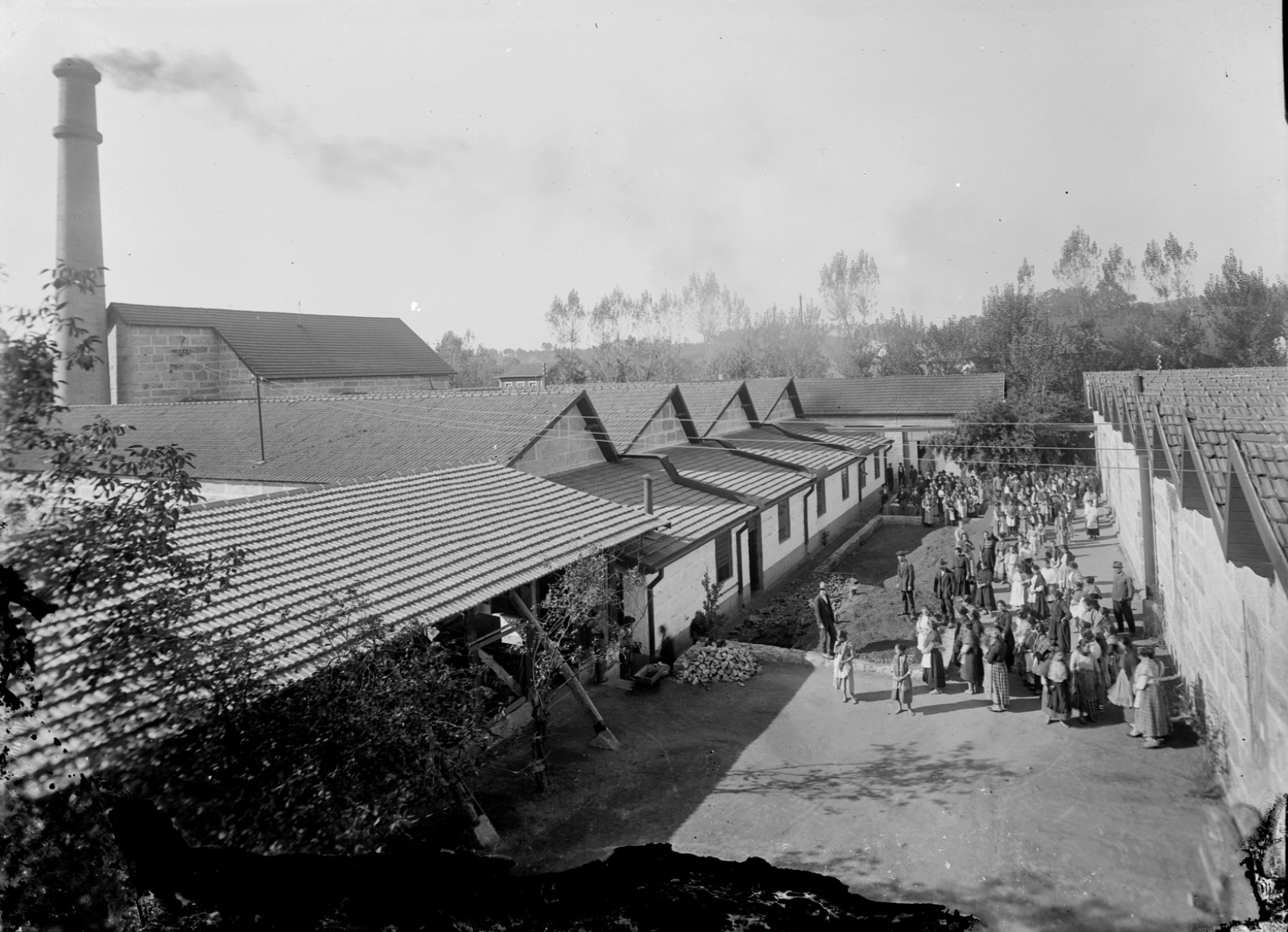
The Arquinho Factory in the 1920s

The Arquinho Factory was founded in 1913 by António José Pereira de Lima and his brother Manuel José Pereira de Lima, two important capitalists of Guimarães at the time, under the name Fábrica de Fiação e Tecidos do Arquinho. It was built on Caldeiroa Street, a heavily industrialized part of the city. This was part of an era of industrialization in Guimarães, with many factories, mainly related to the textile industry, opening around the city, between the end of the 19th century until the 1920s.

=== Development and expansion ===
The factory survived Portugal's involvement in World War I and around the time of the Second World War, the Arquinho Factory had around 160 workers.

It went through many expansions throughout its 70+ years of active existence, compassing many types of architecture and building methods.

=== Closure and abandonment ===
The Arquinho Factory entered in bankruptcy and was closed and abandoned in April 1991.

In 2010 the factory was marked by the PSP as a "drug market", where addicts occupied the complex to deal and consume all types of drugs. In October of that same year, the PSP arrested some trespassers in the factory due to the aforementioned problems.

In June 2011, a substantial fire engulfed the abandoned complex, resulting in the destruction of the roofs of three distinct buildings and worsening the overall deterioration of this historic landmark.

== Rehabilitation and renovation ==
=== Background ===
The factory is considered a historical landmark by the people of Guimarães, and they fear the loss of the industrial patrimony of the city.

The industrial historical patrimony of Guimarães has severely decreased over the last decades. The Castanheiro Factory is being torn down to build an apartment complex, the Avenida Factory was mostly torn down and substituted by a big residential building, the preservation status of the Moinho do Buraco Factory was removed, the Cavalinho Factory was majorly torn down and the Minhoto Factory was completely demolished to build a Mercadona shop and some access roads. The untouched status of the Arquinho Factory amongst these wouldn't last long, as it stayed on a couple hundred meter radius from the others.

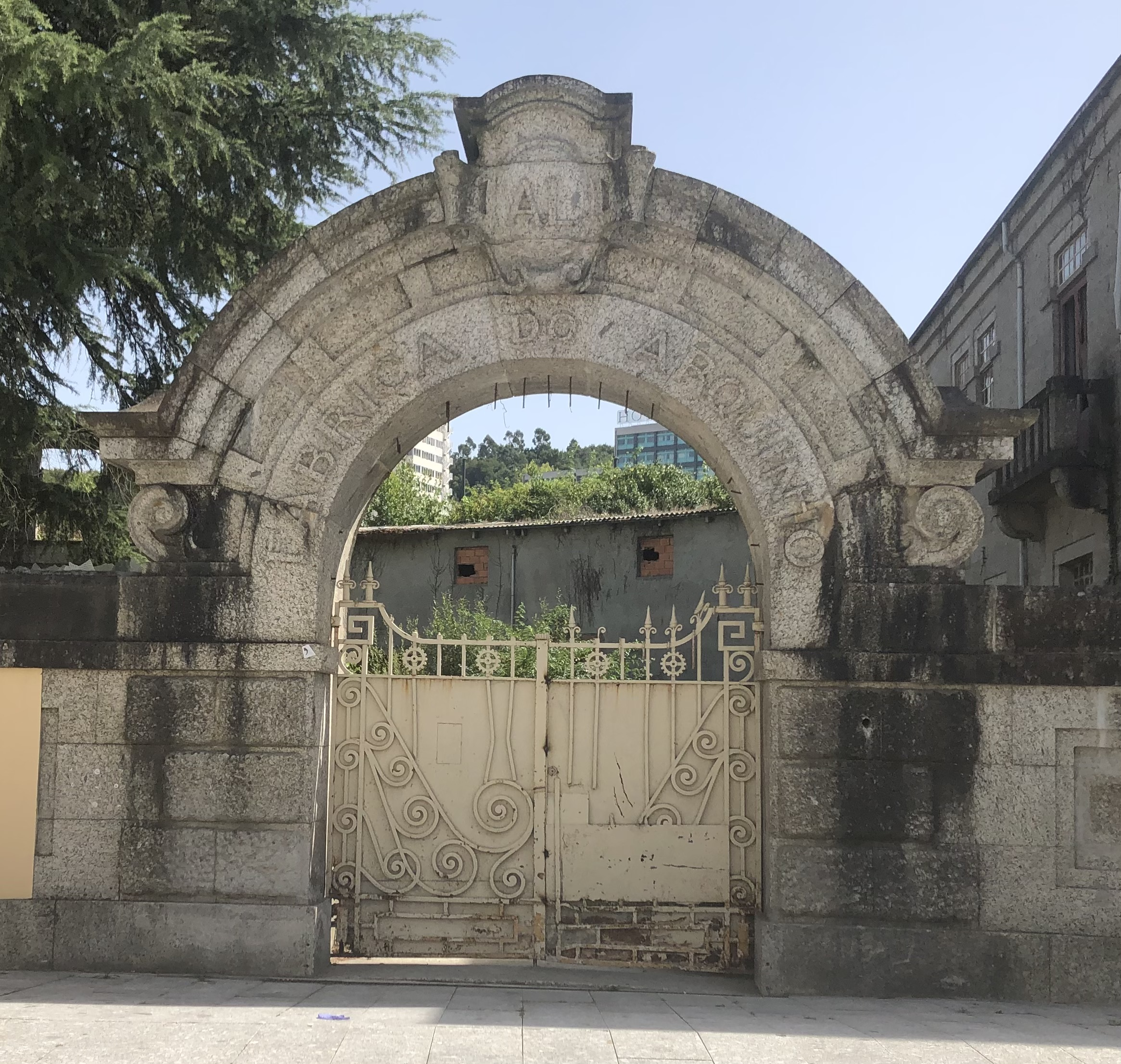
The entrance arch, the one that gave the factory its name (Arquinho=Little arch)

The City Council of Guimarães launched an architectural competition to rehabilitate the Arquinho Factory, which was acquired by the municipality in July 2020. The agreement established between the city council and the property developer specifies that the old factory complex will now be owned by the câmara municipal, costing a total of 1.5 million euros. The ownership fee was settled through the use of "urbanization fees".

=== Planning ===
The first call for tenders for the architectural project was launched in 2022, but was abandoned, and was repeated at the beginning of 2023 with a base bid of 280,000 euros. The winning proposal was from the Porto studio AND-RÉ Architecture.

The new teaching and research complex in Guimarães will be called Tech-G and is intended to house the Aerospace Research Centre, the University of Minho's new curricular commitment, as well as the Fibrenamics spin-off, dedicated to fibers and their derivatives, which is currently based at the Azurém Campus. "It's a promising area and the Arquinho Factory could be the location for this future school," municipal chamber president Domingos Bragança told Guimarães Digital, adding that the Fibrenamics Platform could also extend its research activity in the "field of new materials" to that property.

The renovation, reconstruction and rehabilitation works were expected to be finished by 2025, but that prediction was later pushed to 2026/2027.

=== Rehabilitation ===
Works on the rehabilitation, restoration and demolition officially started on 11 August 2025, with the City Council describing the interventions as “ an enhancement of existing industrial heritage, while adapting it to new teaching and research functions, with a special focus on energy efficiency, sustainability, and the creation of modern conditions to host academic and scientific activities”.

== See also ==
- Economy of Portugal
- Factory
- Industrial Revolution
