= São Faustino =

Parish in Guimarães, Portugal

- Civil parish
- Coat of arms

- Location within Guimarães
- Coordinates: 41°23′20″N 8°16′26″W
- Country: Portugal
- Region: Norte
- Intermunic. comm.: Ave
- District: Braga
- Municipality: Guimarães
- Established: 2025 (re-established)
- Disbanded: 2013

Area
  - Total: 1.96 km^{2} (0.76 sq mi)

Population (2011)
  - Total: 998
  - Density: 509/km^{2} (1,320/sq mi)
- Time zone: UTC+00:00 (WET)
  - Summer (DST): UTC+01:00 (WEST)
- Patron: Saint Faustinus

São Faustino is a Portuguese village in the municipality of Guimarães and the administrative centre of the parish of São Faustino, which covers an area of 1.96 km² and has a population of 998 (2011), giving it a population density of 509.2 inhabitants per km².

== History ==
Until July 2001, it was known as São Faustino de Vizela. Its decision to remain within the municipality of Guimarães, rather than its transfer to the then newly established municipality of Vizela, is thought to have led to this change.

The parish of São Faustino was abolished in 2013 as part of a national administrative reform, so that, together with the parish of Tabuadelo, it could form a new parish called Tabuadelo e São Faustino, with its administrative centre in Tabuadelo. However, on 14 March 2025, the merged parishes were restored to their original status by Law No. 25-A/2025, and so the parish of São Faustino was re-established.

== Population ==
Population of the parish of São Faustino (1864 – 2011)
1864	1878	1890	1900	1911	1920	1930	1940	1950	1960	1970	1981	1991	2001	2011
269	276	354	378	405	415	355	556	628	793	893	945	1 082	1 050	998
