= Leitões =

Extinct parish in Guimarães, Portugal

- Civil parish
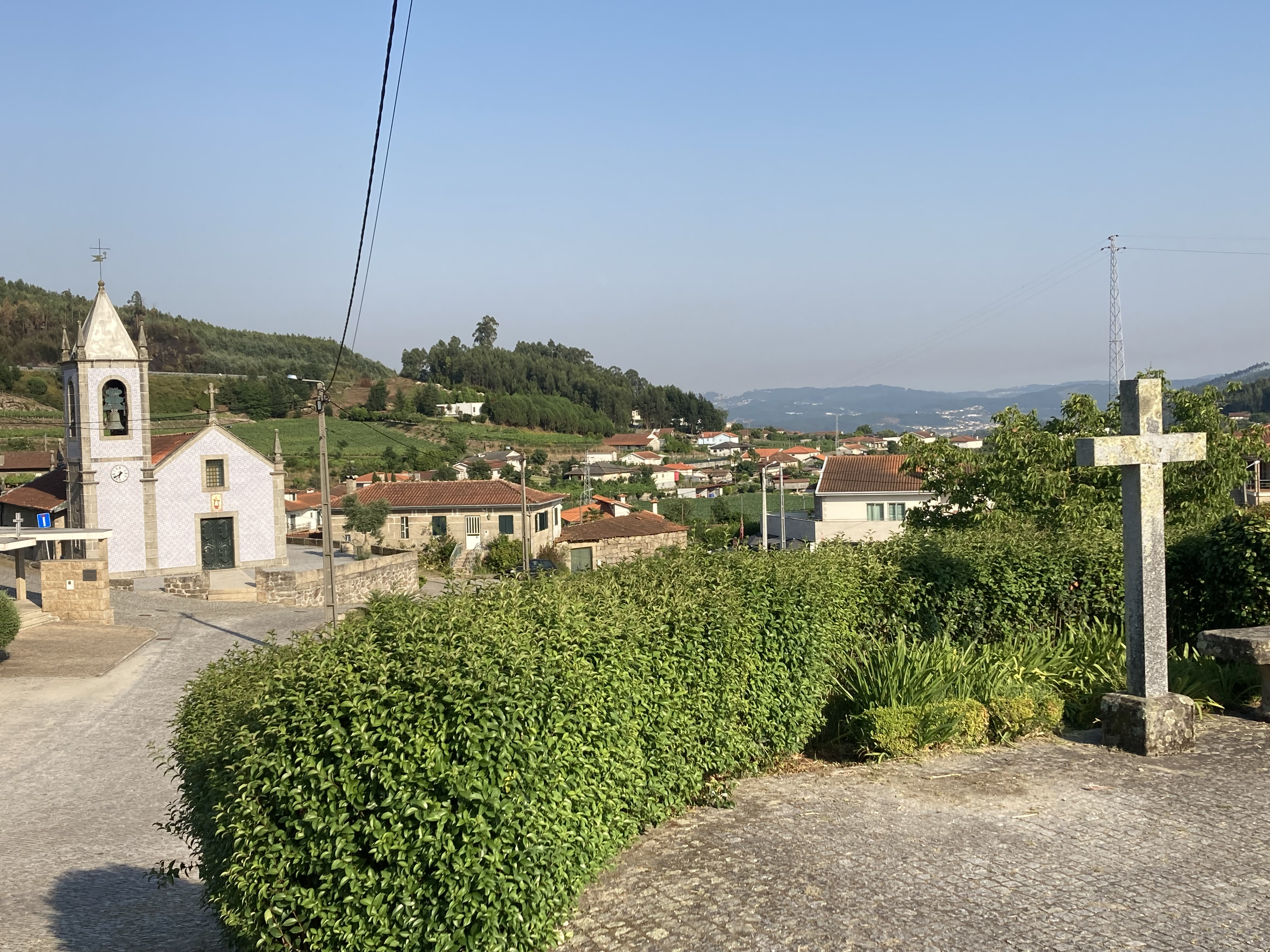
- Leitões in 2022

- Coat of arms

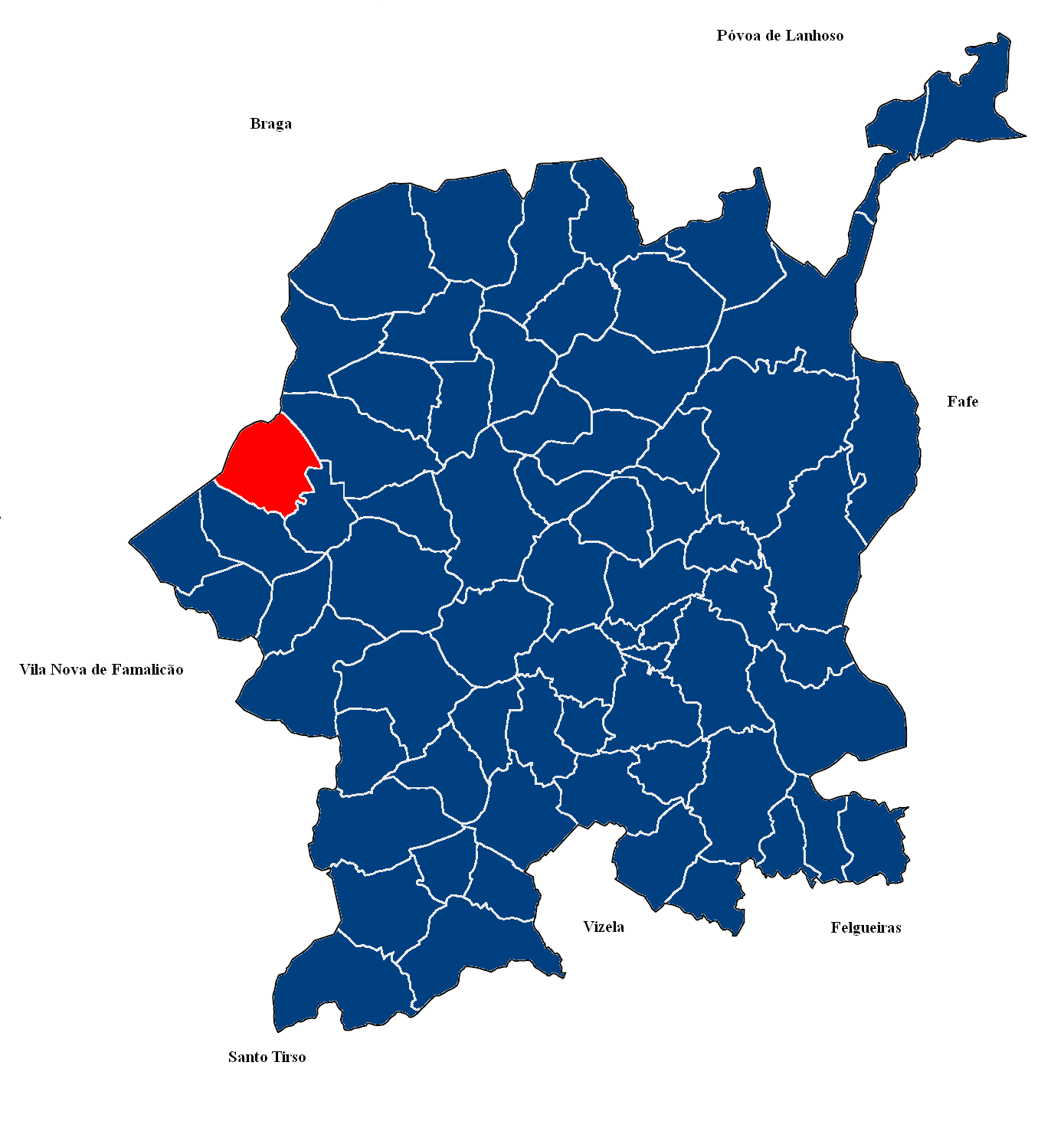
- Location within Guimarães
- Coordinates: 41°28′44″N 8°23′37″W
- Country: Portugal
- Region: Norte
- Intermunic. comm.: Ave
- District: Braga
- Municipality: Guimarães

Area
  - Total: 3.61 km^{2} (1.39 sq mi)

Population (2011)
  - Total: 568
  - Density: 157/km^{2} (408/sq mi)
- Time zone: UTC+00:00 (WET)
  - Summer (DST): UTC+01:00 (WEST)
- Patron: Saint Martin

Leitões is a Portuguese village in the municipality of Guimarães which was the administrative centre of the former parish of Leitões, covering an area of 3.61 km^{2} (1.39 sq mi) and having 568 inhabitants (2011), giving it a population density of 157.3 inhabitants per square kilometre.

The parish of Leitões was abolished in 2013 as part of a national administrative reform, so that, together with the parishes of Oleiros and Figueiredo, it could form a new parish called Leitões, Oleiros e Figueiredo, of which it is the administrative centre.

It is home of the São Bartolomeu hillfort, part of the Castro culture.

== History ==
Leitões dates its origins to pre-Roman times, as evidenced by the presence of the Castro culture, mainly via the São Bartolomeu hillfort.

A document dated to 1059 mentions the place name Portella de Leitones. By the 15th century, the parish was still known as Portela de Leitões.

The parish church, dedicated to Saint Martin, the parish's patron saint, dates from the 18th century and was subsequently enlarged, most notably with the addition of its bell tower. The church contains three altarpieces. Near the church stands the gateway to a former farmstead, bearing the date “1754”. Constructed in granite, the gateway is decorated at the top with a central cross flanked by two pinnacles.

== Population ==
Population of the parish of Leitões (1864 – 2011)
1864	1878	1890	1900	1911	1920	1930	1940	1950	1960	1970	1981	1991	2001	2011
334	390	324	374	378	362	419	444	507	529	514	639	609	588	568
