= Figueiredo (Guimarães) =

Extinct parish in Guimarães, Portugal

- Civil parish
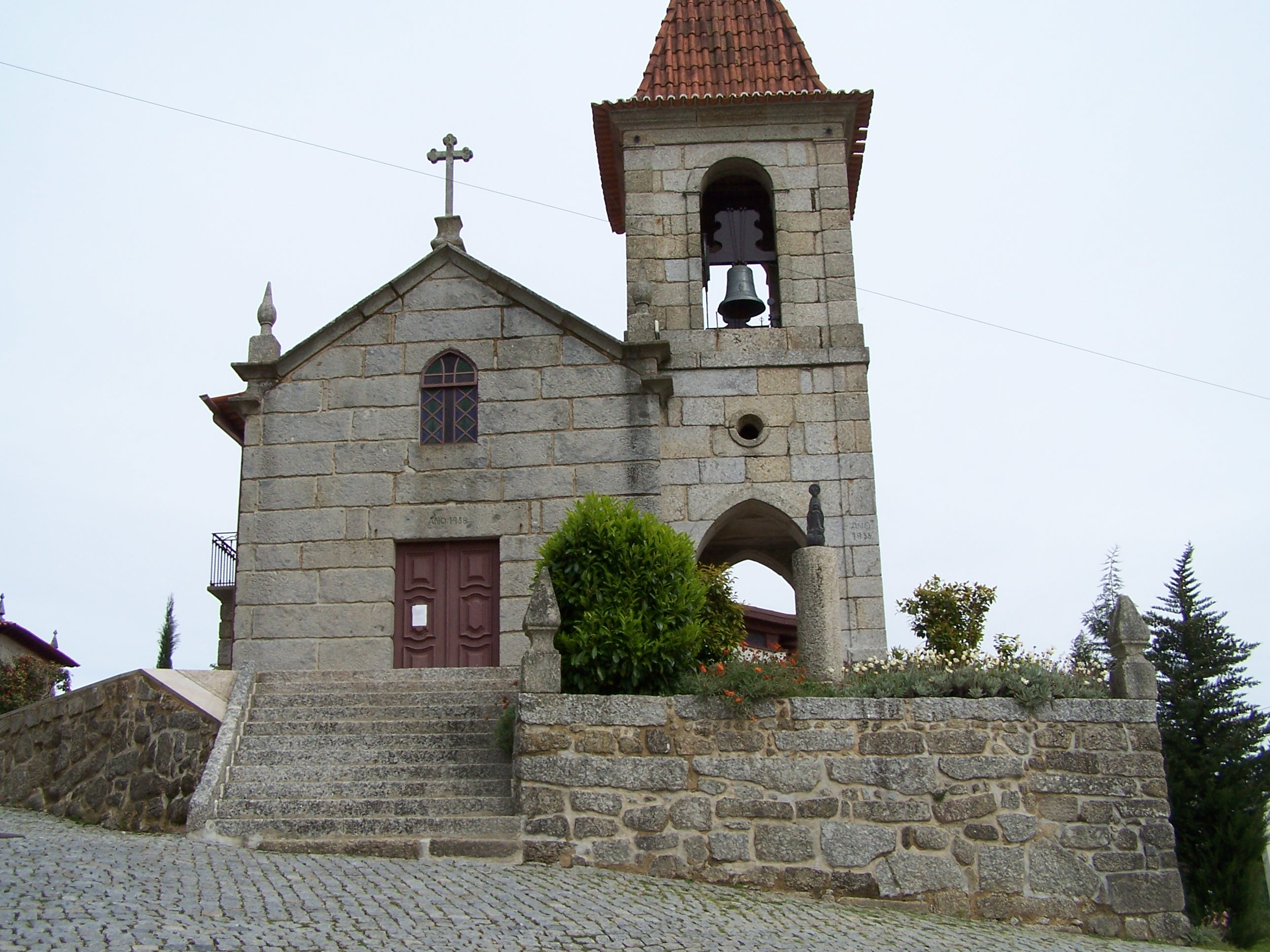
- The church of Figueiredo in 2009

- Coat of arms

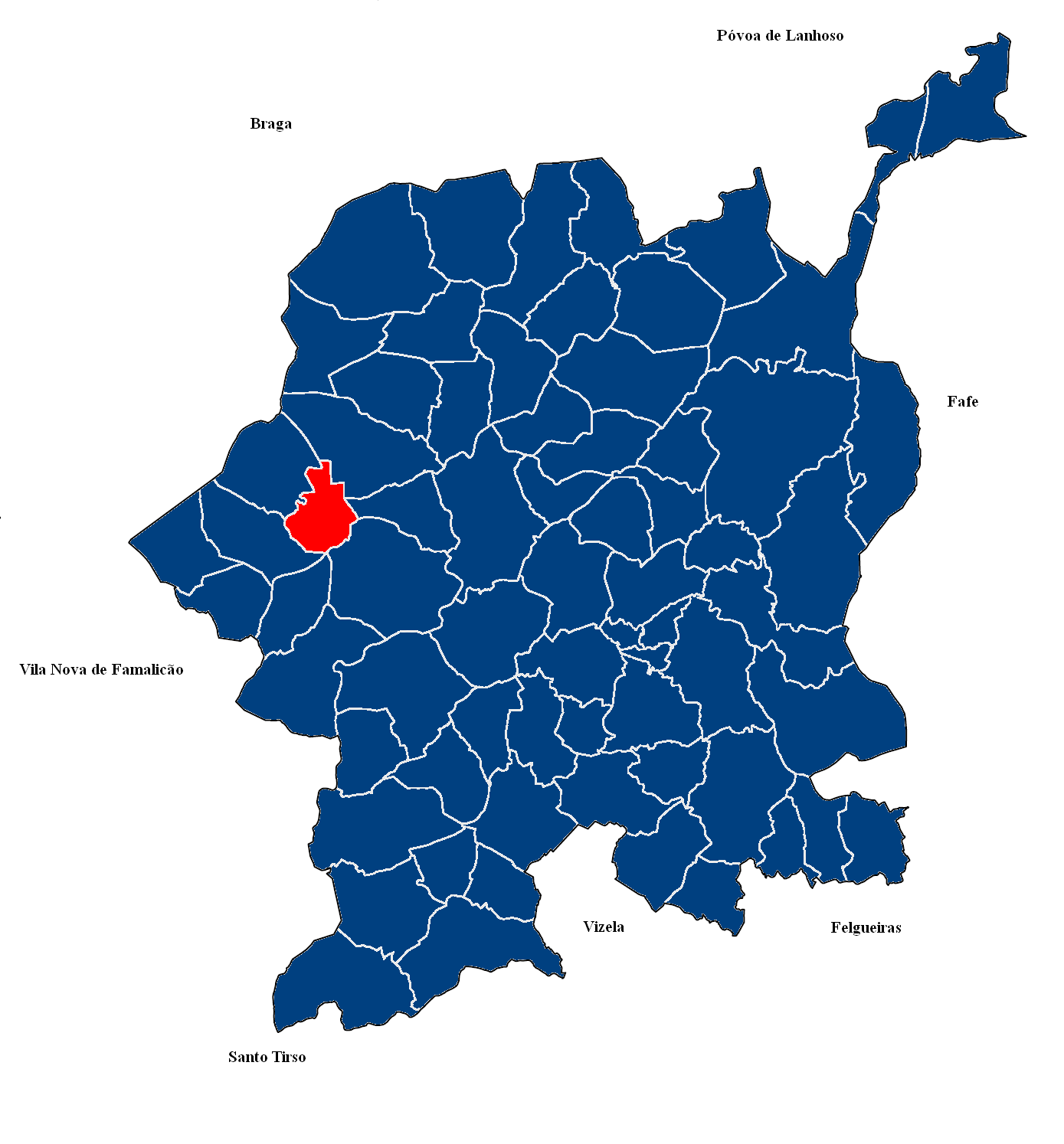
- Location within Guimarães
- Coordinates: 41°28′12″N 8°22′58″W
- Country: Portugal
- Region: Norte
- Intermunic. comm.: Ave
- District: Braga
- Municipality: Guimarães

Area
  - Total: 2.06 km^{2} (0.80 sq mi)

Population (2011)
  - Total: 436
  - Density: 212/km^{2} (548/sq mi)
- Time zone: UTC+00:00 (WET)
  - Summer (DST): UTC+01:00 (WEST)
- Patron: Saint Pelagius

Figueiredo is a Portuguese village in the municipality of Guimarães which was the administrative centre of the former parish of Figueiredo, covering an area of 2.06 km^{2} (0.80 sq mi) with a population of 436 (2011), giving it a population density of 211.7 inhabitants per km².

It was abolished in 2013 as part of a national administrative reform, so that, together with the parishes of Leitões and Oleiros, it could form a new parish called Leitões, Oleiros e Figueiredo, with its administrative centre of it being in Leitões.

The name Figueiredo derives from Figaretum, Figueyreto and then, Figueireto. Therefore, Figueiredo is a settlement with many centuries of history, which was founded sometime before the year 924, the date of the earliest document in which it is stated that Figueiredo was not a parish, but a place that belonged to Paçô, now part of Oleiros. Sãmoça and Serrado are two Arabic names that still survive in part in Figueiredo, and which trace the town’s history back to the period of Arab occupation, during which the Arabs are believed to have lived here for a long time. A notable feature of Figueiredo’s heritage is the Calvário, which contains a stone altar and is commonly known as Senhor da Anta, being built in the 16th century.

== Population ==
Population of the parish of Figueiredo (1864 – 2011)
1864	1878	1890	1900	1911	1920	1930	1940	1950	1960	1970	1981	1991	2001	2011
240	246	257	269	284	261	248	282	343	376	385	439	461	484	436
