= Tabuadelo =

Parish in Guimarães, Portugal

- Civil parish
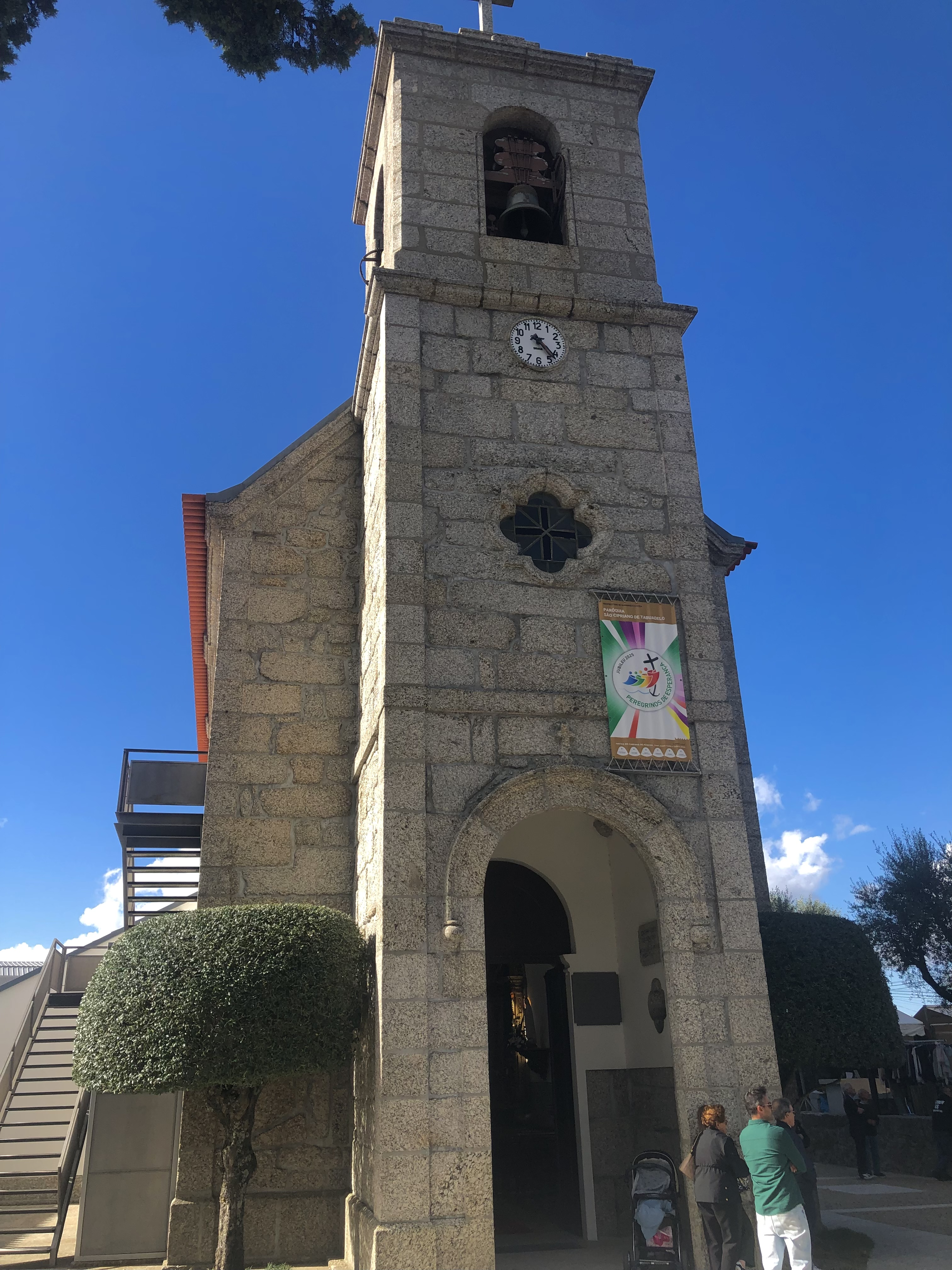
- Church of Tabuadelo in 2025

- Coat of arms

- Location within Guimarães
- Coordinates: 41°24′1″N 8°17′27″W
- Country: Portugal
- Region: Norte
- Intermunic. comm.: Ave
- District: Braga
- Municipality: Guimarães
- Established: 2025 (re-established)
- Disbanded: 2013

Area
  - Total: 3.09 km^{2} (1.19 sq mi)

Population (2011)
  - Total: 1,555
  - Density: 503/km^{2} (1,300/sq mi)
- Time zone: UTC+00:00 (WET)
  - Summer (DST): UTC+01:00 (WEST)
- Patron: Saint Cyprian

Tabuadelo is a Portuguese village in the municipality of Guimarães and the administrative centre of the parish of Tabuadelo, which covers an area of 3.09 km^{2} (1.19 sq mi) and has a population of 1555 (2011), giving it a population density of 503.2 inhabitants per km².

The parish of Tabuadelo was abolished in 2013 as part of a national administrative reform, so that, together with the parish of São Faustino, it could form a new parish called Tabuadelo e São Faustino, with its administrative centre in Tabuadelo. However, on 14 March 2025, the merged parishes were restored to their original status by Law No. 25-A/2025, and the parish of Tabuadelo was thus re-established.

Its situated about 6 kilometres from the city centre of Guimarães and much of its economic strength lies in industry and services.

The Palace of São Cipriano is located here, a palace dating from around 1415 which provided shelter for pilgrims on the Caminho de Santiago.

== Population ==
Population of the parish of Tabuadelo (1864 – 2011)
1864	1878	1890	1900	1911	1920	1930	1940	1950	1960	1970	1981	1991	2001	2011
338	319	319	327	349	315	343	447	553	639	887	1 305	1 562	1 723	1 555
