= Vila Flor Palace =

Palace in Guimarães, Portugal

- Palácio Vila Flor
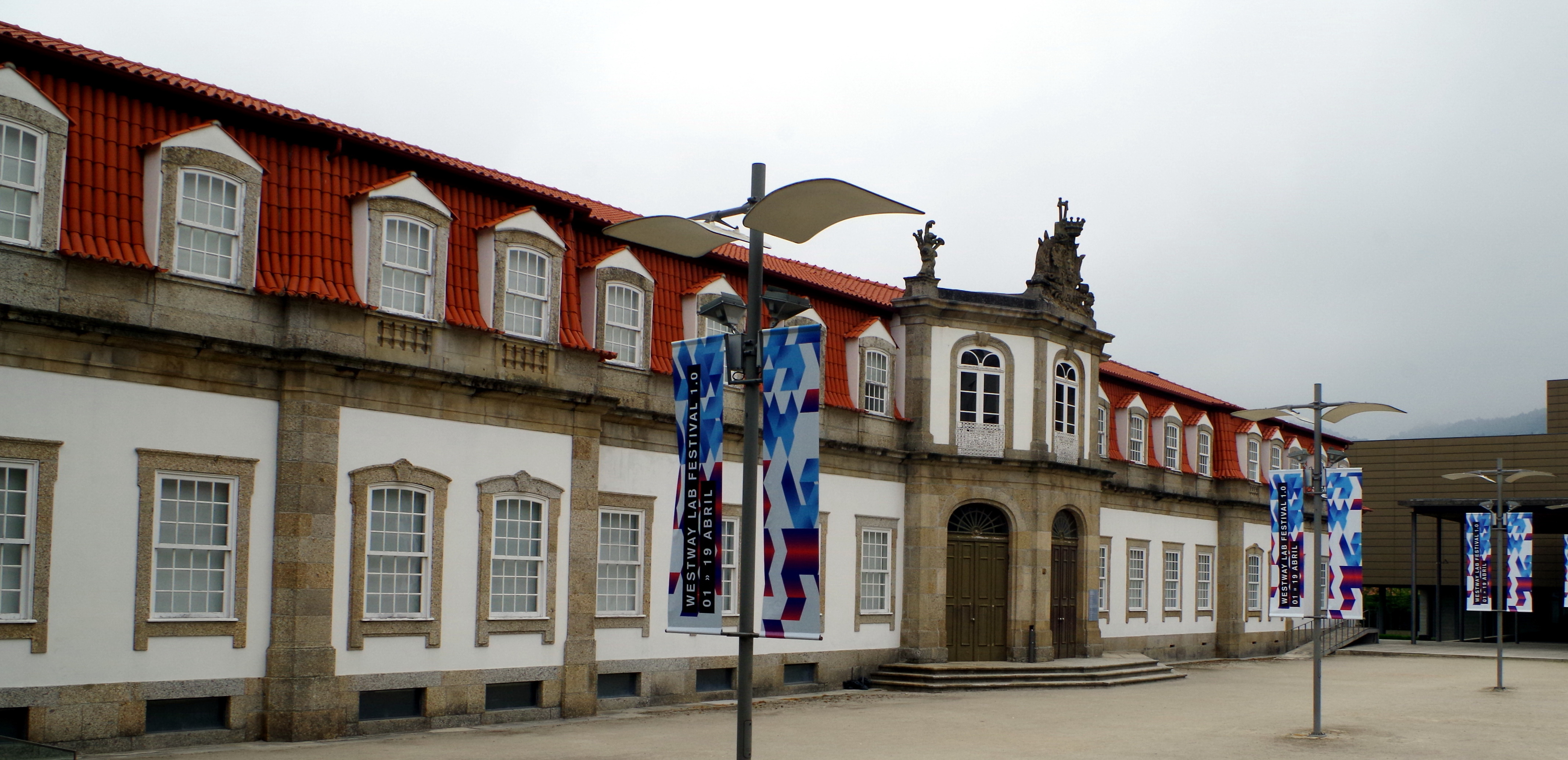
- Side view of the Palace’s front
- Interactive map of the Vila Flor Palace area
- Alternative names: Palace of Vila Flor (en); Palácio de Vila Flor (pt)

General information
- Status: Restored (2005)
- Location: Urgezes, Guimarães, Portugal
- Coordinates: 41°26′14.12″N 8°17′41.93″W

Design and construction
- Awards and prizes: Honourable Mention in the National Landscape Architecture Award in the category of Outdoor Spaces for Public Use

The Vila Flor Palace is an 18th-century palace and an important cultural hotspot of the city of Guimarães, Portugal.

== History ==
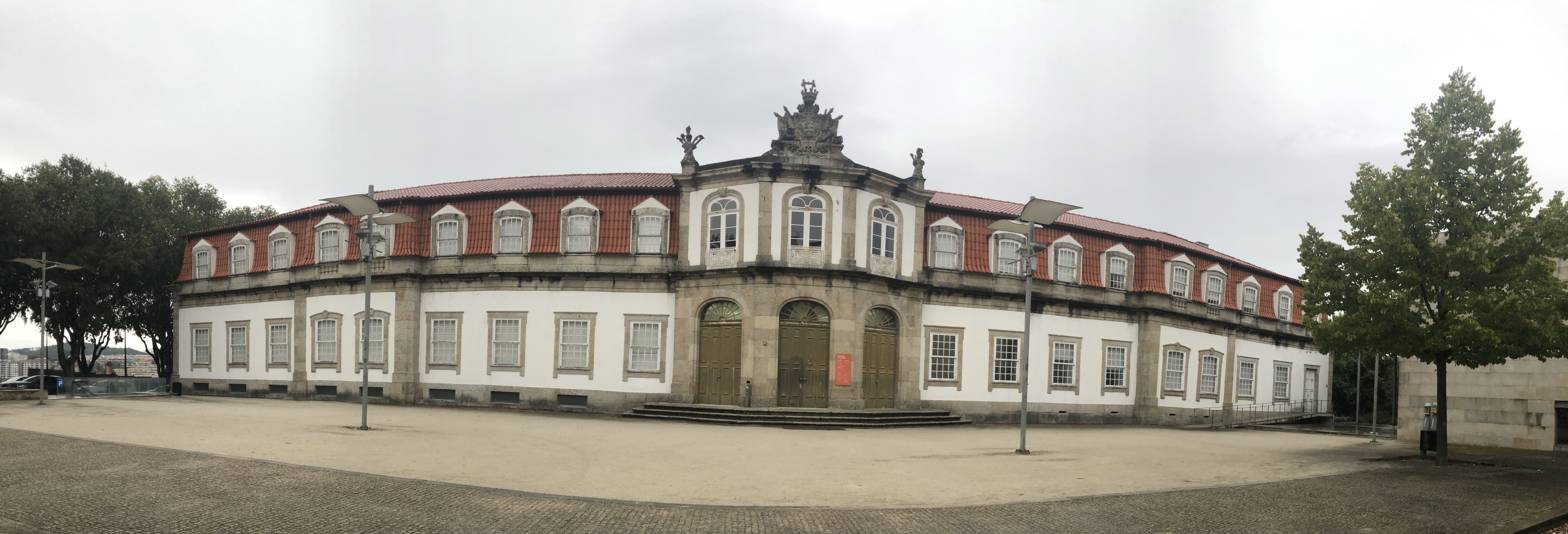
Panorama view of the palace's front facade in 2023

It was built in the 18th century at the behest of the nobleman Tadeu Luís António Lopes de Carvalho de Fonseca e Camões and it was here that the celebrations commemorating the acclamation of King José I took place in 1750. The palace later passed to the Jordão family, who completed the work begun by Tadeu Luís.

The first Count of Arrochela acquired the palace and, in 1853, Queen Maria II stayed here and, by decree of 23 June of the same year, she elevated the town of Guimarães to the status of a city.

In 1884, the Vila Flor Palace hosted the "1st Industrial and Commercial Exhibition of Guimarães". This exhibition was a remarkable event and a demonstration of the city's economic vitality, at a time when Guimarães was beginning to build its future. At the beginning of the 20th century, the building was acquired by the Jordão family from Guimarães, who completed the construction of the north wing of the Palace. In 1976, the palace was already in a state of disrepair and was acquired by Guimarães City Council to house the first Guimarães Centre of the University of Minho's Faculty of Engineering. In the meantime, the University of Minho inaugurated the new University Centre building in Guimarães on the Azurém Campus and the Palace was temporarily closed.

In the first decade of the 2000s, Guimarães City Council decided to completely restore the Vila Flor Palace and gardens and include in the new project a Cultural Centre of the same name, built from scratch to hold shows and concerts, which coexists with the 18th century Baroque palace. The restoration work was completed in 2005.

=== Gardens ===
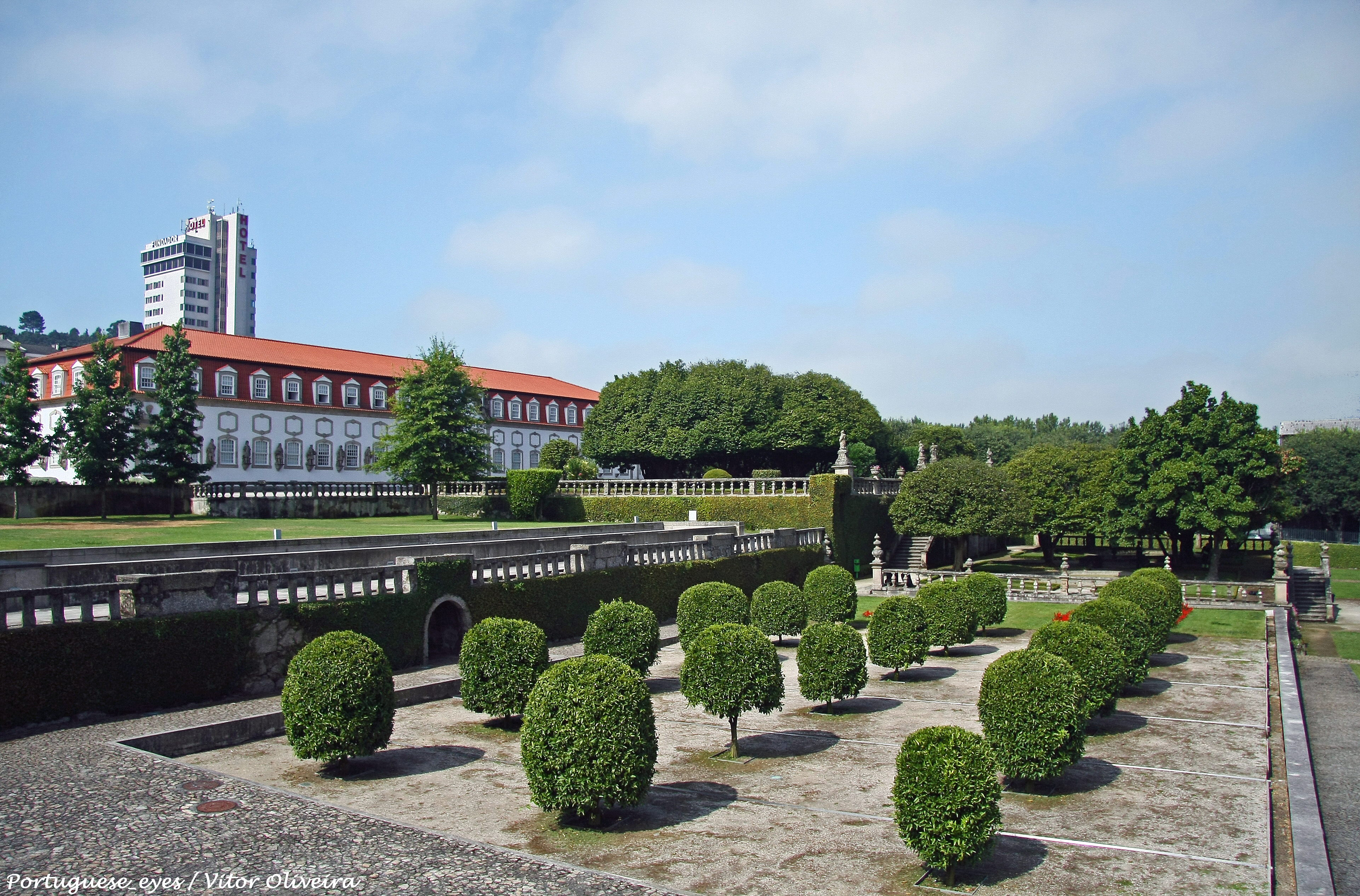
Small part of the gardens

The boxwood gardens of the Vila Flor Palace, with a privileged view over the city of Guimarães and its monuments, such as the Paço dos Duques and Guimarães Castle, were the venue for important events, such as the celebrations commemorating the acclamation of King José I in 1750. After the Palace was bought by Guimarães City Council, part of the gardens were used as a municipal vegetable garden.

The beautiful gardens, built on terraces, have been restored, keeping the boxwoods intact, the tree species (especially the camellias, the fountains and the sculptures) and an area has been added to the green zone to host open-air events. In 2006, it received an Honourable Mention in the National Landscape Architecture Award in the category of Outdoor Spaces for Public Use. The space also houses a restaurant and a café-concert centre.
