= Amigos de Urgeses =

Portuguese sports club from Guimarães

GDR Amigos de Urgeses is a Portuguese sports team from Urgezes, in Guimarães, Portugal.

It is a very well known team in the Braga district, and has an important work with social affairs in the city of Guimarães, also being a cultural promoter.
