= Airão Santa Maria, Airão São João e Vermil =

Former parish in Guimarães, Portugal

- Civil parish
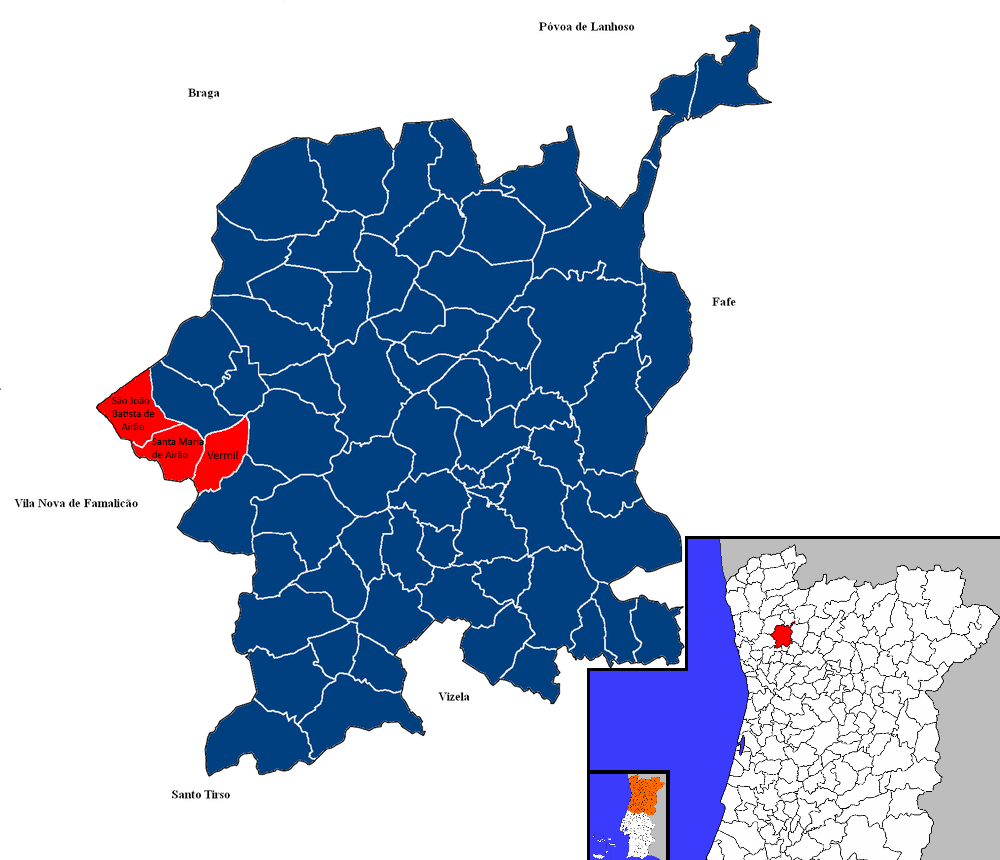
- Coordinates: 41.45135°N 8.40549°W
- Country: Portugal
- Region: Norte
- Intermunic. comm.: Ave
- District: Braga
- Municipality: Guimarães
- Established: 2013
- Disbanded: 13 March 2025

Area
  - Total: 7.48 km^{2} (2.89 sq mi)

Population (2021)
  - Total: 3,213
  - Density: 430/km^{2} (1,110/sq mi)
- Time zone: UTC+00:00 (WET)
  - Summer (DST): UTC+01:00 (WEST)
- Website: https://www.freguesias-lof.pt/pt/

Airão Santa Maria, Airão São João e Vermil (officially: União das Freguesias de Airão Santa Maria, Airão São João e Vermil) was a civil parish in the municipality of Guimarães, Portugal. It was formed in 2013 by the merger of the parishes of Airão (Santa Maria), Airão (São João Baptista) and Vermil, and dissolved on 13 March 2025, restoring the original parishes. The population in 2021 was 3213, in an area of 7.48 km^{2}.

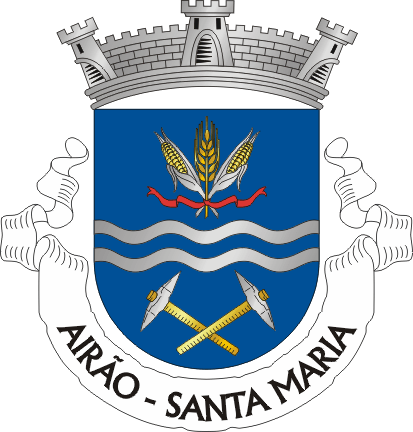
Santa Maria de Airão Coat of Arms

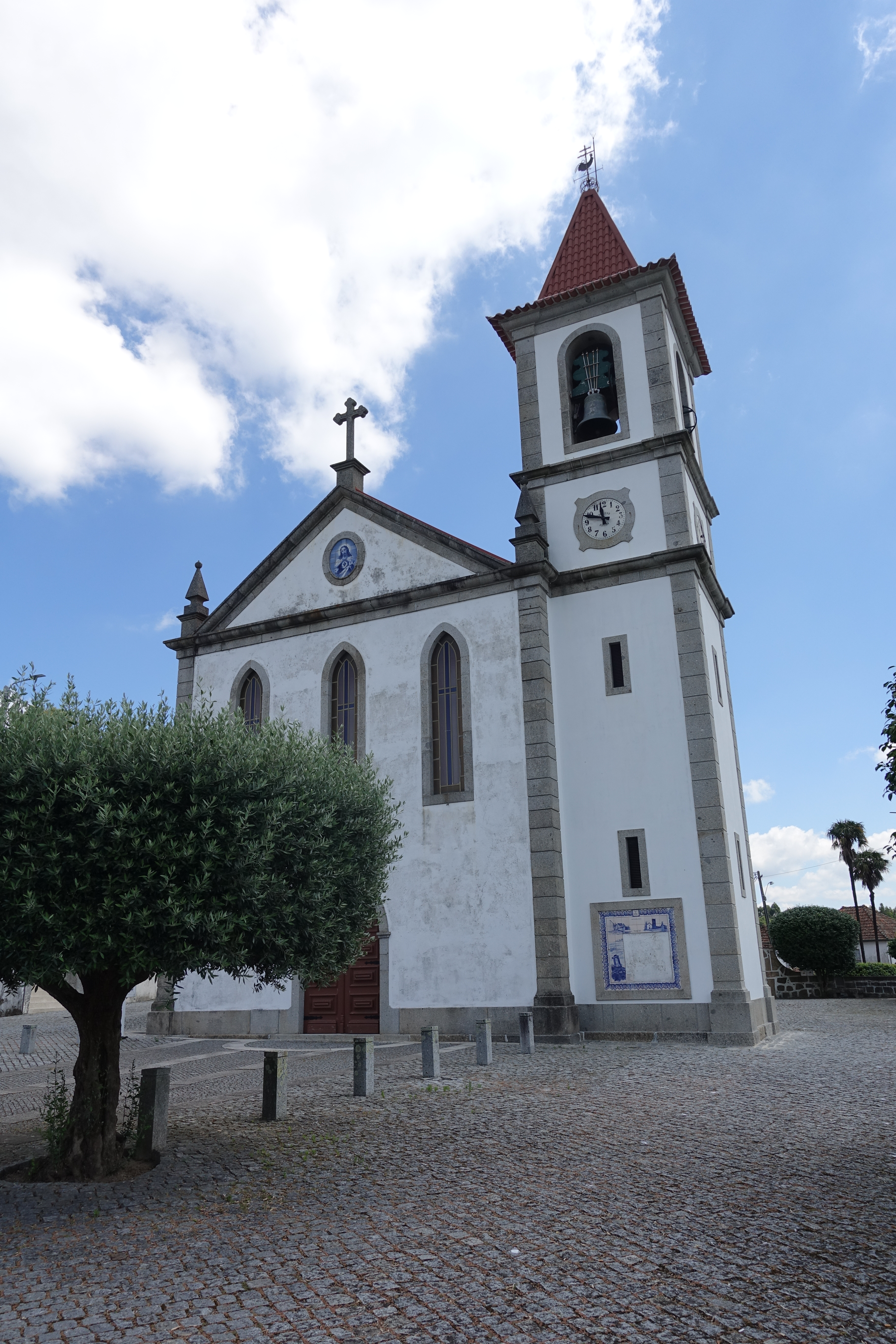
Vermil Church
