= Atães e Rendufe =

- Civil parish
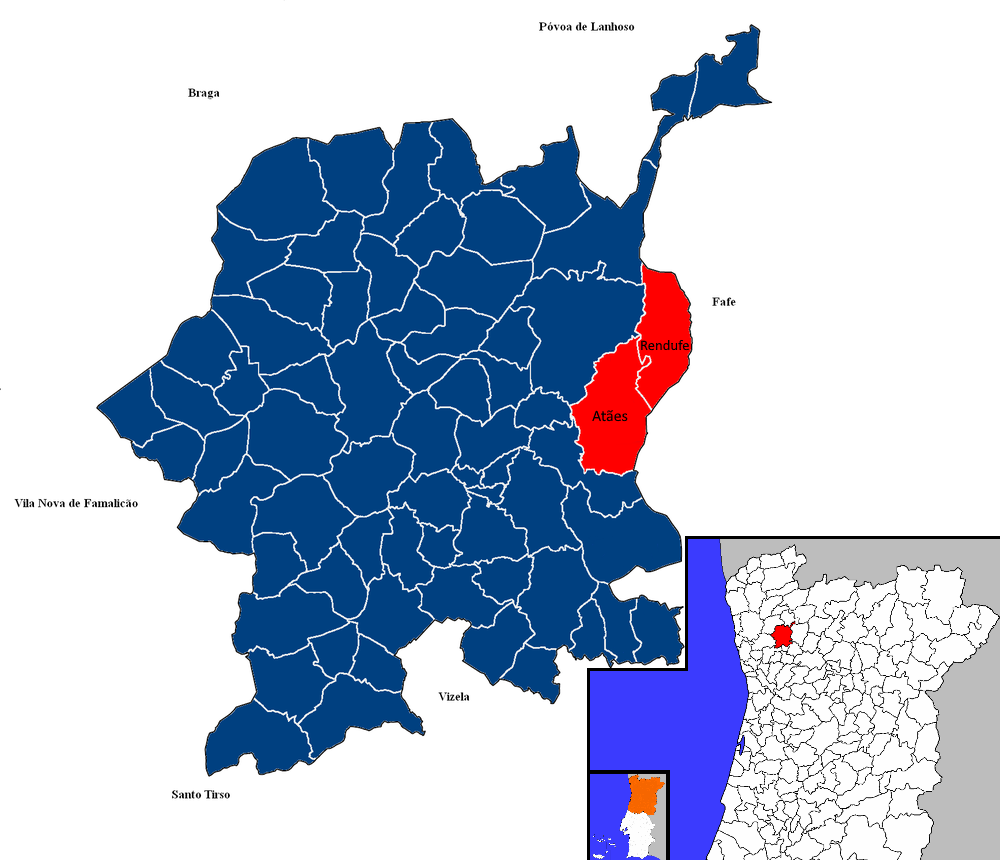
- Coordinates: 41.467°N 8.245°W
- Country: Portugal
- Region: Norte
- Intermunic. comm.: Ave
- District: Braga
- Municipality: Guimarães

Area
  - Total: 12.09 km^{2} (4.67 sq mi)

Population (2021)
  - Total: 2,580
  - Density: 213/km^{2} (553/sq mi)
- Time zone: UTC+00:00 (WET)
  - Summer (DST): UTC+01:00 (WEST)

Atães e Rendufe (officially: União das Freguesias de Atães e Rendufe) is a freguesia (civil parish) in the municipality of Guimarães, Portugal. It was formed in 2013 by the merger of the former parishes Atães and Rendufe. The population in 2021 was 2,580, in an area of 12.09 square kilometres (4.67 sq mi).

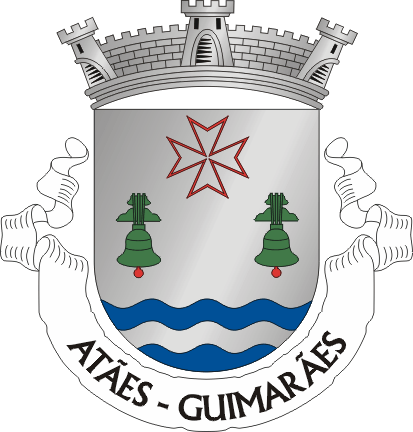
Atães coat of arms
