= Leitões, Oleiros e Figueiredo =

- Civil parish
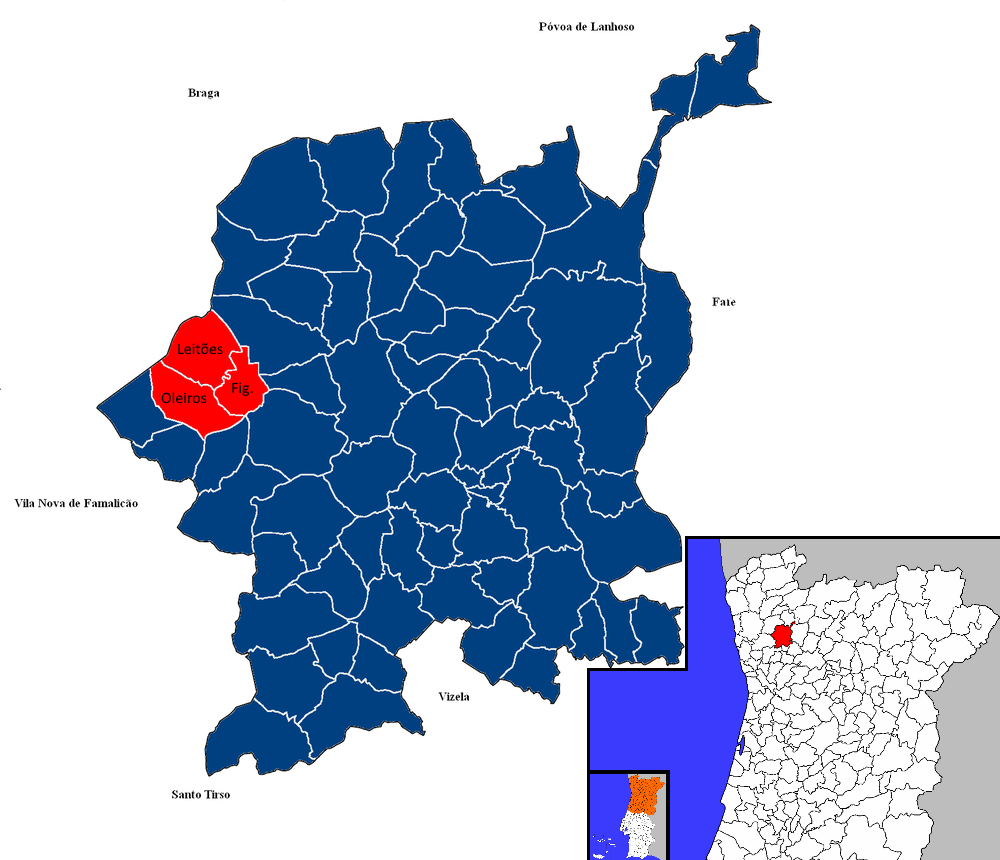
- Coordinates: 41.468°N 8.392°W
- Country: Portugal
- Region: Norte
- Intermunic. comm.: Ave
- District: Braga
- Municipality: Guimarães

Area
  - Total: 8.98 km^{2} (3.47 sq mi)

Population (2021)
  - Total: 1,437
  - Density: 160/km^{2} (414/sq mi)
- Time zone: UTC+00:00 (WET)
  - Summer (DST): UTC+01:00 (WEST)
- Website: https://www.freguesias-lof.pt/pt/

Leitões, Oleiros e Figueiredo (officially: União das Freguesias de Leitões, Oleiros e Figueiredo) is a civil parish in the municipality of Guimarães, Portugal. It was formed in 2013 by the merger of the former parishes Leitões, Oleiros, and Figueiredo. The population in 2021 was 1,437, in an area of 8.98 km^{2}.

== Gallery ==
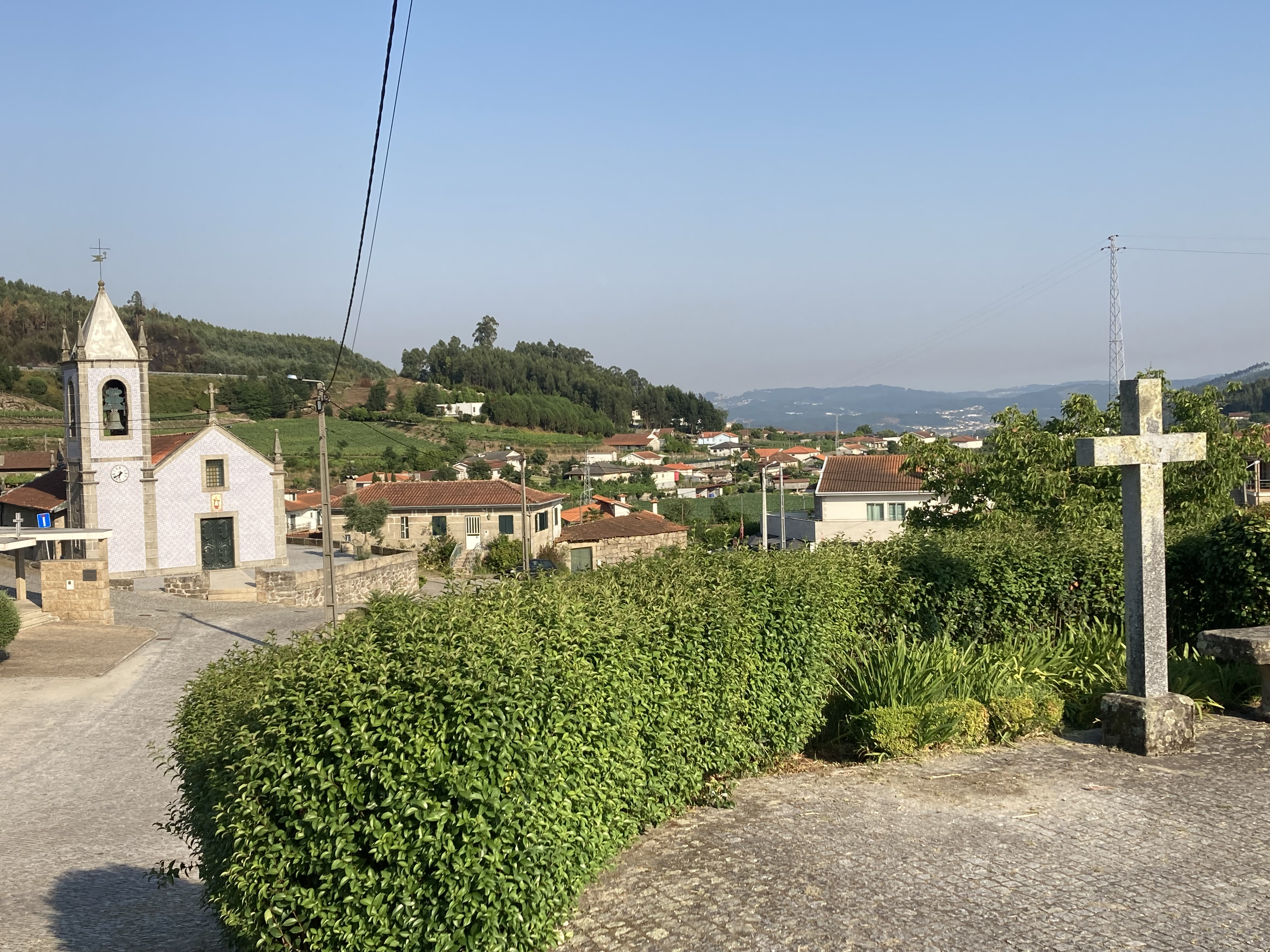
Leitões

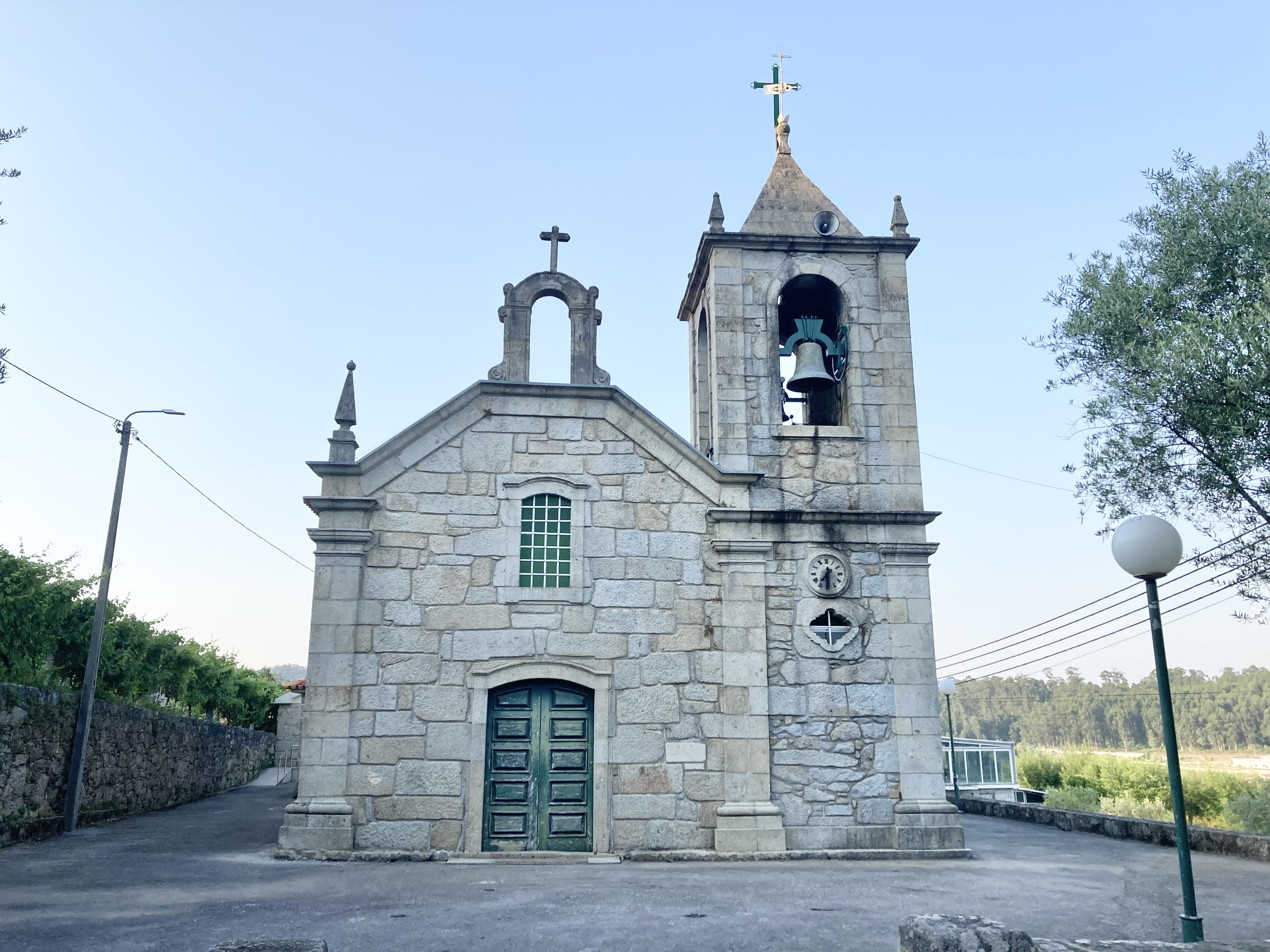
Oleiros Church

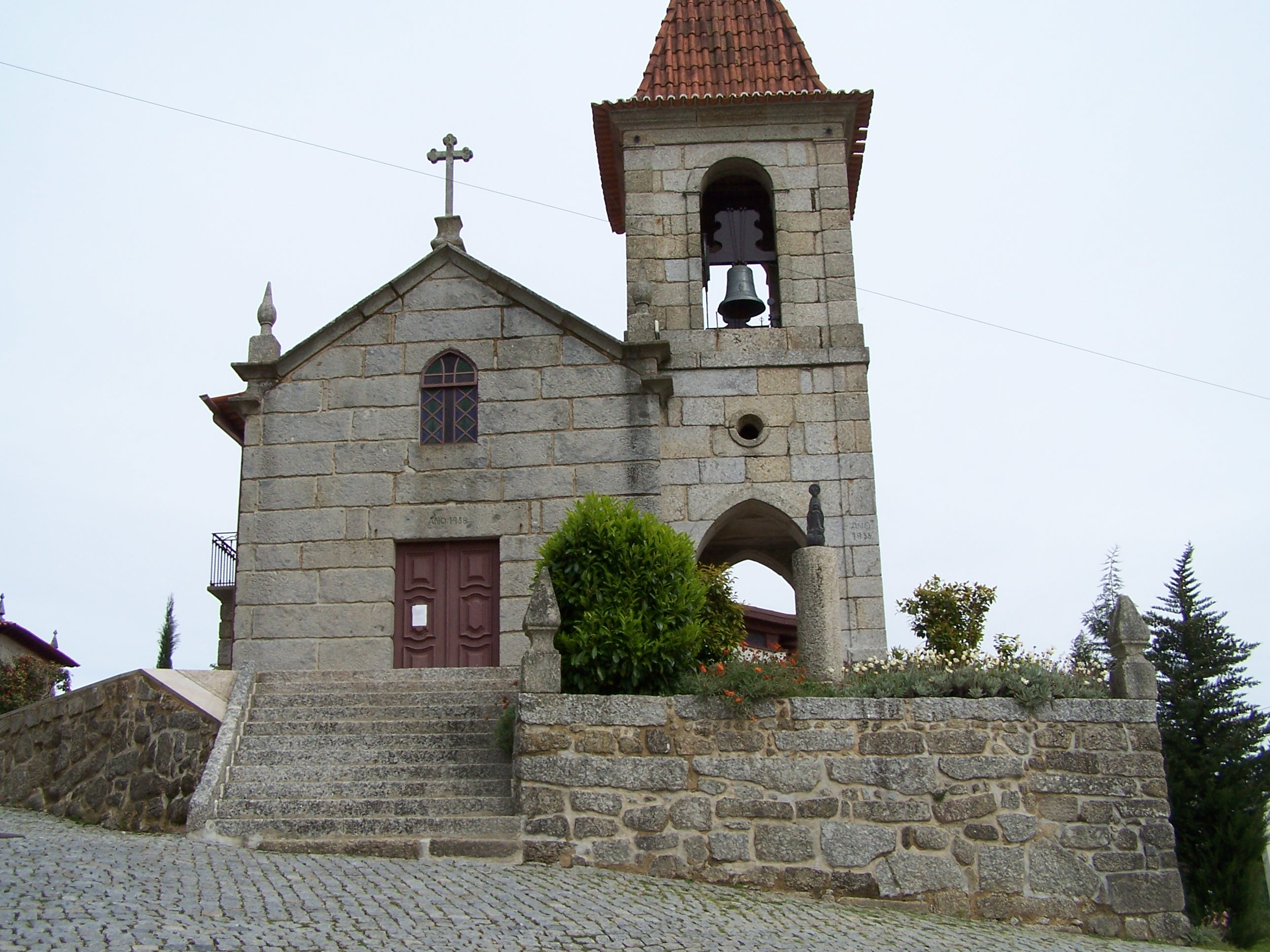
Figueiredo Church
