= Tabuadelo e São Faustino =

Former parish in Guimarães, Portugal

- Civil parish
- Location of Tabuadelo e São Faustino inside the municipality of Guimarães

- Location in Portugal
- Coordinates: 41.39523°N 8.28202°W
- Country: Portugal
- Region: Norte
- Intermunic. comm.: Ave
- District: Braga
- Municipality: Guimarães
- Established: 2013
- Disbanded: 13 March 2025

Area
  - Total: 5.05 km^{2} (1.95 sq mi)

Population (2021)
  - Total: 2,415
  - Density: 478/km^{2} (1,240/sq mi)
- Time zone: UTC+00:00 (WET)
  - Summer (DST): UTC+01:00 (WEST)
- Website: https://www.jf-tabuadeloesaofaustino.pt/

Tabuadelo e São Faustino (officially: União das Freguesias de Tabuadelo e São Faustino) was a parish in the municipality of Guimarães, in Portugal. It had an area of 505 km^{2} (195 sq mi) and 2 415 inhabitants (2021 census), leading to a population density of 478 people per km².

It was established in 2013 by the merger of the parishes of Tabuadelo and São Faustino, with Tabuadelo being the administrative centre.

It was dissolved on 13 March 2025, restoring the original parishes.

Coat of Arms of Tabuadelo

Coat of Arms of São Faustino

== Demography ==
The population registered in the census was:

Population of the parish of Tabuadelo
Year	Pop.	±%
2001	1,723	—
2011	1,555	−9.8%

Population of the parish of São Faustino
Year	Pop.	±%
2001	1,050	—
2011	998	−5.0%

Population of the parish union of Tabuadelo and São Faustino
Year	Pop.	±%
2021	2,415	—

Distribution of the population by age groups
Before the merger
Year	0-14	15-24	25-64	>64	Total
2001	602	497	1459	215	2773
2011	452	340	1487	274	2553
After the merger
Year	0-14	15-24	25-64	>64	Total
2021	288	303	1384	440	2415
