= Oleiros (Guimarães) =

Extinct parish in Guimarães, Portugal

- Civil parish
- The church of Oleiros in 2022

- Coat of arms

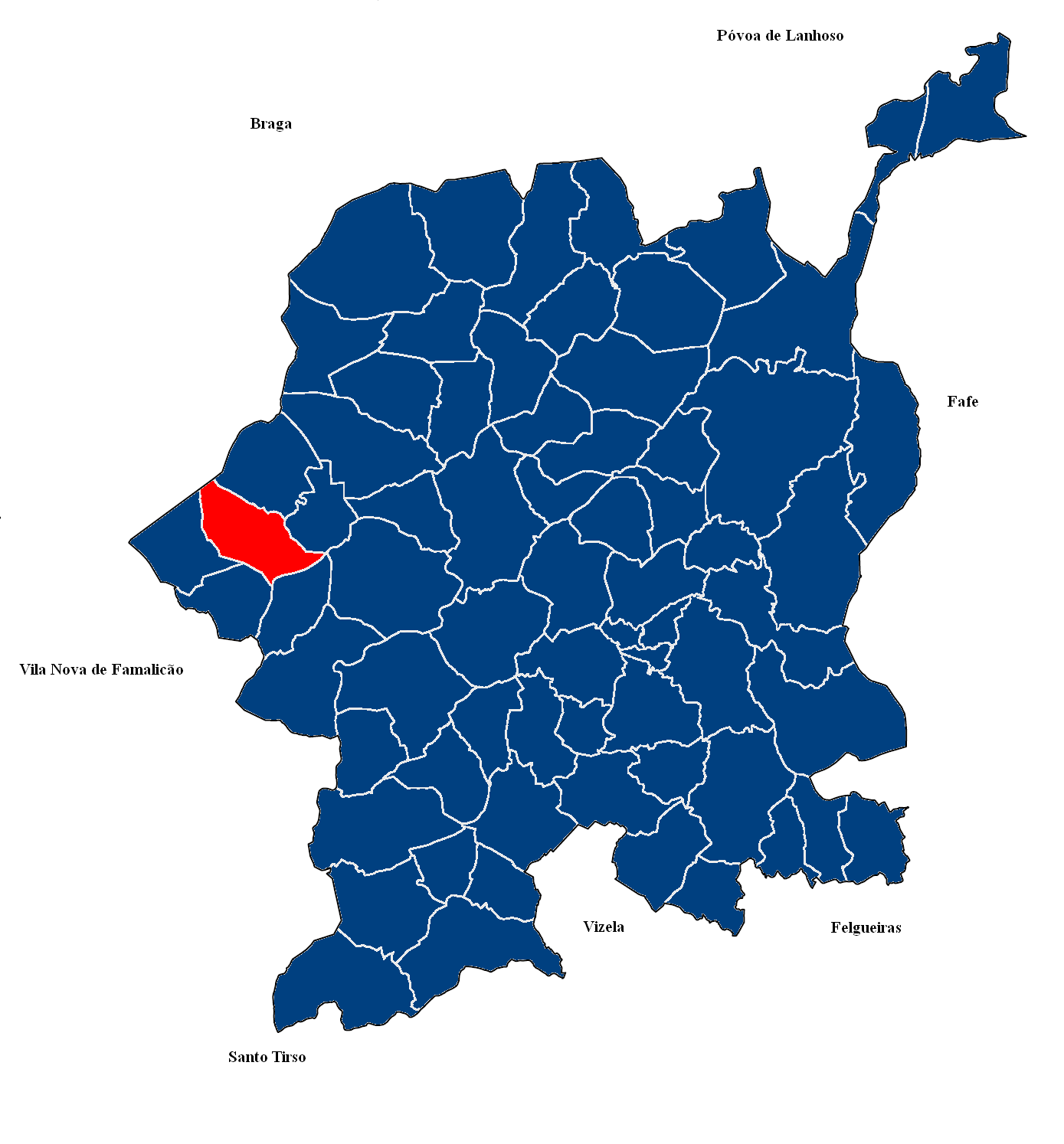
- Location within Guimarães
- Coordinates: 41°27′42″N 8°24′03″W
- Country: Portugal
- Region: Norte
- Intermunic. comm.: Ave
- District: Braga
- Municipality: Guimarães

Area
  - Total: 3.31 km^{2} (1.28 sq mi)

Population (2011)
  - Total: 462
  - Density: 140/km^{2} (362/sq mi)
- Time zone: UTC+00:00 (WET)
  - Summer (DST): UTC+01:00 (WEST)
- Patron: Saint Vincent

Oleiros is a Portuguese village in the municipality of Guimarães which was the administrative centre of the former parish of Oleiros, covering an area of 3.31 km^{2} (1.28 sq mi) with a population of 462 (2011), giving it a population density of 139.6 inhabitants per km².

It was abolished in 2013 as part of a national administrative reform, so that, together with the parishes of Leitões and Figueiredo, it could form a new parish called Leitões, Oleiros e Figueiredo, with its administrative centre of it being in Leitões.

Its entire territory dates back to pre-Roman times, and the São Miguel hillfort, situated on mount São Miguel, which Oleiros shares with neighbouring parishes, sits there since the Castro period. Furthermore, this parish also contains archaeological remains of ancient settlements, which bear witness to its long history. An archaeological inventory of the parish records the existence of the remains of a thermal bath complex on mount Susana, which operated using a hypocaust, a surface heating system in which heat was generated by a furnace. The earliest known document relating to Oleiros dates from 924 and concerns a donation by a priest, Belisário, to another priest, Gosendo.

== Population ==
Population of the parish of Oleiros (1864 – 2011)
1864	1878	1890	1900	1911	1920	1930	1940	1950	1960	1970	1981	1991	2001	2011
332	347	405	380	348	364	452	328	458	481	531	527	449	510	462
