= Urgezes =

Parish in Guimarães, Portugal

- Civil parish
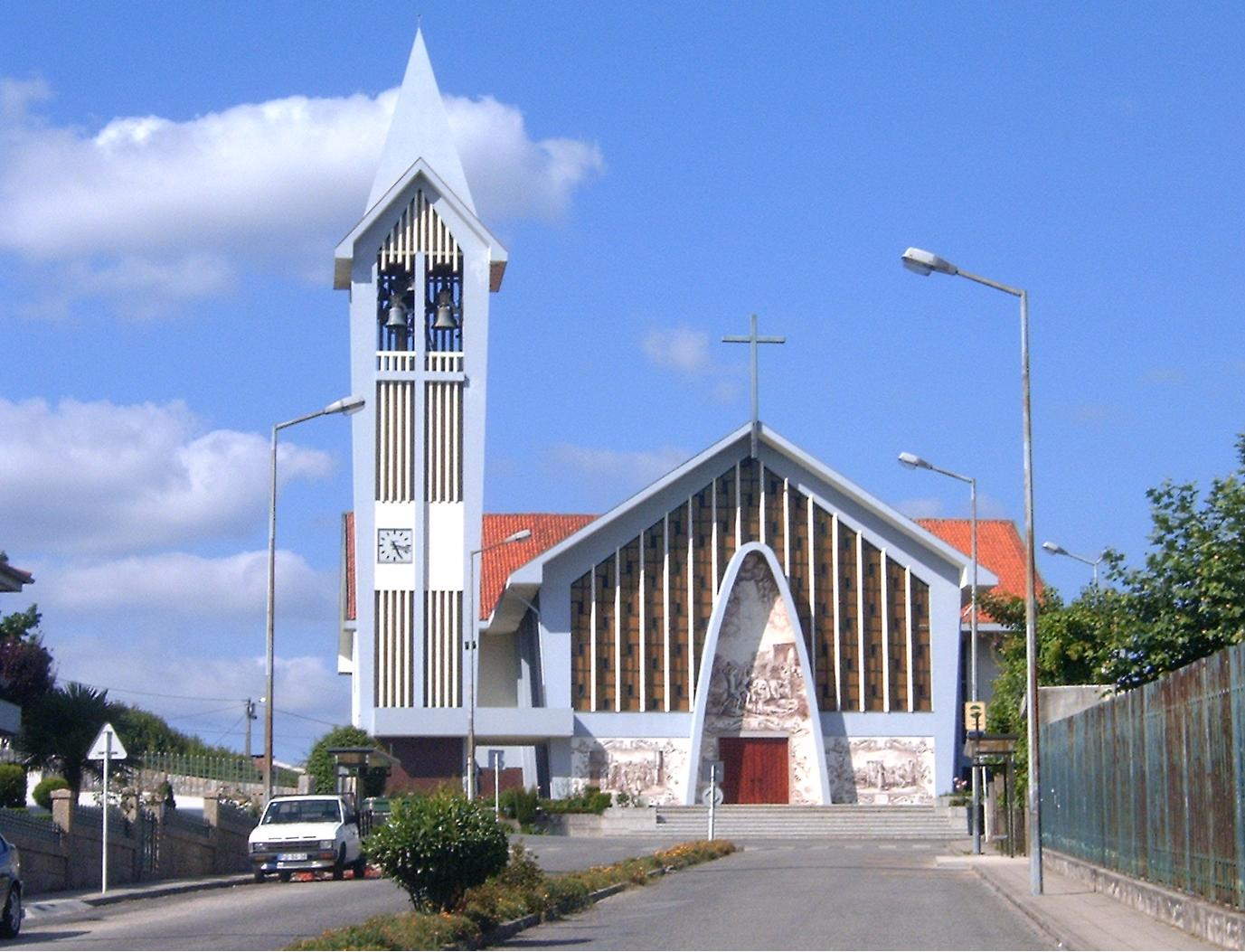
- The church of Urgezes, 2005

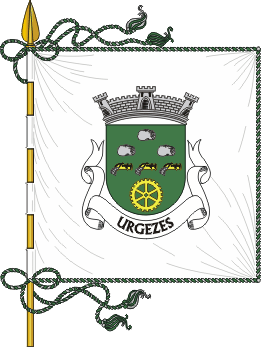
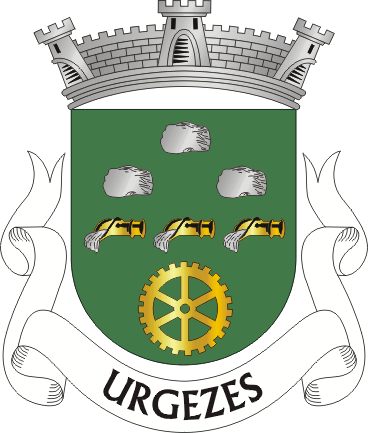
- Flag Coat of arms

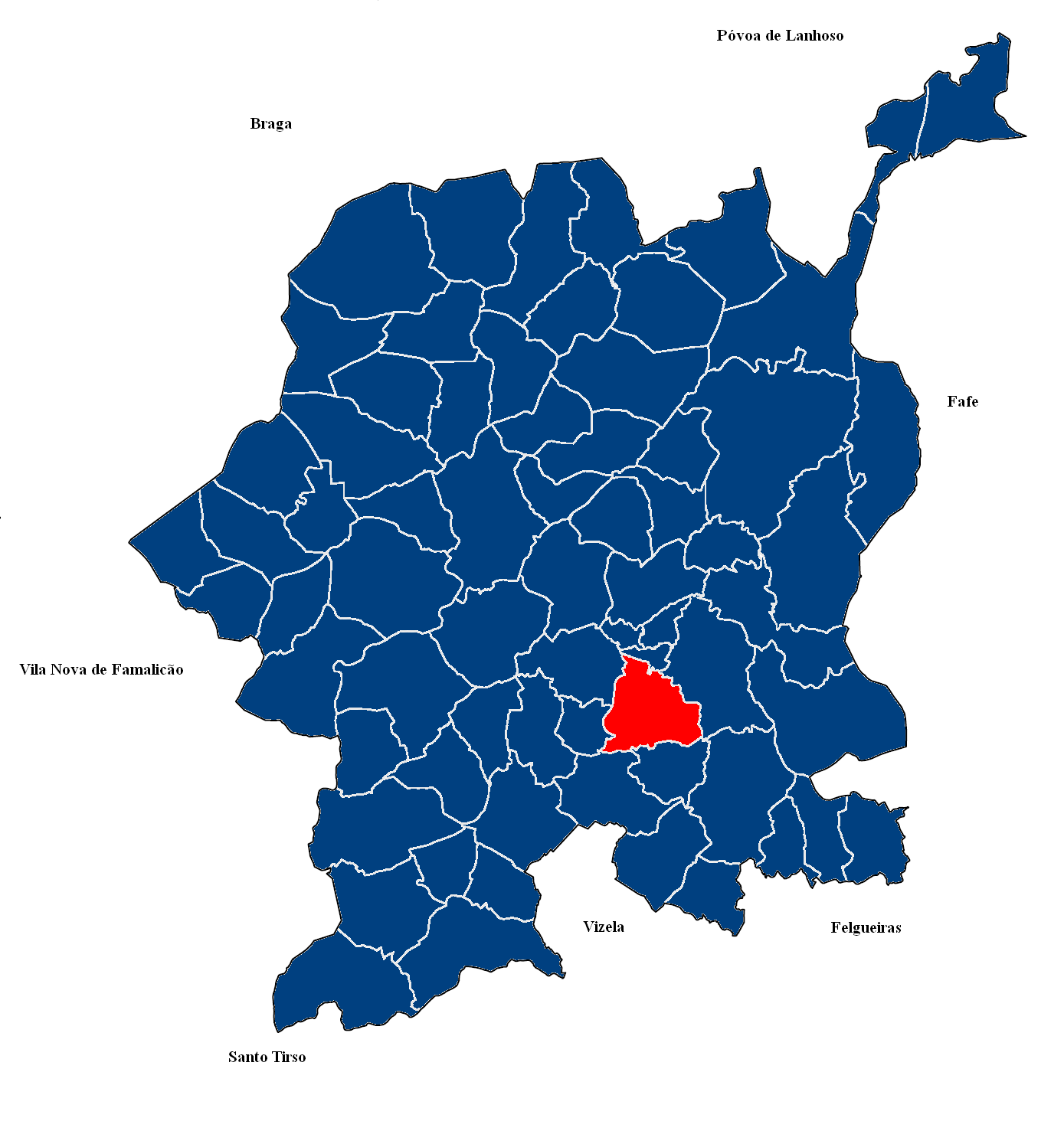
- Coordinates: 41°25′33″N 8°17′49″W
- Country: Portugal
- Region: Norte
- Intermunic. comm.: Ave
- District: Braga
- Municipality: Guimarães

Area
  - Total: 3.31 km^{2} (1.28 sq mi)

Population (2021)
  - Total: 5,517
  - Density: 1,670/km^{2} (4,320/sq mi)
- Time zone: UTC+00:00 (WET)
  - Summer (DST): UTC+01:00 (WEST)
- Patron: Saint Stephen
- Website: www.freg-urgezes.pt

Urgezes, previously known as Santo Estêvão de Urgezes, is a civil parish in the municipality of Guimarães, Portugal. The population in 2021 was 5,259 on an area of 3.31 km^{2} (1.28 sq mi). The civil parish makes up part of the surroundings of the city center of Guimarães. The parish has a football team named Amigos de Urgezes.

The Dízimo de Urgezes, one of the smaller festivities of the Nicolinas, that traces its origins to 1717, takes place here.

== Landmarks ==
- Arquinho Factory
- Garage Avenida
- Castanheiro Factory
- Cavalinho Factory
- Gardens of the Vila Flor Palace
- Guimarães Railway Station (new)
- Guimarães Railway Station (old)
- Holy fountain of St. Gualter
- Hotel Fundador
- Hotel Guimarães
- Jordão Theatre
- Minhoto Factory
- Parish Church of Urgezes
- Vila Flor Cultural Centre
- Vila Flor Palace
- Villa commercial centre

== Demography ==
2021 census:

The population of Urgezes since 1864 was of:

Population of Urgezes

Year	Pop.	±%
1864	648	—
1878	752	+16.0%
1890	811	+7.8%
1900	940	+15.9%
1911	1,129	+20.1%
1920	895	−20.7%
1930	1,512	+68.9%
1940	1,953	+29.2%

Year	Pop.	±%
1950	2,651	+35.7%
1960	3,413	+28.7%
1970	3,899	+14.2%
1981	4,335	+11.2%
1991	4,718	+8.8%
2001	5,124	+8.6%
2011	5,259	+2.6%
2021	5,518	+4.9%

Population Distribution by Age Group
Age group	0–14	15–24	25–64	> 65
2001	871	768	2838	647
2011	721	637	3035	866
2021	727	549	3063	1178
