= Guimarães =

Municipality and city in Norte, Portugal

- Municipality
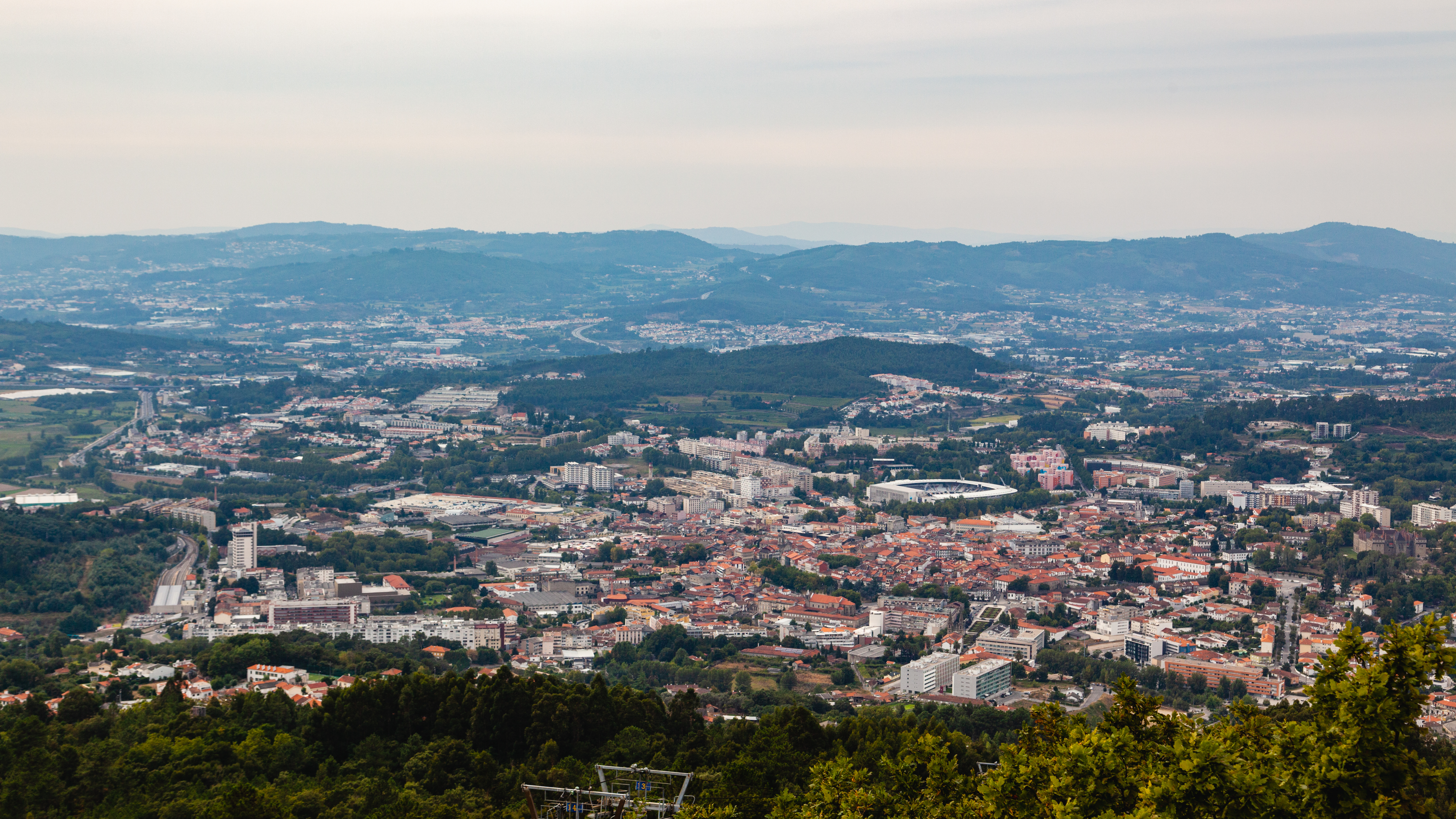
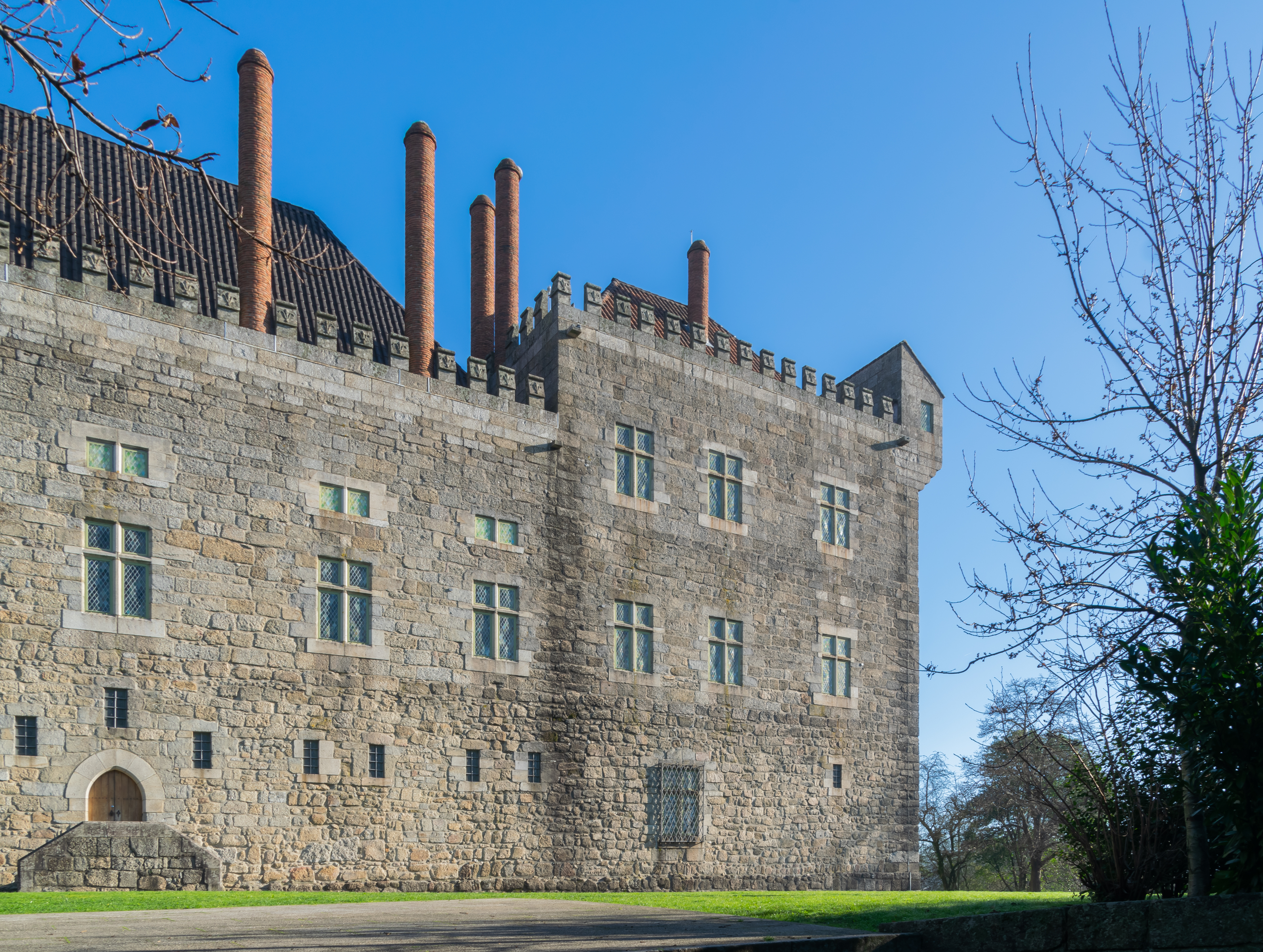
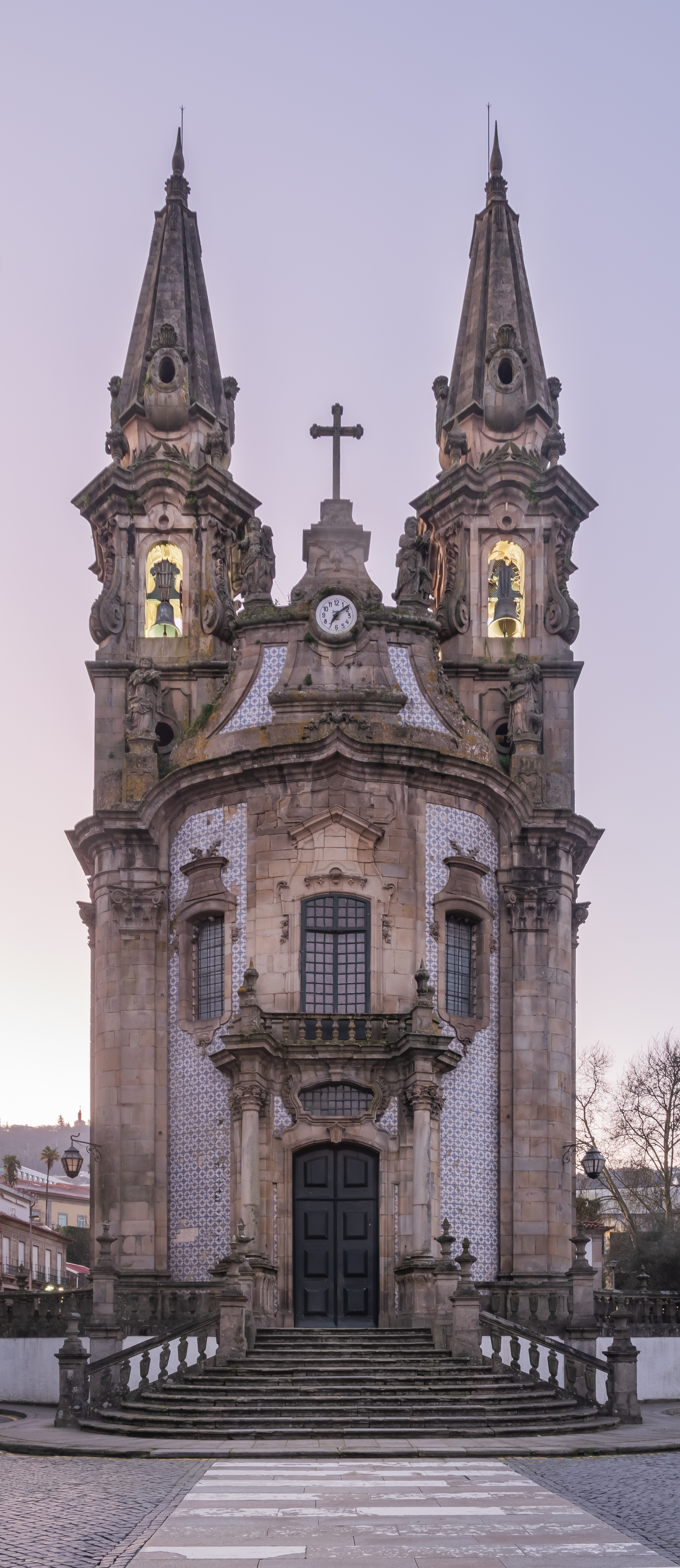
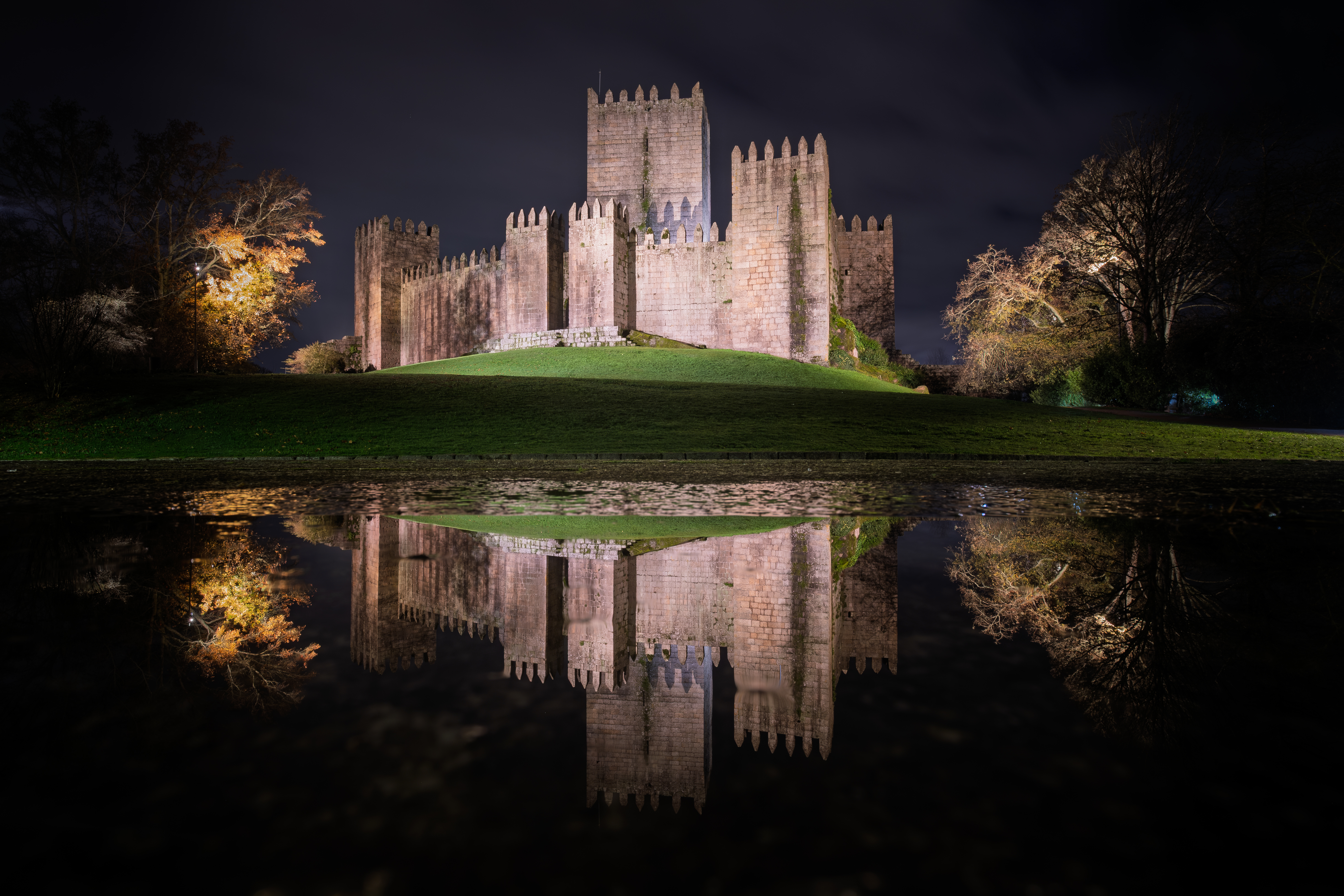
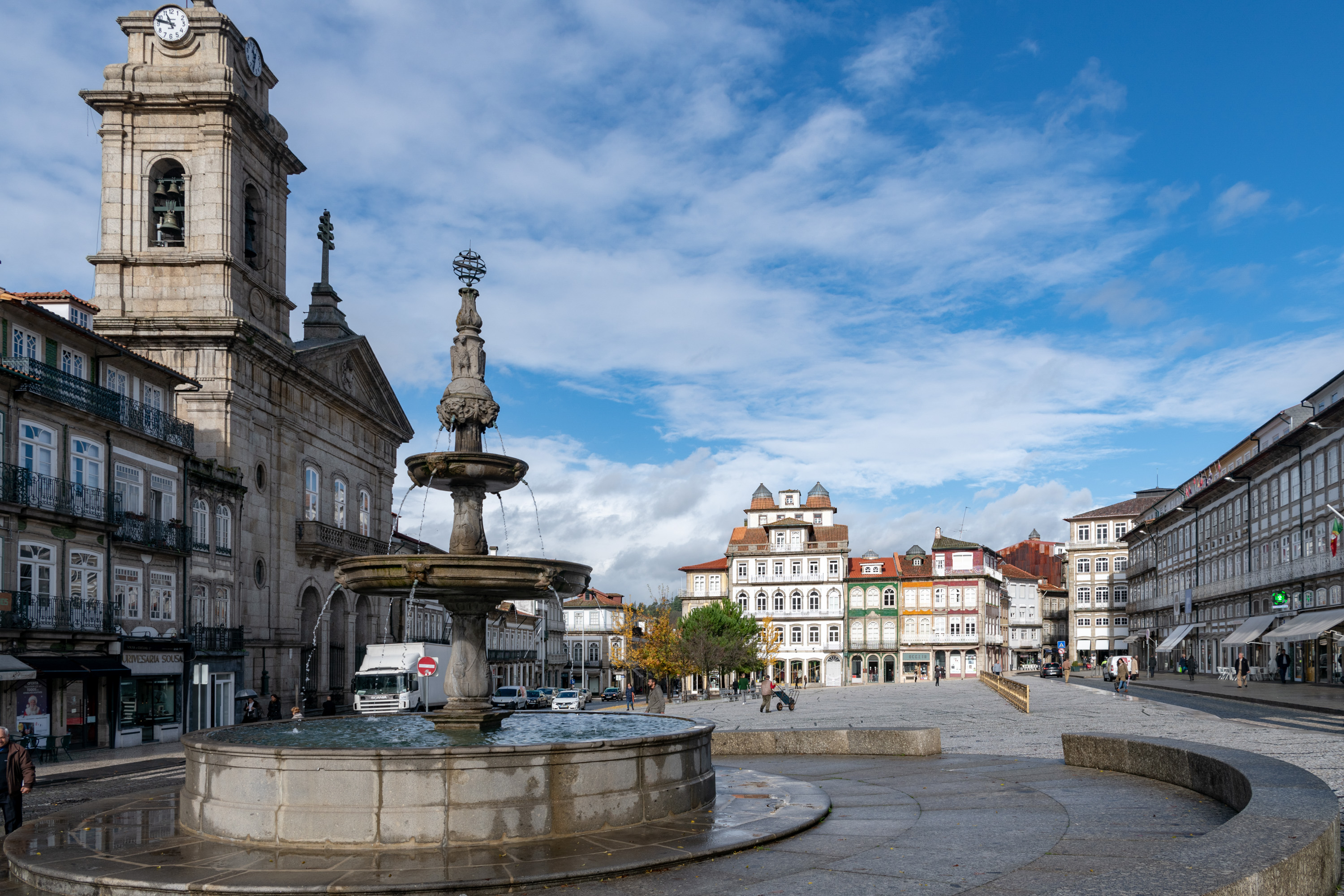
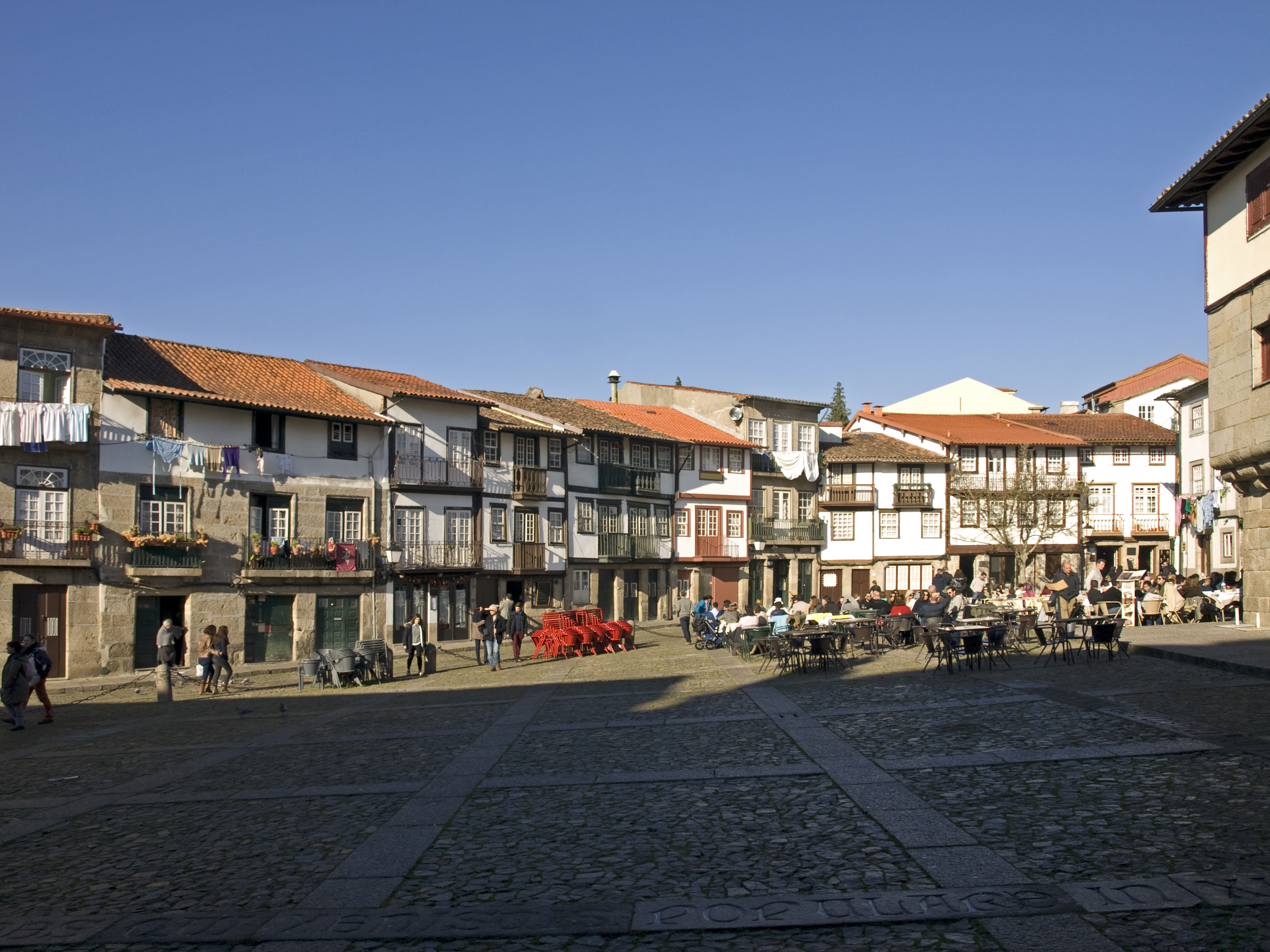
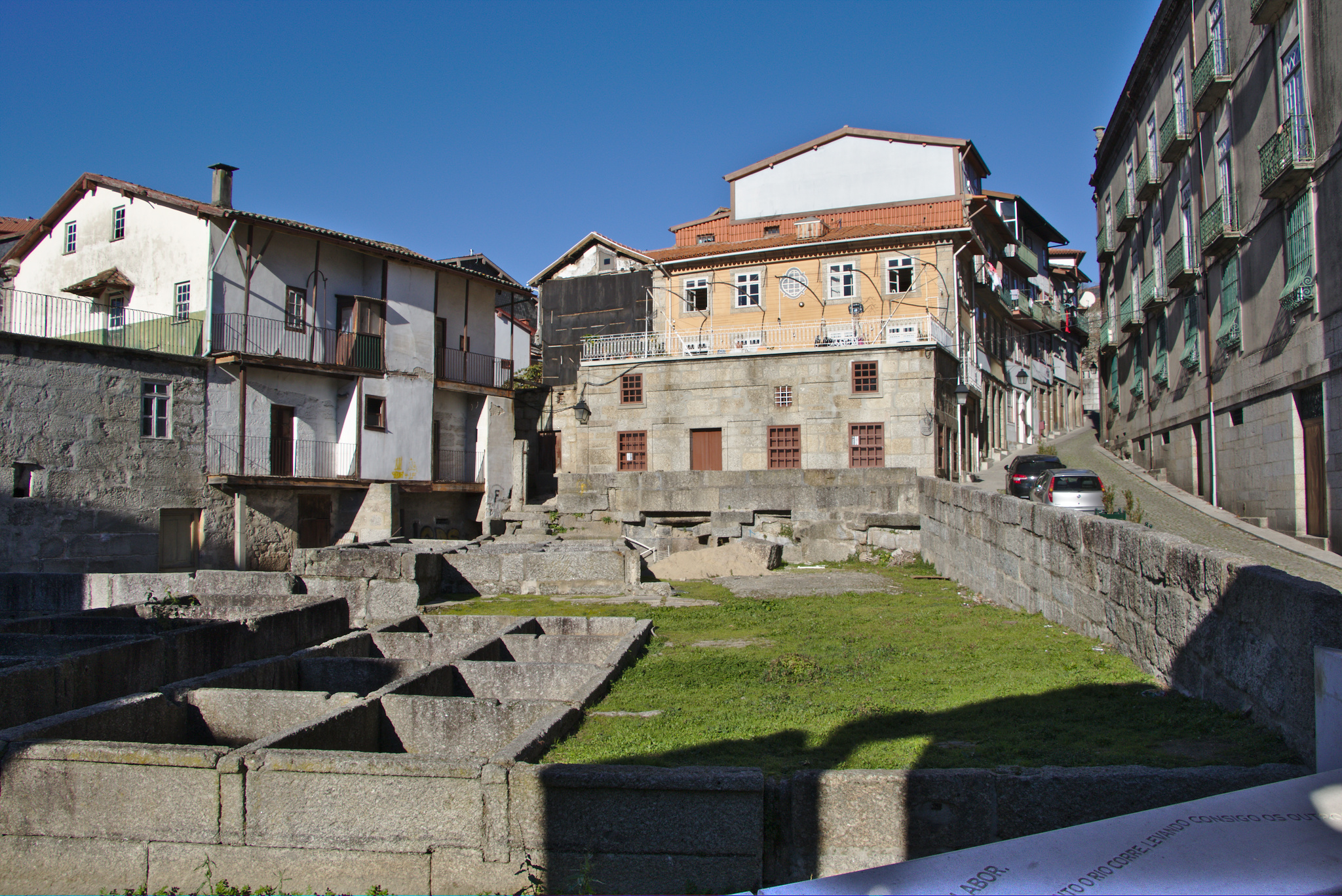
- Panorama of Guimarães Palace of the Dukes of Braganza Santos Passos Church Castle of Guimarães Toural Square Oliveira Square Santiago Square Couros Zone

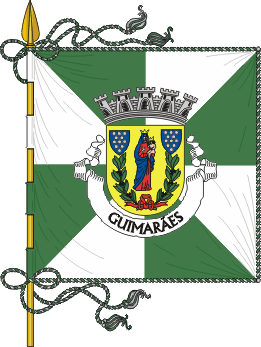
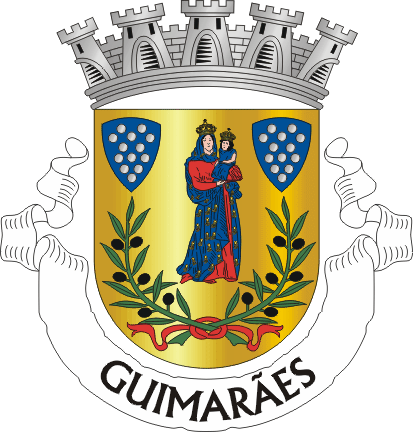
- Flag Coat of arms
- Interactive map of Guimarães
- Location within Portugal Location within Europe
- Coordinates: 41°26′42″N 8°17′26.88″W
- Country: Portugal
- Region: Northern Region
- Subregion: Ave
- District: Braga
- Historical province: Entre Douro e Minho
- Foral: 1096; 930 years ago
- Seat: Guimarães Municipal Chamber
- Civil parishes: 48

Government
  - Type: Local administrative unit
  - Body: Câmara municipal
  - Mayor: Ricardo Araújo (PSD-CDS–PP)
  - Assembly chair: Rui Armindo da Costa Freitas

Area
  - Total: 241.3 km^{2} (93.2 sq mi)
- Highest elevation: 613 m (2,011 ft)
- Lowest elevation: 77 m (253 ft)

Population (2025)
  - Total: 165,554
  - Rank: 17th
  - Density: 686.1/km^{2} (1,777/sq mi)
- Demonym: Vimaranense
- Time zone: UTC (WET)
  - Summer (DST): UTC+1 (WEST)
- Postal code: 48XX-XXX Guimarães
- Area code: (+351) 253
- Patron Saint: Gualter
- Municipal Holiday: 24 June (Battle of São Mamede)
- Website: CM Guimarães

UNESCO World Heritage Site
- Official name: Historic Centre of Guimarães and Couros Zone
- Criteria: Cultural: (ii), (iii), (iv)
- Reference: 1031
- Inscription: 2001 (25th Session)
- Area: 38.2 ha (94 acres)
- Buffer zone: 109.4 ha (270 acres)

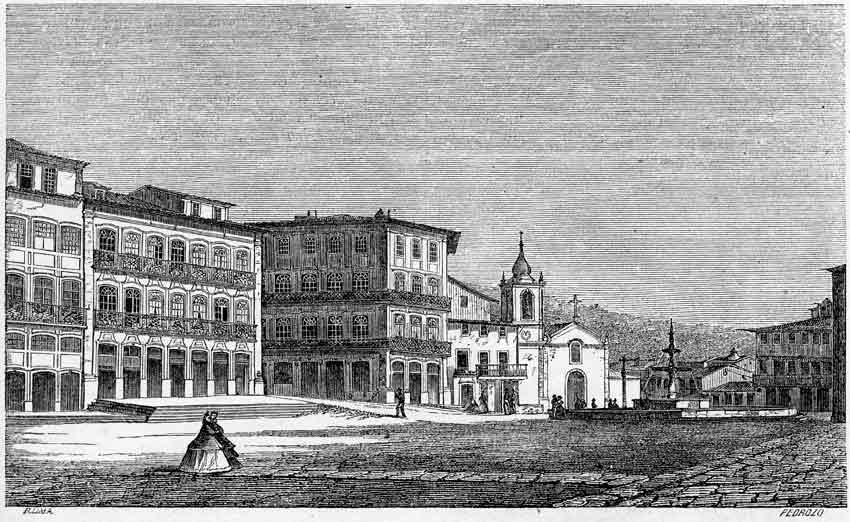
The Toural Square in 1864

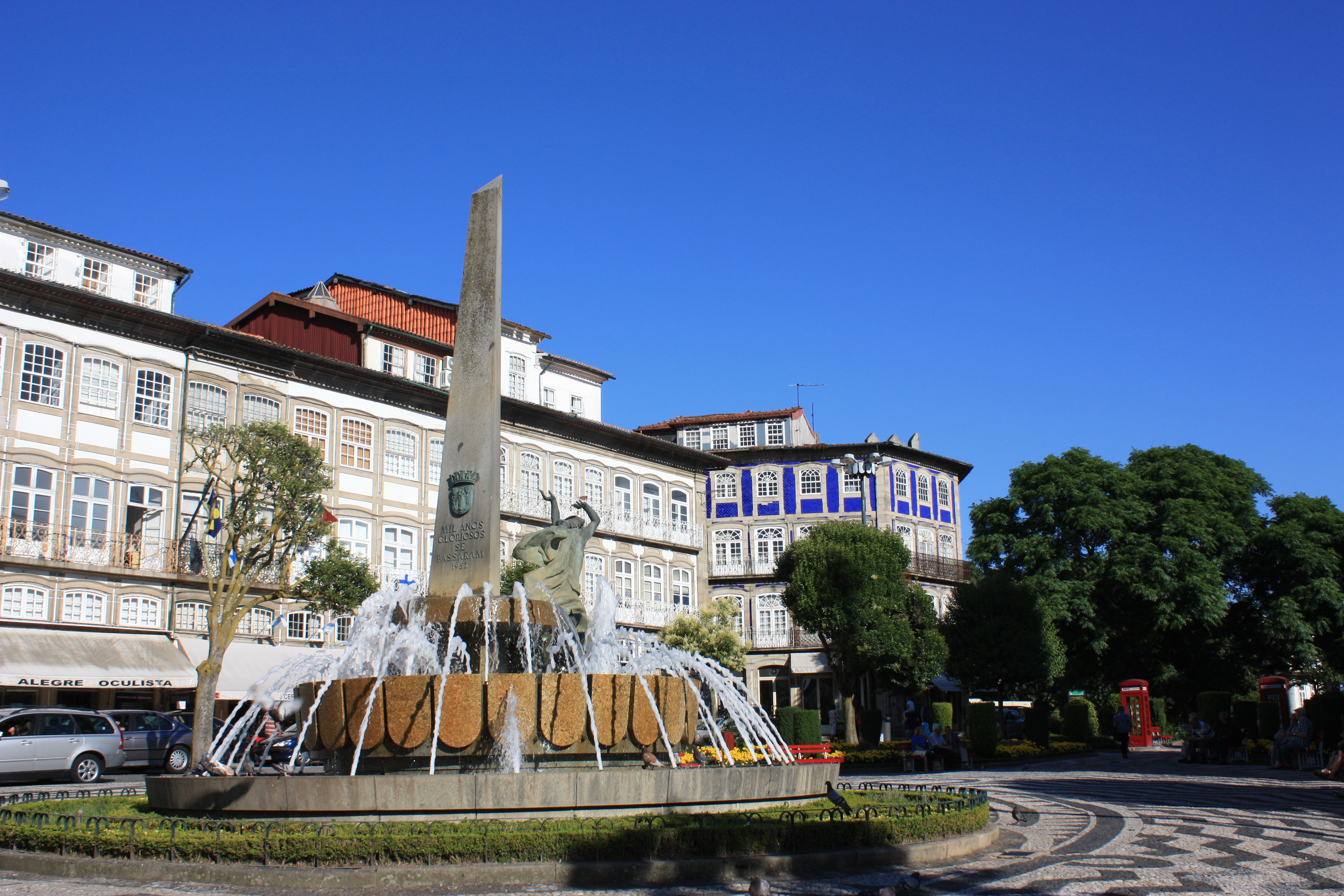
The Toural Square in 2009

Guimarães (Note: European Portuguese pronunciation: [ɡimɐˈɾɐ̃jʃ]) is a city and municipality located in northern Portugal. Its historic town centre has been listed as a UNESCO World Heritage Site since 2001, in recognition for being an "exceptionally well-preserved and authentic example of the evolution of a medieval settlement into a modern town" in Europe. The Nicolinas are the city's main festivities.

Guimarães is referred to as the capital of the Ave Subregion (one of the most industrialised subregions in the country), and located in the historical Minho Province. The municipality has a population of 156,789 inhabitants according to the most recent data of 2023 in an area of 240.95 square kilometres (93.03 sq mi). The current mayor is Ricardo Araújo. Guimarães, along with Maribor, Slovenia, was the European Capital of Culture in 2012. Guimarães also received the 2026 European Green Capital Award.

The city was settled in the 9th century, at which time it was called Vimaranes. This name might have had its origin in the warrior Vímara Peres, who chose this area as the main government seat for the County of Portugal which he conquered for the Kingdom of Galicia. Guimarães has a significant historical importance due to the role it played in the foundation of Portugal. The city is commonly referred to as the "birthplace of Portugal" or "the cradle city" (Cidade Berço in Portuguese) because it was in Guimarães that Portugal's first King, Afonso Henriques was born, and also because the Battle of São Mamede – which is considered the seminal event for the foundation of the Kingdom of Portugal – was fought in the vicinity of the city. It was declared the most beautiful small city in Europe by the Condé Nast Traveler magazine in 2022.

== History ==
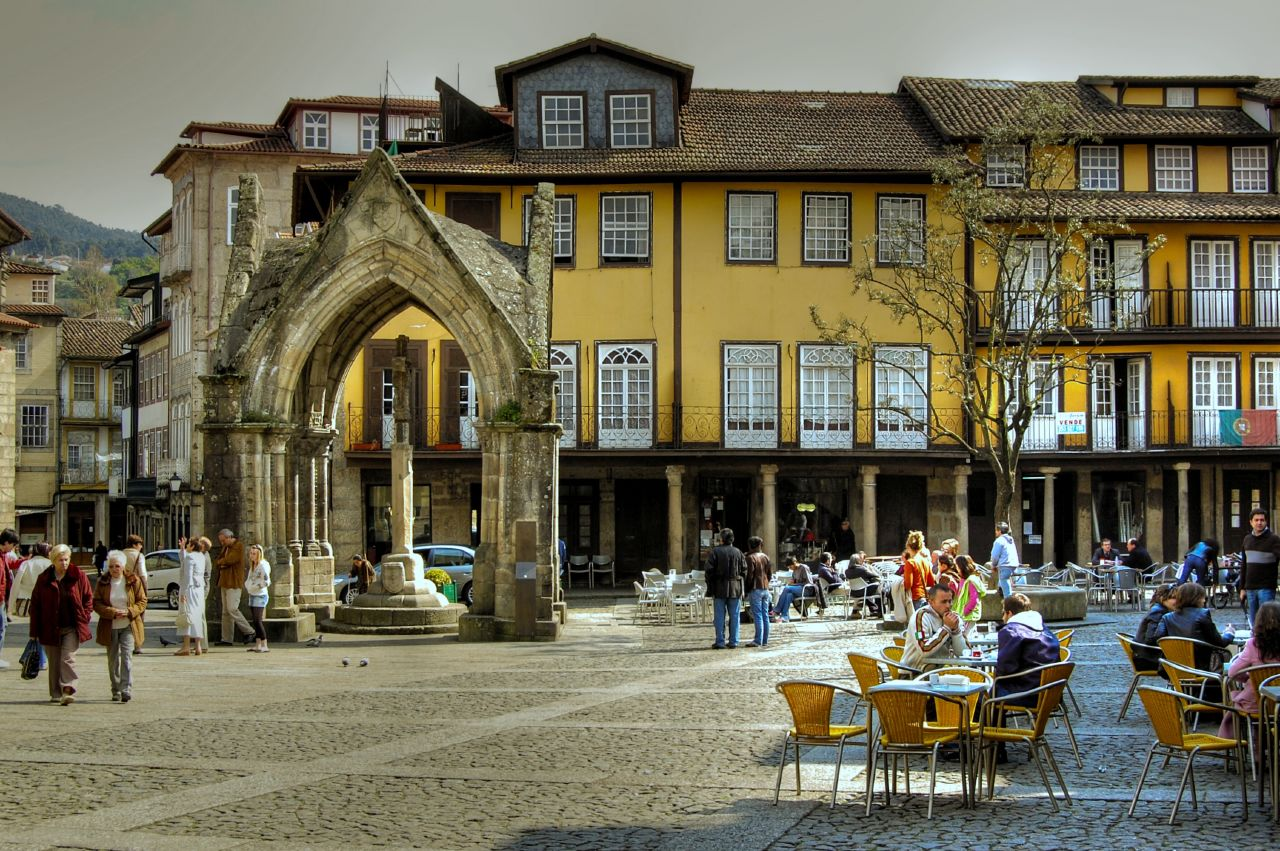
The Oliveira square, in the historical center of Guimarães, with the Padrão do Salado on the left

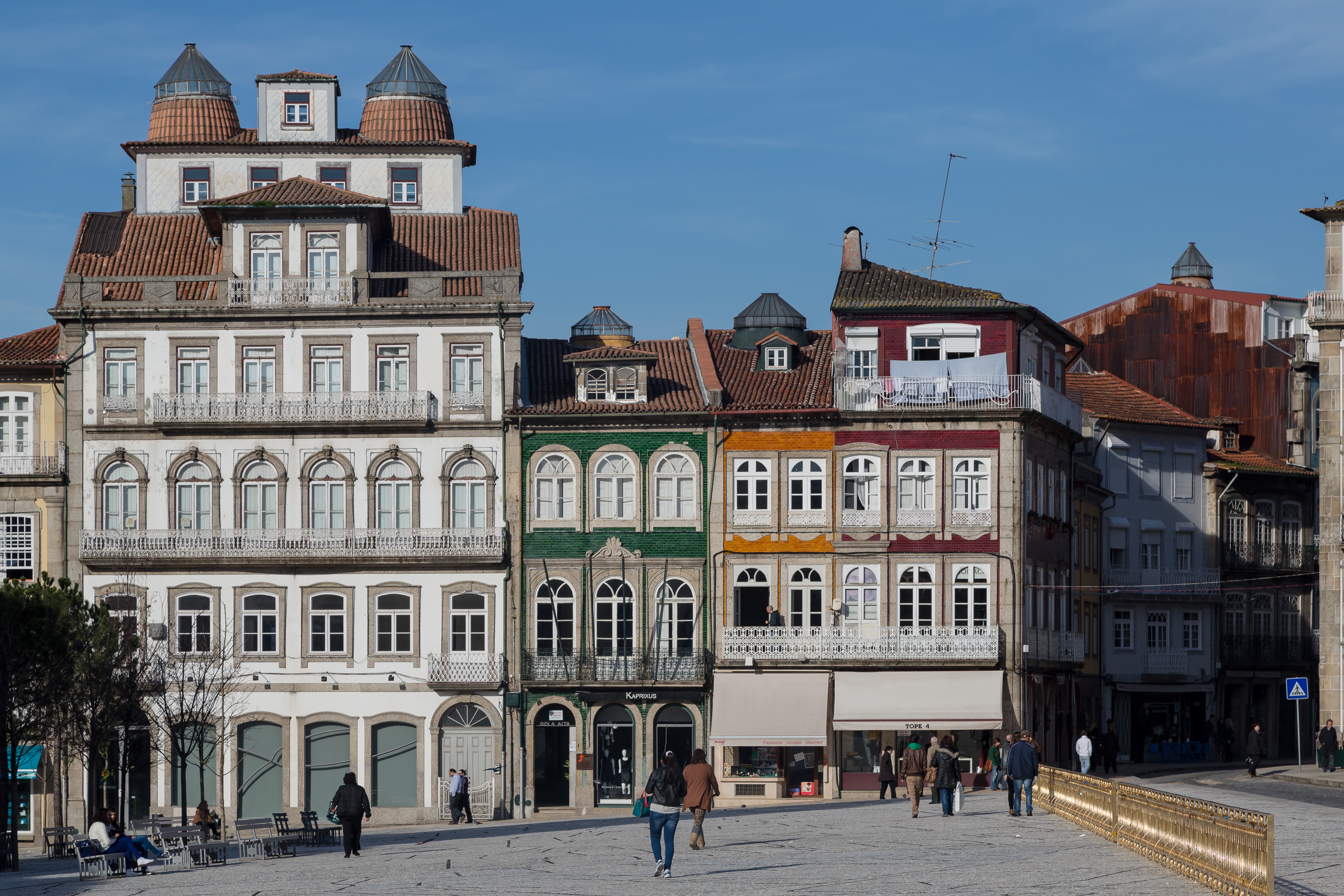
Pombaline buildings in the Toural, Guimarães, Portugal

The History of Guimarães is associated with the foundation and identity of the Portuguese nationality. Guimarães, as well as other settlements, precedes the foundation of Portugal and because of its role in the foundation of the country it is known as the "cradle of the Portuguese nationality". In 1128, major political and military events that would lead to the independence and the birth of a new nation took place in Guimarães. For this reason, in one of the old towers of the city's old wall is written "Aqui nasceu Portugal" (Portugal was born here).

=== Ancient history ===
According to archeological findings in Citânia (Castro) of Briteiros and Sabroso and Penha's archeologic site, the area in which Guimarães is located has had permanent settlements since the late Chalcolithic period.

There is also evidence of Roman occupation, and a stone dedicated to the Roman emperor Trajan found in Caldas das Taipas suggests that this was already a spa town in Roman times.

=== Foundation ===
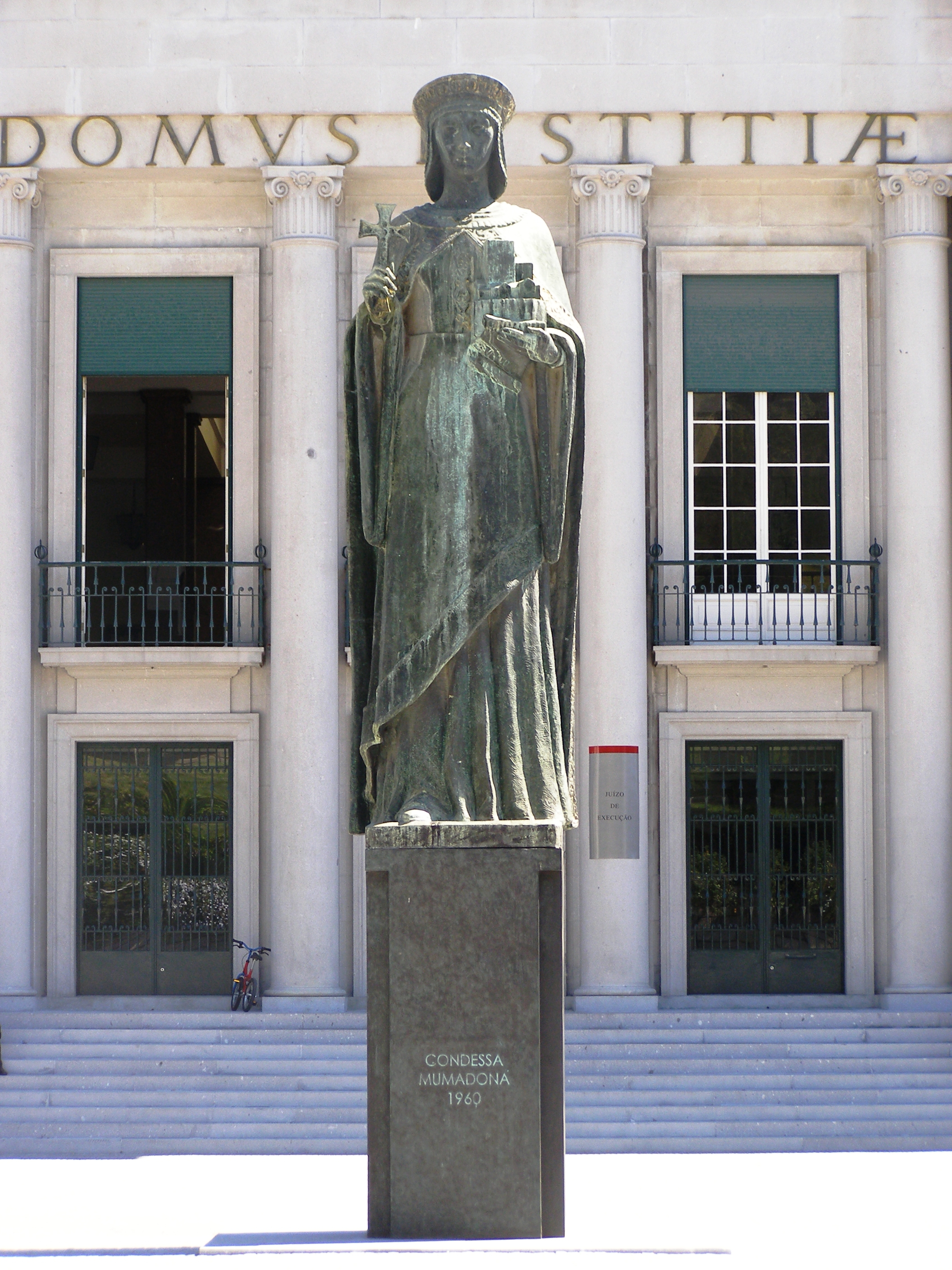
Statue of Mumadona Dias, in front of the city court

Following the Reconquista policy promoted by the Kingdom of Galicia in the 9th century, the medieval foundations of the actual city have roots in the 10th century. At this point, the Countess Mumadona Dias, erected a monastery in her property of Vimaranes, which led to the settlement of people in the area known as "vila baixa" (downtown). At the same time, she ordered the construction of a castle on the hill area which became known as "vila alta" (uptown), to defend the settlement. To connect these to other areas, the Rua de Santa Maria was built.

The monastery became the "Real Colegiada" (Royal Collegiate church) and throughout time acquired importance due to the privileges and donations given to it by nobles and kings and it became a famous pilgrimage site.

Henry, Count of Portugal approved the first national foral possibly in 1096 (but not confirmed). The foral proves the growing importance of the village of Guimarães at that time, which was chosen as the capital of the County of Portugal.

On 24 June 1128, the "Batalha de São Mamede" (Battle of São Mamede) took place in Guimarães.

=== Middle Ages ===
During the reign of king Denis, as the town was expanding, it was partially surrounded by a defensive wall. Meanwhile, mendicant orders settled in Guimarães and helped to mold the shape of the emerging city. Later, during the reign of John I, the wall was torn down and the two parts of the city (uptown and downtown) were finally united and the city began to expand outside its old walls.

Guimarães was home to a notable Jewish community, concentrated around present-day Praça do Peixe and Rua do Espírito Santo. By the late 14th century, the community had contributed an annual tax of 25,000 réis. The area included communal institutions such as synagogues, schools, and a market. Following the 1496 decree by King Manuel I, requiring all Jews to convert or leave Portugal, some members of the community became Marranos. Notable individuals include Manuel Thomàs and the wife of rabbi Menasseh ben Israel. Public Jewish life in Guimarães ceased after the Inquisition. However, traces of its Jewish history remain in the urban layout of the city and through descendants (including the family Guimarães).

The construction of St. Peter's Basilica began in 1737, and became a minor basilica in 1751, with formal completion of the work between 1883 and 1884.

=== Modern history ===
Until the 19th century the structure of the city did not suffer many transformations besides the construction of a few more churches, convents and palaces. It was by the ending of the 19th century that new urbanistic ideas of hygiene and symmetry that the village, that was promoted to city by the Queen Maria II on 23 June 1853 had its greatest changes.

The complete demolition of the city walls was authorized and the creation of many streets and avenues could start at that point. The controlled process of urbanization permitted the conservation of the city's magnificent historical centre.

Guimarães hosted the 2024 European Trampoline Championships.

== Geography ==
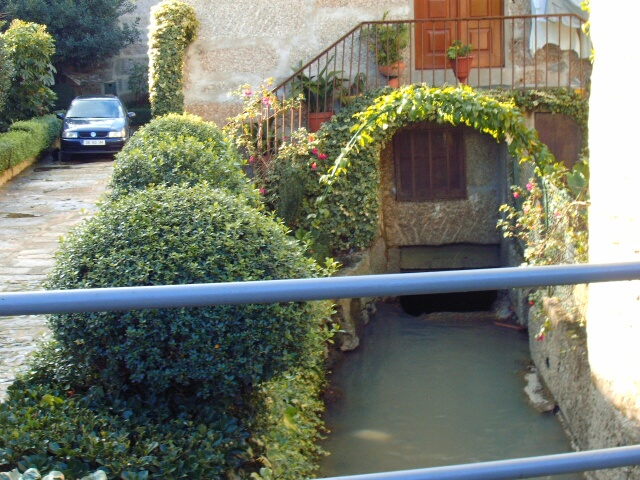
Couros River, near Guimarães Youth Hostel, 2003

=== Geology ===
Granite rock formations occupy the majority of the municipality but schist rocks can also be found in certain zones in the northwest of the municipality. On the southeast, clay can be found in stream bed of the Ave, Vizela and Selho rivers.

=== Orography and hydrography ===
The municipality is delimited at north by the "Senhora do Monte" (Senhora hill), at northwest by the hills of Falperra, Sameiro, Outeiro and Penedice. To the south is the Monte da Penha, which is the highest point of the municipality, with a height of 613 metres (2,011 ft) above mean sea level.

Guimarães is part of the drainage basin of Ave river which divides the municipality in half. The Ave river has as tributaries the Vizela, Torto, Febras and inside the city, the Selho, the Couros and the Santa Lúzia stream.

=== Climate ===
Guimarães is located in a valley surrounded by hills, at some distance from the sea. Summers tend to be lightly humid and hot, though still with some oceanic moderation compared to other locations further inland. Winters are generally cool and rainy, with about 29 days with frost per year on average. The last time it snowed with accumulation in the city was in January 2009, though nearby hills such as Penha may experience it more often. The average annual temperature is 14 °C.

=== Fauna ===
There is not much diversity, especially in the urban areas, but the municipality has some species of cynegetic interest such as: the red fox, the wild boar, the turtle dove, the thrush, the pigeon and the red-legged partridge. In the green areas of the city, the most common species are rodents, especially squirrels.

=== Parishes ===
Administratively, the municipality of Guimarães is divided into 48 civil parishes (freguesias), previously having 69, but some of these were extinct and merged in 2013, after a nationwide territorial reorganization.

=== Demographics ===
Evolution of the population of the municipality of Guimarães (1801–2021)

Year	Pop.	±%
1801	47,465	—
1849	46,619	−1.8%
1864	44,188	−5.2%
1878	46,277	+4.7%
1890	49,738	+7.5%
1900	54,910	+10.4%
1911	58,997	+7.4%

Year	Pop.	±%
1920	56,359	−4.5%
1930	65,417	+16.1%
1940	82,120	+25.5%
1950	97,064	+18.2%
1960	116,272	+19.8%
1970	121,145	+4.2%
1981	146,959	+21.3%

Year	Pop.	±%
1991	157,589	+7.2%
2001	159,576	+1.3%
2008	162,636	+1.9%
2011	158,124	−2.8%
2021	156,830	−0.8%

Source: source INE

Evolution of the population in the city centre (1864–2011)

Year	Pop.	±%
1864	7,568	—
1878	7,980	+5.4%
1890	8,611	+7.9%
1900	9,104	+5.7%

Year	Pop.	±%
1911	9,550	+4.9%
1920	9,023	−5.5%
1930	9,521	+5.5%
1960	23,233	+144.0%

Year	Pop.	±%
2001	52,182	+124.6%
2012	54,094	+3.7%

Source: source INE and Direcção Geral do Ordenamento do Território e Desenvolvimento Urbano

== Culture ==
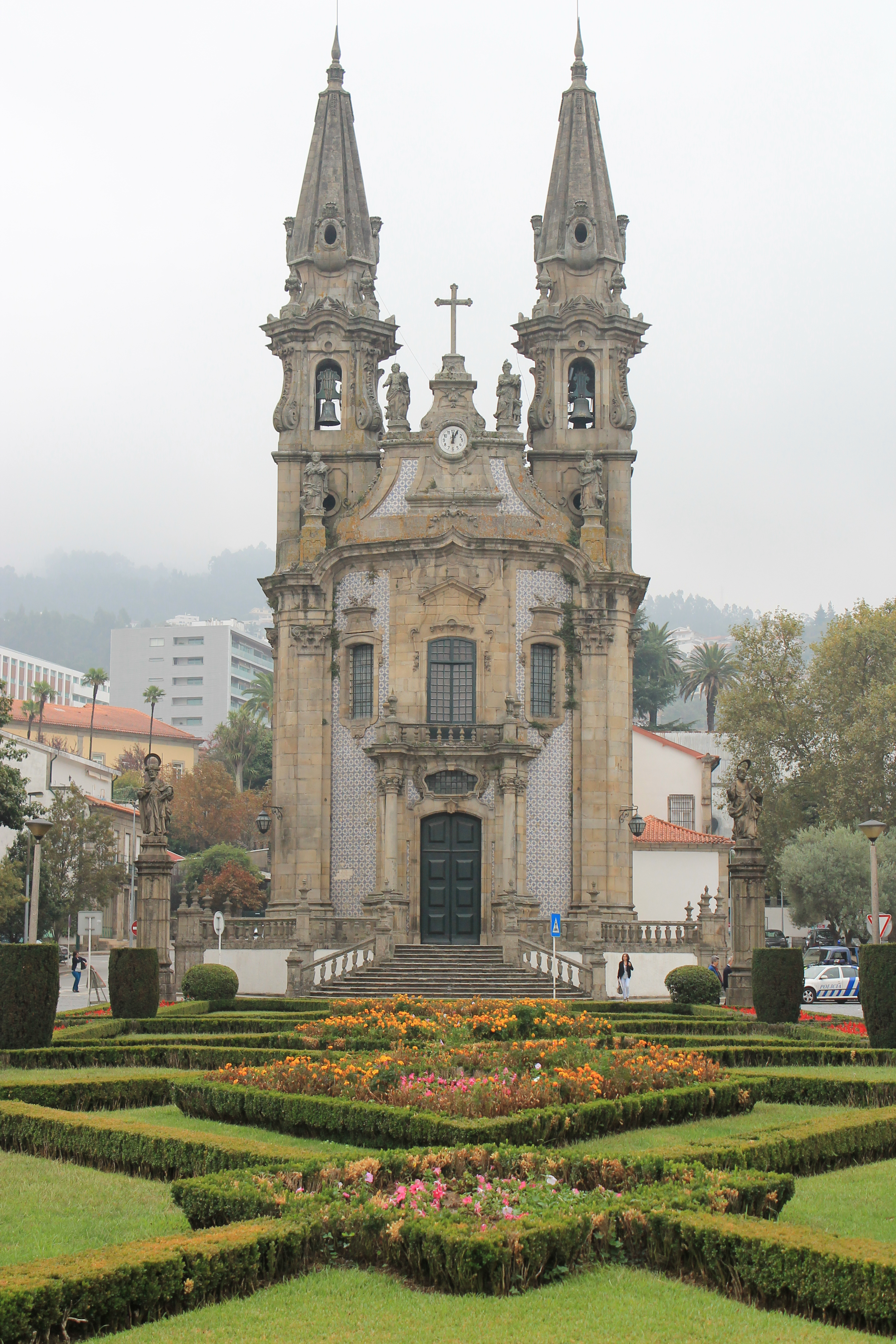
The Santos Passos Church, located at the Campo da Feira

Guimarães is an average size city but with a booming cultural life. Besides its museums, monuments, cultural associations, art galleries and popular festivities, it has since September 2005, an important cultural space, the Vila Flor Cultural Center. This cultural center has two auditoria, exhibition center and a concert-cafe. Guimarães was the European Capital of Culture in 2012, together with Maribor in Slovenia.

Guimarães is also home to association football club Vitória S.C. who compete in the Primeira Liga, the top-flight of football in Portugal.

Guimarães was elected by The New York Times one of the 41 places to go in 2011 and called it one of the Iberian Peninsula's emerging cultural spots.

=== Cuisine ===
The fact that Guimarães was founded on the lands of a female convent had a great influence on the region's cuisine, especially its confectionery, such as the "Tortas de Guimarães" (Guimarães' tarts, a half moon flakey pastry wrongfully named a tart) and, mainly, the "Toucinho do céu" (normally, but incorrectly, translated as bacon from heaven, a moist yellow-colored pudding-cake). Besides what is usual in Minho, such as "vinho verde", "Papas de sarrabulho" (a pig meat and blood porridge), "Rojões" (stewed pig meat served with potatoes and entrail sausage), etc., the so-called "Bôla de carne" (Meat cakes) is also made here, consisting of a type of bread (shaped like a pizza) served with toucinho (bacon), sardines or other toppings.

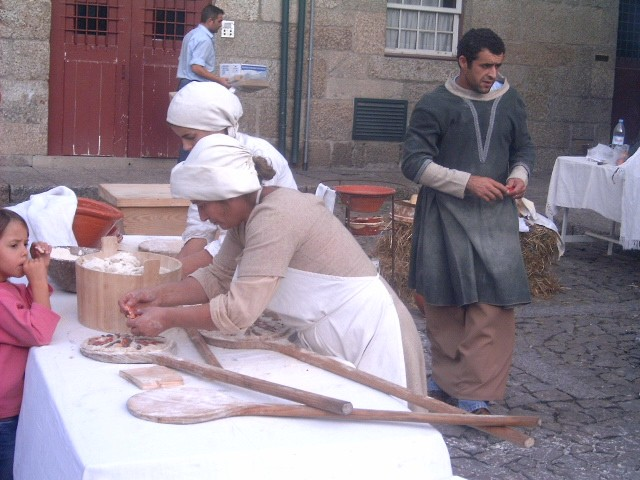
Joanina fair in Guimarães, where old activities are recreated such as the production of meat "cake"

=== Traditions and festivities ===
- Festas Gualterianas (Gualteriana festival) - in honor of São Gualter (Saint Walter, a minor franciscan friar), take place since 1906 in the first weekend of August. The "Cortejo do Linho" (Linen parade) and the "Batalha das Flores" (Battle of the Flowers) are part of the festivities which are ended by the "Marcha Gualteriana" (Gualteriana march).
- Nicolinas - are the festivities of the students of Guimarães, celebrated in honor of Saint Nicholas. The festivities start on the 29th of November and finish on the 7th of December. They are composed of different celebrations; the "Pinheiro" celebration being the most widely attended: after the "Ceia Nicolina" (Nicolinas supper), the participants parade the streets of Guimarães playing the "Toques Nicolinos" tune on drums while, traditionally, o Pinheiro (Pine/Christmas tree) is pulled in carts by bulls. Lately, it has been suggested that the "Nicolinas" should be a contender to be UNESCO intangible cultural heritage.
- Santa Luzia festivities - in honor of Saint Lucy they take place annually on 13 December, near to the chapel of Santa Luzia. One of the traditions of these festivities is the selling of traditional cakes made of rye flour and sugar, called "Sardão" and "Passarinha" (these names have sexual connotations in Portuguese, associated to male and female genitalia respectively). According to the tradition, a boy should offer a "Sardão", which has a phallic form, to the girl and if the girl was interested in dating the boy, she should reply by gifting him with a "Passarinha".
- Romaria Grande de São Torcato (São Torcato Big pilgrimage) – one of the biggest romarias in Minho, takes place annually in July in the village of São Torcato.

=== Museums, cultural spaces and art galleries ===
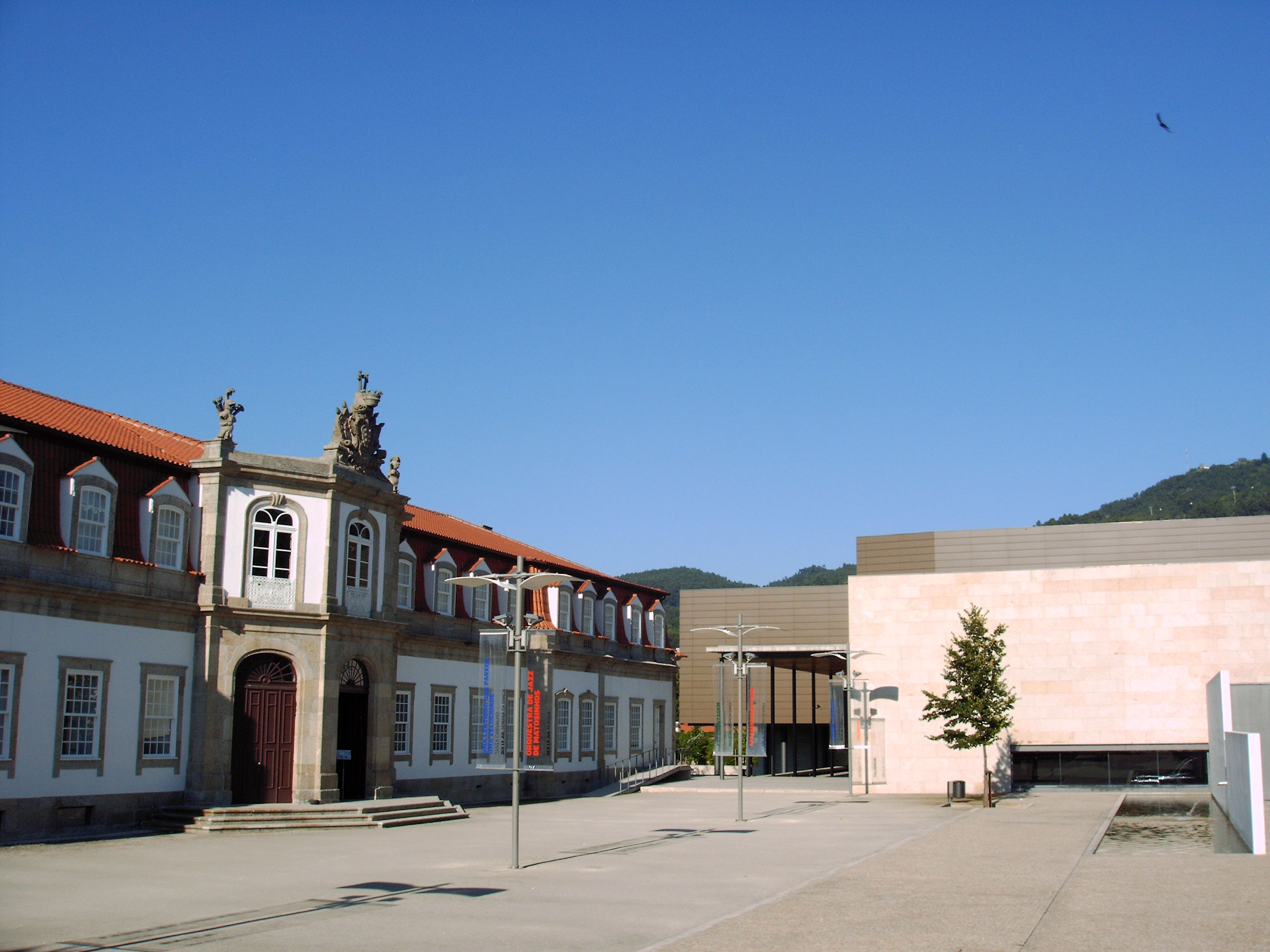
The Vila Flor Palace and the Vila Flor Cultural Centre in 2007

The city of Guimarães has several cultural spaces of reference at a regional and national level. Among the several museums of the city, the Alberto Sampaio museum is the one that stands out. Founded in 1928, it opened its doors to the public in 1931; it is located in the old site of the Canon the Collegiate of Our Lady of Oliveira (Cabido da Colegiada de Nossa Senhora da Oliveira in Portuguese). It contains a rich collection of pieces from the 14th, 15th and 16th century, including one rare vest that was used by the king John I.

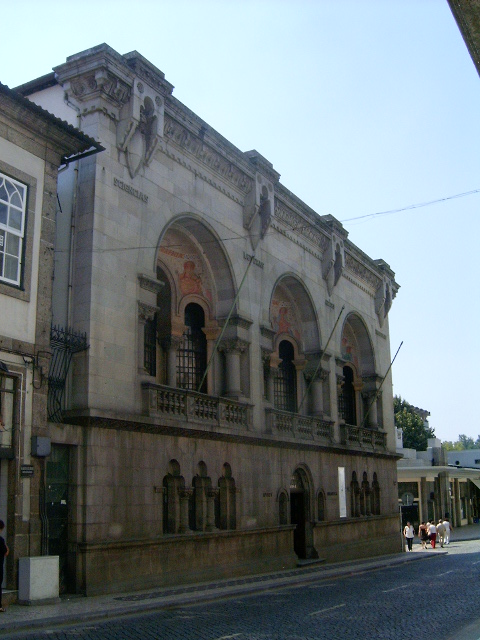
Headquarters of the Martins Sarmento Society

The Martins Sarmento Society (Sociedade Martins Sarmento in Portuguese) is one of the country oldest institutions dedicated to the study and preservation of archaeological artifacts. The society owns two museums: the Archaeological Museum of the Martins Sarmento Society, which is known by its prehistory and protohistory collections and also its numismatics and epigraphy collections; and the Castro Culture Museum which is dedicated to the Castro culture.

There is also: the Primitive Modern Arts Museum, located in the Domus Municipalis (the old city hall), which contains a collection of naïve art; the Museum of the Village of São Torcato, which is dedicated to the region and its relationship with the monastery and Saint Torcato (São Torcato in Portuguese); the Agriculture Museum of Fermentões, which exhibits collections of the traditional agricultural practices of the region; and the Museum of São Sebastião, inaugurated on 24 March 1984, which contains mainly sacred art.

Other cultural venues include:

- Vila Flor Cultural Center (Centro Cultural Vila Flor in Portuguese) is the main cultural venue in Guimarães. It was built in 2005, besides the restored Vila Flor Palace and its surrounding area. It has two auditoriums, a concert-cafe and an exhibition gallery. The surrounding gardens of the old palace were also redone and in 2006, received an honorable mention in the Public Exterior Spaces category in the National Landscape Architecture Award.
- São Mamede – Guimarães Arts and Shows Center
- Raul Brandão Municipal Library has its headquarters in the city and also has branches in Pevidém, Caldas das Taipas and Ronfe. It offers its mobile library services to 42 parishes and services the city schools and prison.
- The Art Laboratory (Laboratorio das Artes in Portuguese) was founded in 2004 by ESAP students. It is a cultural space for exhibitions, performances, music and art workshops.
- Alfredo Pimenta National Archive, founded in 1931, contains the archives for municipality of Guimarães and also the Braga district.

=== Sports ===
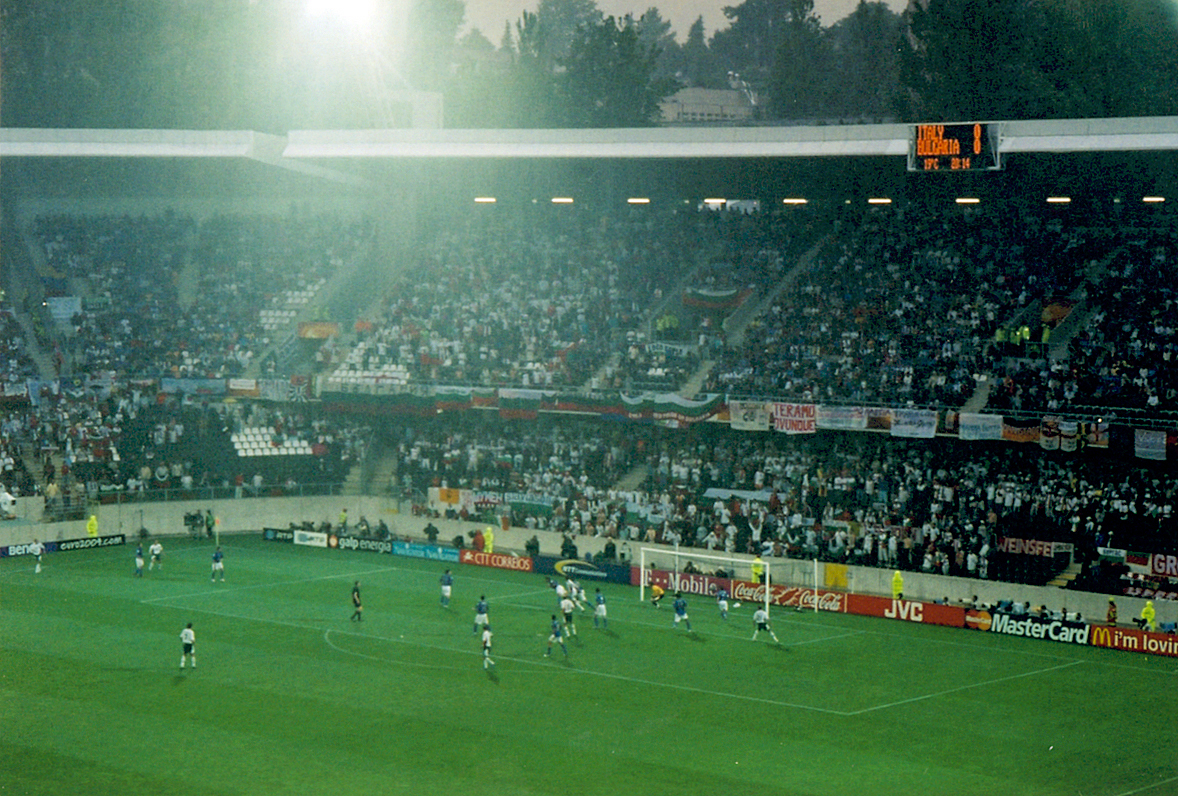
Estádio D. Afonso Henriques

Guimarães has two major sports club, Vitória Sport Clube, whose football (soccer) team has been the city's representative in the Primeira Liga every year, having already conquered a Portuguese Cup in 2012/13 and a Portuguese Supercup in 1988, and Moreirense Futebol Clube, whose football (soccer) team is also in Primeira Liga for some years and already won the Portuguese Second Division in 2013/14 and the Portuguese League Cup in 2016/17. During Vitória SC European campaigns, the Portuguese team played against teams like Arsenal FC, Atletico Madrid, Real Sociedad, Eintracht Frankfurt, Parma FC and Borussia Monchengladbach.

Vitória SC also has handball, basketball, volleyball and water polo squads competing in the top divisions of their sports.

== Society ==
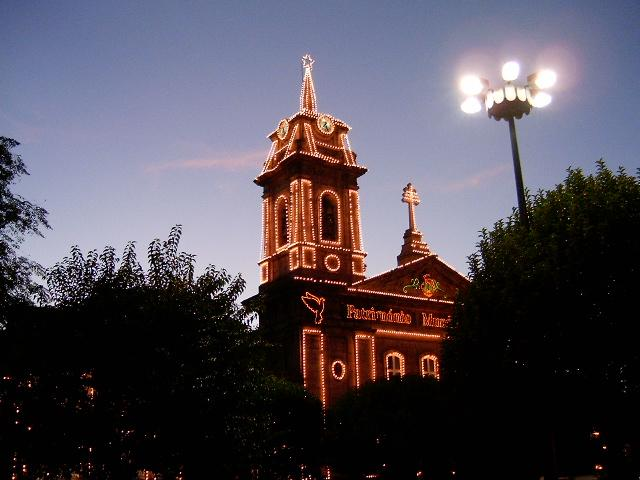
The St. Peter's Basilica in the Toural Square, lit to celebrate UNESCO heritage status

In 2008, the city ranked second in the index of most livable city in Portugal. It is also the 10th least polluted city in the country according to IQAir.

In 2004, 89% of the population had running water; it was forecast that the number would raise to 95% by 2006. In 2001, 63.5% of the population had basic sanitation; it was forecast that the number would raise to 80% by 2008. In 2001, 100% of the population had access to waste management services.

However, several people complain that the city, together with other cities of the Braga district has had an unaesthetic and unorganized growth.

=== Newspapers ===
Guimarães ranks fourth in the country for available newspapers. The oldest was the "Azemel Vimaranense", founded in 1822; it possibly had its publication halted by the Vilafrancada incidents. From 1856, other newspapers start to appear, amongst them "A Tesoura de Guimarães". Actually the city's newspapers are:

- O Comércio de Guimarães
- O Cónego
- O Conquistador
- Desportivo de Guimarães
- Entrevillas
- O Expresso do Ave
- Jornal do Adepto
- Lordelo Jornal
- Notícias de Guimarães
- O Pilar
- O Povo de Guimarães
- Reflexo – O Espelho das Taipas
- Sport Jornal dos Desportos

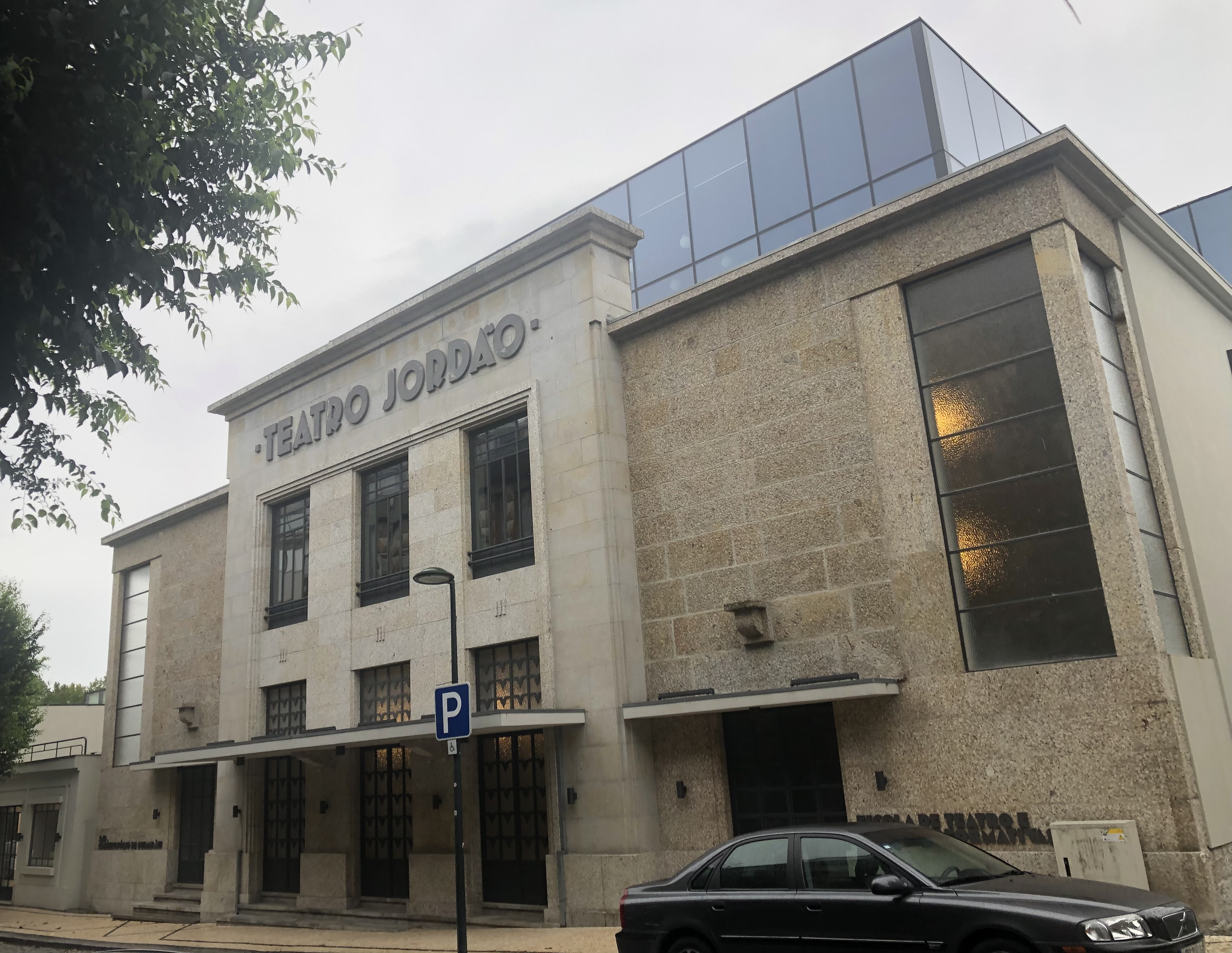
The Jordão Theatre located in Urgezes is an important cultural center in Guimarães

=== Radio ===
There are two stations headquartered in the town: Radio Fundação (95.8 FM) and Radio Santiago (98.0 FM).

=== Television ===
The Guimarães TV transmission is made online since 24 July 2007; it is the result of a collaboration between the city's assembly and the Guimarães Cybercenter. Its contents are feature in the Região Norte TV channel which is available through cable.

The "canalguimarães" was another online channel that started operating in March 2010. It is the fruit of the effort put in by an arts association, the "Associação de Socorros Mútuos Artística Vimaranense", one of the oldest associations of the city.

== Economy ==
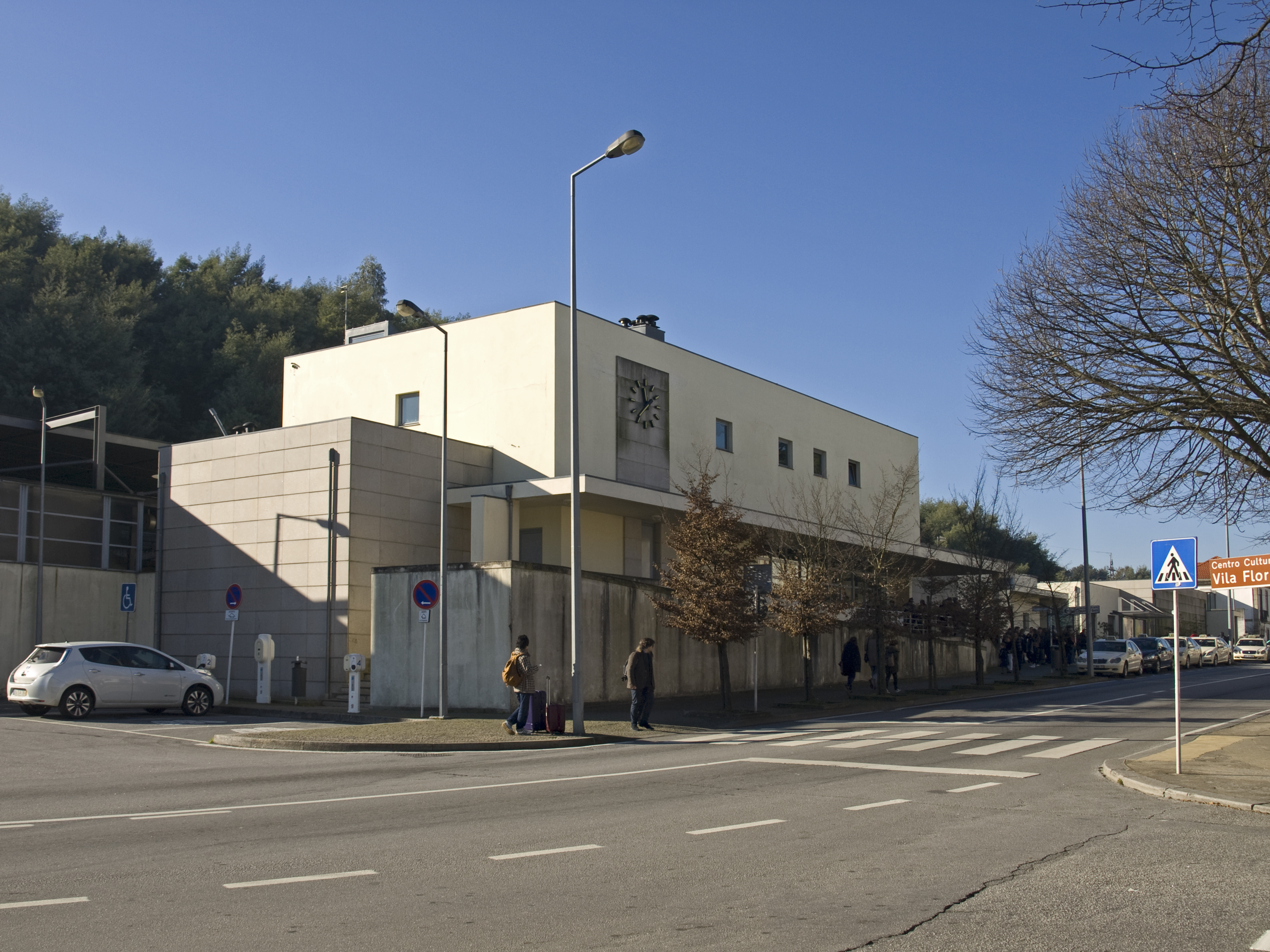
The new Guimarães train station, terminus of the Guimarães line

Guimarães is one of the most industrial municipalities in Portugal. Its primary industries are textiles, shoe industry and metalomechanics.

=== Transport ===
Guimarães is linked to Porto by the Guimarães line. This railway line was originally built with narrow gauge track, then modernised and rebuilt to the broad Iberian gauge in the first decade of the 21st century. The train service is operated by Comboios de Portugal (CP). Locally, Guimarães is served by TUG (Transportes Urbanos de Guimarães) which operates 21 bus routes serving the city.

The Guimarães Cable Car, a gondola lift, links the city centre with the top of Monte da Penha.

== Twin towns – sister cities ==
Guimarães is twinned with:

- Brive-la-Gaillarde, France
- Colonia del Sacramento, Uruguay
- Compiègne, France
- Dijon, France
- Igualada, Spain
- Kaiserslautern, Germany
- Londrina, Brazil
- Mé-Zóchi, São Tomé and Príncipe
- Montluçon, France
- Ribeira Grande de Santiago, Cape Verde
- Rio de Janeiro, Brazil
- Tacoronte, Spain

== Notable people ==
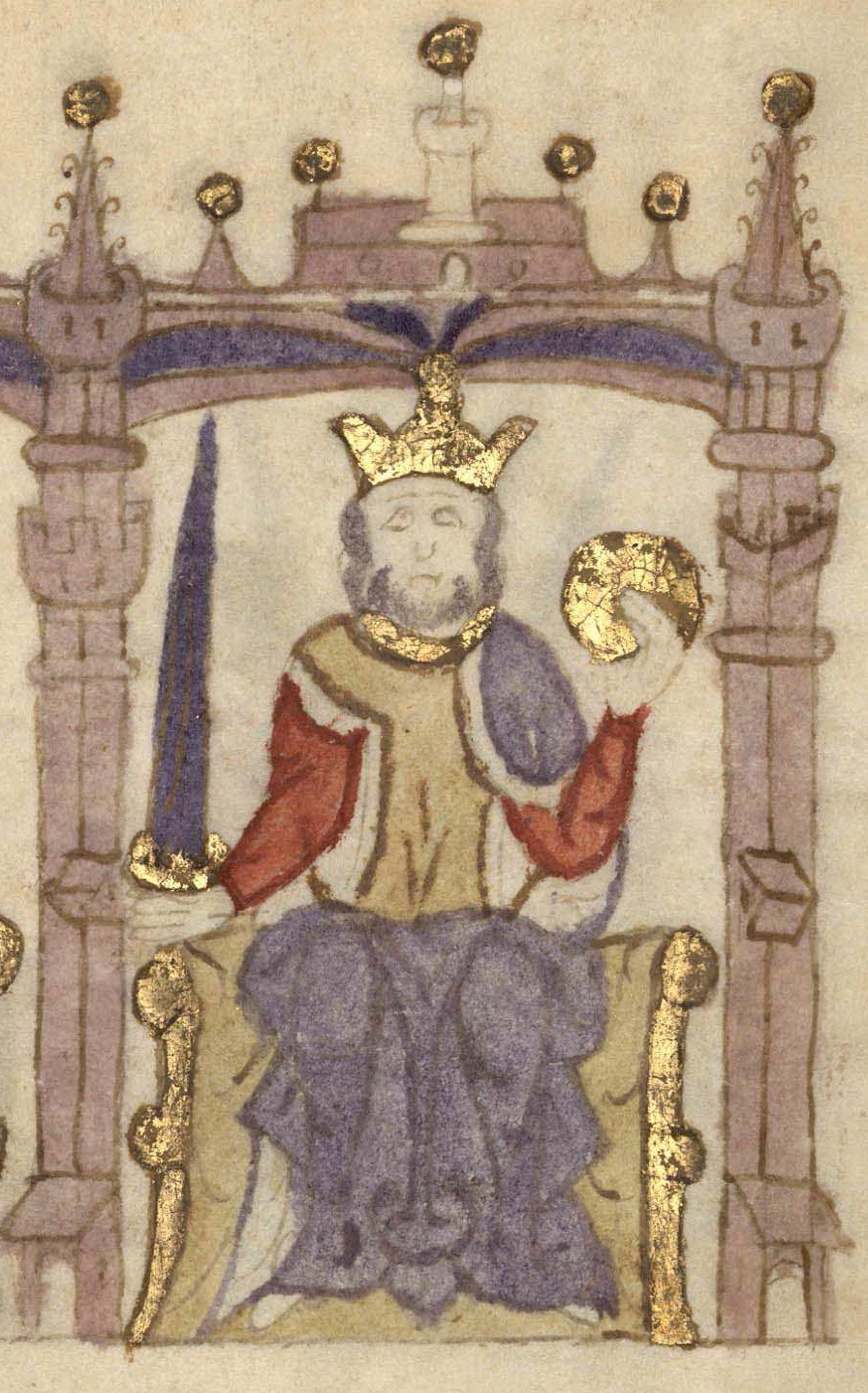
King Afonso I of Portugal

=== Medieval and Early Modern ===
- Urraca Henriques (c. 1095-1173) noble person and daughter of Teresa de Leão and sister of Afonso I
- Afonso I of Portugal (1111–1185) nicknamed "the Conqueror" by the Moors, whom he fought, was the first King of Portugal
- Paio Galvão (c. 1165–1230) a Leonese Cardinal, canon lawyer, a papal legate and leader of the Fifth Crusade
- Blanche of Portugal (1259–1321) an infanta, the firstborn child of King Afonso III of Portugal
- Gil Vicente (c. 1465–ca.1536) a playwright and poet, acted and directed his own plays
- Agostinho Barbosa (1589–1649) a writer on canon law, consecrated Bishop of Ugento in Italy
- Catarina de Lencastre, Viscountess of Balsemão (1749—1824) a noblewoman, poet and playwright.

=== Late Modern ===
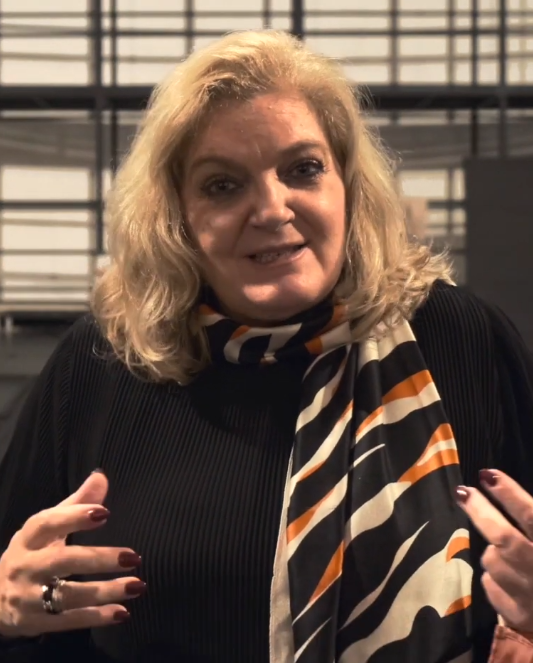
Elisabete Matos, 2021

- António Augusto da Silva Cardoso (1831-1893) a Portuguese painter
- Alberto Sampaio (1841-1908) a historian, writer, archaeologist and teacher
- Vicente Pinheiro Lobo Machado de Melo e Almada (1852-1922) a politician, diplomat, congressperson and colonial administrator
- João Gomes de Oliveira Guimarães (1853-1912) a politician, historian and catholic priest
- Abel Cardoso (1877-1964) a painter, and son of António Augusto da Silva Cardoso
- João de Meira (1881-1913) a writer, poet, historian and doctor.
- Alfredo Pimenta (1882–1950) a historian, poet and writer about the Middle Ages
- Abel Salazar (1889–1946) a physician, lecturer, researcher, writer and painter
- Emídio Guerreiro (1899-2005) a teacher, politician and opponent of the Estado Novo
- Arnaldo Sampaio (1908-1984) a doctor, receiver of the Grã-Cruz da Ordem do Mérito medal
- Duarte Freitas do Amaral (1909–1979) a Portuguese politician, was a deputy to the National Assembly of Portugal
- Mário António Caldas de Melo Saraiva (1910-1998) historian, doctor, politician and writer
- Alberto Martins (born 1945) a lawyer, politician and congressperson
- Luís Marques Mendes (born 1957) a Portuguese lawyer and politician
- Elisabete Matos (born 1964) a Portuguese soprano.
- Zé Amaro (born 1973) singer known as the "Portuguese Cowboy".
- Guilherme Peixoto (born 1974) Catholic priest and DJ 'Padre Guilherme'.
- Pedro Chagas Freitas (born 1979) writer, journalist and public speaker on leadership issues
- Marisa Ferreira (born 1983) an artist whose work includes public art and geometric art
- Sofia Escobar (born 1984) a soprano singer and actress in London's West End musicals.
- Renato Freitas (born 1991) stage name Lizzy's Husband an electronic music artist especially industrial electronica

=== Sports ===
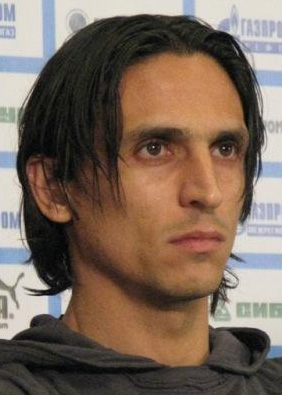
Fernando Meira, 2009

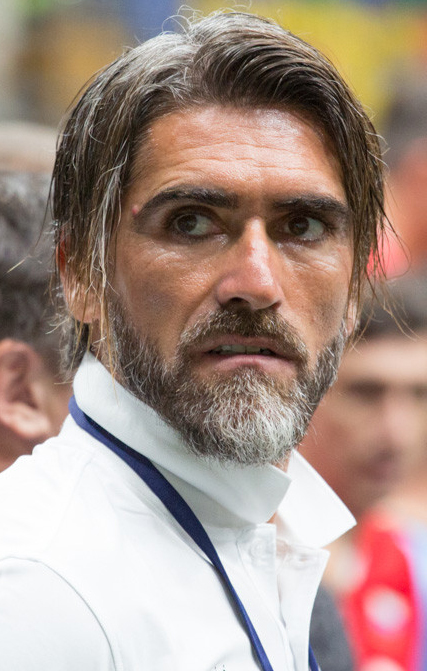
Pedro Mendes, 2018

- Francisco "Xico" Ferreira (1919–1986) a footballer with 178 club caps and 25 with Portugal
- Aurora Cunha (born 1959) a former athlete
- Horácio Gonçalves (born 1962) a retired footballer with 284 club caps and currently a manager.
- Domingos Castro (born 1963) a former long-distance runner, competed in the 1988, 1992, 1996 and 2000 Summer Olympics
- Dionísio Castro (born 1963) a former long-distance runner, he competed at the 1988 and 1992 Summer Olympics
- Miguel Marques (born 1963) a retired footballer with 545 club caps
- Quim Berto (born 1971) a former professional footballer with 451 club caps
- Fernando Meira (born 1978) a footballer with 534 club caps and 54 with Portugal
- Pedro Mendes (born 1979) a footballer with 298 club caps and 11 with Portugal
- Domingos Alexandre Martins Costa (born 1979) known as Alex, is a former footballer with 295 club caps
- Rui Faria (born 1980) known as Faria, is a football goalkeeper with 270 club caps
- Ricardo (born 1980) a Cape Verdean footballer with 469 club caps and 16 with Cape Verde
- Vítor Lima (born 1981) a retired footballer with 479 club caps
- Carlos Carneiro (born 1982) a former Portuguese handballer.
- Ana Dulce Félix (born 1982) a long-distance runner, competed in the 2012 and 2016 Summer Olympics
- Custódio Castro (born 1983) known as Custódio, a retired footballer with 342 club caps and 10 with Portugal
- Vieirinha (born 1986) a footballer with over 400 club caps and 25 with Portugal
- Márcio Sousa (born 1986) a professional footballer with over 350 club caps
- João Sousa (born 1989) Portugal's greatest tennis player, ranked 36th by the ATP
- Rui Bragança (born 1991) a Portuguese taekwondo practitioner

== See also ==
- List of buildings and structures in Guimarães
- Timeline of Guimarães
- History of Portugal
