= Rui Faria (footballer, born 1980) =

Portuguese footballer

Personal information
- Full name: Rui Jorge Faria Azevedo
- Date of birth: 9 December 1980 (age 45)
- Place of birth: Guimarães, Portugal
- Height: 1.79 m (5 ft 10 1/2 in)
- Position: Goalkeeper

Youth career
- 1992–1995: Vitória Guimarães
- 1995–1996: Ribeira de Pena
- 1996: Pevidém
- 1997–1999: Aves

Senior career*
Years	Team	Apps	(Gls)
1999–2015	Aves	197	(0)
2000–2001	→ Serzedelo (loan)	24	(0)
2015–2016	Tirsense	25	(0)
2016–2017	Oliveirense	19	(0)
2017–2018	Fafe	5	(0)
Total		270	(0)
- * Club domestic league appearances and goals

Rui Jorge Faria Azevedo (born 9 December 1980), known as Faria, is a Portuguese former footballer who played as a goalkeeper.

He spent most of his professional career with Aves.

== Club career ==
Born in Guimarães, Faria joined C.D. Aves' youth system in 1997. He made his senior debut with amateurs G.D. Serzedelo in his native region, returning after one season on loan in the fourth division.

Faria became the undisputed starter in 2004, helping to promotion to the Primeira Liga two years later after an absence of more than two decades. He made his debut in the competition on 26 August 2006 in a 2–2 away draw against S.C. Beira-Mar, and kept his starting place until the following January transfer window, when he lost it to veteran Nuno Espírito Santo.

Faria suffered a season-ending injury in April 2007, as Aves were finally relegated as last. He appeared in a further 84 Segunda Liga matches until his departure from the club in June 2015.
