= Lizzy's Husband =

Portuguese electronic music artist

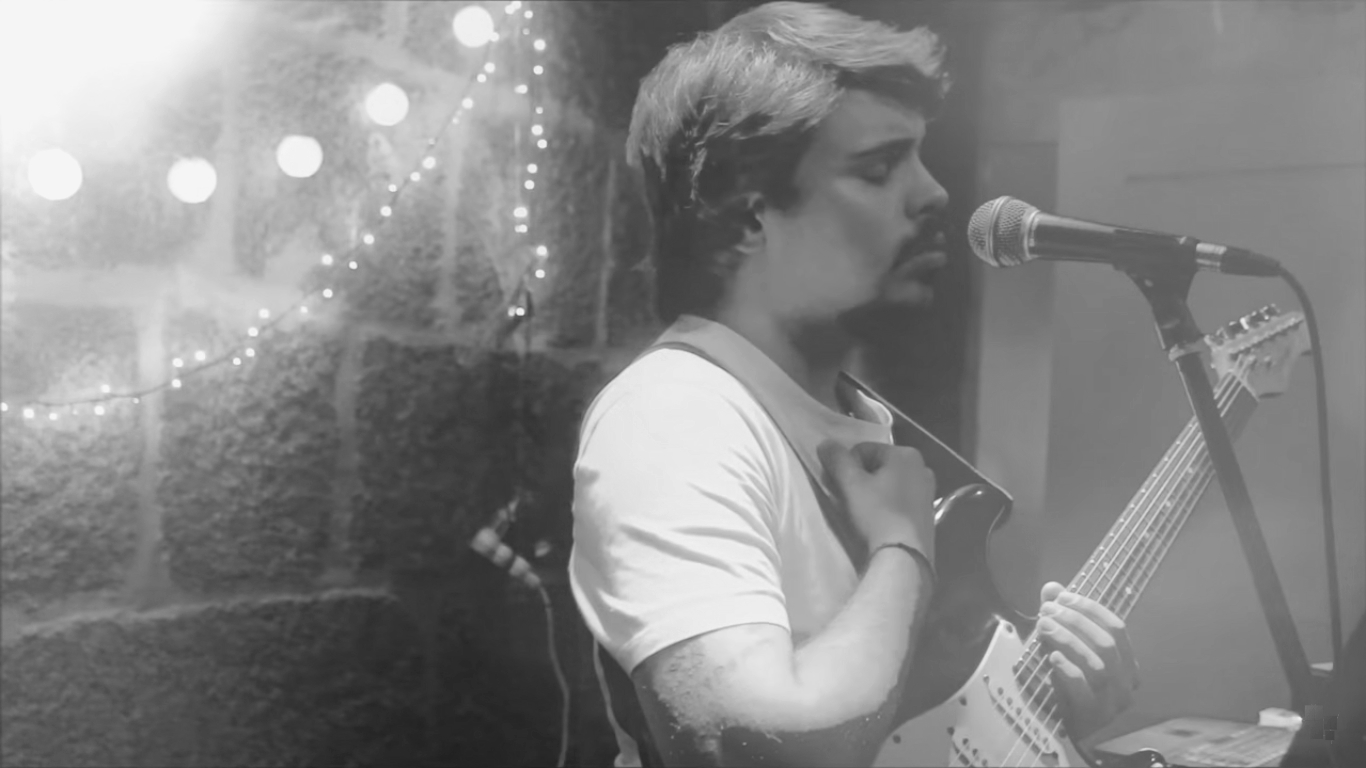
- Lizzy's Husband performing during the "5YEARS Sessions", 2016

Background information
- Born: Renato Freitas; 22 March 1991 (age 35); Guimarães, Portugal
- Genres: Pop, rock, dance, electro, alternative, industrial
- Occupations: Singer-songwriter, music producer, video producer
- Instruments: Vocals, guitar, keyboard, bass
- Years active: 2011–2017 2026-present
- Label: Mimi Records (2012–15)
- Website: lizzyshusband.bandcamp.com

Renato Freitas (born 22 March 1991), stage name Lizzy's Husband, is a Portuguese electronic music artist who combines various genres of electronica, especially industrial electronica and dance pop music.

Being an autodidact, Renato makes use of sound elements and several instruments in his production. He is keen on the guitar, the keyboard, bass guitar and recording and production tasks.

As of 2017, he has released four studio albums, one compilation album and several singles and music videos. In December 2015, Bandcom created an online poll, "Best Portuguese Album of The Year", in which his debut studio album was included and nominated for. He is currently working on new music, which has been referred as a departure from his electronic-industrial roots, exploring new and different music genres and styles.

== Life and career ==
=== 2011–2014: Career beginnings and Mimi Records ===
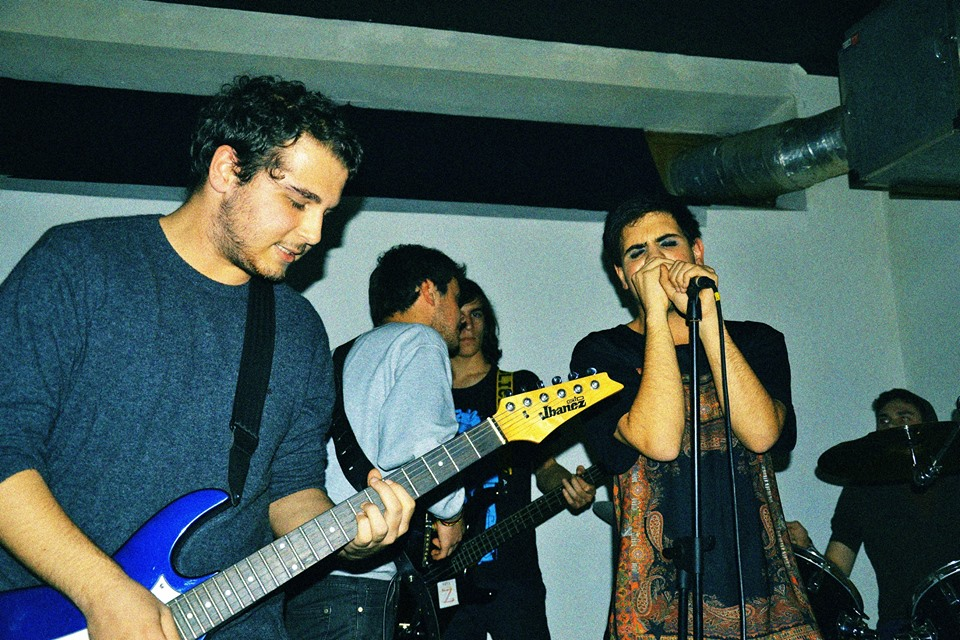
Renato performing live with his former band in 2014

Renato was born in Guimarães, Portugal, in 1991. He attended Soares dos Reis Arts School, where he got his diploma for his studies in video and communication courses. Before beginning his solo career, he served as the lead singer for Portuguese band Finished With My Ex, with whom he worked until its disbandment in 2014. The band released two singles, "Politics Suicide Lovers" and "Boys Boys Boys", with the first receiving moderate radio airplay in radio stations, such as Antena 3.

He was then discovered by Mimi Records, a Portuguese music label, in 2012, with whom he released his first two studio albums, A Loud Silence (2013) and Violent Stomach (2015). A Loud Silence was released digitally under a Creative Commons license. In December 2015, Bandcom created an online poll, "Best Portuguese Album of The Year", in which the album was included and nominated for. Lizzy's Husband debut single, "Petrichor", was first released in the summer of 2013, with its music video premiering on national TV channel RTP, featured on the music show Poplusa.

A Loud Silence is primarily an electronic oriented album, with industrial, ambient and dance elements in some songs. Lyrically, the album leads with themes such as anxiety, death, self-destruction, low self esteem and anger management issues, with Freitas saying that the lyrics were written when he "moved from Guimarães to Porto and it was socially hard to adapt to it. I guess that's why the album has such a dark mood in it". Musicians such as Trent Reznor, from Nine Inch Nails, and Björk have been cited as major influences on the album's production and musical direction. The album was entirely recorded in Renato's house, using a laptop and a microphone, thus the sound presents a very "lo-fi" characteristic. In a 2017 interview with esQrever, Freitas said that music was the key factor that helped him through life, citing "A Place for the Ghosts" and "The Weight of the World" as songs that reflect his struggles with gender identity, describing the first as an "inner battle between genders".

His second studio album, Violent Stomach was released through Mimi Records in January 2015. Renato defines the album as "Very electronic, very rock, very eclectic, with different moods and vibes along the album that will provoke different sensations to different people." In a 2017 interview with esQrever, Renato jokingly recalled the album as his "Glamour & Lifestyle" album, comparing it to a tabloid magazine, where he explored his sexuality, his experiences with substances, different cultures he got in touch with and people he met at the time who introduced him to the wonders of theater production.

=== 2015–2016: Independent releases ===
After three years working with Mimi Records, the two went separate ways for the release of Kinoteatr, Renato's fourth studio album (third at the time), by the end of 2015. The album was postponed for a 2016 release, but only came out in April 2017, when was released independently through the project's Bandcamp page.

In 2016, struggling to find a label who could release his music, Renato released Blooms Every May, the project's third studio album, made available for free download through Bandcamp. Renato sarcastically refers to the album as his "heartbreak record", explaining he "had never written in such an honest and profound way. Love has always been something I talked negatively up to that point. I'm happy I was able to see it in a different way, from different angles". The album was met with favorable reviews, with Hugo Geada, from Threshold Magazine citing "It's the perfect music to listen to after a long day, when the only thing that comes to you is lying in your bed with your headphones, in the relaxing darkness of your bedroom".

By the end of 2016, 5YEARS: The Best Of Lizzy's Husband, a compilation featuring the project's best songs, singles, reworked versions and exclusive new tracks, was made available for free download. The compilation was presented by the single "5YEARS", which served as the lead single, celebrating the five years of the project.

=== 2017-2026: Unreleased fifth studio album and hiatus ===
After a demo leaked online in the summer of 2016, Renato announced via social media that he was working on a new album. On 2 June 2017 the lead single for the album, "For Ellya", was featured in an EP and made available for digital purchase. The EP also features an acoustic version of the song, the original leaked demo and the instrumental version. In a Facebook post, he referred to the track as "one of my best songs, inspired by someone special with whom I spent my whole summer". In an interview with esQrever in June 2017, Renato revealed the name of the new album, which is titled Peanut Butter Sandwich Makers, confirming a 2018 release. He described the album as a departure from his electronic dark roots, pursuing a more pop-acoustic folk oriented genre, mentioning it as his "best, most solid and consistent work to date".

No updates on the album being released have been given.

=== 2026-present: Upcoming studio album ===
After many years on hiatus, in march 2026 Lizzy's Husband revealed their comeback through a social media post, announcing a new album titled "mar.IA", set to be released on 31 December 2026, with its lead single "SiCK SiNK DRiNK" being released on Halloween. This marks the artist's first body of work since the release of experimental-electronic driven "Kinoteatr" in 2017.

== Discography ==
=== Studio albums ===
- 2013: A Loud Silence (Mimi Records)
- 2015: Violent Stomach (Mimi Records)
- 2016: Blooms Every May (independent release)
- 2017: kinoteatr (independent release)
- 2026: mar.IA (TBA)

=== Compilations ===
- 2016: 5YEARS: The Best Of Lizzy's Husband
