= João de Meira =

Portuguese historian and writer (1881–1913)

- João Monteiro de Meira
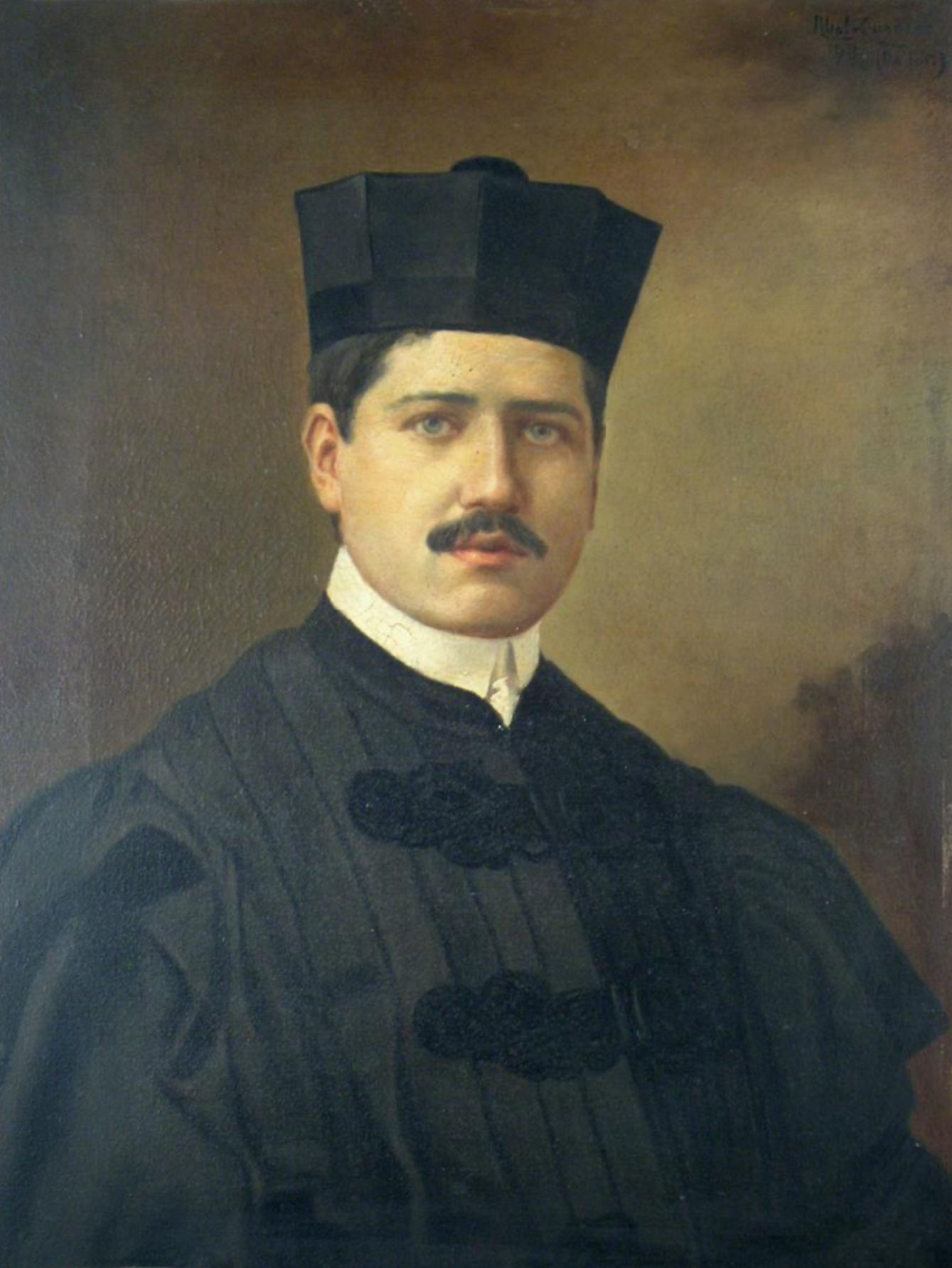
- Oil painting of João de Meira, 1919.
- Born: 31 July 1881; São Paio, Guimarães
- Died: 25 September 1919 (aged 38); Gominhães, Guimarães
- Occupations: Writer, historian, doctor
- Spouse: Madalena Baptista Sampaio
- Children: 2
- Writing career
- Language: Portuguese

João Monteiro de Meira (Guimarães, 31 July 1881 – Guimarães, 25 September 1913) was a Portuguese writer, historian and doctor.

== Biography ==
=== Early life ===
As the first-born son of Dr. Joaquim José de Meira and Adelaide Sofia da Silva Monteiro, João de Meira was born on 31 July 1881 at the D. João I Street, in São Paio, central Guimarães. In that city he studied primary and high school at the Colégio de S. Dâmaso (1891-1896), before leaving for Porto to attend the preparatory course for the surgical-medical course at the Academia Politécnica do Porto (1896-1899) and the Escola Politécnica de Lisboa (1899-1900), after which he entered the Escola Médico-Cirúrgica do Porto (1900-1906).

=== Work ===
At this institution he obtained his degree with a mark of 16, after defending his inaugural dissertation O concelho de Guimarães (1907) with a maximum mark of 20. A year later, he began his academic career there as a substitute lecturer for the surgical section (1908), later becoming a substitute lecturer for the chair of Forensic Medicine and director of the Porto Morgue (1909), and when the University of Porto was elevated, he was appointed ordinary professor of Pharmacology and Natural Sciences (1911), although he maintained his previous teaching duties. João de Meira also popularized the name Nicolinas in the early 20th century for the festivities of the city of Guimarães, previously known simply as St Nicholas' Festivities. He also wrote the Pregão of these festivities in 1903, 1904 and 1905.

In the meantime, between finishing his degree and starting to teach at university, he returned to Guimarães where he worked for about a year as a private doctor, journalist, clinician at the S. Domingos Hospital and teacher at the Martins Sarmento High School. Two children were born of his marriage to Madalena Baptista Sampaio, with only daughter Virgínia Adelaide surviving childhood. From an early age he showed exceptional intelligence, memory and literary culture, almost always writing articles and sonnets under pseudonyms in periodicals such as O Comércio de Guimarães, O Independente, A Alvorada, O Comércio do Porto, among others, and founded his own art and criticism newspaper A Parvónia.

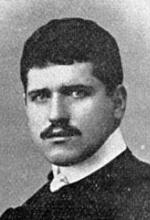
Photograph of João de Meira.

Towards the end of his life, he became known as a historian and writer. In the first, more oriented towards the History of Medicine, he signed a new series “Arquivos da História da Medicina Portuguesa” with Maximiano Lemos, re-examined historiographical myths of Guimarães in the Revista de Guimarães and the Gazeta dos Hospitais do Porto, and was even invited to succeed João Gomes de Oliveira Guimarães in the continuation of the 1908 book Vimaranis Monumenta Historica by the Martins Sarmento Society. As a literary writer under other names, he published original compositions imitating the literary style of ancient and modern authors in original compositions such as Fernão Lopes, Camões, Bocage, Antero de Quental, Camilo Castelo Branco, Gil Vicente, António Nobre or Arthur Conan Doyle in a heterogeneous.

His literary ability and creativity ended up mythologizing him as a medium capable of reincarnating the spirits of these authors, as Colonel José Augusto Feure da Rosa fancifully claimed, easily contested by the testimonies of his fellow countrymen. As well as João de Meira's own refined and sarcastic sense of humor, who sent such unpublished works to the periodicals with plausible explanations, but which did not fail to indicate their real authorship by the elements provided. His most famous pastiche, which lasted several decades and was wrongly attributed to him, was the poem A Loira by Cesário Verde, which was almost always included in the anthologies compiled by the poet, until it was analyzed and identified as apocryphal in 1958 by Joel Serrão.

=== Death ===
João de Meira died on 25 September 1913 in Gominhães, at the age of 32, and is buried in a shallow tomb in the churchyard of the Chapel of Nossa Senhora do Bom Despacho. His work was the subject of posthumous publications by the Martins Sarmento Society and his name is remembered in a street and school group in Guimarães and in the Maximiano Lemos Museum of the History of Medicine at the University of Porto.

== Main works ==
- João Monteiro de Meyra, O Concelho de Guimarães: estudo dedemographia e nosografia (Porto: Typ. Guedes, 1907).
- João Monteiro de Meyra, O Parto Cesareo: sua historia, sua technica, seus accidentes ecomplicações, suas indicações e prognostico (Porto: Typ. Ind. Portuguesa, 1908).
- João Monteiro de Meyra, Reincidencia (Porto: Typ. da Enciclopédia Portuguesa, 1911).
- João de Meira, Eusébio Macário em Guimarães (Braga: Irmandade de Nossa Senhora do Bom Despacho, 1981).
- Seara Alheia (João de Meira), Gil Vicente: Jubileu de Amores – 1550 (Guimarães: Martins Sarmento Society, 2002).
- Donan Coyle (João de Meira), Sherlock Holmes no Porto (Guimarães: Martins Sarmento Society, 2009)

== Bibliography ==
- MONTEIRO, Hernâni, “Prof. João de Meira” in História do ensino médico no Porto:suplemento (Porto: Typ. Enciclopédia Portuguesa, 1925).
- VASCONCELOS, Manuela, Alguns vultos do Movimento Espírita Português.
- ARAÚJO, Francisco Miguel, “João de Meira” in Biografias Vimaranenses, (Guimarães: Fundação Cidade de Guimarães e A Oficina, 2013), 299-334.
